= Yingchunlu station =

Suzhou Metro station

Yingchunlu 迎春路
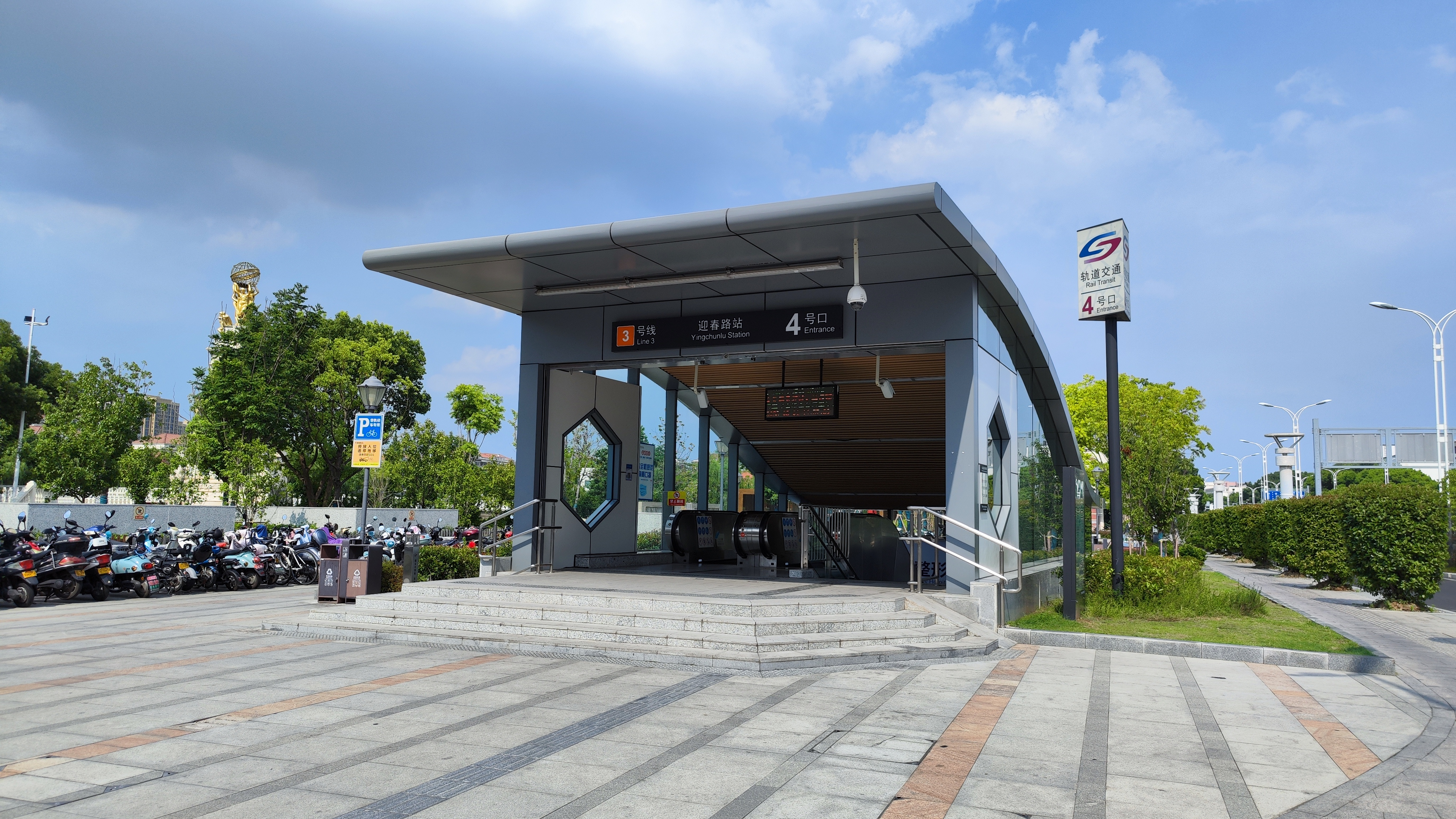

General information
- Location: Wuzhong District, Suzhou, Jiangsu; China
- Coordinates: 31.2699°N 120.6362°E
- Operated by: Suzhou Rail Transit Co., Ltd
- Line: Line 3
- Platforms: 2 (1 island platform)

Construction
- Structure type: Underground

History
- Opened: December 25, 2019

Services
Preceding station	Suzhou Metro	Following station
Baodailu towards Suzhou Xinqu Railway Station	Line 3	Beiganglu towards Weiting
Location

Yingchunlu Station (Chinese: 迎春路) is a station on Line 3 of the Suzhou Metro. The station is located in Wuzhong District, Suzhou. It has been in use since December 25, 2019, when Line 3 first opened to the public.
