= Yanyuqiao station =

Suzhou Metro station

Yanyuqiao 烟雨桥
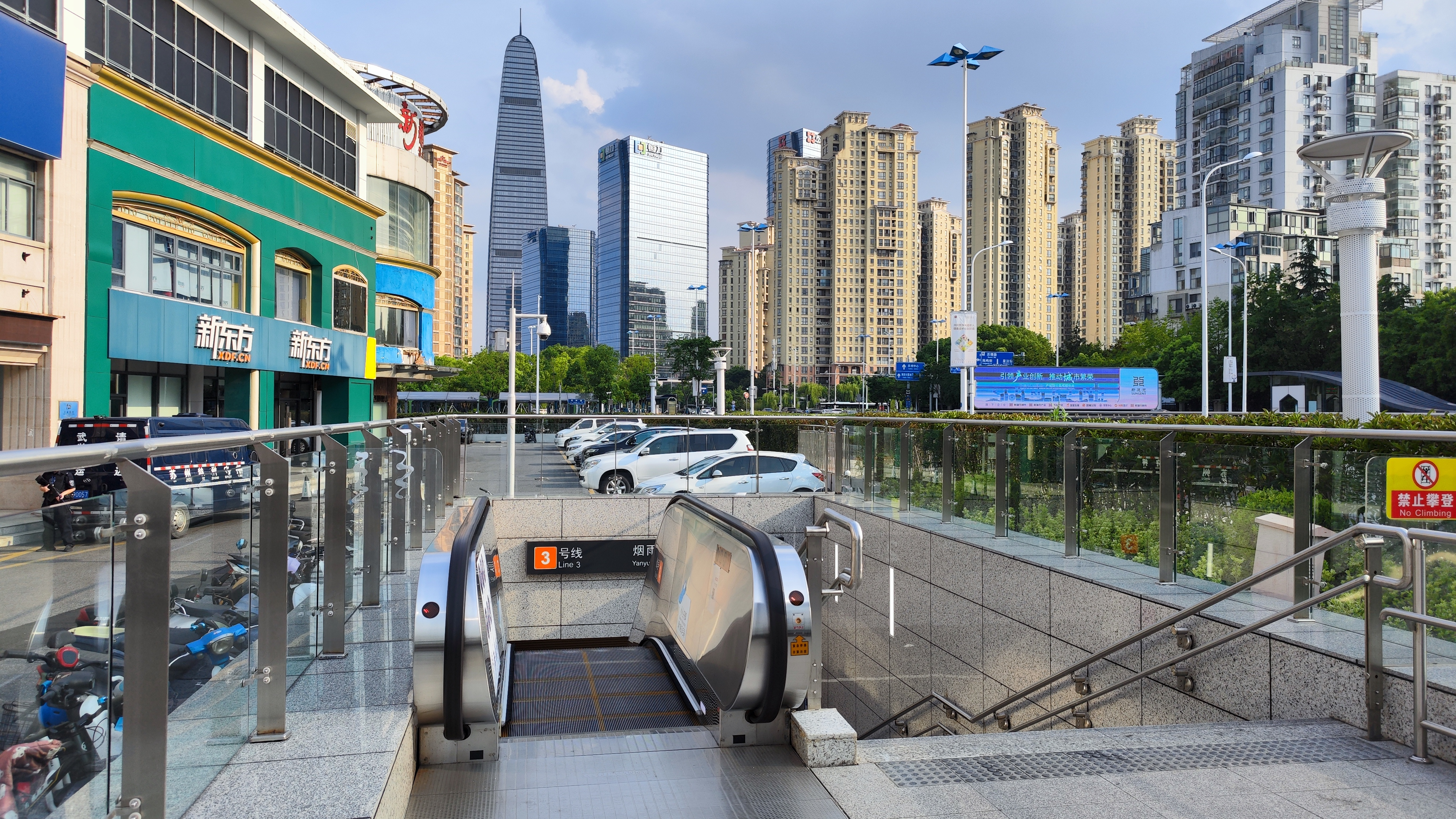
- Entrance 2

General information
- Location: Xinggang Street (星港街) × Xiandai Avenue (现代大道); Suzhou Industrial Park, Suzhou, Jiangsu; China
- Coordinates: 31°19′31″N 120°40′26″E
- Operated by: Suzhou Rail Transit Co., Ltd
- Line: Line 3
- Platforms: 2 (1 island platform)

Construction
- Structure type: Underground

History
- Opened: December 25, 2019

Services
Preceding station	Suzhou Metro	Following station
Dongfangzhimen towards Suzhou Xinqu Railway Station	Line 3	Nibang towards Weiting
Location

Yanyuqiao Station (simplified Chinese: 烟雨桥; traditional Chinese: 煙雨橋) is a station on Line 3 of the Suzhou Metro. The station is located in Suzhou Industrial Park, Jiangsu. It has been in use since December 25, 2019, when Line 3 first opened to the public.
