= Shizishan station (Suzhou Metro) =

Suzhou Metro station

Coordinates: 31°17′47″N 120°32′40″E

Shizishan 狮子山
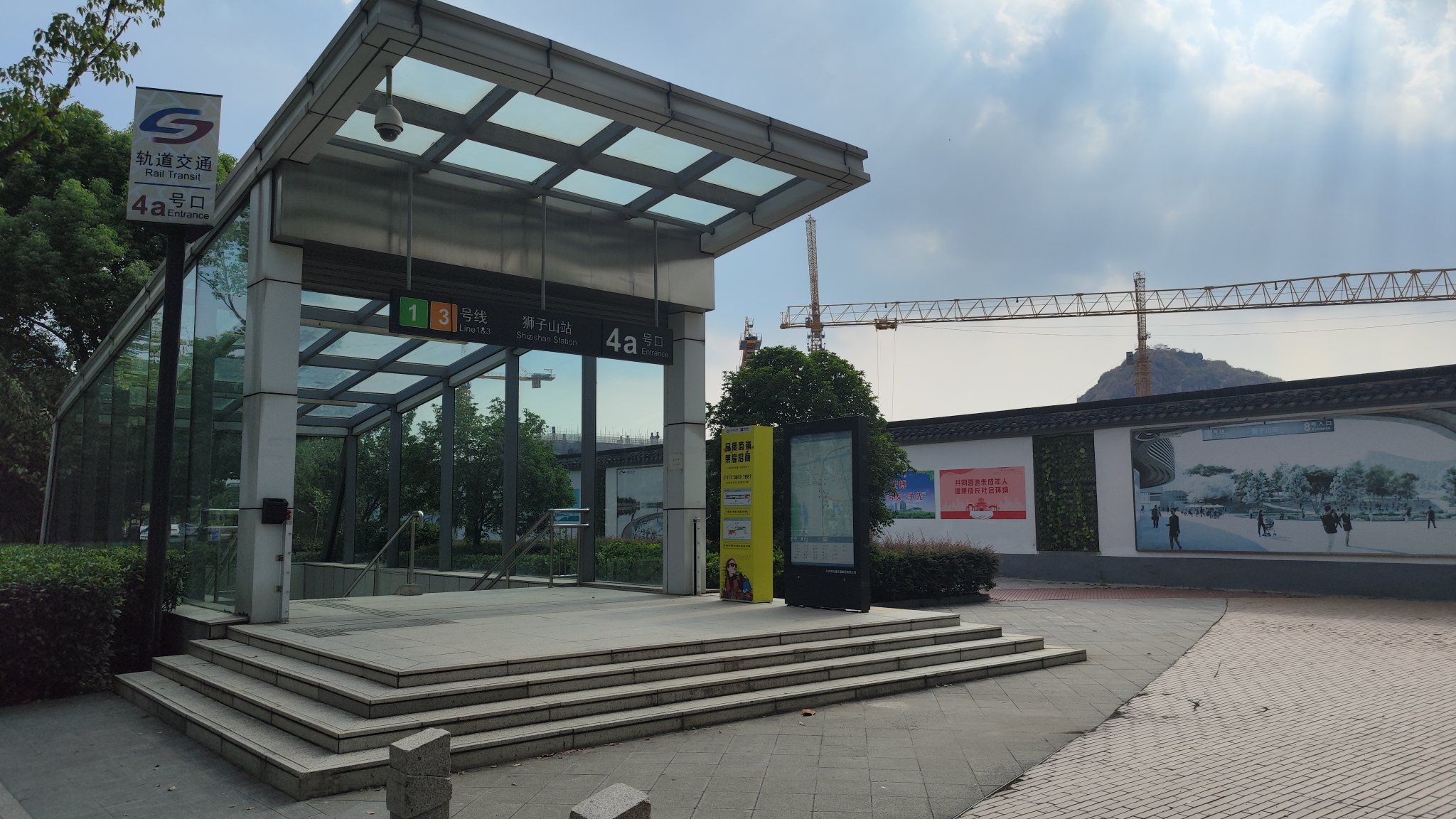

General information
- Location: Suzhou New District, Suzhou, Jiangsu; China
- Operated by: Suzhou Rail Transit Group Co., Ltd
- Lines: Line 1; Line 3; Tram line 1
- Platforms: 4 (2 island platforms)

Construction
- Structure type: Underground

History
- Opened: April 28, 2012

Services
Preceding station	Suzhou Metro	Following station
Yushan Lu towards Mudu	Line 1	Tayuan Lu towards Zhongnanjie
Heshan towards Suzhou Xinqu Railway Station	Line 3	Shishanlu towards Weiting
Location

Shizishan Station (Chinese: 狮子山站) is a station of Line 1 and Line 3 of the Suzhou Metro. The station is located in Suzhou New District of Suzhou. The station was formerly named Suzhou Amusement Land Station (Chinese: 苏州乐园站) but was renamed due to the closure of the amusement park. It has been in use since April 28, 2012, the same time of the operation of Line 1. The platforms for Line 3 were opened in December.

== Station ==
=== Accessible Information ===
- Shizishan station is a fully accessible station, this station equipped with wheelchair accessible elevators, blind paths with bumps, and wheelchair ramps. These facilities can help people with disabilities, seniors, youths, and pregnancies travel through Suzhou Metro system.

=== Station configurations ===
L1 (First Floor/Street Level): Entrances/Exits (stairs and escalators); and elevators with wheelchair accessible ramps.

B1 (Mezzanine/Station Hall Level): Station Control Room; Customer Service; Automatic Ticket Vending Machines; Automatic Fee Collection Systems with turnstiles; stairs and escalators; and elevators with wheelchair accessible ramps.

B2 (Platform Level): Line 1 platforms; toilet; stairs and escalators; elevators with wheelchair accessible ramps.

B3 (Platform Level): Line 3 platforms; toilet; stairs and escalators; elevators with wheelchair accessible ramps.

=== Station layout ===
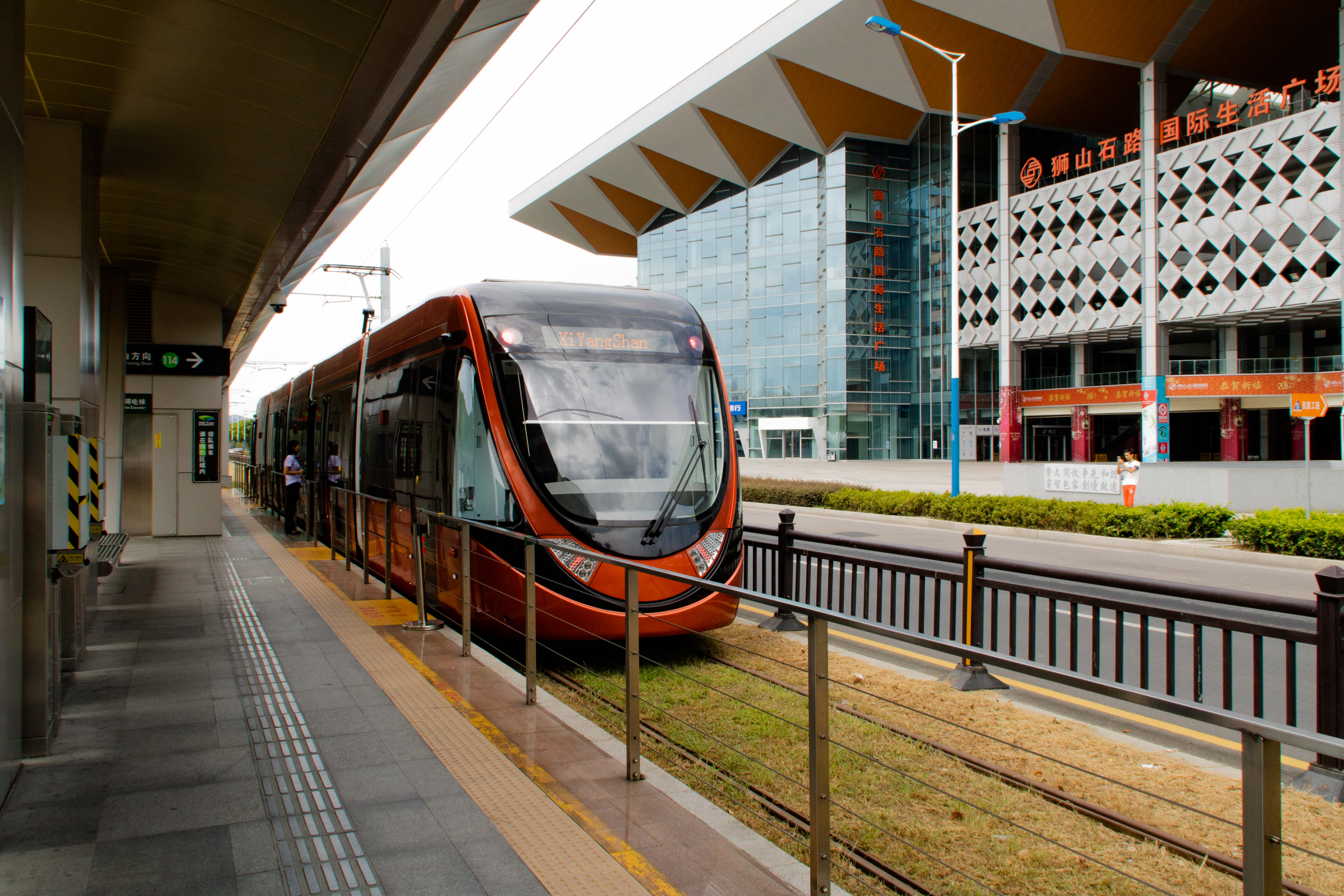
SND Tram at Shizishan Tram station

L1	Street Level	Entrances/Exits
B1	Mezzanine	Station Control, Customer Service, Fare-gates, Ticketing Machines
B2 Line 1 platforms	To Zhongnan Jie	← Line 1 towards Zhongnan Jie Next Station: Tayuan Lu
B2 Line 1 platforms	Island platform, doors will open on the left
B2 Line 1 platforms	To Mudu	→ Line 1 towards Mudu Next Station: Yushan Lu
B3 Line 3 platforms	To Weiting	← Line 3 towards Weiting Next Station: Shishan Lu
B3 Line 3 platforms	Island platform, doors will open on the left
B3 Line 3 platforms	To Suzhou Xinqu railway station	→ Line 3 towards Suzhou Xinqu railway station Next Station: Heshan

== Timetable ==
Directions	First train	Last train
Daily
Line 1
Towards Zhongnan Jie Station	06:18	22:08
Towards Mudu Station	06:48	23:13

== Station exit list ==
- Exit 1: West side of Changjiang Lu and Shishan Lu, inside of Suzhou Amusement Land
- Exit 2: Southwest side of Changjiang Lu and Shishan Lu
- Exit 3a: Southwest corner of Changjiang Lu and Shishan Lu, on the side of Changjiang Lu
- Exit 3b: Southeast corner of Changjiang Lu and Shishan Lu, inside of Suoshan Park
- Exit 4a: Northwest corner of Changjiang Lu and Shishan Lu, on the side of Changjiang Lu
- Exit 4b: Northeast corner of Changjiang Lu and Shishan Lu, on the side of Shishan Lu
- Exit 5: Southeast corner of Changjiang Lu and Jinshan Lu
- Exit 6: Northwest corner of Changjiang Lu and Jinshan Lu, on the side of Jinshan Lu
- Exit 7: Southwest corner of Changjiang Lu and Jinshan Lu, on the side of Jinshan Lu
- Exit 8: West side of Changjiang Lu

== Local places ==
- Shishan Plaza
- Lvbao Plaza
- Suzhou West Coach Bus Station
- Yuhuayuan
- Suoshan Park

== Transport connections ==
- Shizishan - Connection Bus Routes: Tour 3, 2, 33, 37, 38, 51, 89, 303, 304, 312, 333, BRT 11
- Keyun Xizhan (West Coach Station) - Connection Bus Routes: 42, 51, 67, 302, 303, 304, 322, 324, 327, 329, 333, 357, 816, 937, 3005, Peak 18
- Shizishan - route 1
