= Fenghelu station =

Suzhou Metro station

Coordinates: 31°21′20″N 120°44′06″E

Fenghelu 丰和路
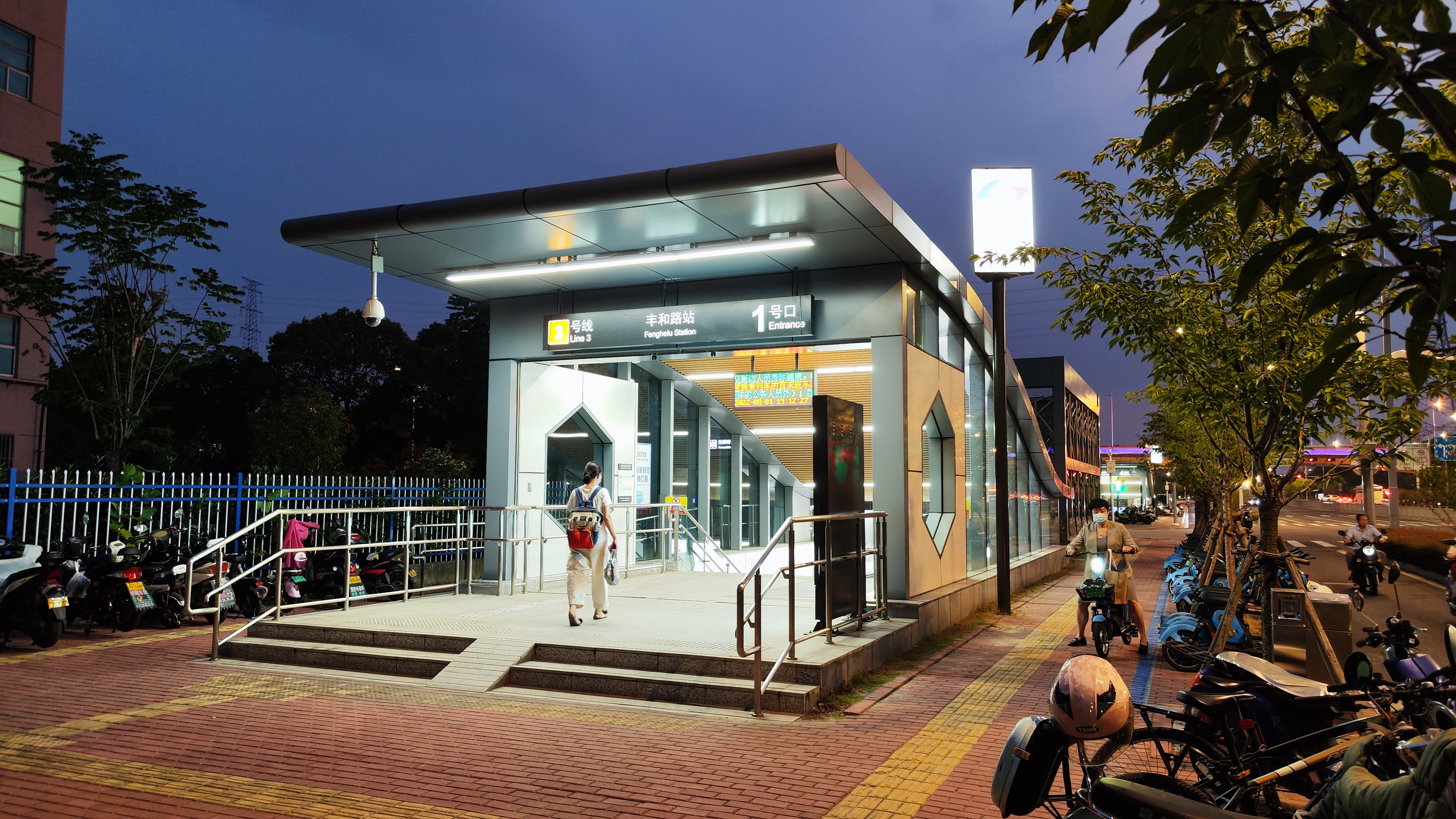

General information
- Location: Suzhou Industrial Park, Suzhou, Jiangsu; China
- Operated by: Suzhou Rail Transit Co., Ltd
- Line(s): Line 3
- Platforms: 2 (1 island platform)

Construction
- Structure type: Underground

History
- Opened: December 25, 2019

Services
Preceding station	Suzhou Metro	Following station
Fangwanjie towards Suzhou Xinqu Railway Station	Line 3	Shuangmajie towards Weiting

Fenghelu Station (Chinese: 丰和路) is a station on Line 3 of the Suzhou Metro. The station is located in Suzhou Industrial Park, Jiangsu. It has been in use since December 25, 2019, when Line 3 first opened to the public.
