= Mayunlu station =

Suzhou Metro station

Mayunlu 马运路
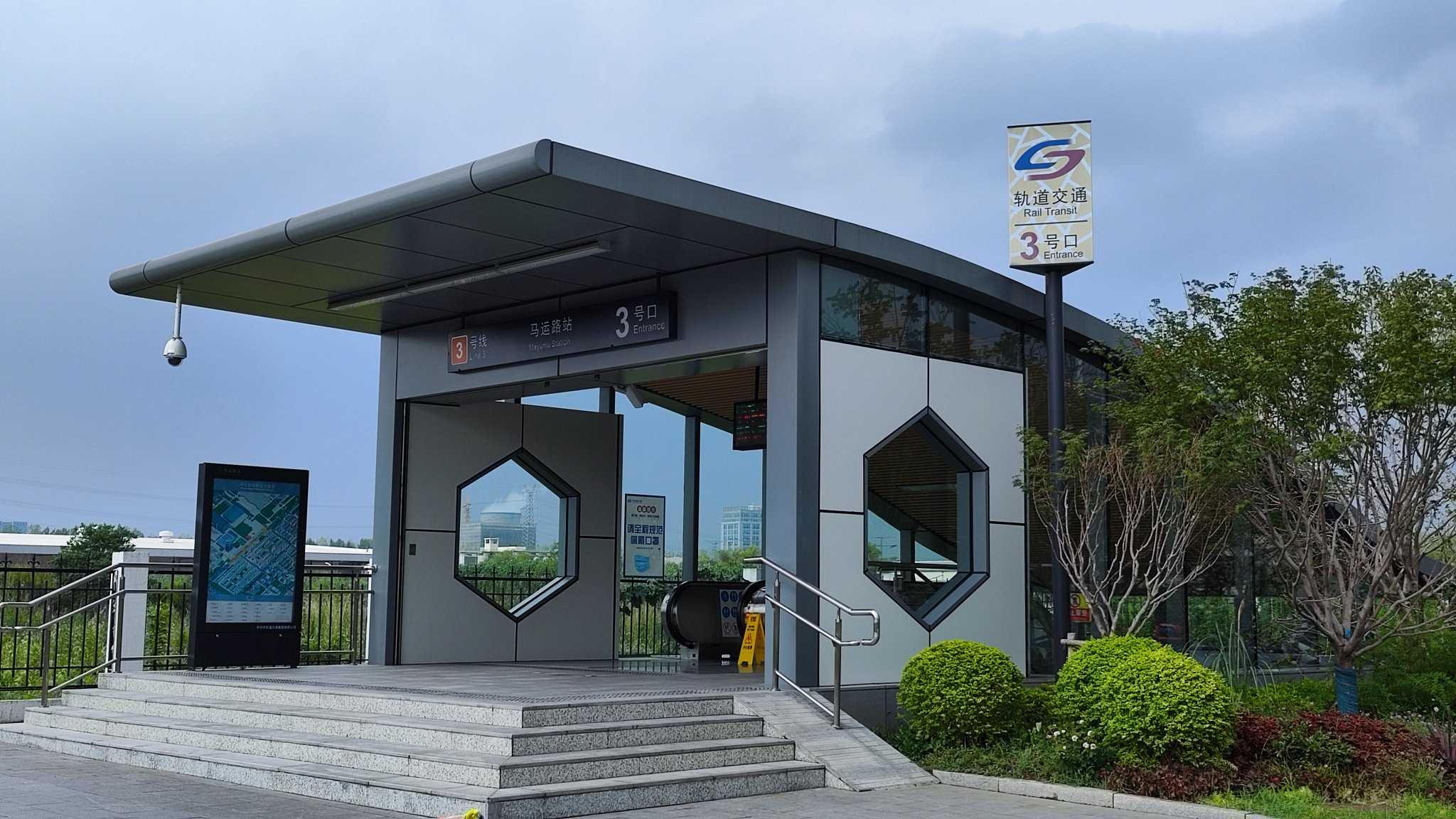

General information
- Location: Huqiu District, Suzhou, Jiangsu; China
- Coordinates: 31°19′11″N 120°32′04″E
- Operated by: Suzhou Rail Transit Co., Ltd
- Line: Line 3
- Platforms: 2 (1 island platform)

Construction
- Structure type: Underground

History
- Opened: December 25, 2019

Services
Preceding station	Suzhou Metro	Following station
Tongdun towards Suzhou Xinqu Railway Station	Line 3	Xijinqiao towards Weiting
Location

Mayunlu Station (Chinese: 马运路) is a station on Line 3 of the Suzhou Metro. The station is located in Huqiu District, Suzhou. It has been in use since December 25, 2019, when Line 3 first opened to the public.
