= Shupulu North station =

Suzhou Metro station

Coordinates: 31°16′56″N 120°40′12″E

Shupulu North 墅浦路北
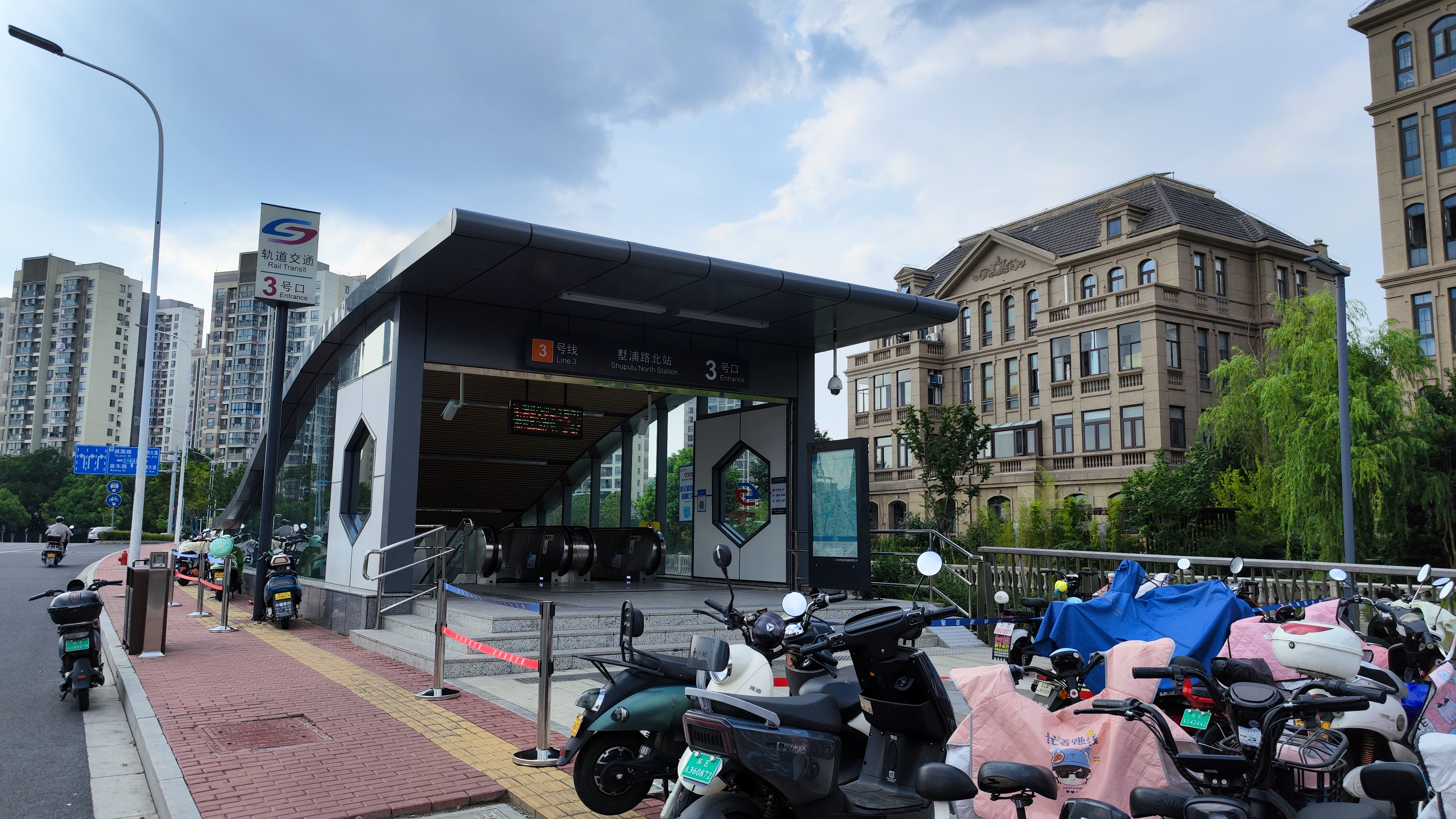

General information
- Location: Suzhou Industrial Park, Suzhou, Jiangsu; China
- Operated by: Suzhou Rail Transit Co., Ltd
- Line(s): Line 3
- Platforms: 2 (1 island platform)

Construction
- Structure type: Underground

History
- Opened: December 25, 2019

Services
Preceding station	Suzhou Metro	Following station
Tongyuanlu South towards Suzhou Xinqu Railway Station	Line 3	Dongzhenlu towards Weiting

Shupulu North Station (Chinese: 墅浦路北) is a station on Line 3 of the Suzhou Metro. The station is located in Suzhou Industrial Park, Jiangsu. It has been in use since December 25, 2019, when Line 3 first opened to the public.
