= Nibang station =

Suzhou Metro station

Nibang·Yangcheng Digital Valley 倪浜·阳澄数谷
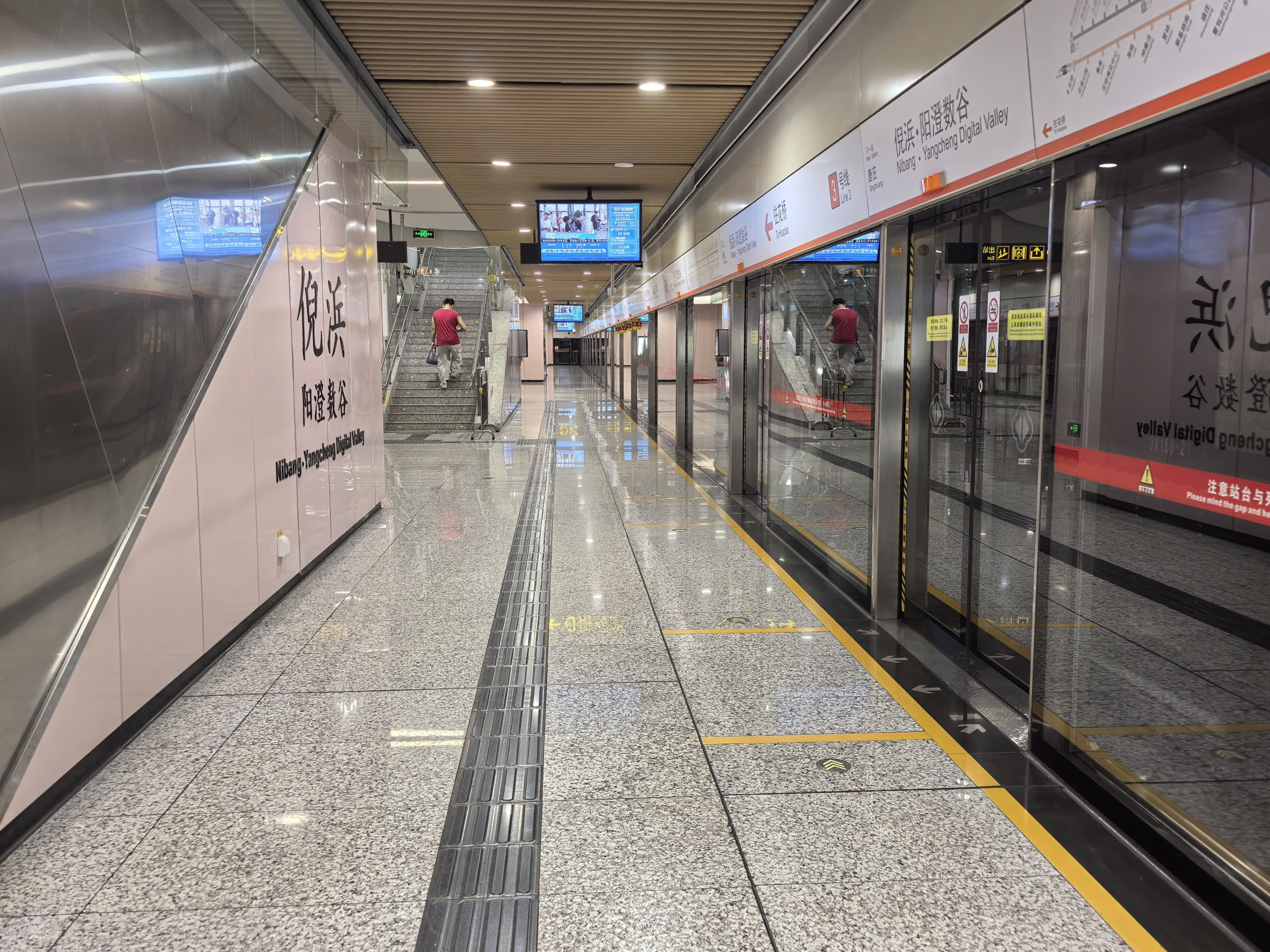
- Platform

General information
- Location: Qihang Street (启航街) × Yangfu Road (扬富路); Suzhou Industrial Park, Suzhou, Jiangsu; China
- Coordinates: 31°20′07″N 120°40′09″E
- Operated by: Suzhou Rail Transit Co., Ltd
- Line: Line 3
- Platforms: 2 (1 island platform)

Construction
- Structure type: Underground
- Accessible: Yes

History
- Opened: December 25, 2019

Services
Preceding station	Suzhou Metro	Following station
Yanyuqiao towards Suzhou Xinqu Railway Station	Line 3	Tangzhuang towards Weiting
Location

Nibang (Chinese: 倪浜), with the subname Yangcheng Digital Valley (Chinese: 阳澄数谷), is a station on Line 3 of the Suzhou Metro. The station is located in Suzhou Industrial Park, Jiangsu. It has been in use since December 25, 2019, when Line 3 first opened to the public.
