= Beiganglu station =

Suzhou Metro station

Coordinates: 31°16′19″N 120°39′10″E

Beiganglu 北港路
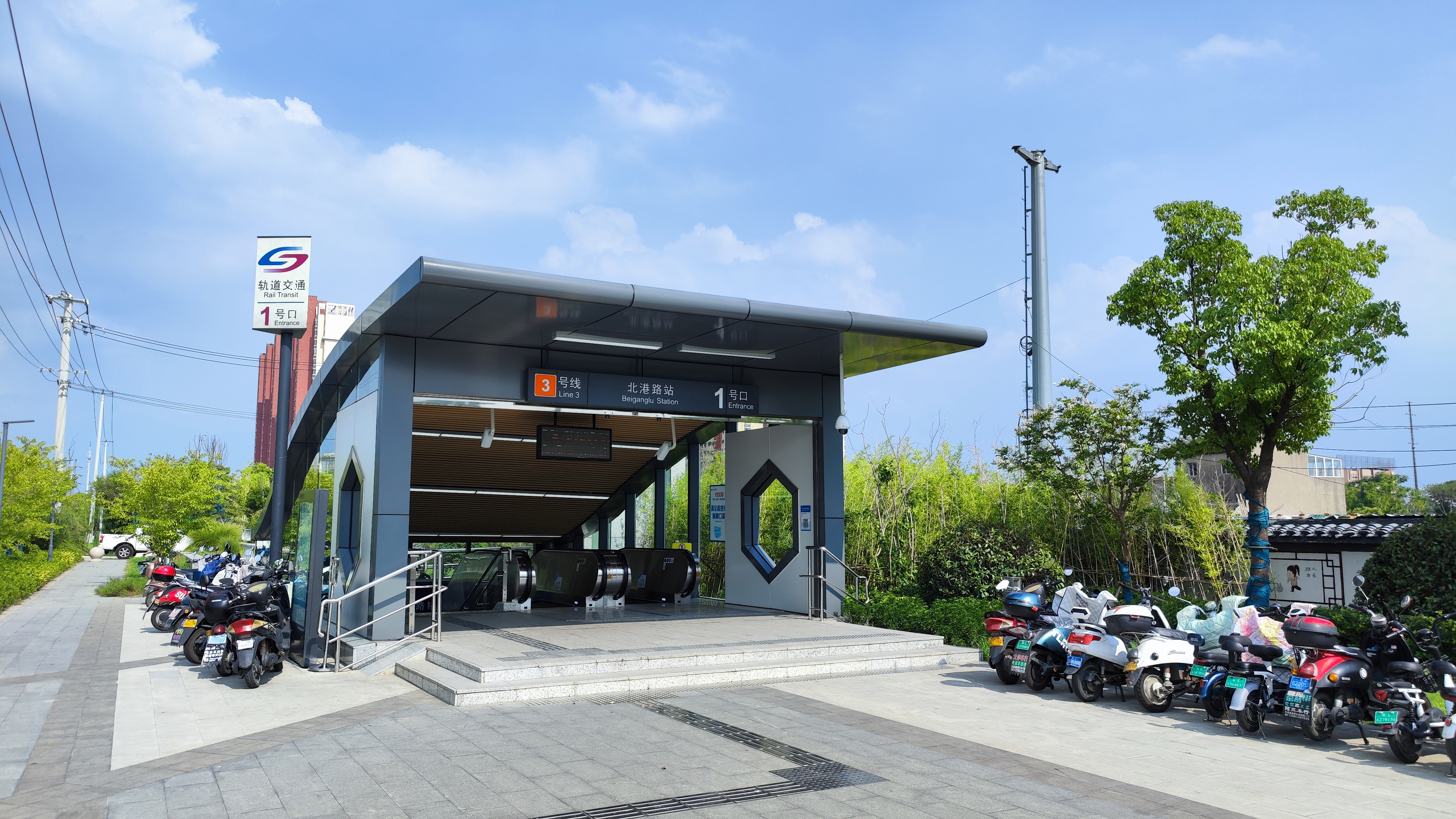

General information
- Location: Suzhou Industrial Park, Suzhou, Jiangsu; China
- Operated by: Suzhou Rail Transit Co., Ltd
- Line: Line 3
- Platforms: 2 (1 island platform)

Construction
- Structure type: Underground

History
- Opened: December 25, 2019

Services
Preceding station	Suzhou Metro	Following station
Yingchunlu towards Suzhou Xinqu Railway Station	Line 3	Tongyuanlu South towards Weiting
Location

Beiganglu Station (Chinese: 北港路) is a station on Line 3 of the Suzhou Metro. The station is located in Suzhou Industrial Park, Jiangsu. It has been in use since December 25, 2019, when Line 3 first opened to the public.
