= Wenchanglu station =

Suzhou Metro station

Coordinates: 31°21′28″N 120°31′13″E

Wenchanglu 文昌路
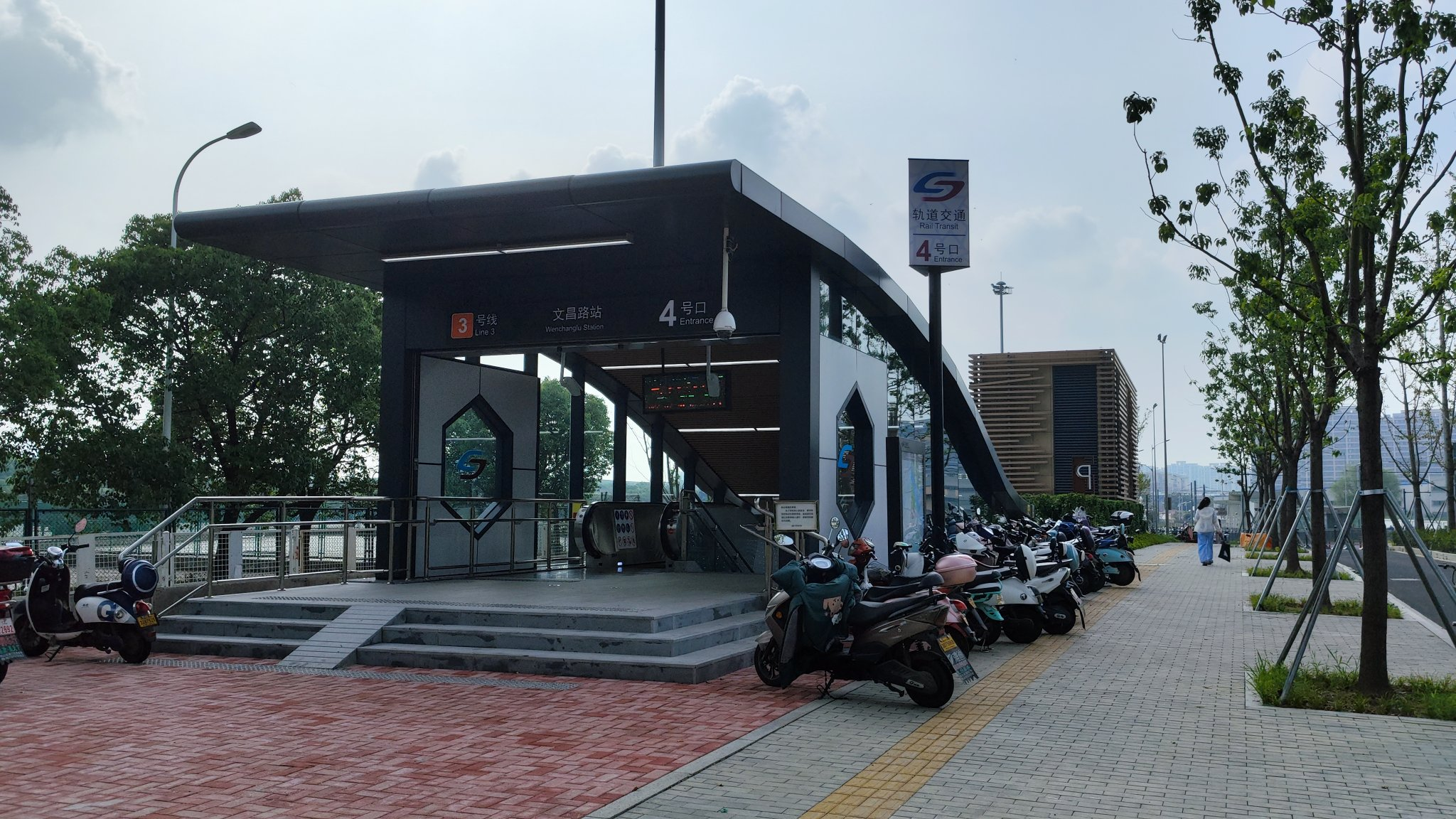

General information
- Location: Huqiu District, Suzhou, Jiangsu; China
- Operated by: Suzhou Rail Transit Co., Ltd
- Line(s): Line 3
- Platforms: 2 (1 island platform)

Construction
- Structure type: Underground

History
- Opened: December 25, 2019

Services
Preceding station	Suzhou Rail Transit	Following station
Huichanglu towards Suzhou Xinqu Railway Station	Line 3	Changting towards Weiting

Wenchanglu Station (Chinese: 文昌路) is a station on Line 3 of the Suzhou Metro. The station is located in Huqiu District of Suzhou. It has been in use since December 25, 2019, the same time of the opening of Line 3.
