= Gexiangjie station =

Suzhou Metro station

Coordinates: 31°21′54″N 120°46′25″E

Gexiangjie 戈巷街
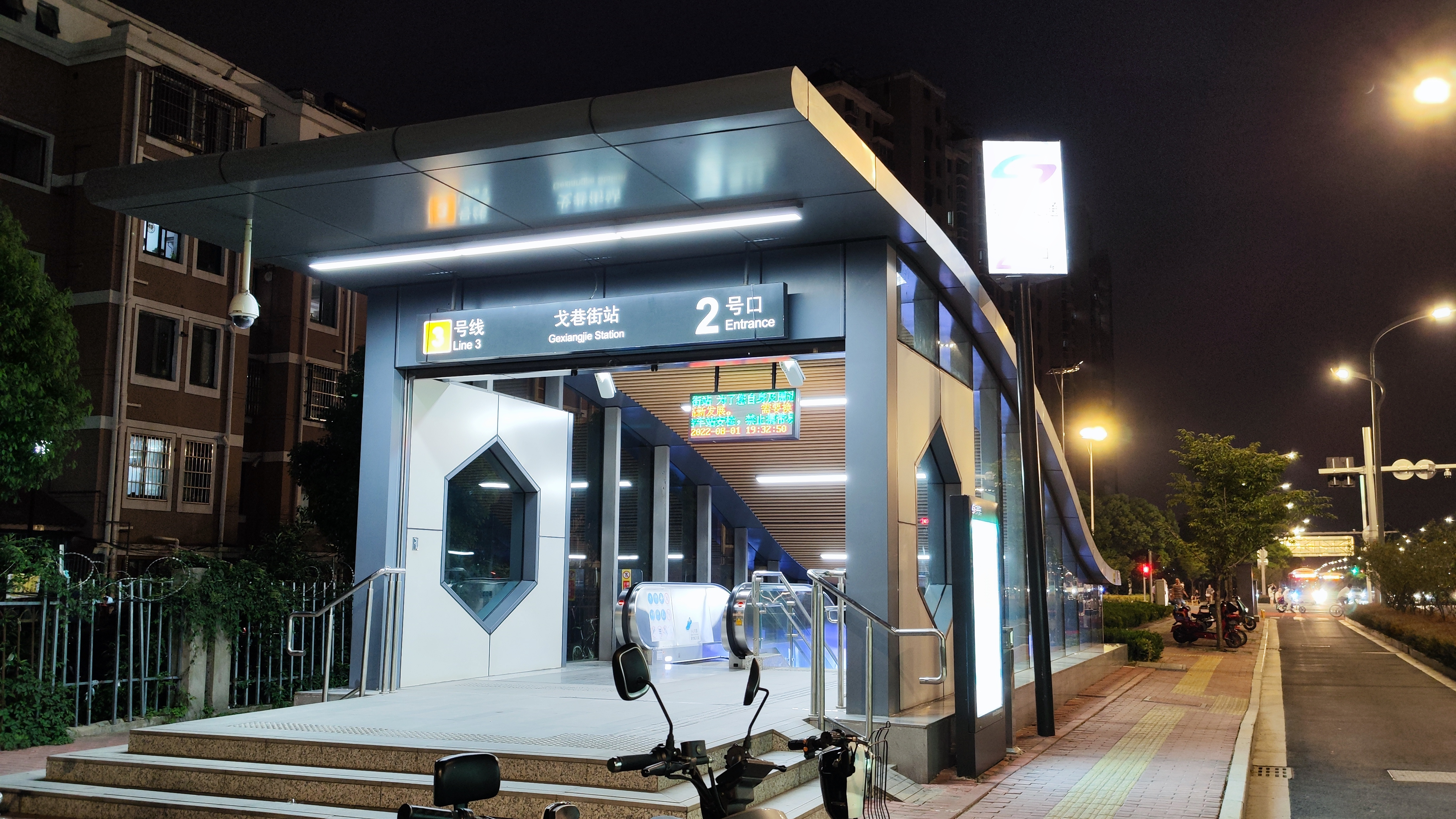

General information
- Location: Suzhou Industrial Park, Suzhou, Jiangsu; China
- Operated by: Suzhou Rail Transit Co., Ltd
- Line: Line 3
- Platforms: 2 (1 island platform)

Construction
- Structure type: Underground

History
- Opened: December 25, 2019

Services
Preceding station	Suzhou Metro	Following station
Fengtingdadao towards Suzhou Xinqu Railway Station	Line 3	Weiting Terminus

Gexiangjie Station (Chinese: 戈巷街) is a station on Line 3 of the Suzhou Metro. The station is located in Suzhou Industrial Park, Jiangsu. It has been in use since December 25, 2019, when Line 3 first opened to the public.
