= Huichanglu station =

Suzhou Metro station

Coordinates: 31°21′48″N 120°31′30″E

Huichanglu 惠昌路
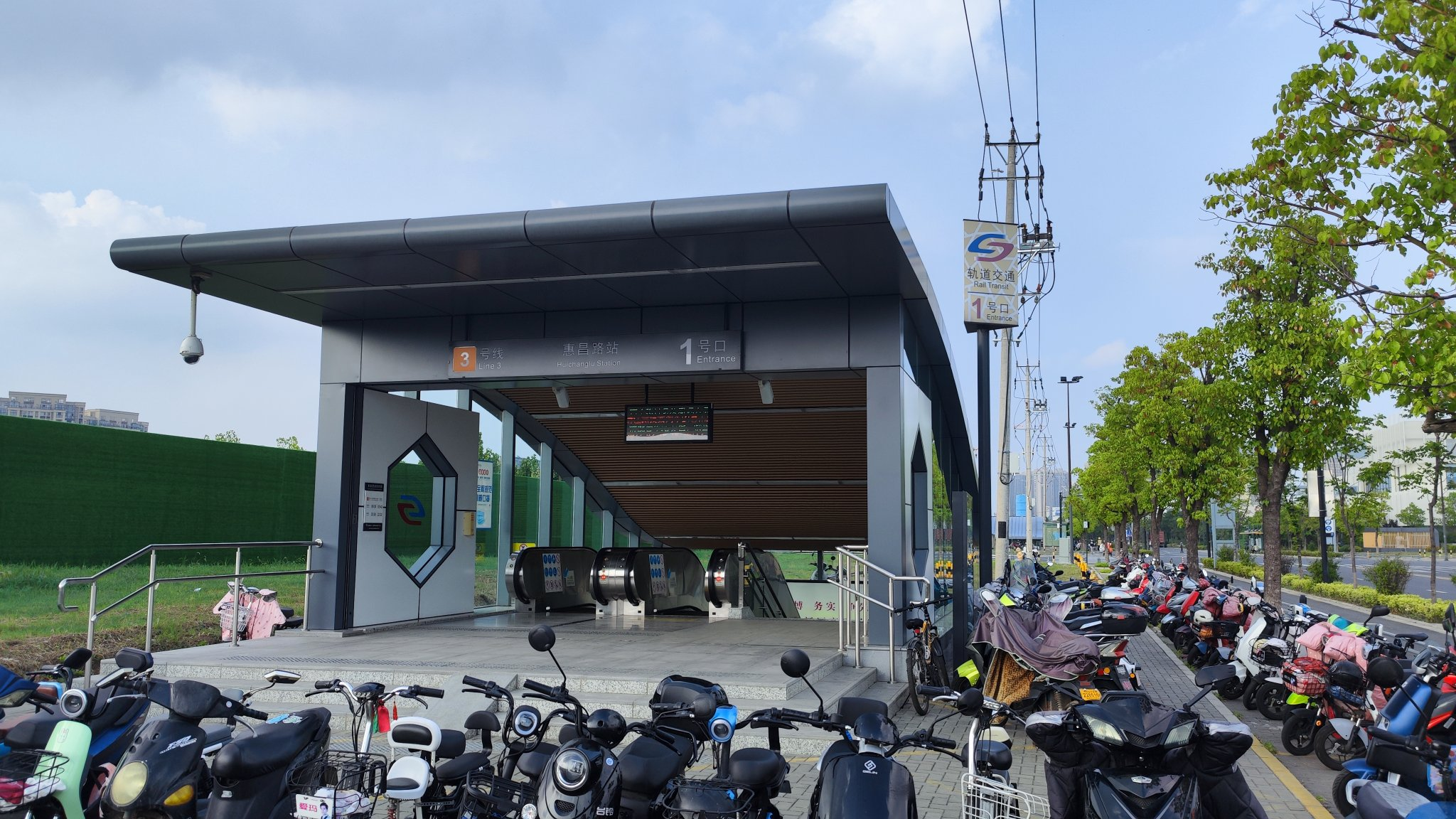

General information
- Location: Huqiu District, Suzhou, Jiangsu; China
- Operated by: Suzhou Rail Transit Co., Ltd
- Line(s): Line 3
- Platforms: 2 (1 island platform)

Construction
- Structure type: Underground

History
- Opened: December 25, 2019

Services
| Preceding station | Suzhou Rail Transit | Following station |
|---|---|---|
| Suzhou Xinqu Railway Station Terminus | Line 3 | Wenchanglu towards Weiting |

Huichanglu Station (Chinese: 惠昌路) is a station on Line 3 of the Suzhou Metro. The station is located in Huqiu District of Suzhou. It has been in use since December 25, 2019, the same time of the opening of Line 3.
