= Suzhoutong =

Smart Card used in Suzhou, China

- Location: Suzhou
- Currency: CNY¥
- Validity: Suzhou Buses; Suzhou Metro; Suzhou BRT; Suzhou Taxis; Cooperating supermarkets and restaurants etc.
- Website: http://www.szcic.com/

Suzhoutong (Chinese: 苏州通) is a multi-use, store-value and contactless smart card used in Suzhou, Jiangsu, China, for public transport and other daily uses. It is similar to Beijing's Beijing Municipal Administration and Communications Card (Yikatong, 一卡通). In 2012, Suzhou Citizen Card was introduced by social security department of Suzhou, as well as the Suzhou Bank. According to the issuing company, Suzhoutong will be replaced by the Suzhou Citizen Card, which has more features.
