= Suzhou Tram =

Tram system in Suzhou, China

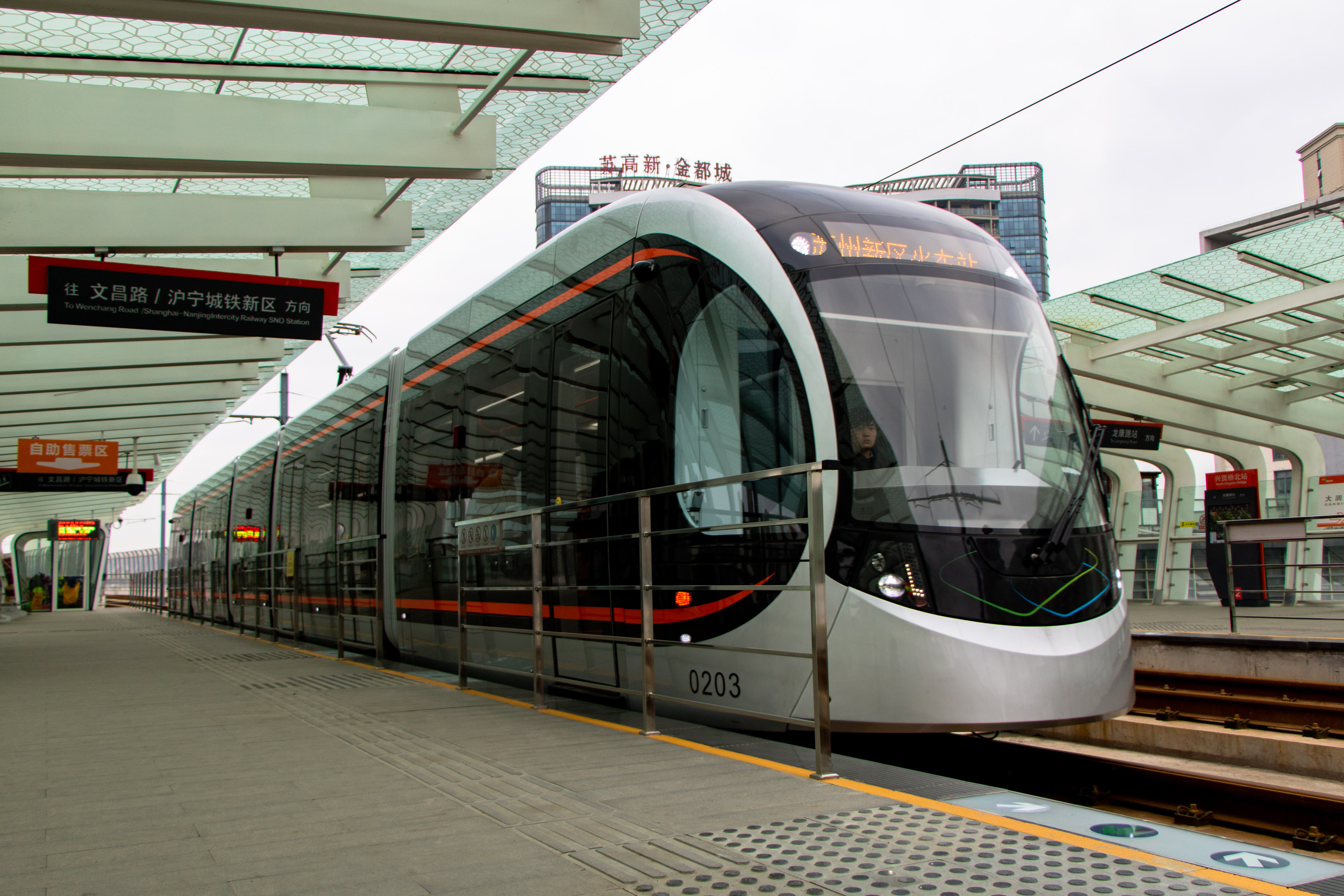

Overview
- Locale: Suzhou, China
- Transit type: Tram
- Number of lines: 2
- Number of stations: 27

Operation
- Began operation: October 26, 2014; 12 years ago
- Reporting marks: SNDT

Technical
- System length: 46.10 km (28.65 mi)
- Track gauge: 1,435 mm (4 ft 8 1/2 in) standard gauge
- Electrification: 750 V DC Overhead line

The Suzhou SND Tram (Chinese: 苏州高新区有轨电车) is a tram system in Suzhou New District, Suzhou, Jiangsu, China. The tram uses an overhead catenery system. Suzhou Tram started construction on September 11, 2012 and was opened on October 26, 2014. There is currently two lines in operation in the Suzhou New District. The Suzhou High-Tech Rail Tram Limited was established in April 2011, and the tram line was approved by the Suzhou City government June the same year.

== Operations ==
=== Tram routes ===
- Line 1 – Shizishan to Xiyangshan, known as the longest tram route in China
- Line 2 main route – Suzhou Xinqu Railway Station to NJU East
- Line 2 branch route – Wenchang Lu to Longkang Lu

=== Depots & termini ===
The tram depot is at Yangshan (for tram Line 1) and Tong'an (for tram Line 2). The terminus of line 1 are Shizishan and Xiyangshan, while terminus of line 2 are Longkanglu, Suzhou Xinqu Railway Station and Wenchanglu.

=== Alignment and interchanges ===
The tram routes runs on reserved grassed track at middle of the road.

There is an interchange with Suzhou Metro Line 1 and Line 3 – at Shizishan.

=== Rolling stock ===
18 100% low-floor bidirectional trams manufactured by CRRC Nanjing Puzhen, based on the Bombardier Flexity 2; 32.2 m (105 ft 7 3/4 in) long and 2.65 m (8 ft 8 3/8 in) wide. All trams are low floor, fully air conditioned, can run high speed. Each tram has five cars. It takes electricity via pantograph.

== Stations ==
=== Line 1 ===
All stations are located in Huqiu District.

Station name		Connections
English	Chinese	Connections
Shizishan	狮子山	1 3
Xinqu Park	新区公园	
Heshan Lu	何山路	
Baimajian Ecological Garden	白马涧生态园	
Majian Lu	马涧路	
Yangshan South	阳山南	
High Tech Zone Administrative Committee	高新区管委会	
Longshan Lu	龙山路	
Jialingjiang Lu	嘉陵江路	
Longkang Lu	龙康路	Line 2
Xiu'an	秀岸	
Xiupinjie North	绣品街北	
Shifan	石帆	
Xiyangshan	西洋山	

=== Line 2 ===
All stations are located in Huqiu District.

Service Routes		Station name		Connections
main	branch	English	Chinese	Connections
●		NJU East	南京大学东	
●		Longtanggang Lu	龙塘港路	
|	●	Longkang Lu	龙康路	Line 1
●	●	Hangchuanbang	航船浜	
●	●	Lijiang Lu	漓江路	
●	●	Engushan	恩顾山	
●	●	Bailongqiao	白龙桥	
●	●	Shushan	树山	
●	●	Tong'an	通安	
●	●	Huatong Huayuan South	华通花园南	
●	●	Jiantongqiao	建通桥	
●	●	Huliu	虎疁	
●	●	Xingxianqiao North	兴贤桥北	
●	●	Hongfu Lu	鸿福路	
●	｜	Suzhou Xinqu Railway Station	苏州新区火车站	ITH; 3 6
	●	Wenchang Lu	文昌路	3

== Gallery ==
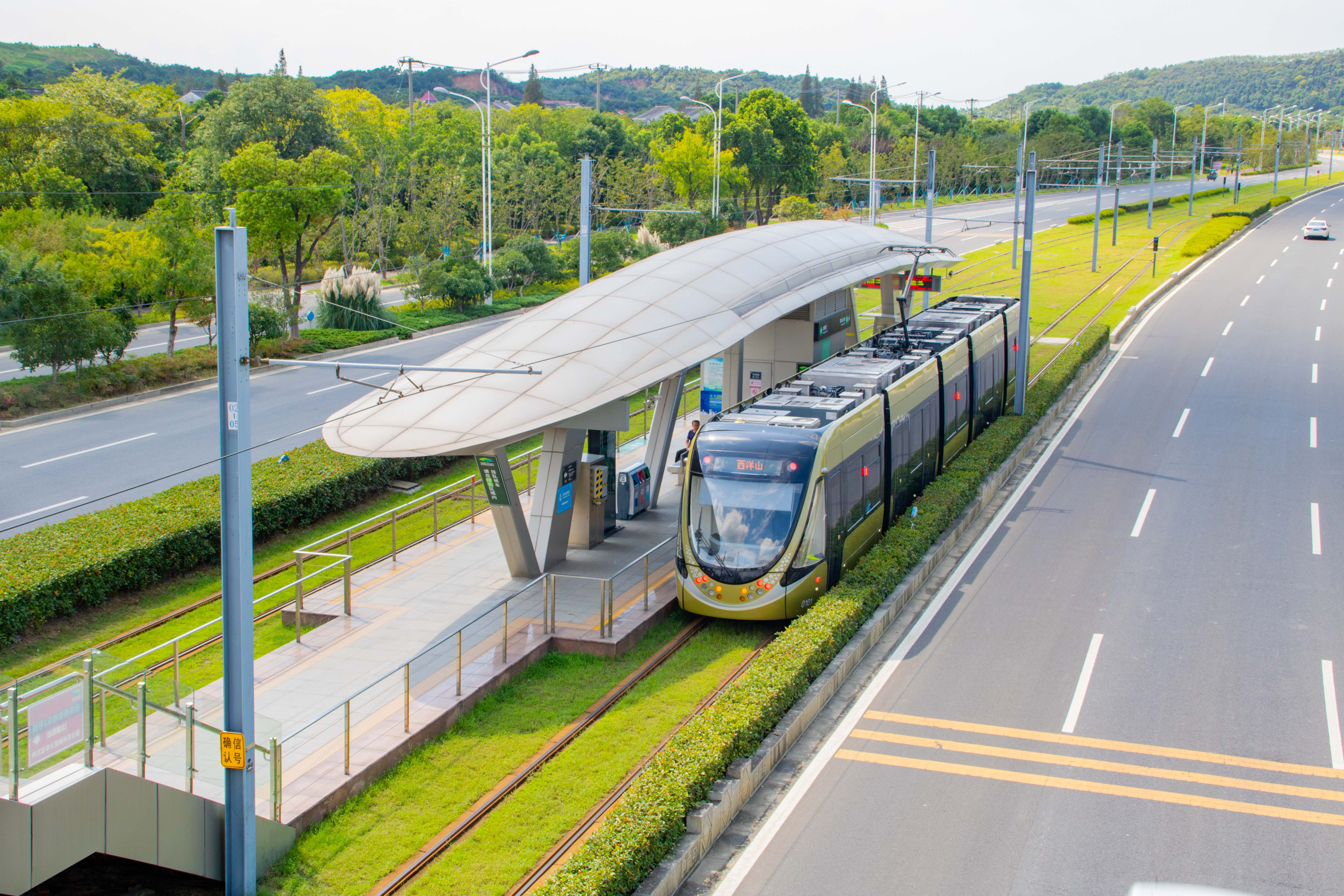
A Line 1 tram in Longkang Lu station

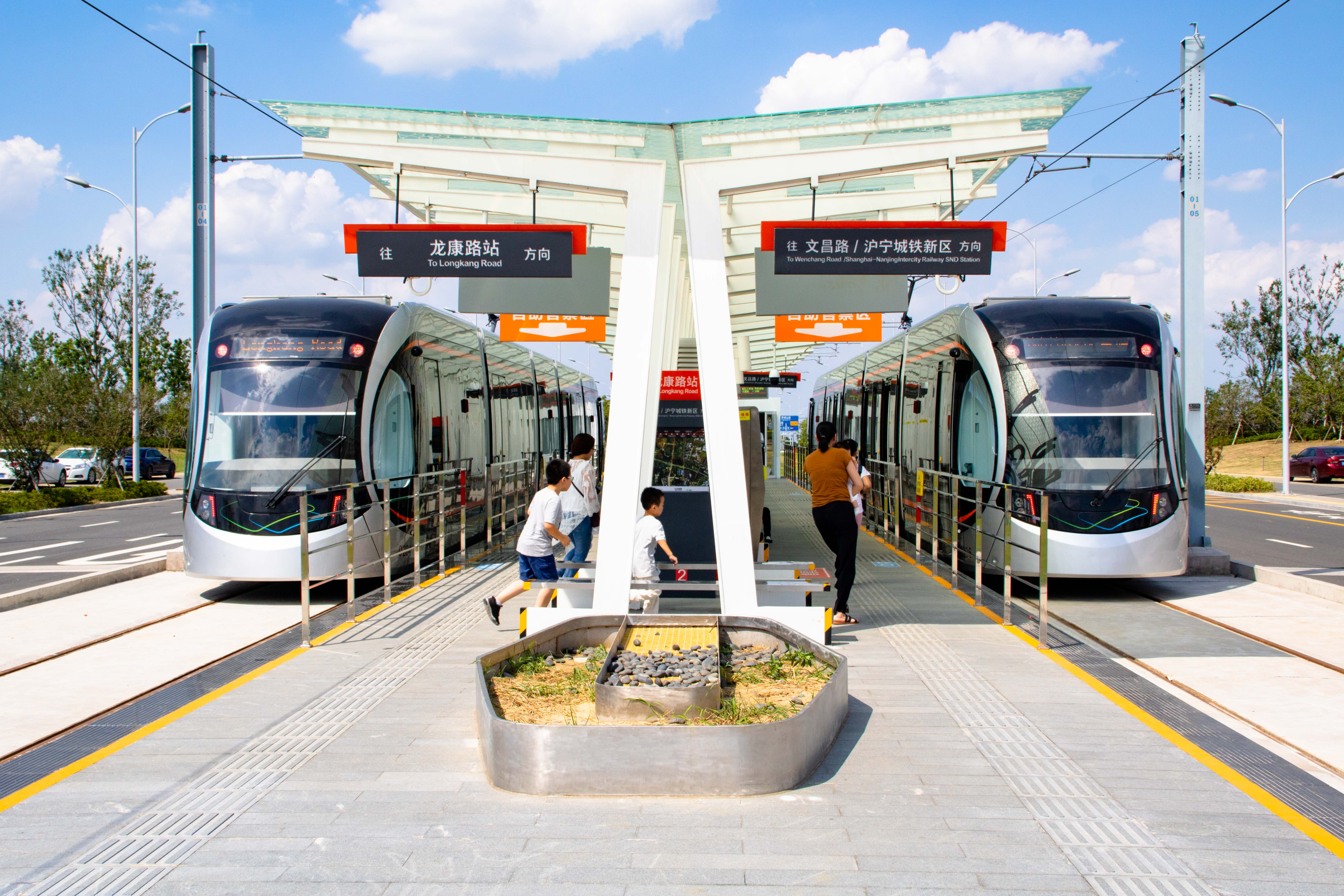
A Line 2 tram in Longkang Lu station

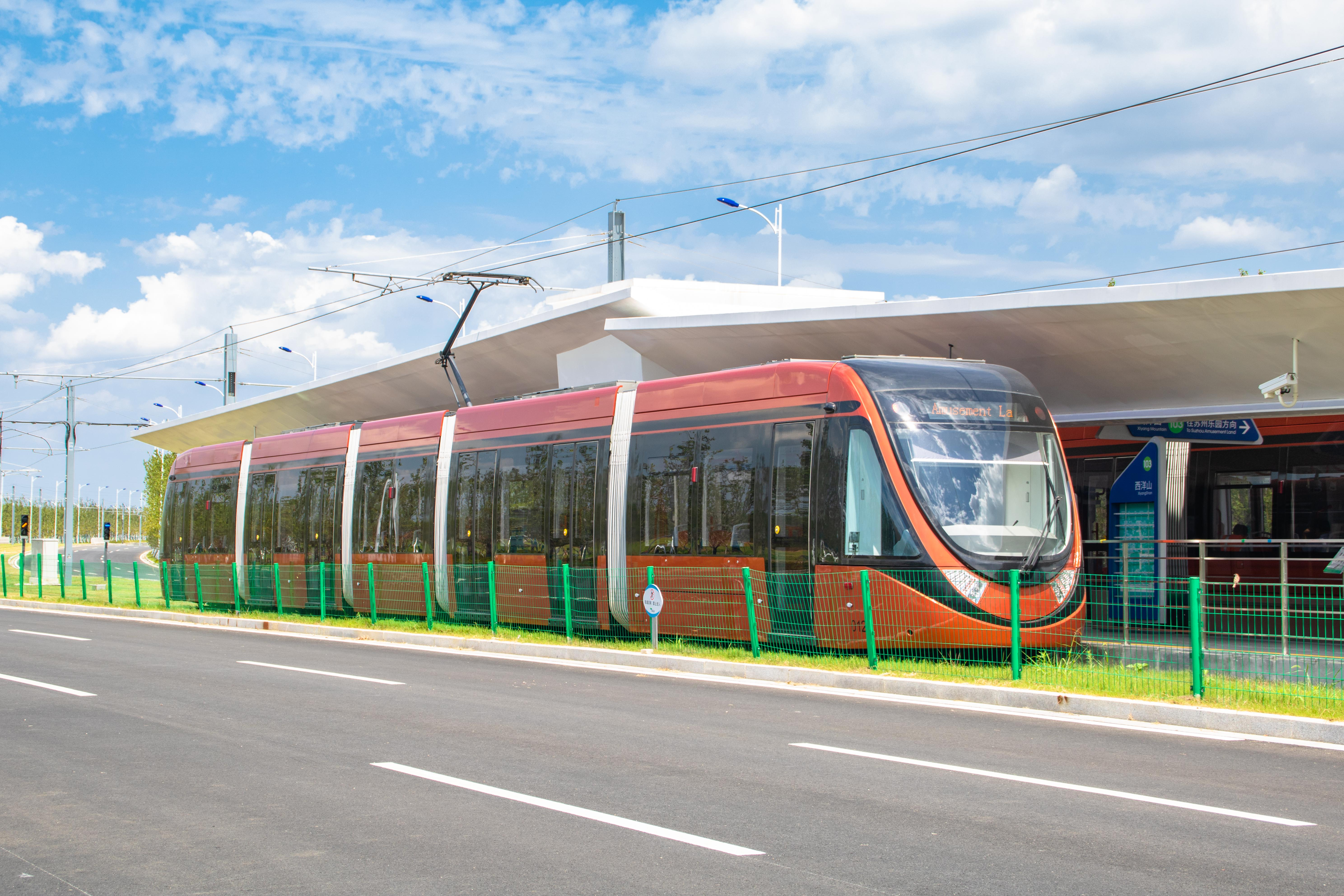
A tram in Xiyangshan station

== See also ==
- Suzhou Metro
