= Line 3 (Suzhou Metro) =

Metro line in Suzhou, Jiangsu, China

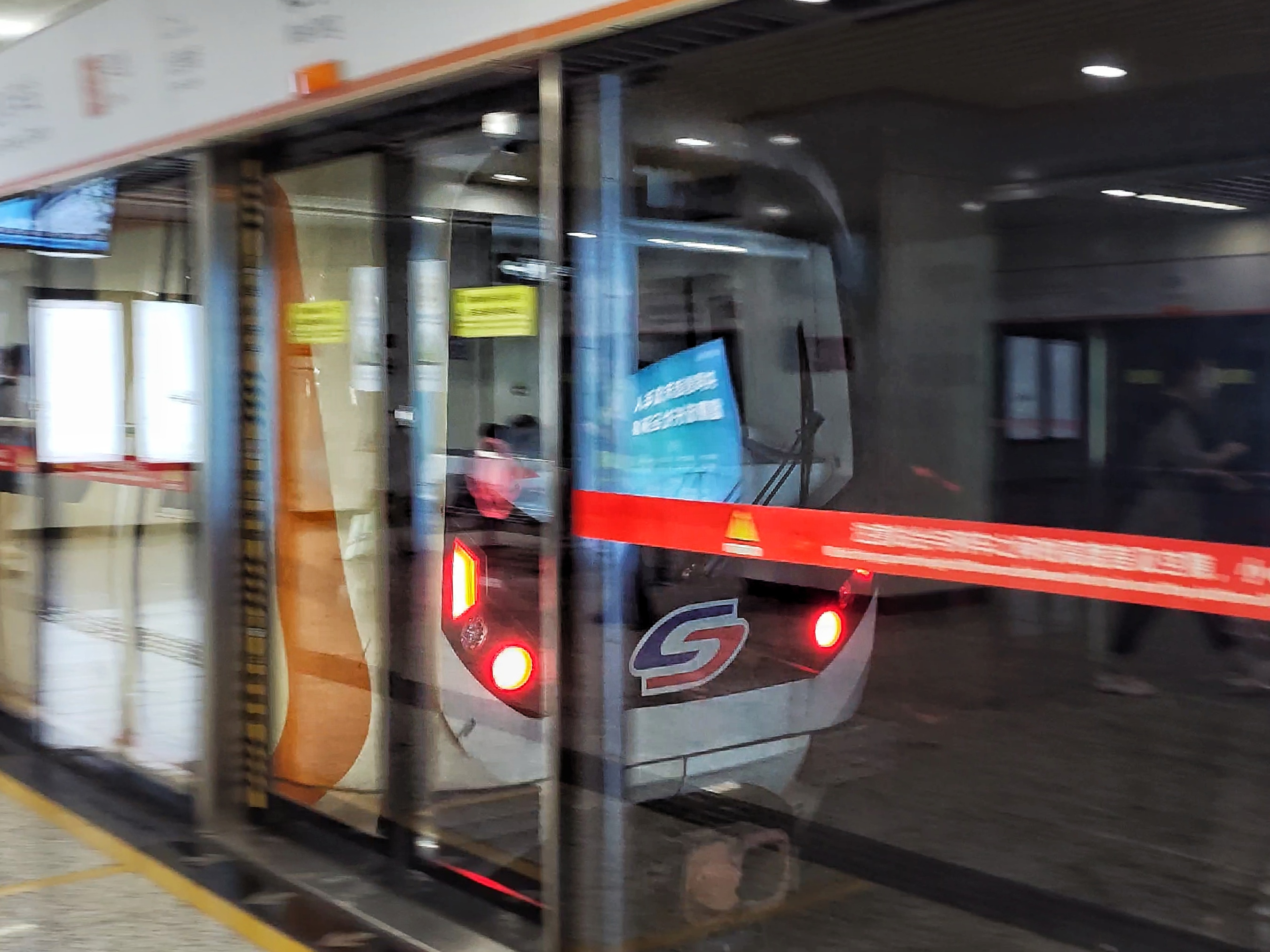
- A train of Suzhou Metro Line 3

Overview
- Status: In operation
- Owner: Suzhou Rail Transit Co., Ltd
- Termini: Suzhou Xinqu Railway Station; Weiting
- Stations: 37

Service
- Type: Rapid transit
- System: Suzhou Metro
- Operator(s): Suzhou Rail Transit Co., Ltd

History
- Opened: 25 December 2019; 6 years ago

Technical
- Line length: 45.272 km (28.131 mi)
- Track gauge: 1,435 mm (4 ft 8 1/2 in)

Line 3 is an east-west line of the Suzhou Metro. The line is 45.272 kilometers long. The line links the Wuzhong District, Suzhou Industrial Park, and the Suzhou New District.

Line 3 started trial operations from December 6 to December 10, 2019. Official operation started on December 25, 2019.

== Stations ==
=== Service routes ===
- Suzhou Xinqu Railway Station — Huaqiao (Line 11)
- Suzhou Xinqu Railway Station — Fengtingdadao, in rush hours

Service routes		Station name		Connections	Distance km		Location
Service routes		English	Chinese	Connections	Distance km		Location
●	●	Suzhou Xinqu Railway Station	苏州新区火车站	6 ITH; Tram line 2	0.00	0.00	Huqiu
●	●	Huichanglu	惠昌路				Huqiu
●	●	Wenchanglu	文昌路	Tram line 2 (branch)			Huqiu
●	●	Changting	长亭				Huqiu
●	●	Tongdun	铜墩				Huqiu
●	●	Mayunlu	马运路				Huqiu
●	●	Xijinqiao	西津桥	8 9			Huqiu
●	●	Heshan	何山				Huqiu
●	●	Shizishan	狮子山	1 Tram line 1			Huqiu
●	●	Shishanlu	狮山路				Huqiu
●	●	Shajinqiao	沙金桥				Huqiu
●	●	Suoshanqiao West	索山桥西	5			Huqiu
●	●	Hengshan	横山				Huqiu
●	●	Hengtang	横塘				Huqiu
●	●	Shihu North	石湖北				Huqiu
●	●	Xinguo	新郭				Gusu
●	●	Panlilu	盘蠡路	2			Wuzhong
●	●	Baodailu	宝带路	4			Wuzhong
●	●	Yingchunlu	迎春路				Wuzhong
●	●	Beiganglu	北港路				Wuzhong
●	●	Tongyuanlu South	通园路南	7			SIP
●	●	Shupulu North	墅浦路北				SIP
●	●	Dongzhenlu	东振路				SIP
●	●	Jinsheqiao	金厍桥	5			SIP
●	●	Ligongdi West	李公堤西	6			SIP
●	●	Dongfangzhimen	东方之门	1			SIP
●	●	Yanyuqiao	烟雨桥	9			SIP
●	●	Nibang	倪浜				SIP
●	●	Tangzhuang	唐庄	8			SIP
●	●	Kuatang	跨塘				SIP
●	●	Suzhou Yuanqu Railway Station	苏州园区火车站	8 KAH			SIP
●	●	Fangwanjie	方湾街				SIP
●	●	Fenghelu	丰和路				SIP
●	●	Shuangmajie	双马街				SIP
●	●	Fengtingdadao	葑亭大道	5			SIP
	●	Gexiangjie	戈巷街				SIP
	●	Weiting	唯亭				SIP
	↓	Through service to/from Huaqiao on 11					

=== Through service ===
Through service between Line 3 and Line 11 started on December 23, 2023. During 23 December 2023 and 29 June 2024, with through train to/from line 11, Gexiangjie and Weiting were only served by Line 11 trains.

== Rolling stock ==
Fleet numbers	Year built	Time in service	Builder	Class	Number in service	No of car	Assembly	Rolling stock	Number	Depots	Line assigned	Notes
300 (50 sets)	2017-2021	2018-present	CRRC Nanjing Puzhen	B	60 (10 sets)	6	Tc+Mp+M - M + Mp+Tc	PM101; PM102; PM116	030101-035006 (0301-0350)	Songling Depot; Yuanhe Yard	4	All cars will be converted to PM259 after the first overhaul and re-equipped to Line 7 by late 2024. Cars assigned to Line 3 service out of regular service since June 29, 2024 and removed from the service since September 28, 2024.
300 (50 sets)	2023-present	2024-present	CRRC Nanjing Puzhen	B	210 (35 sets)	6	Tc+Mp+M - M + Mp+Tc	PM247	030101-035006 (0301-0350)	Xushuguan Depot; South Weiting Yard; Chaoyang Road Depot; Huaqiao Yard	3 11	

== Map ==
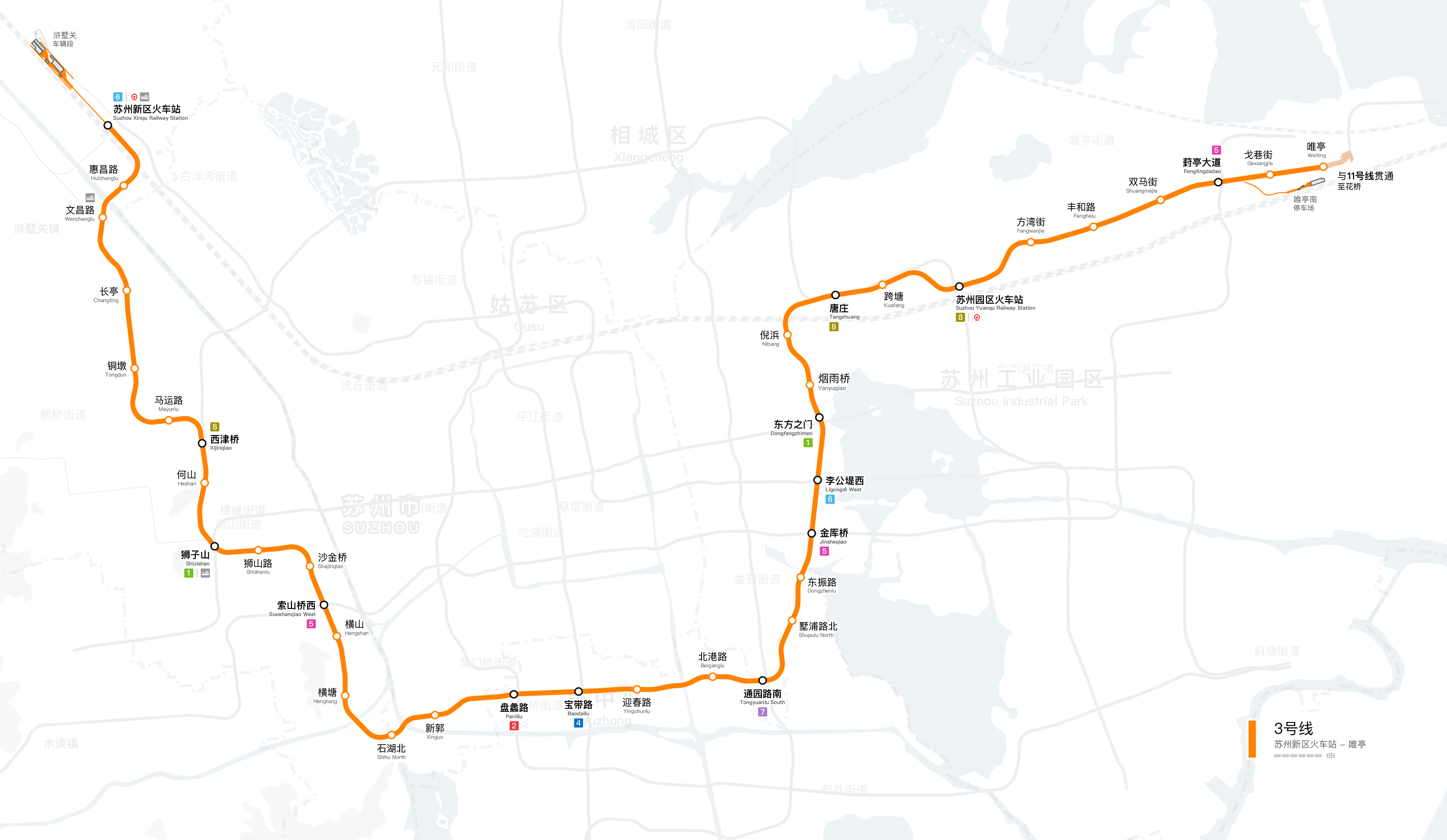

== Gallery ==
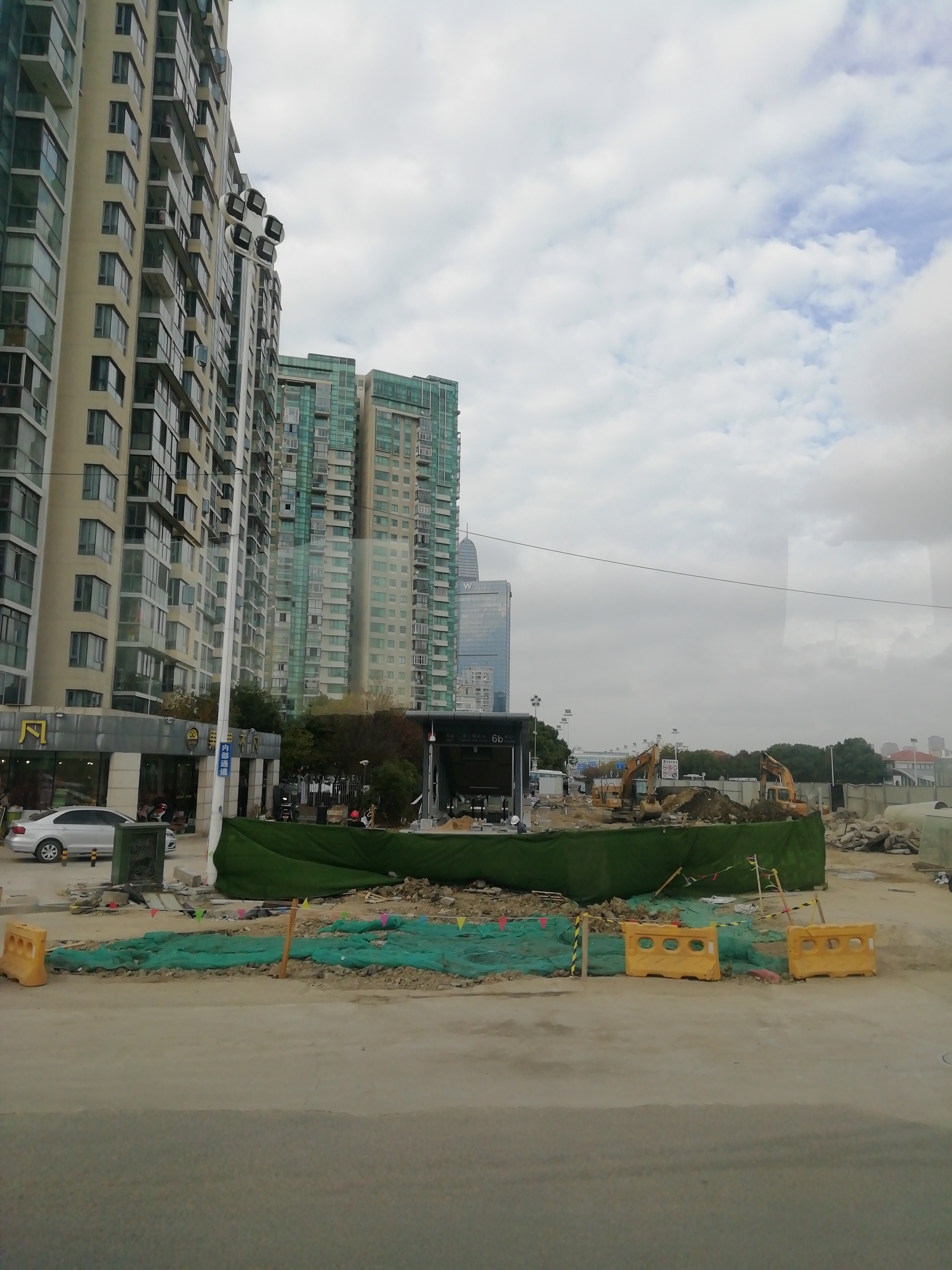
An image of Exit 6b of Ligongdi West Station, under construction, taken a few weeks before the opening.

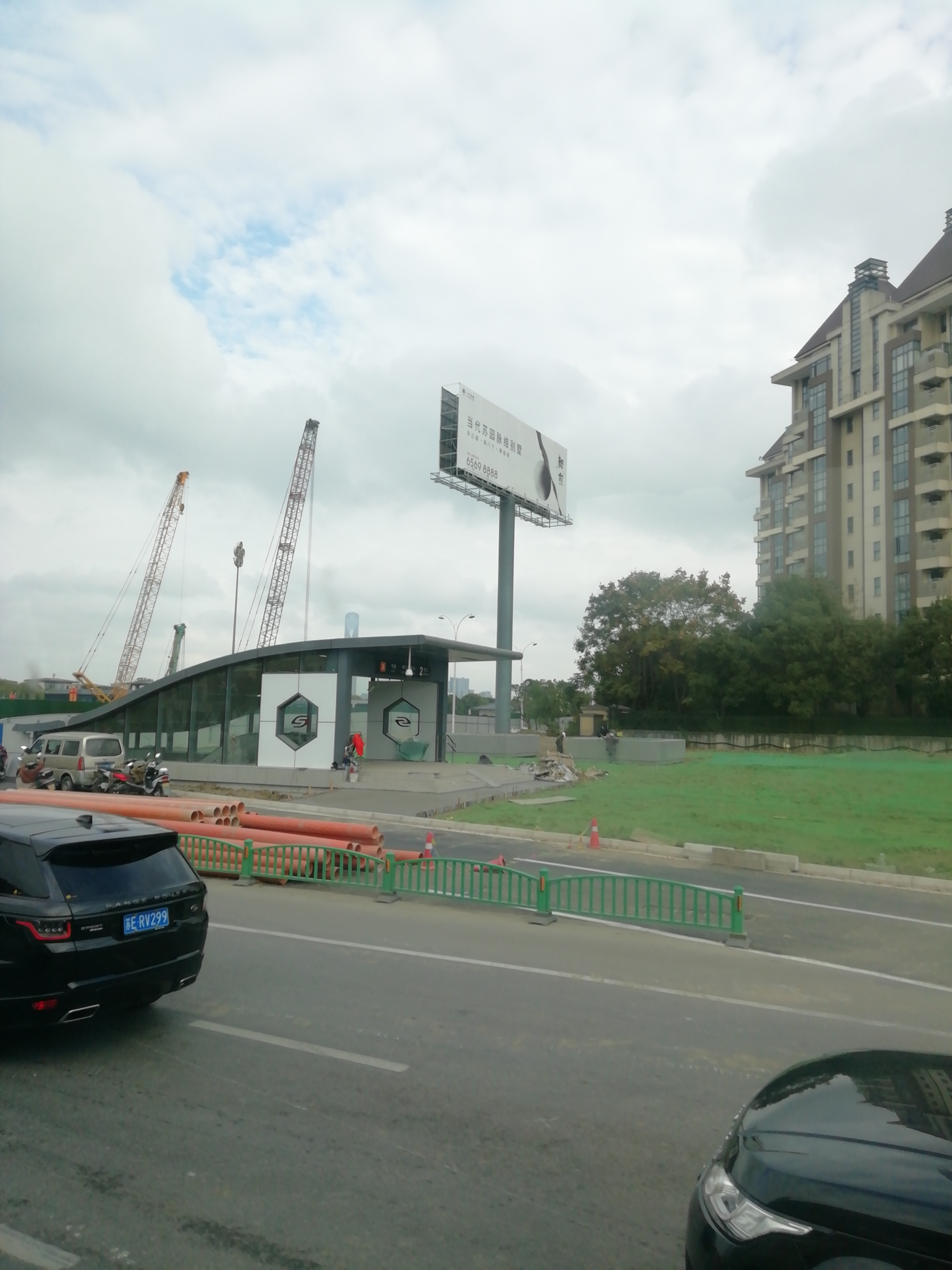
An image of Exit 2 of Ligongdi West Station, under construction, taken a few weeks before the opening.
