= Suzhou BRT =

Bus service in Suzhou, Jiangsu, China

Overview
- Locale: Suzhou
- Transit type: Bus rapid transit
- Number of lines: 5
- Number of stations: 106
- Daily ridership: 50,000

Operation
- Began operation: 2008
- Operators: Suzhou Public Transportation Co., Ltd; Suzhou Industrial Park Public Transportation Co., Ltd; Suzhou New District Public Transportation Co., Ltd; Suzhou Wuzhong District Public Transportation Co., Ltd
- Number of vehicles: 120+
- Headway: 6min~15min

Technical
- System length: 95 kilometers (59 mi)
- Average speed: 40km/h

Suzhou Bus Rapid Transit (Chinese: 苏州快速公交) is a bus rapid transit system in Suzhou, Jiangsu, China. It began operation in 2008 with 27.1 km of service. The system was expanded in 2008, 2009 and 2010, and now Suzhou BRT operates 5 lines, with 106 bus stations and a total of 95 kilometers in length. The 5 lines fully operate in Bus Express Lane Road and Elevated Road to ensure on-schedule and express travel.
