= Suzhou Metro =

Rapid transit system in Suzhou, China

Chinese name
- Simplified Chinese: 苏州地铁
Transcriptions
Standard Mandarin
- Hanyu Pinyin: Sūzhōu Dìtiě

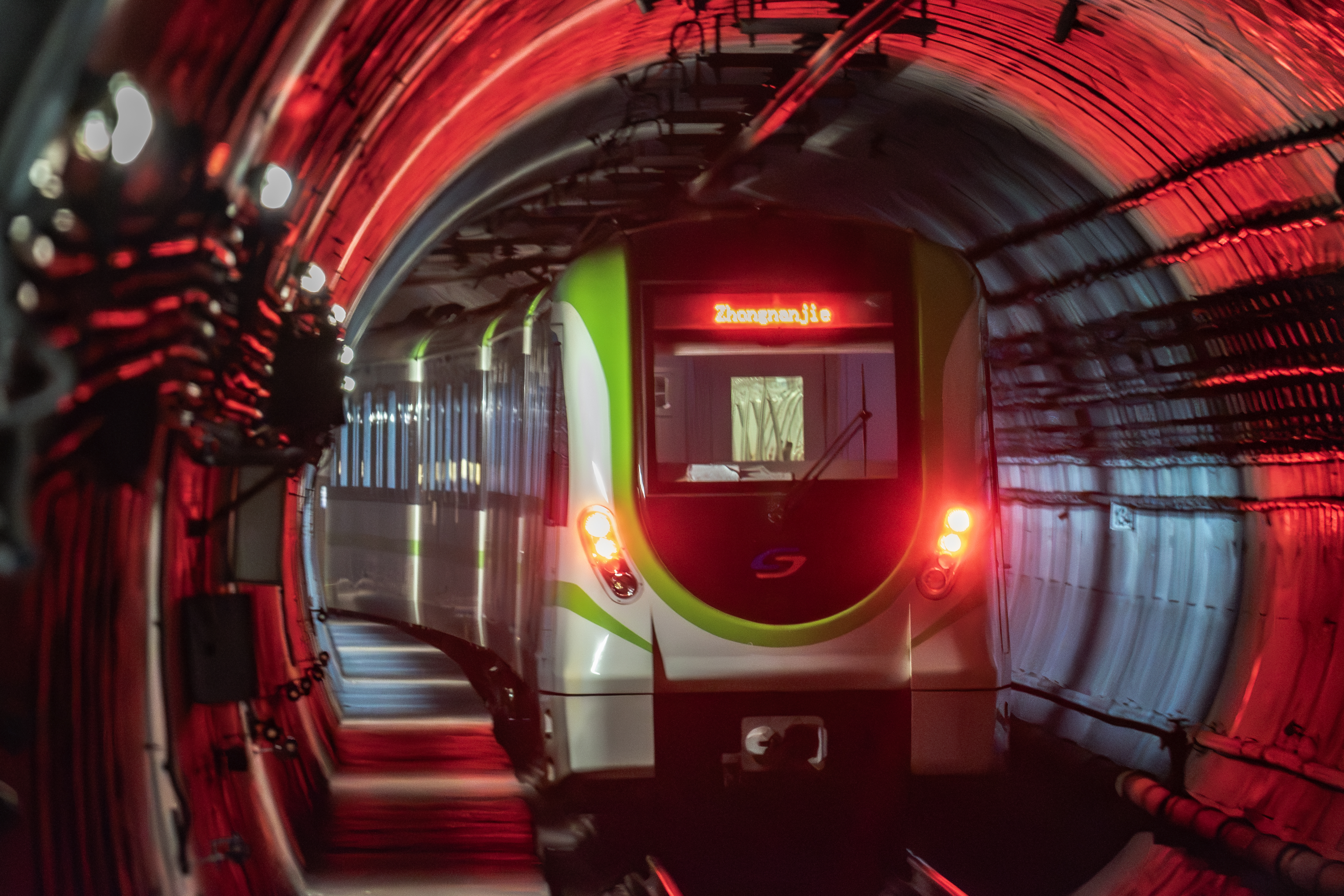
- Line 1 train

Overview
- Locale: Suzhou, Jiangsu, China
- Transit type: Rapid transit
- Number of lines: 9 (in operation)
- Number of stations: 285
- Daily ridership: 1.935 million (2025 average).
- Annual ridership: 700 million (2025)
- Website: http://www.sz-mtr.com/ (Chinese)

Operation
- Began operation: April 28, 2012; 14 years ago

Technical
- System length: 345 km (214 mi)
- Track gauge: 1,435 mm (4 ft 8 1/2 in) standard gauge
- Electrification: 1.5 kV Overhead Wire
System map
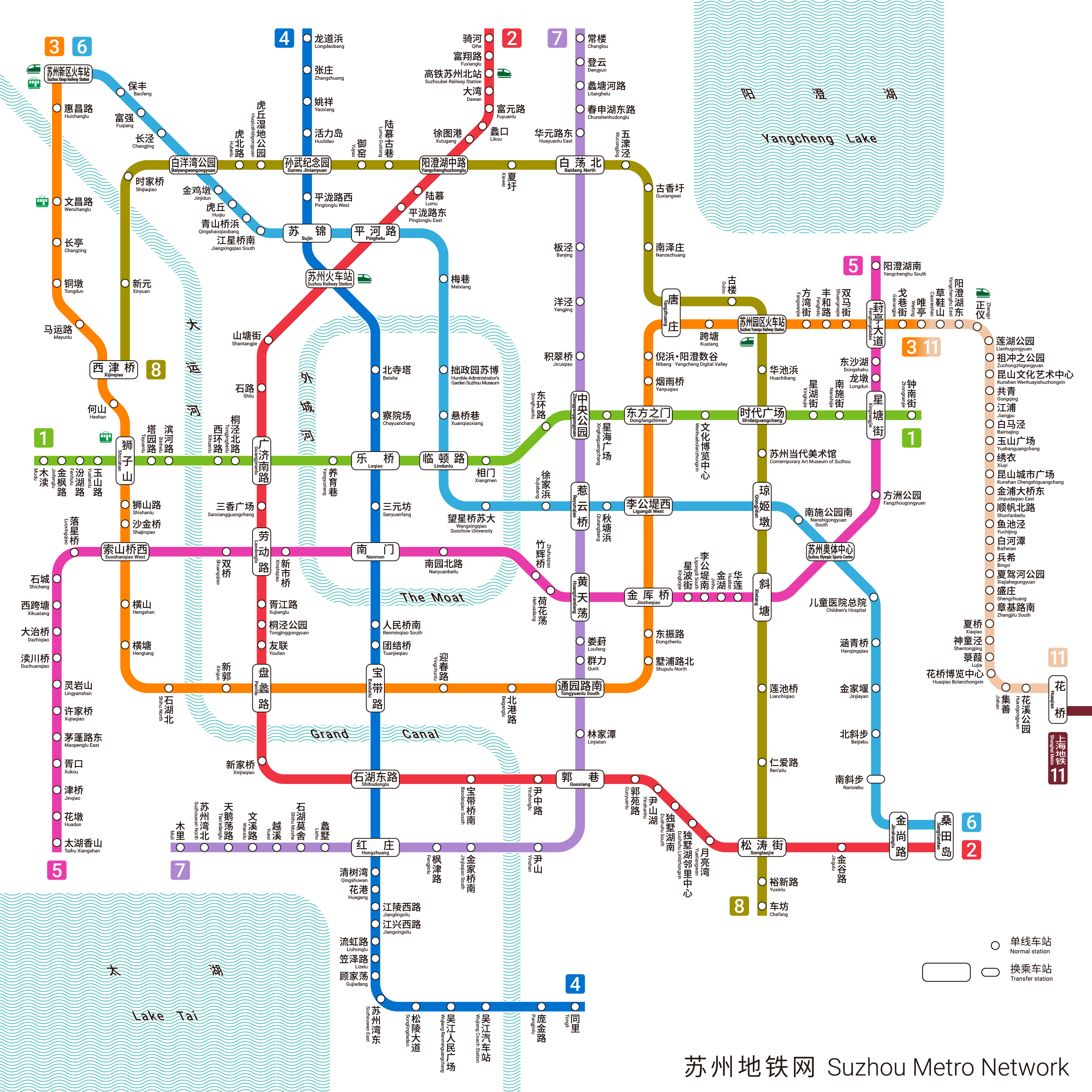

Suzhou Metro, previously known as Suzhou Rail Transit, is a rapid transit system serving the city of Suzhou, in Jiangsu Province, China. Line 1 began operation on April 28, 2012. Line 2 opened on December 28, 2013. A further three lines, and an extension of Line 2, were completed between 2016 and 2021. Line 11, connecting Kunshan city which is under Suzhou's administration, and beyond to the Shanghai Metro, was completed on June 24, 2023, and a further three lines were opened in 2024.

Daily ridership increased from 680,000 (2017 average) to 899,000 (2018 average) to 995,000 (2019 average) to 1.935 million (2025 average). Record ridership increased from 1,130,000 (30 April 2017) to 1,548,000 (2 May 2019 record).

As of June 2026, 203.62 km (126.52 mi) of the Suzhou Metro network (63% of the total) operates at GoA4 automation level, the highest proportion in China.

== Lines ==
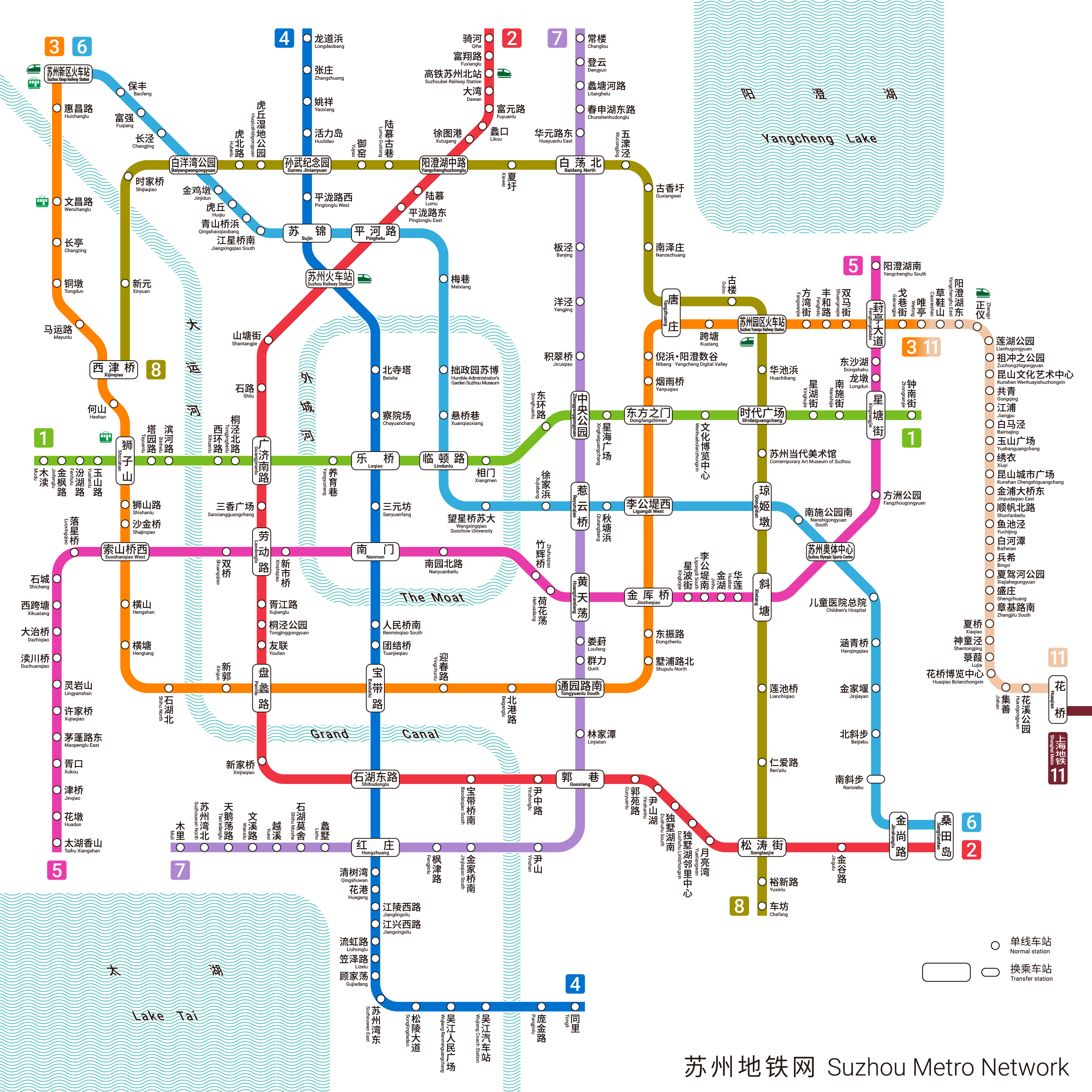
Current system map

Line	Terminals (District)		Commencement	Newest Extension	Length km	Stations
1	Mudu (Wuzhong)	Zhongnan Jie (Gusu)	April 28, 2012	—	25.7	24
2	Qihe (Xiangcheng)	Sangtiandao (Gusu)	December 28, 2013	September 24, 2016	40.4	35
3	Suzhou Xinqu Railway Station (Huqiu)	Weiting (SIP)	December 25, 2019	—	45.2	37
4	Longdaobang (Xiangcheng)	Tongli (Wujiang)	April 15, 2017	—	41.5	31
5	Taihu Xiangshan (Wuzhong)	Yangchenghu South (SIP)	June 29, 2021	—	44.1	34
6	Suzhou Xinqu Railway Station (Huqiu)	Sangtiandao (Gusu)	June 29, 2024	—	36.1	31
7	Changlou (Xiangcheng)	Muli (Wuzhong)	April 15, 2017	December 1, 2024	35.2	29
8	Xijinqiao (Huqiu)	Chefang (Wuzhong)	September 10, 2024	—	35.5	28
11	Weiting (SIP)	Huaqiao (Kunshan)	June 24, 2023	—	41.27	28
Total					345	277

=== Line 1 ===
Line 1 opened on April 28, 2012. It is a line running generally east–west, from Mudu station in western Suzhou to Zhongnan Jie station in Suzhou Industrial Park. It is 25 km (16 mi) long with 24 stations.

Construction on Line 1 began on December 26, 2007, and was completed by 2012. On December 30, 2011, the first 21 cars for Line 1 were delivered.

=== Line 2 ===
Line 2 opened on December 28, 2013. It is a line running generally north–south, from Suzhou North Railway Station in north Xiangcheng District to Baodaiqiao South station close to Precious Belt Bridge located in Wuzhong District.

Construction on Line 2 began on December 25, 2009, and was completed by early 2013. On December 28, 2013, line 2 started service and became a part of Suzhou Metro system. The new 13 stations were opened on September 24, 2016. It is the only metro line in China to use 5-car trains.

=== Line 3 ===
Line 3 started trial operations from December 6 to December 10, 2019 and officially started operation on December 25, 2019. Line 3 got approval to start construction on January 20, 2012. The line is an east–west line, leading from Suzhou Xinqu Railway Station to Weiting. Through service between Line 3 and Line 11 (Jinsheqiao - Huaqiao) has been available since December 23, 2023, and the service from Suzhou Xinqu Railway Station to Huaqiao is available from June 29, 2024.

=== Line 4 ===
Line 4 started trial operations on April 14, 2017. The line starts in the north of Suzhou, west of Line 2. Its main line leads from Longdaobang to Tongli in the south/south east of Suzhou. After reaching Suzhou railway station, it approximately follows Renmin road and Dongwubei road reaching further south until Tongli in Wujiang District. The Southwest Branch of Line 4 is the first phase of the future Line 7. This branch is supposed to follow the same path as the main line until Hongzhuang, then turning into south western direction leading to Youxiang Road.

=== Line 5 ===
Line 5 opened on 29 June 2021 and runs from Taihu Xiangshan to Yangchenghu South.

=== Line 6 ===
Line 6 opened on 29 June 2024. It has 31 stations.

=== Line 7 ===
Line 7 is a north–south line of the Suzhou Metro. As of December 2024, it is 35.2 km in length with 29 stations.

=== Line 8 ===
Line 8 is 35.5 km in length with 28 stations. It opened on September 10, 2024.

=== Line 11 ===
Line 11 (formerly Line S1) is an east west intercity rapid transit line of the Suzhou Metro. It opened on 24 June 2023. It serves Kunshan City and connects to the Shanghai Metro, with the terminal station of Huaqiao also being an interchange station where passengers can interchange to Line 11 of the Shanghai Metro. There is also through service between Line 3 and Line 11 of Suzhou Metro.

== Lines under construction ==
Planned network for 2024

Line	Number of stations	Line Length	Terminals		Scheduled Opening	Construction began
7	4	7.6 km (4.7 mi)	Moyang	Changlou	TBD	Late 2019
2	4	4.69 km (2.91 mi)	Aigehao Lu	Qihe	2026	2022
4	4	7.15 km (4.44 mi)	Guantang Lu	Longdaobang	2026	2022
7	4	7.6 km (4.7 mi)	Chunqiu Lu	Moyang	2026	2022
10	21	90.34 km (56.13 mi)	Jingang	Suzhoubei Railway Station	2028	2023

=== Line 10 ===
Line 10 is a north south express regional rapid transit line of the Suzhou Metro. The first section connecting the northern neighboring cities of Zhangjiagang and Changshu. The line was formerly known as Line S5.

== Fares and tickets ==
The base fare of the Suzhou Metro is 2 yuan (US$0.33) for journeys under 6 km (3.7 mi), then 1 yuan for each 5 km (3.1 mi) between 6–16 km (3.7–9.9 mi), 1 yuan for each 7 km (4.3 mi) between 16 and 30 km (9.9 and 18.6 mi), 1 yuan for 9 km (5.6 mi) more than 30 km (18.6 mi). As of September 24, 2016, the highest fare is 8 yuan (US$1.33).

Users of the Suzhou Tong get a 5% discount for every journey.

== See also ==
- List of Suzhou Metro stations
- List of metro systems
- Urban rail transit in China

=== Other Transport in Suzhou ===
- Suzhou Tram, a tram in Jiangsu Province
- Suzhou BRT, a bus in Jiangsu Province
