= Suzhou Xinqu railway station =

Railway station in Suzhou, Jiangsu, China

Suzhou Xinqu railway station 苏州新区站
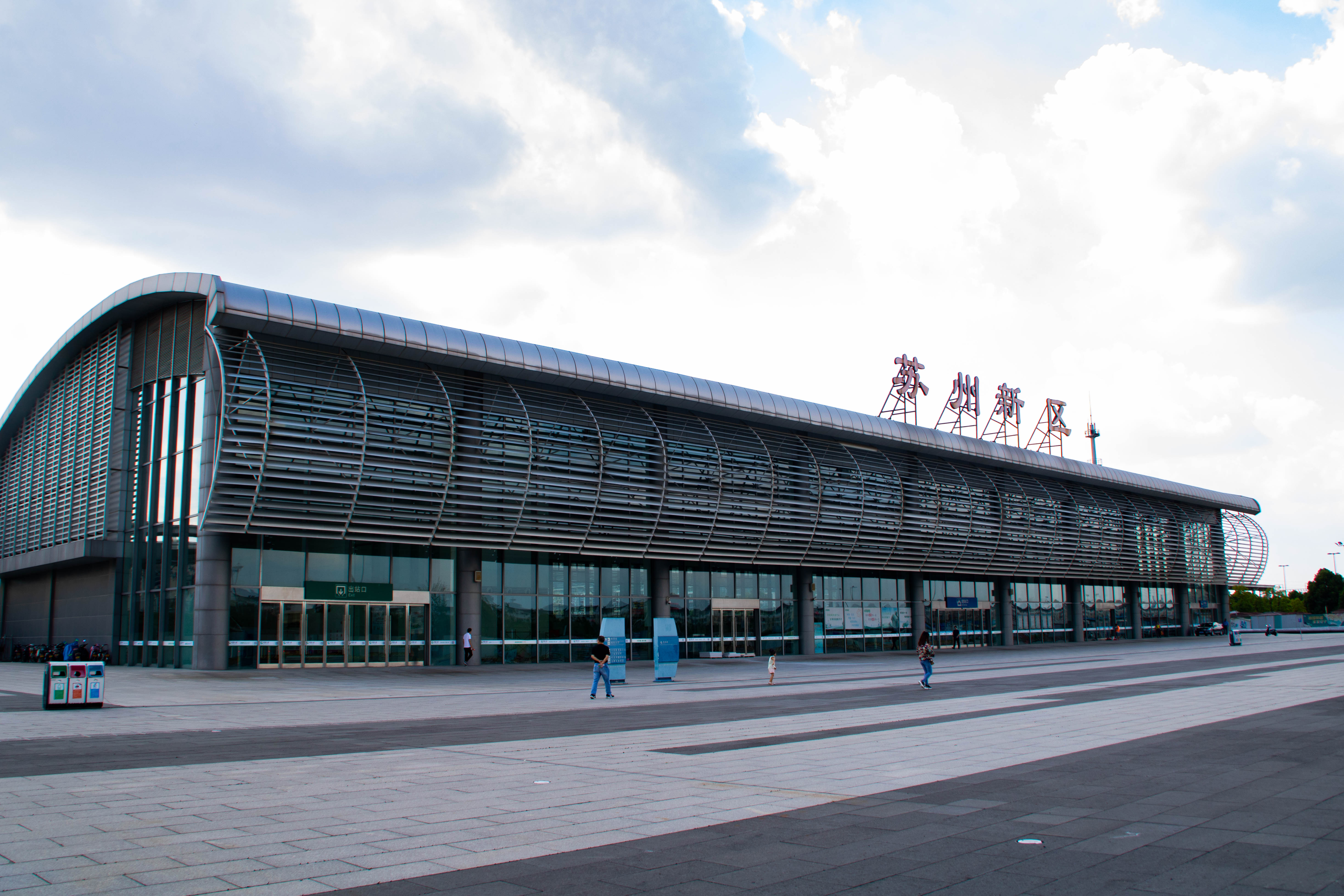
- Station building of Suzhou Xinqu railway station

General information
- Location: Huqiu District, Suzhou, Jiangsu; China
- Coordinates: 31°22′26″N 120°31′14″E
- Operated by: China Railway Shanghai Group
- Line(s): Shanghai–Nanjing intercity railway
- Platforms: 2
- Tracks: 4
- Connections: 3 6 Suzhou Xinqu Railway Station metro station Suzhou Tram Line T2

Other information
- Station code: 66325

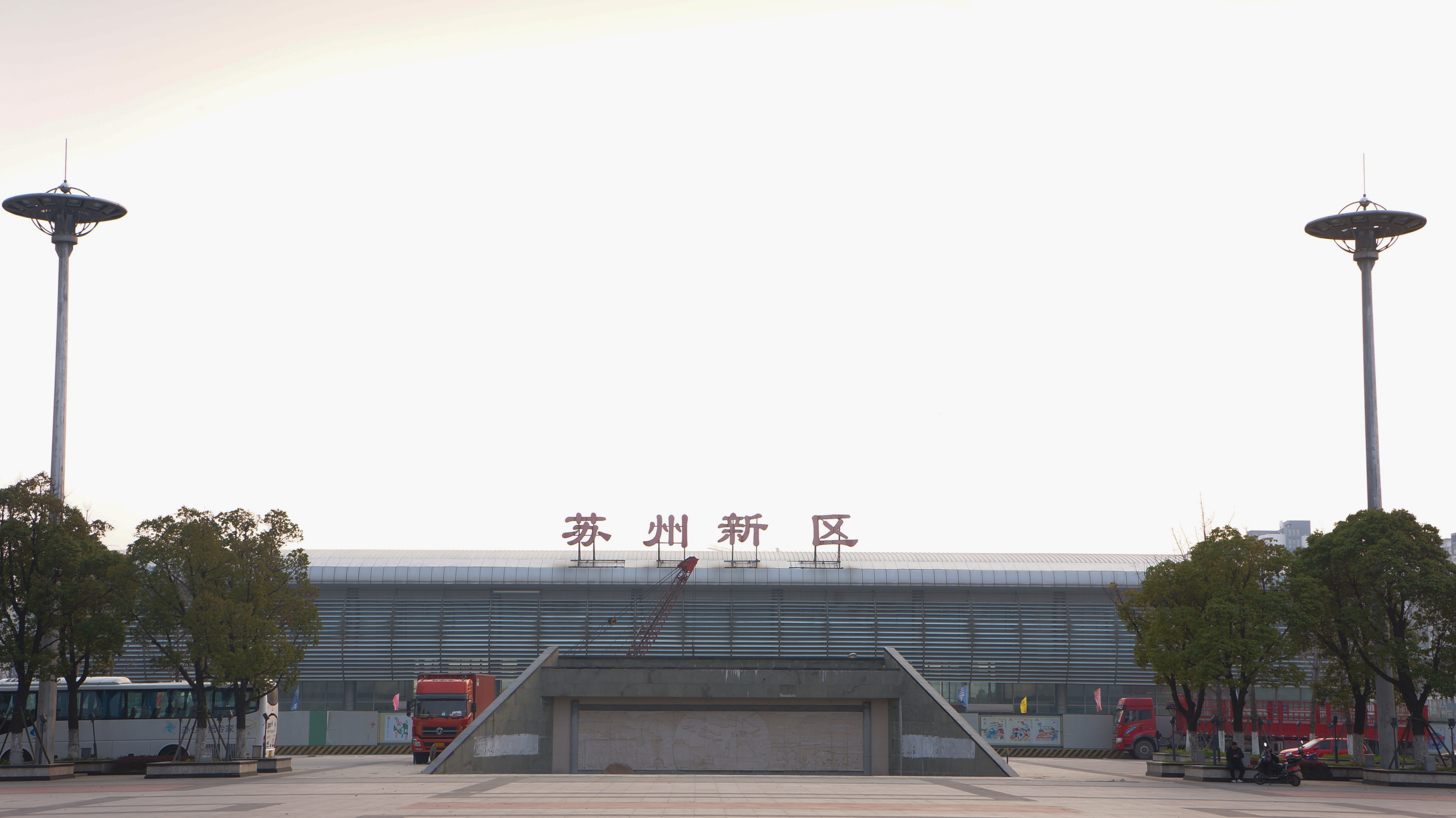
Facade of Suzhou Xinqu Railway Station

Suzhou Xinqu railway station (Chinese: 苏州新区站; pinyin: Sūzhōu Xīnqū zhàn; lit. 'Suzhou New District railway station') is a railway station of Shanghai–Nanjing intercity railway located in Suzhou New District, Suzhou, Jiangsu, People's Republic of China.

== Metro station ==
It is served by Line 3 and Line 6 of the Suzhou Metro, serving as the northern terminus for both lines.

== See also ==
- Suzhou railway station
- Suzhou North railway station

Preceding station	China Railway High-speed	Following station
Suzhou towards Shanghai or Shanghai Hongqiao	Shanghai–Nanjing intercity railway	Wuxi Xinqu towards Nanjing

Preceding station	Suzhou Metro	Following station
Terminus	Line 3	Huichanglu towards Weiting

Preceding station	Suzhou Metro	Following station
Terminus	Line 6	Baofeng towards Sangtiandao
