= Suoshanqiao West station =

Suzhou Metro station

Coordinates: 31°17′7″N 120°34′06″E

Suoshanqiao West 索山桥西
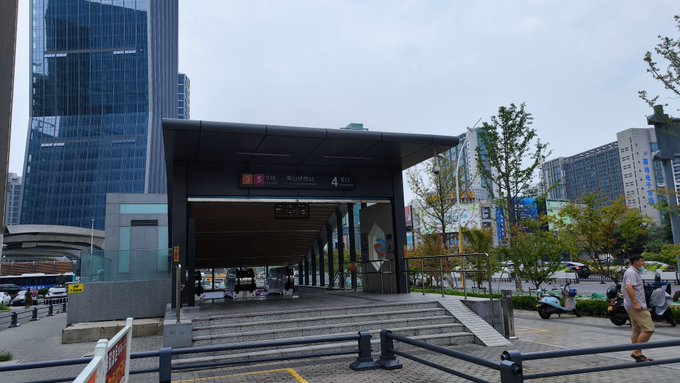

General information
- Location: Huqiu District, Suzhou, Jiangsu; China
- Operated by: Suzhou Rail Transit Co., Ltd
- Line(s): Line 3 Line 5
- Platforms: 4 (2 island platforms)

Construction
- Structure type: Underground

History
- Opened: December 25, 2019

Services
Preceding station	Suzhou Metro	Following station
Shajinqiao towards Suzhou Xinqu Railway Station	Line 3	Hengshan towards Weiting
Luoxingqiao towards Taihu Xiangshan	Line 5	Shuangqiao towards Yangchenghu South

Suoshanqiao West (Chinese: 索山桥西) is a station of Line 3 and Line 5 of the Suzhou Metro. The station is located in Huqiu District, Suzhou. It has been in use since December 25, 2019, when Line 3 first opened to the public, and acts as one of three interchanges between the two lines.
