= Luoxingqiao station =

Suzhou Metro station

Luoxingqiao 落星桥
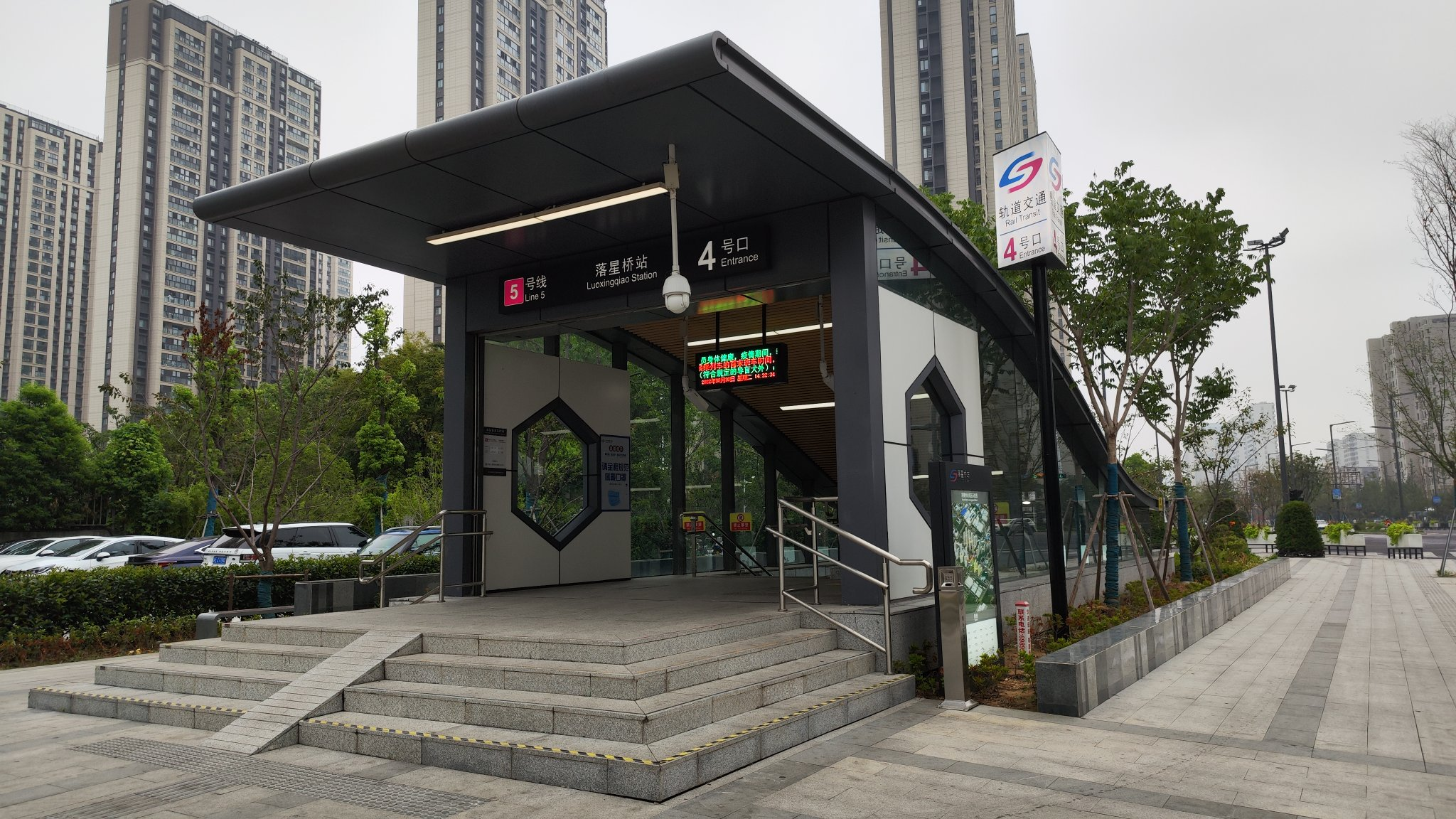

General information
- Location: Huqiu District, Suzhou, Jiangsu; China
- Coordinates: 31.2834°N 120.5557°E
- Operated by: Suzhou Rail Transit Co., Ltd
- Line: Line 5
- Platforms: 2 (1 island platform)

Construction
- Structure type: Underground

History
- Opened: June 29, 2021

Services
Preceding station	Suzhou Metro	Following station
Shicheng towards Taihu Xiangshan	Line 5	Suoshanqiao West towards Yangchenghu South
Location

Luoxingqiao Station (Chinese: 落星桥) is a station on Line 5 of the Suzhou Metro. The station is located in Huqiu District, Jiangsu. It has been in use since June 29, 2021, when Line 5 first opened to the public.
