= Suzhou Olympic Sports Centre station =

Suzhou Metro station

Suzhou Olympic Sports Centre 苏州奥体中心
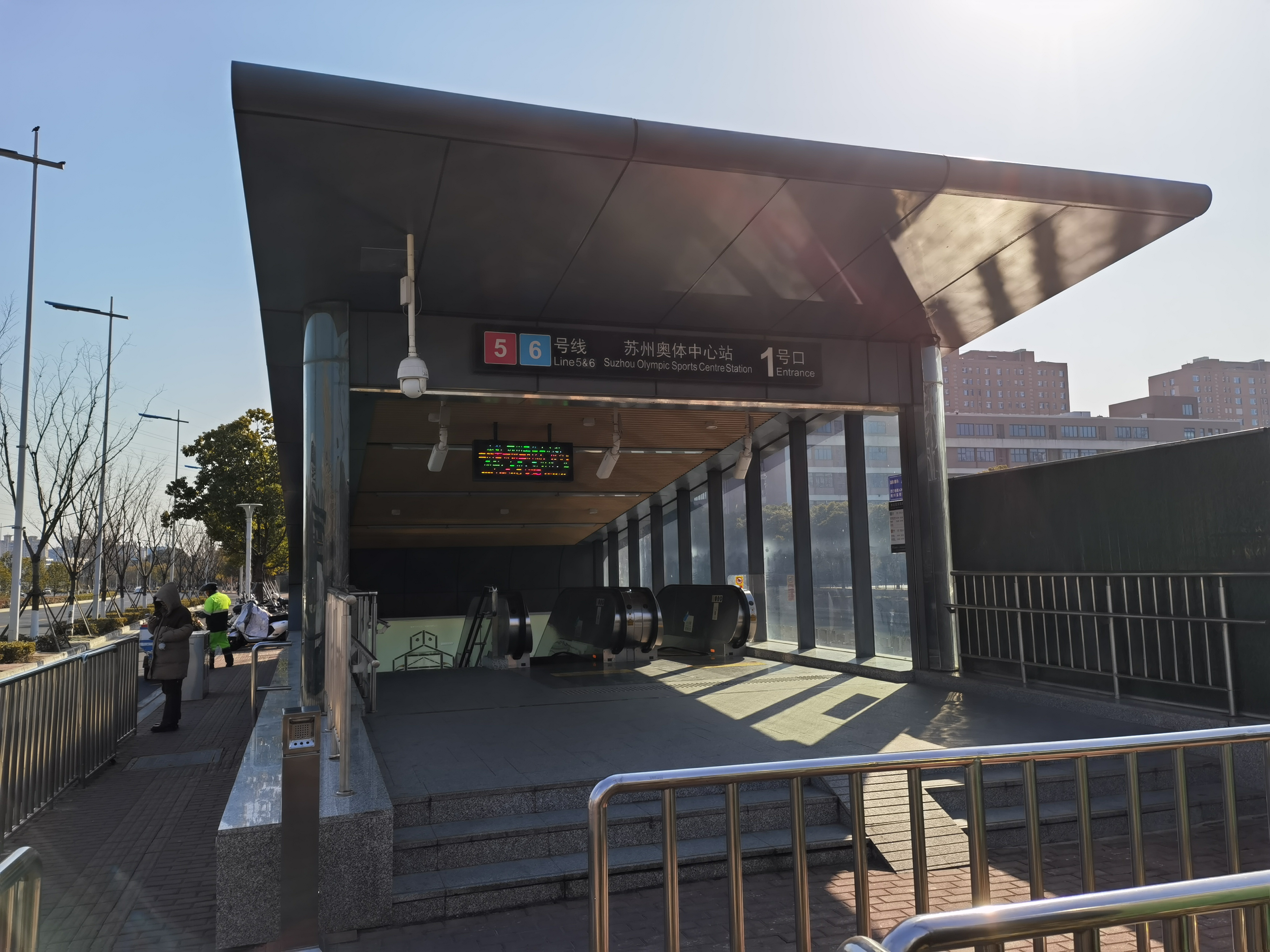

General information
- Location: Suzhou Industrial Park, Suzhou, Jiangsu; China
- Operated by: Suzhou Rail Transit Co., Ltd
- Lines: Line 5 Line 6
- Platforms: 4 (2 island platform)

Construction
- Structure type: Underground

History
- Opened: June 29, 2021

Services
Preceding station	Suzhou Metro	Following station
Xietang towards Taihu Xiangshan	Line 5	Fangzhougongyuan towards Yangchenghu South
Nanshigongyuan South towards Suzhou Xinqu Railway Station	Line 6	Children's Hospital towards Sangtiandao
Location

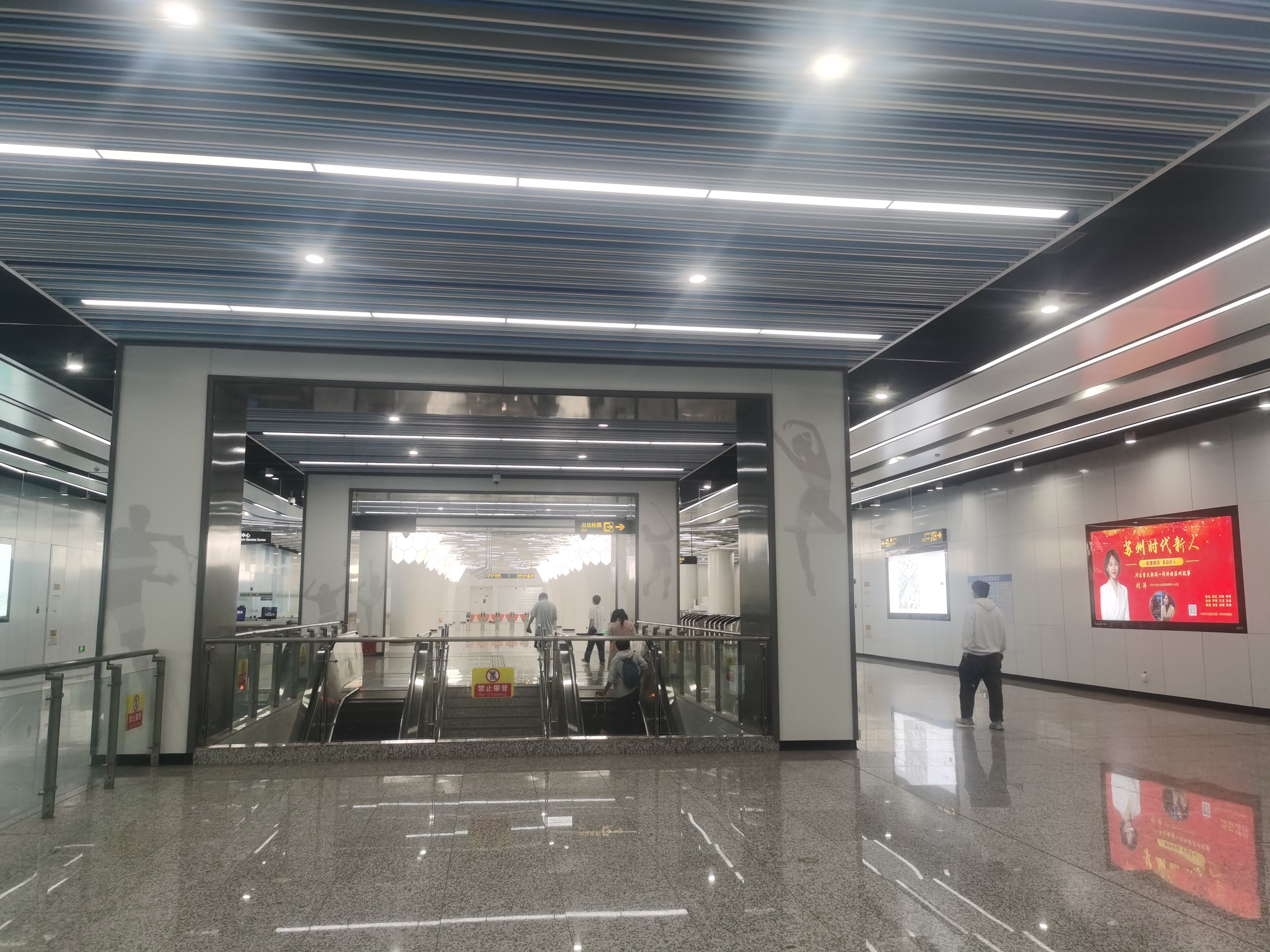
Station hall

Suzhou Olympic Sports Centre Station (Chinese: 苏州奥体中心) is a station on Line 5 & Line 6 of the Suzhou Metro. The station is located in Suzhou Industrial Park, Jiangsu and serves the Suzhou Olympic Sports Centre. It has been in use since June 29, 2021, when Line 5 first opened to the public.
