= Xietang station =

Suzhou Metro station

Xietang 斜塘
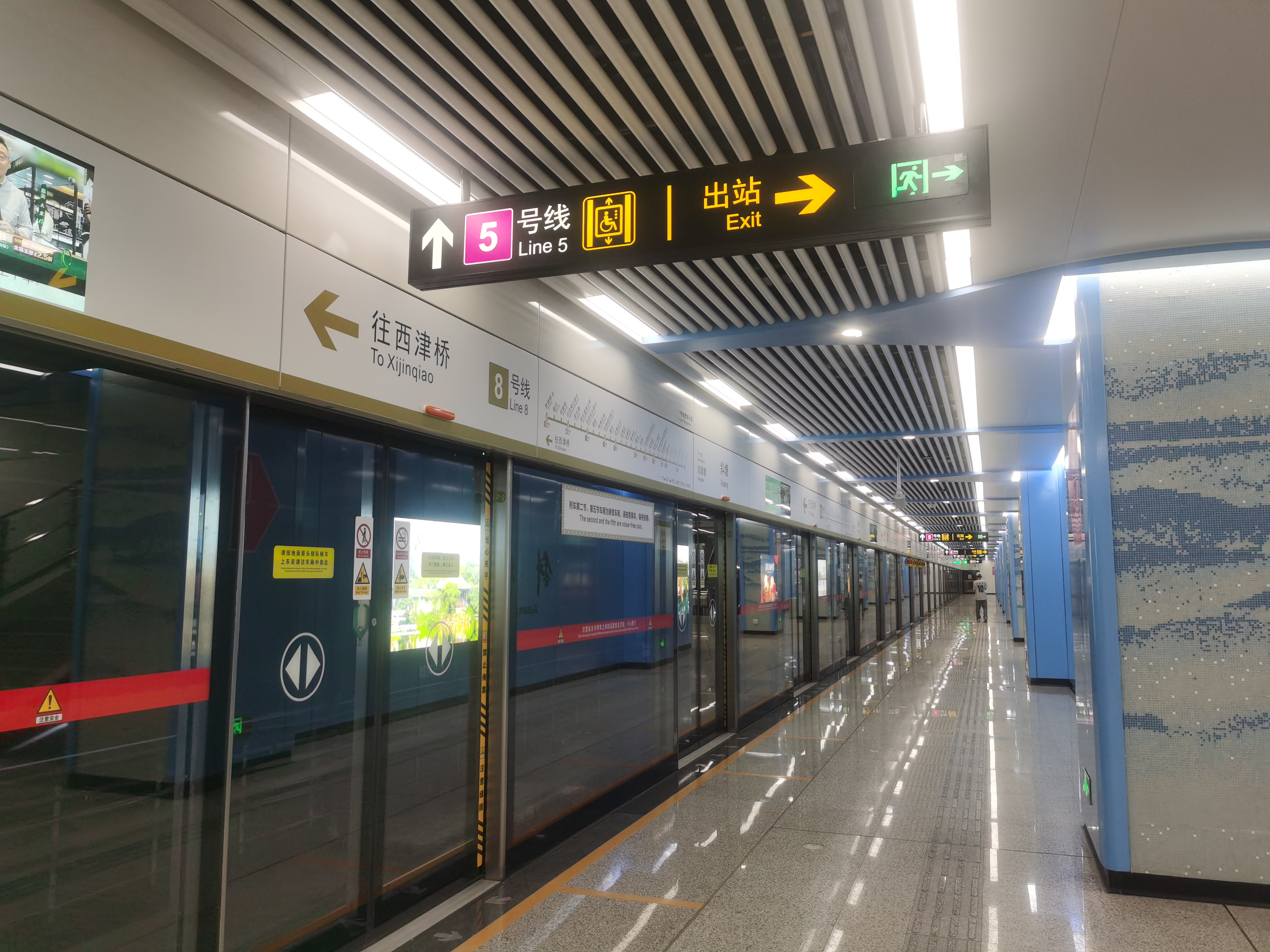
- Line 8 platform

General information
- Location: Suzhou Industrial Park, Suzhou, Jiangsu; China
- Coordinates: 31.30133°N 120.72982°E
- Operated by: Suzhou Rail Transit Co., Ltd
- Lines: Line 5 Line 8
- Platforms: 4 (2 island platform)

Construction
- Structure type: Underground

History
- Opened: June 29, 2021

Services
Preceding station	Suzhou Metro	Following station
Hualian towards Taihu Xiangshan	Line 5	Suzhou Olympic Sports Centre towards Yangchenghu South
Qiongjidun towards Xijinqiao	Line 8	Lianchiqiao towards Chefang
Location

Xietang Station (Chinese: 斜塘) is a station of Line 5 and Line 8 of the Suzhou Metro. The station is located in Suzhou Industrial Park, Jiangsu. It has been in use since June 29, 2021, when Line 5 first opened to the public.
