= Longdun station =

Suzhou Metro station

Longdun 龙墩

General information
- Location: Suzhou Industrial Park, Suzhou, Jiangsu; China
- Coordinates: 31.3374°N 120.7436°E
- Operated by: Suzhou Rail Transit Co., Ltd
- Line: Line 5
- Platforms: 2 (1 island platform)

Construction
- Structure type: Underground

History
- Opened: June 29, 2021

Services
Preceding station	Suzhou Metro	Following station
Xingtangjie towards Taihu Xiangshan	Line 5	Dongshahu towards Yangchenghu South
Location

Longdun Station (Chinese: 龙墩) is a station on Line 5 of the Suzhou Metro. The station is located in Suzhou Industrial Park, Jiangsu. It has been in use since June 29, 2021, when Line 5 first opened to the public.
