= Huangtiandang station =

Suzhou Metro station

Huangtiandang 黄天荡
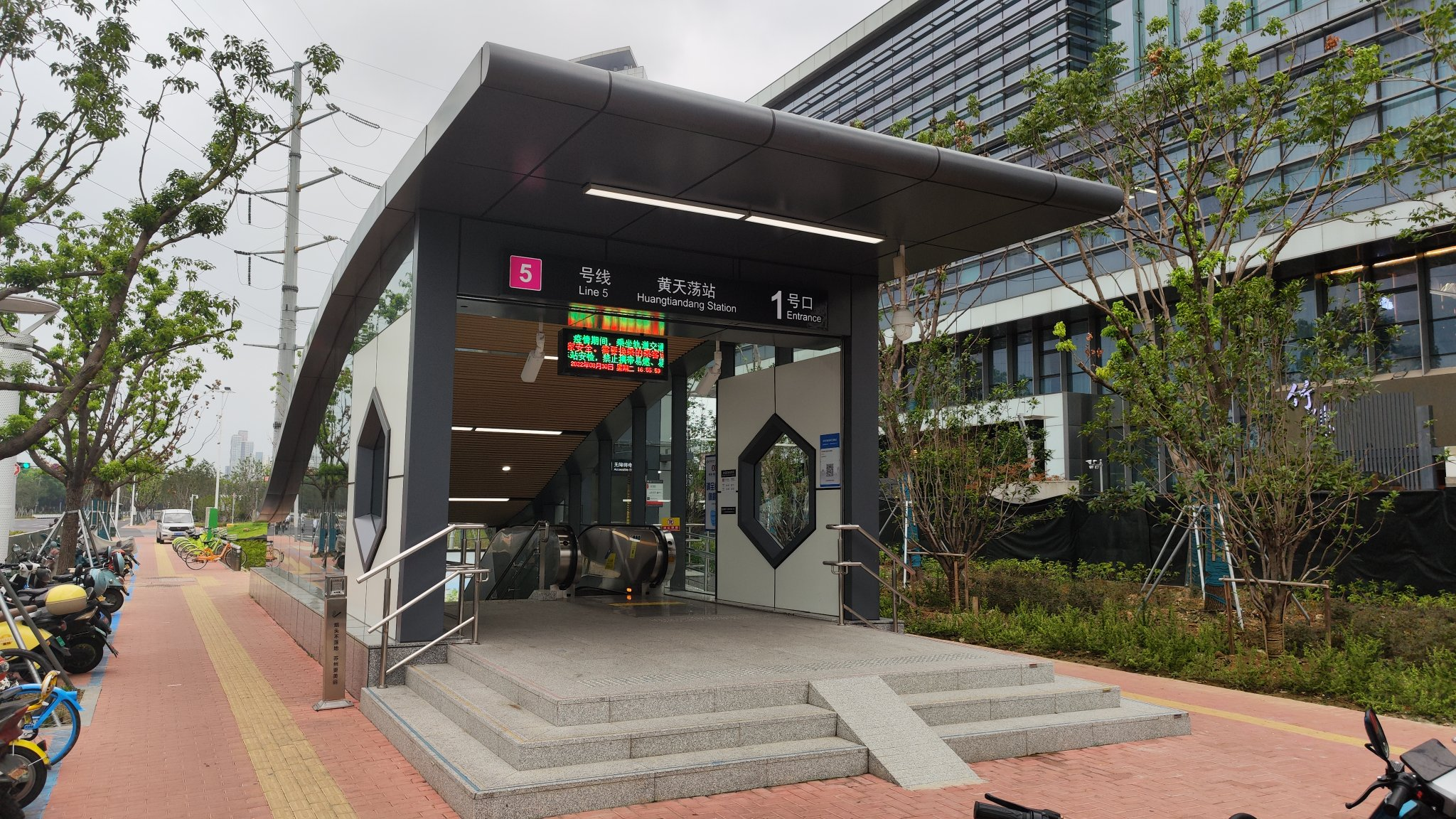

General information
- Location: Suzhou Industrial Park, Suzhou, Jiangsu; China
- Operated by: Suzhou Rail Transit Co., Ltd
- Lines: Line 5 Line 7
- Platforms: 2 (1 island platform)

Construction
- Structure type: Underground

History
- Opened: June 29, 2021

Services
Preceding station	Suzhou Metro	Following station
Hehuadang towards Taihu Xiangshan	Line 5	Jinsheqiao towards Yangchenghu South
Reyunqiao towards Changlou	Line 7	Loufeng towards Muli
Location

Huangtiandang Station (Chinese: 黄天荡) is a station on Line 5 and Line 7 of the Suzhou Metro. The station is located in Suzhou Industrial Park, Jiangsu. It has been in use since June 29, 2021, when Line 5 first opened to the public. Upon completion of Line 7, the station became an interchange between the two lines.
