= Shicheng station (Suzhou Metro) =

Suzhou Metro station

Shicheng 石城
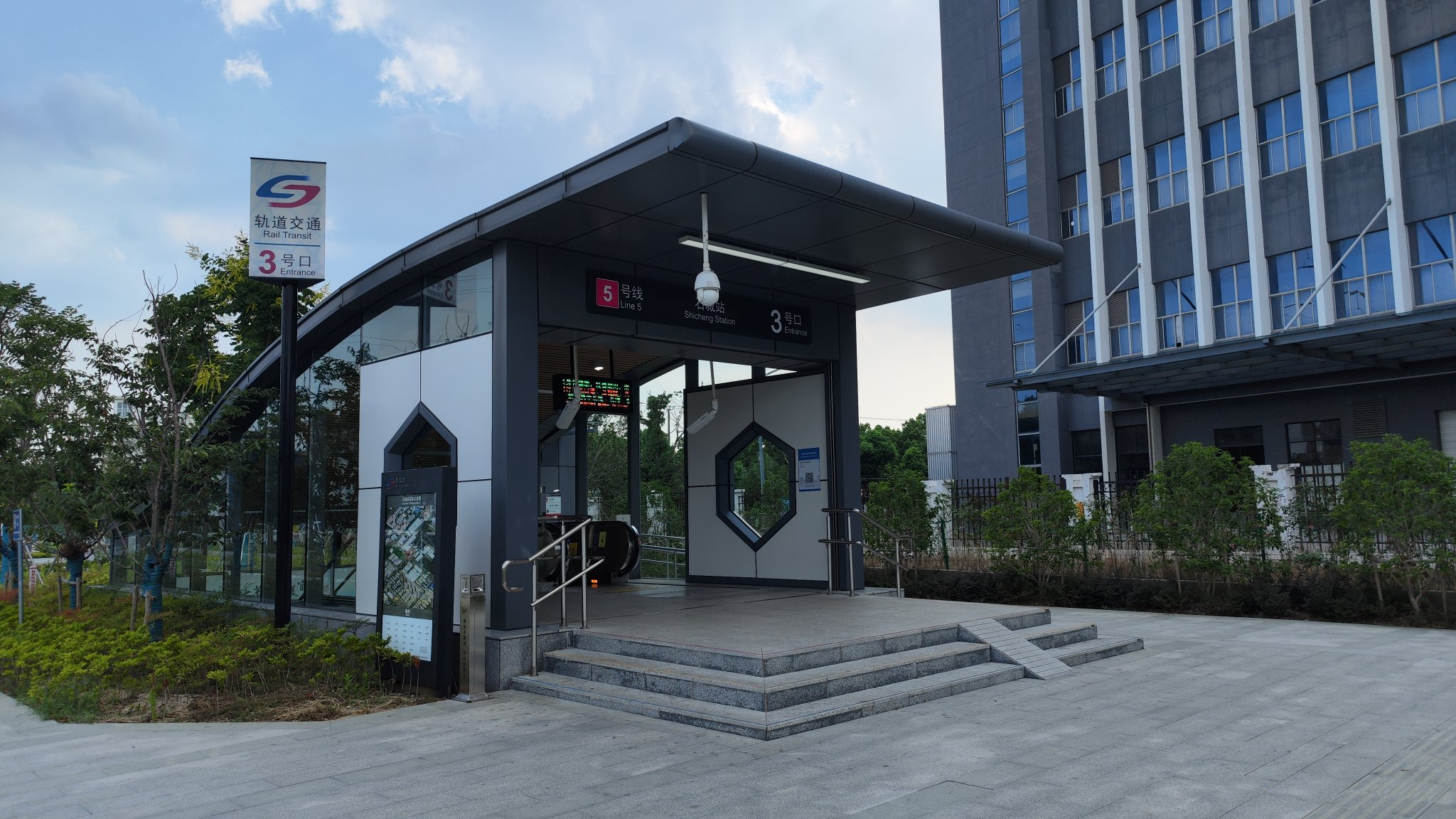

General information
- Location: Huqiu District, Suzhou, Jiangsu; China
- Operated by: Suzhou Rail Transit Co., Ltd
- Line: Line 5
- Platforms: 2 (1 island platform)

Construction
- Structure type: Underground

History
- Opened: June 29, 2021

Services
Preceding station	Suzhou Metro	Following station
Xikuatang towards Taihu Xiangshan	Line 5	Luoxingqiao towards Yangchenghu South
Location

Shicheng Station (Chinese: 石城) is a station on Line 5 of the Suzhou Metro. The station is located in Huqiu District, Suzhou, Jiangsu. It has been in use since June 29, 2021, when Line 5 first opened to the public.
