= Hualian station =

Suzhou Metro station

Hualian 华莲
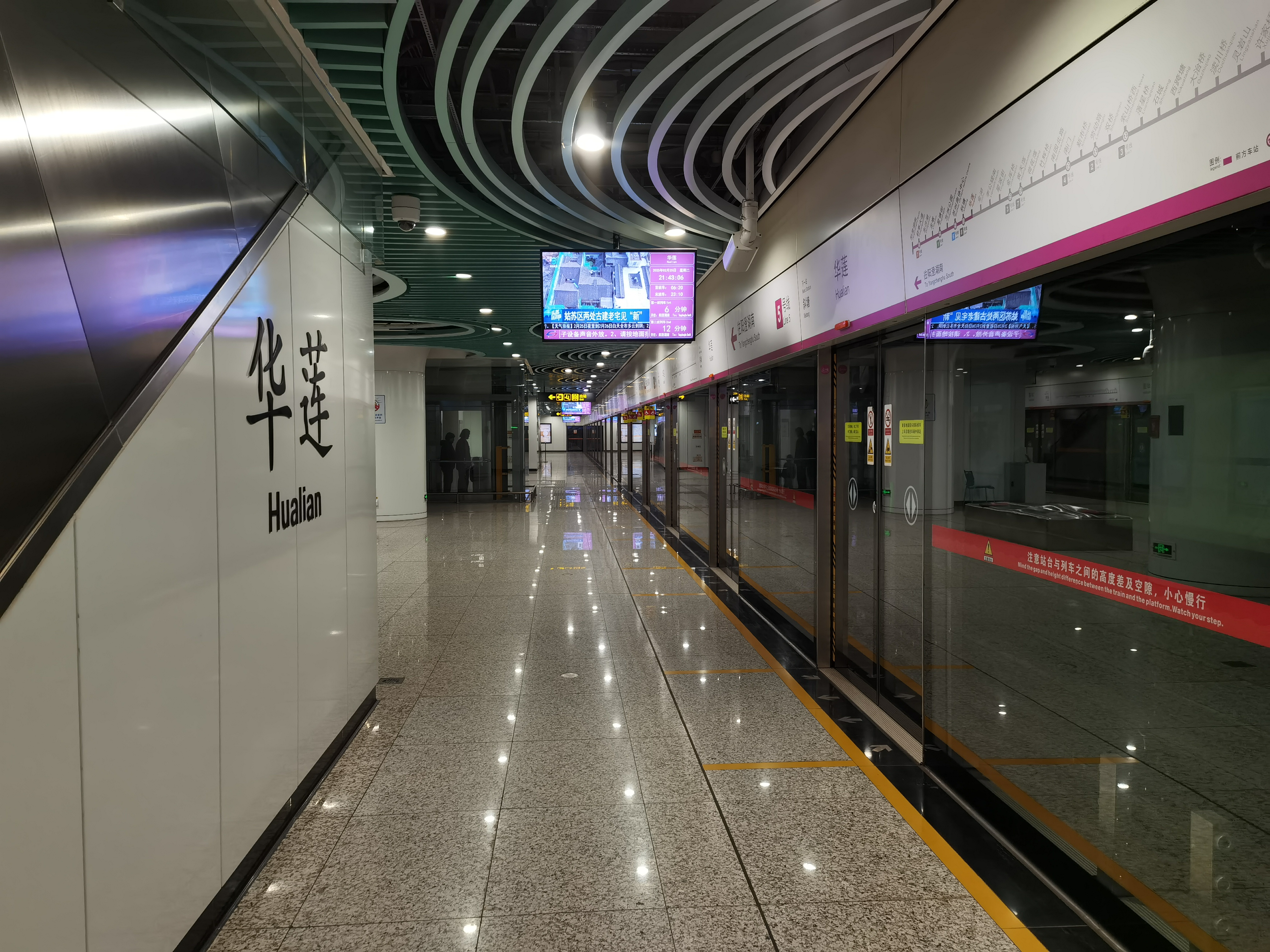
- Platform (to Yangchenghu South)

General information
- Location: Suzhou Industrial Park, Suzhou, Jiangsu; China
- Coordinates: 31.3011°N 120.7184°E
- Operated by: Suzhou Rail Transit Co., Ltd
- Line: Line 5
- Platforms: 2 (1 island platform)

Construction
- Structure type: Underground

History
- Opened: June 29, 2021

Services
Preceding station	Suzhou Metro	Following station
Jinhu towards Taihu Xiangshan	Line 5	Xietang towards Yangchenghu South
Location

Hualian Station (Chinese: 华莲) is a station on Line 5 of the Suzhou Metro in China. The station is located in Suzhou Industrial Park, Jiangsu. It has been in use since June 29, 2021, when Line 5 first opened to the public.
