= Laodonglu station (Suzhou Metro) =

Metro station in Suzhou, China

Laodonglu 劳动路
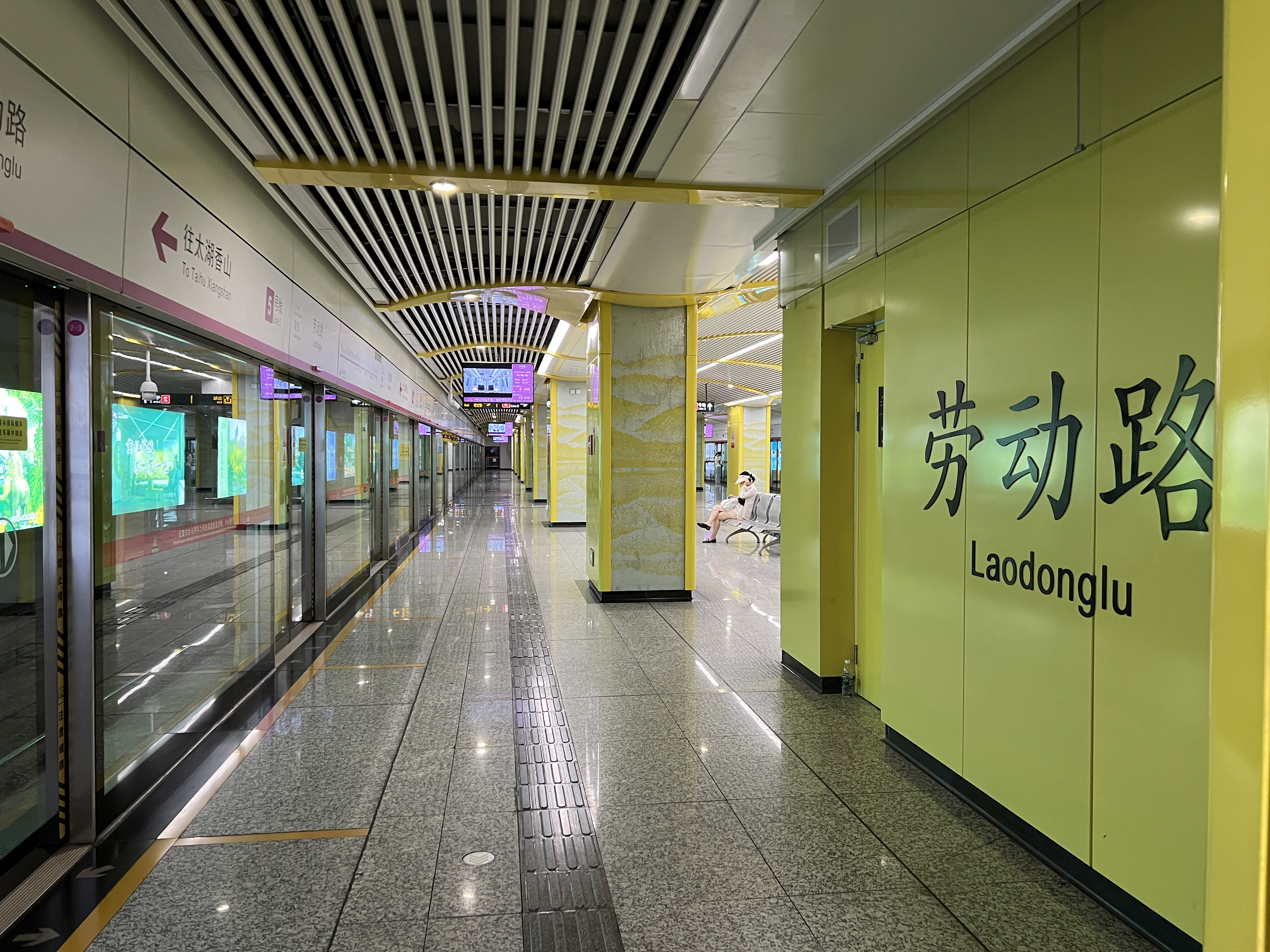
- Line 5 platform

General information
- Location: Laodong Road (Line 2); Xutao Road (Line 5); Gusu District, Suzhou, Jiangsu; China
- Coordinates: 31°17′37″N 120°35′36″E
- Operated by: Suzhou Rail Transit Co., Ltd
- Lines: Line 2 Line 5
- Platforms: 4 (2 island platforms)

Construction
- Structure type: Underground
- Accessible: Yes

History
- Opened: December 28, 2013
- Previous names: Laodong Lu

Services
Preceding station	Suzhou Metro	Following station
Sanxiang Square towards Qihe	Line 2	Xujiang Lu towards Sangtiandao
Shuangqiao towards Taihu Xiangshan	Line 5	Xinshiqiao towards Yangchenghu South
Location

Laodonglu Station, formerly Laodong Lu Station (simplified Chinese: 劳动路站; traditional Chinese: 勞動路站) is a station of Line 2 and Line 5 of the Suzhou Metro. The station is located in Gusu District of Suzhou. It started service on December 28, 2013, when Line 2 first opened. There is an inclined elevator in the transfer passage between two concourses, allowing passengers with disability to transfer.
