= Jinsheqiao station =

Suzhou Metro station

Coordinates: 31°17′56″N 120°40′27″E

Jinsheqiao 金厍桥
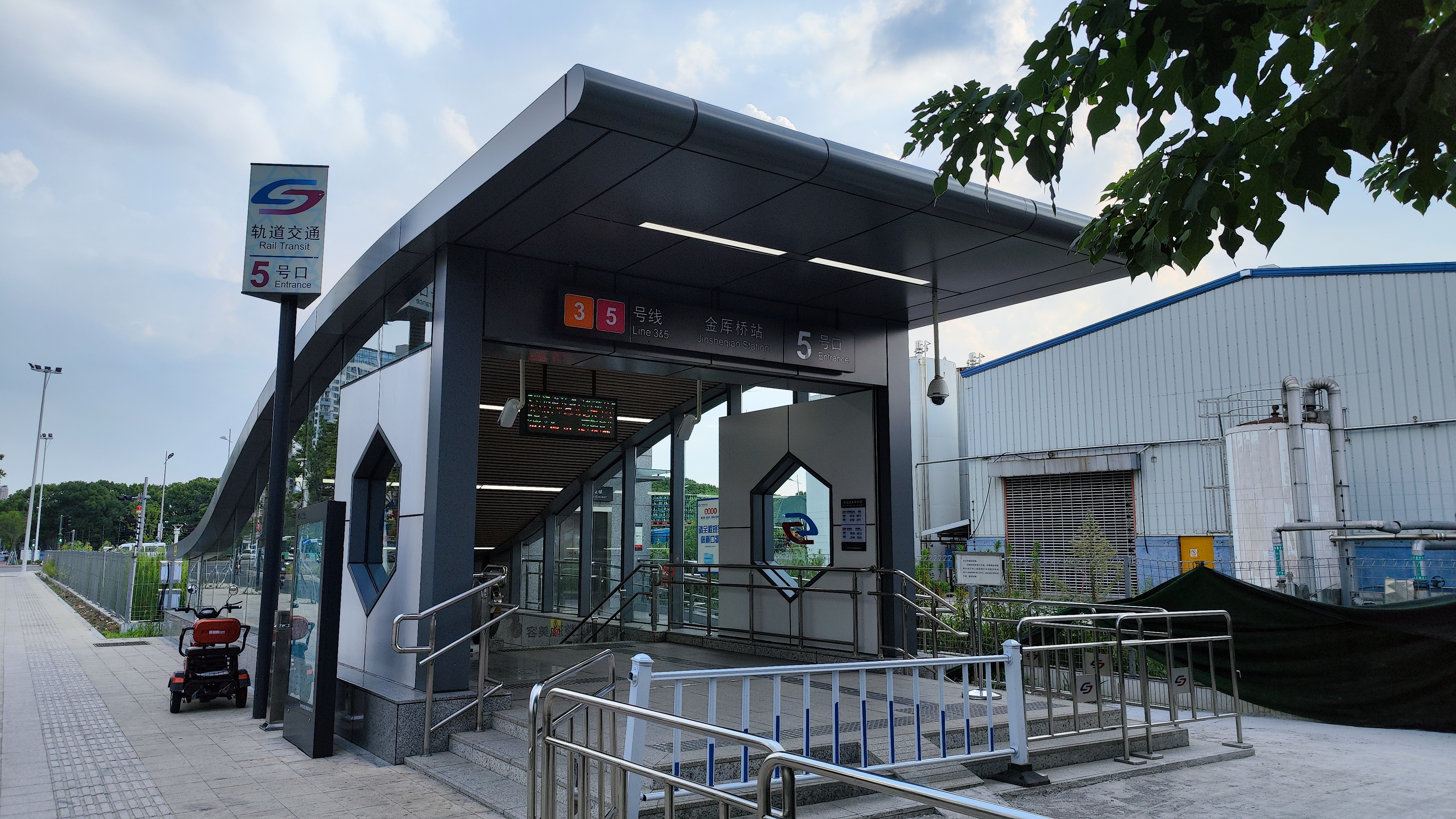

General information
- Location: Suzhou Industrial Park, Suzhou, Jiangsu; China
- Operated by: Suzhou Rail Transit Co., Ltd
- Lines: Line 3 Line 5
- Platforms: 4 (2 island platforms)

Construction
- Structure type: Underground

History
- Opened: December 25, 2019

Services
Preceding station	Suzhou Metro	Following station
Dongzhenlu towards Suzhou Xinqu Railway Station	Line 3	Ligongdi West towards Weiting
Huangtiandang towards Taihu Xiangshan	Line 5	Xingbojie towards Yangchenghu South
Location

Jinsheqiao Station (Chinese: 金厍桥) is a station of Line 3 and Line 5 of the Suzhou Metro. The station is located in Suzhou Industrial Park, Jiangsu. It has been in use since December 25, 2019, when Line 3 first opened to the public, and acts as one of 3 interchanges between the two lines.
