= Suzhou Olympic Sports Centre =

Sports venue in Suzhou, China

Coordinates: 31°18′24.3″N 120°44′43.1″E

Suzhou Olympic Sports Centre Stadium
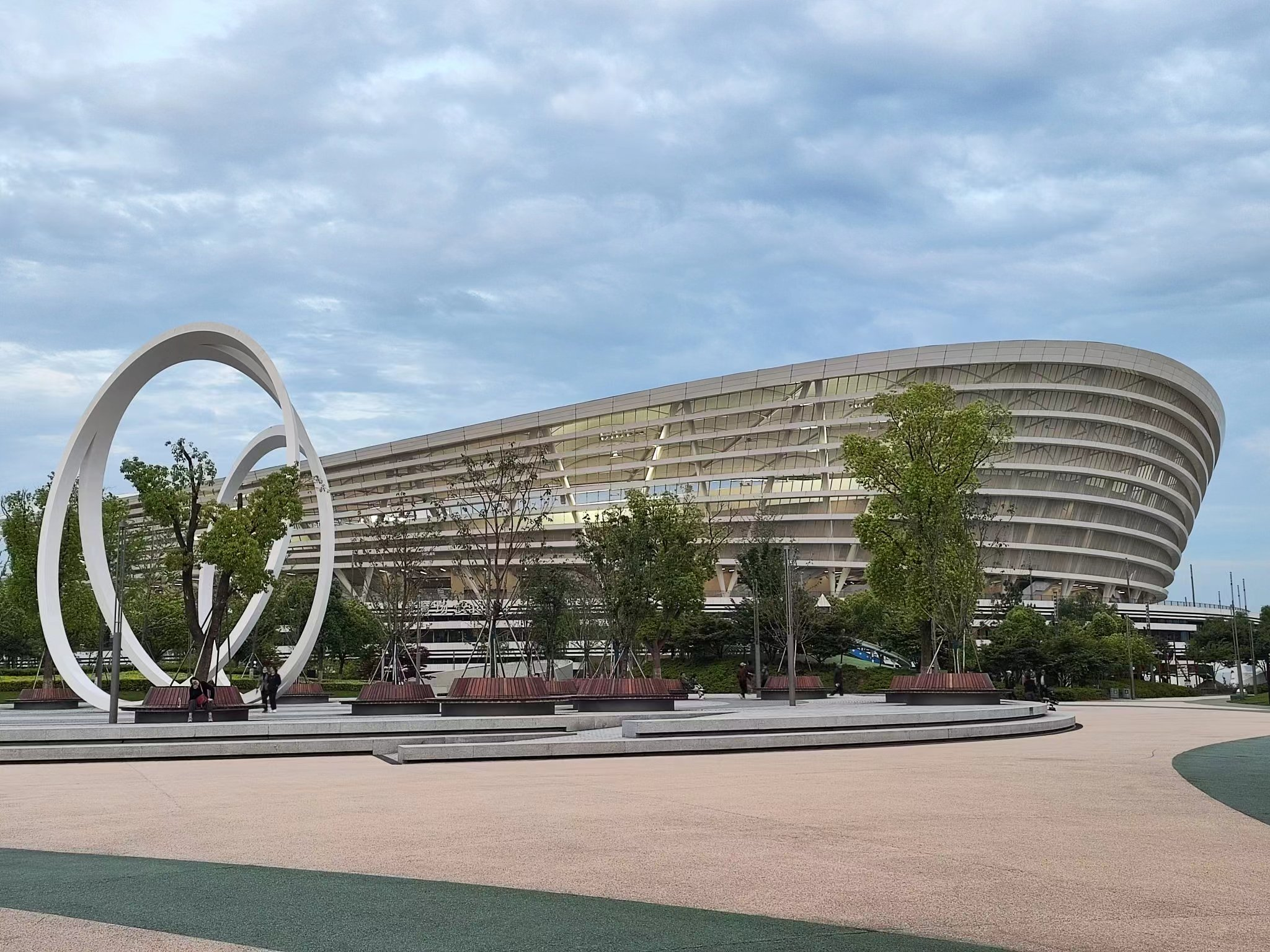
- Suzhou Olympic Sports Centre in 2023
- Interactive map of Suzhou Olympic Sports Centre Stadium
- Location: Suzhou, Jiangsu, China
- Owner: City of Suzhou
- Operator: Suzhou Olympic Sports Center Management Co. Ltd
- Capacity: 40,933
- Surface: Grass
- Public transit: Suzhou Metro: Line 5 & Line 6 at Suzhou Olympic Sports Centre

Construction
- Groundbreaking: 29 September 2013
- Opened: 13 October 2018
- Architect: Gerkan, Marg and Partners

Tenant
- Suzhou Dongwu

The Suzhou Olympic Sports Centre (Chinese: 苏州奥林匹克体育中心) is a sports complex located in the Suzhou Industrial Park, Jiangsu, China. The complex is composed of multiple buildings and facilities, including a stadium, a gymnasium, a natatorium and a business center. It was officially opened in January 2019.

== Construction ==
Initially called the Suzhou Industrial Park Sports Center, the construction site east of Jinji Lake was located within the Suzhou Industrial Park. The plan was for a 60 hectare facility to host a stadium, an indoor arena, an aquatics center and a commercial hub. The main stadium's architectural design is inspired from the traditional Chinese lantern design. The main indoor arena was planned to have a seating capacity of 13,000. The sports center was scheduled to be opened to the public in 2018. In February 2018, it was renamed as Suzhou Olympic Sports Center and open to public on June 30.
