= Fengtingdadao station =

Suzhou Metro station

Coordinates: 31°21′49″N 120°45′47″E

Fengtingdadao 葑亭大道
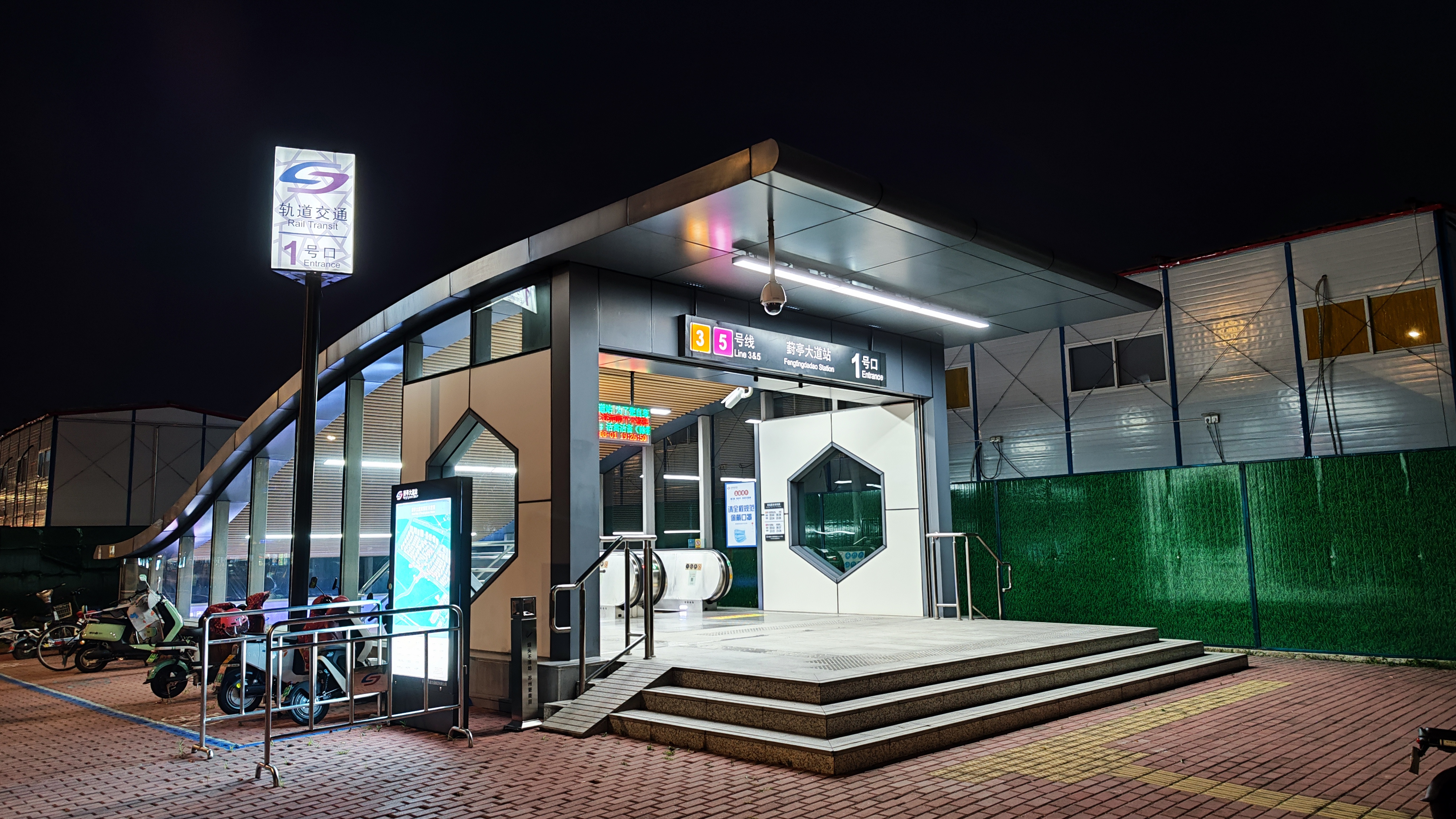

General information
- Location: Suzhou Industrial Park, Suzhou, Jiangsu; China
- Operated by: Suzhou Rail Transit Co., Ltd
- Lines: Line 3 Line 5
- Platforms: 4 (1 island platform, 2 side platforms)

Construction
- Structure type: Underground

History
- Opened: December 25, 2019

Services
Preceding station	Suzhou Metro	Following station
Shuangmajie towards Suzhou Xinqu Railway Station	Line 3	Gexiangjie towards Weiting
Dongshahu towards Taihu Xiangshan	Line 5	Yangchenghu South Terminus

Fengtingdadao Station (Chinese: 葑亭大道) is a station of Line 3 and Line 5 of the Suzhou Metro. The station is located in Suzhou Industrial Park, Jiangsu. It has been in use since December 25, 2019, when Line 3 first opened to the public.

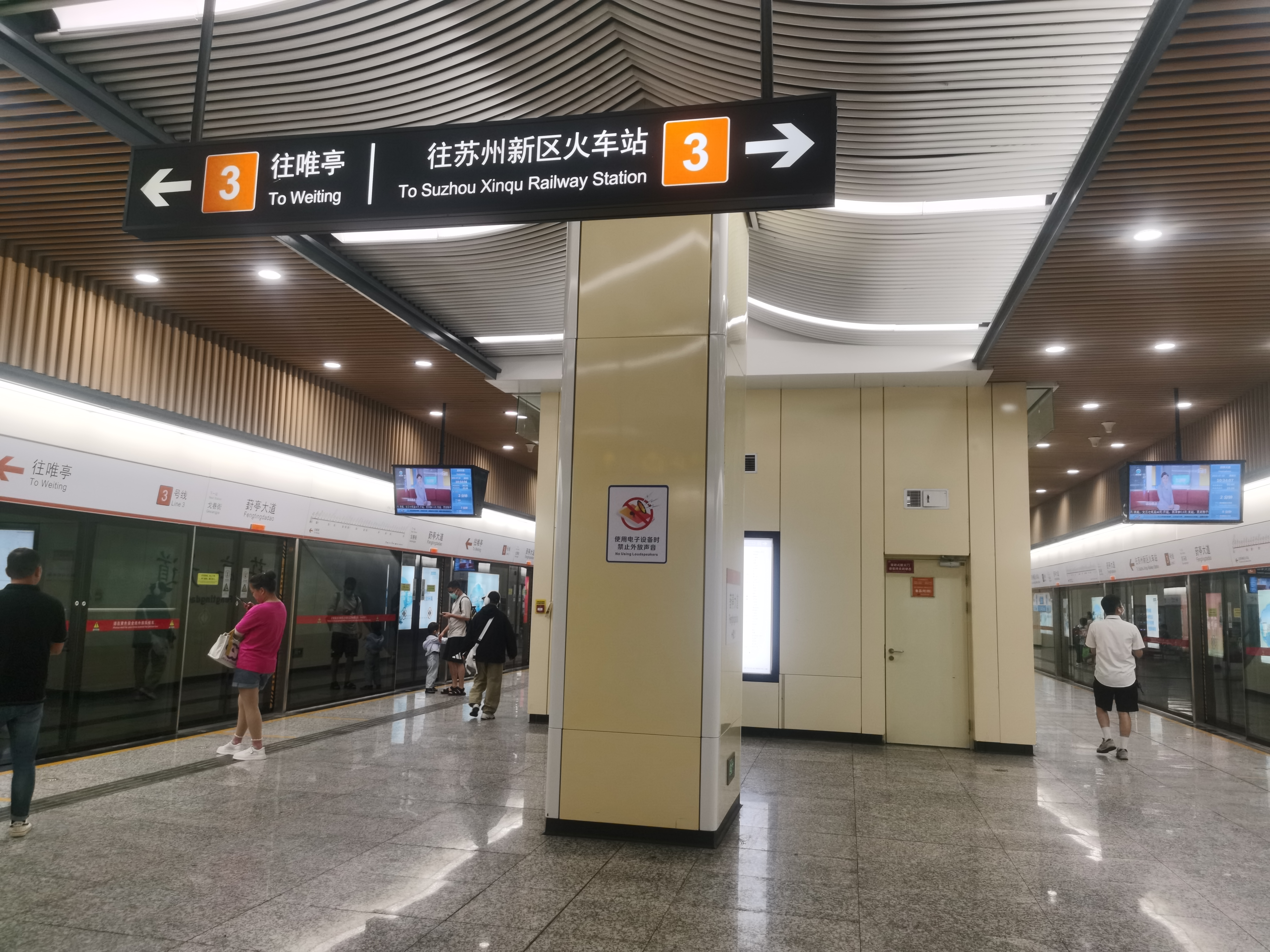
Line 3 Platform

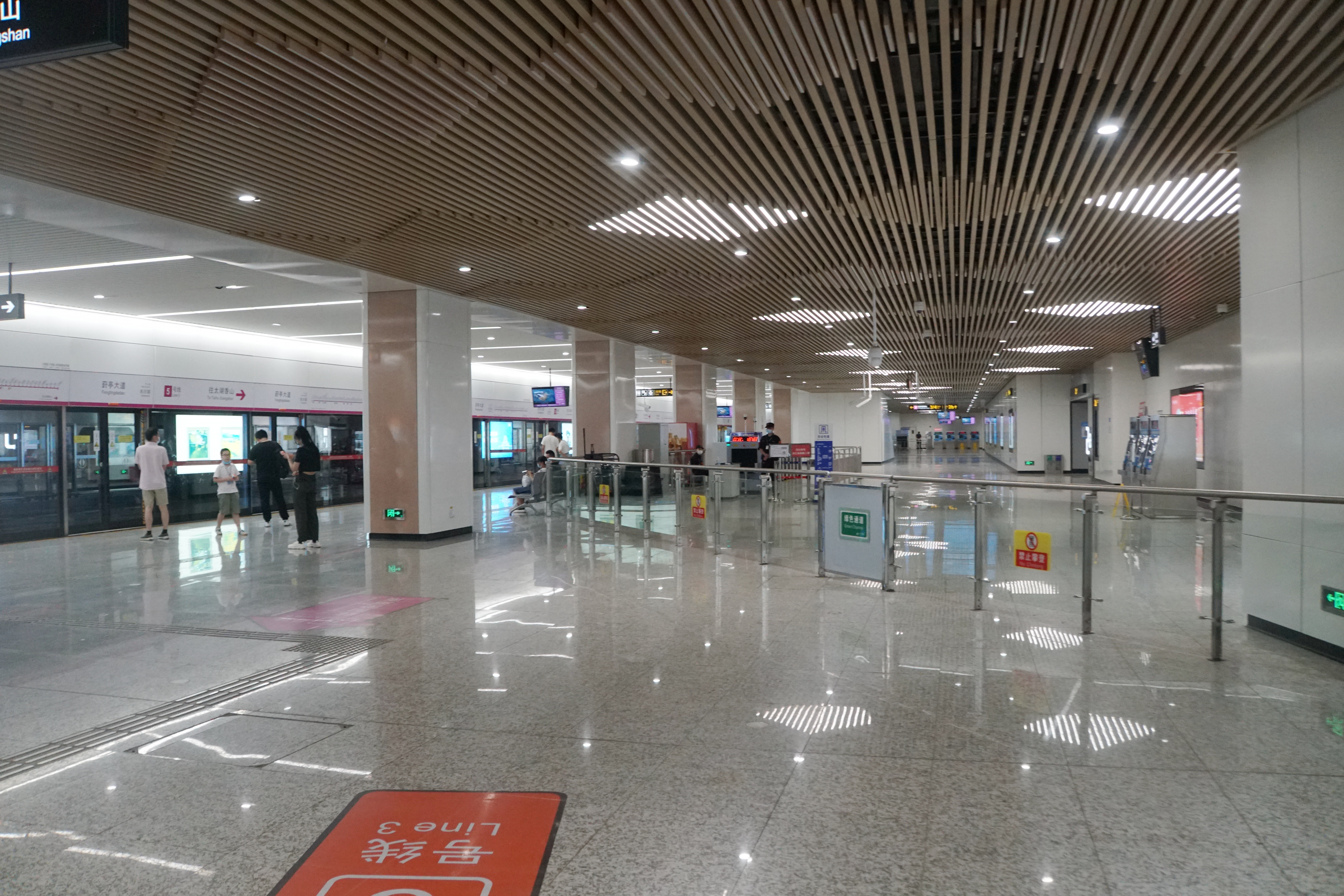
Line 5 Platform
