= Shicheng =

Shicheng may refer to:

- Shicheng, Beijing, in Miyun District, Beijing, China
- Shicheng County, in Ganzhou, Jiangxi Province, China
- Shicheng (Zhejiang), in Chun'an County, Hangzhou, Zhejiang Province, China
- Singapore, Chinese translation of the nickname Lion City

== See also ==
- Shicheng station (disambiguation)
