= Ligongdi West station =

Suzhou Metro station

Coordinates: 31°18′31″N 120°40′31″E

Ligongdi West 李公堤西
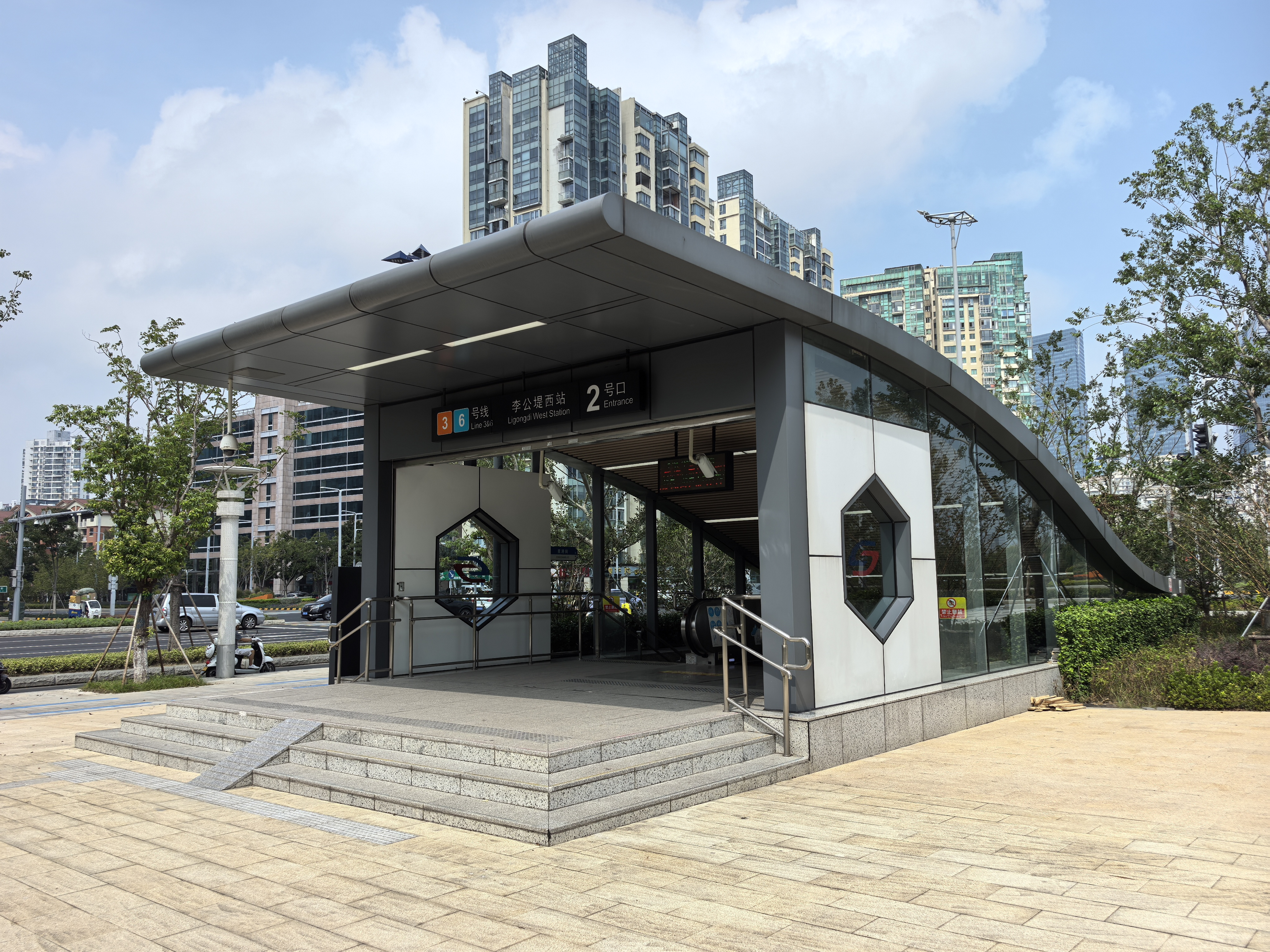

General information
- Location: Suzhou Industrial Park, Suzhou, Jiangsu; China
- Operated by: Suzhou Rail Transit Co., Ltd
- Lines: Line 3 Line 6
- Platforms: 4 (2 island platforms)

Construction
- Structure type: Underground

History
- Opened: December 25, 2019

Services
Preceding station	Suzhou Metro	Following station
Jinsheqiao towards Suzhou Xinqu Railway Station	Line 3	Dongfangzhimen towards Weiting
Qiutangbang towards Suzhou Xinqu Railway Station	Line 6	Qiongjidun towards Sangtiandao
Location

Ligongdi West Station (Chinese: 李公堤西) is a station on Line 3 and Line 6 of the Suzhou Metro. The station is located in Suzhou Industrial Park, Jiangsu. It has been in use since December 25, 2019, when Line 3 first opened to the public.

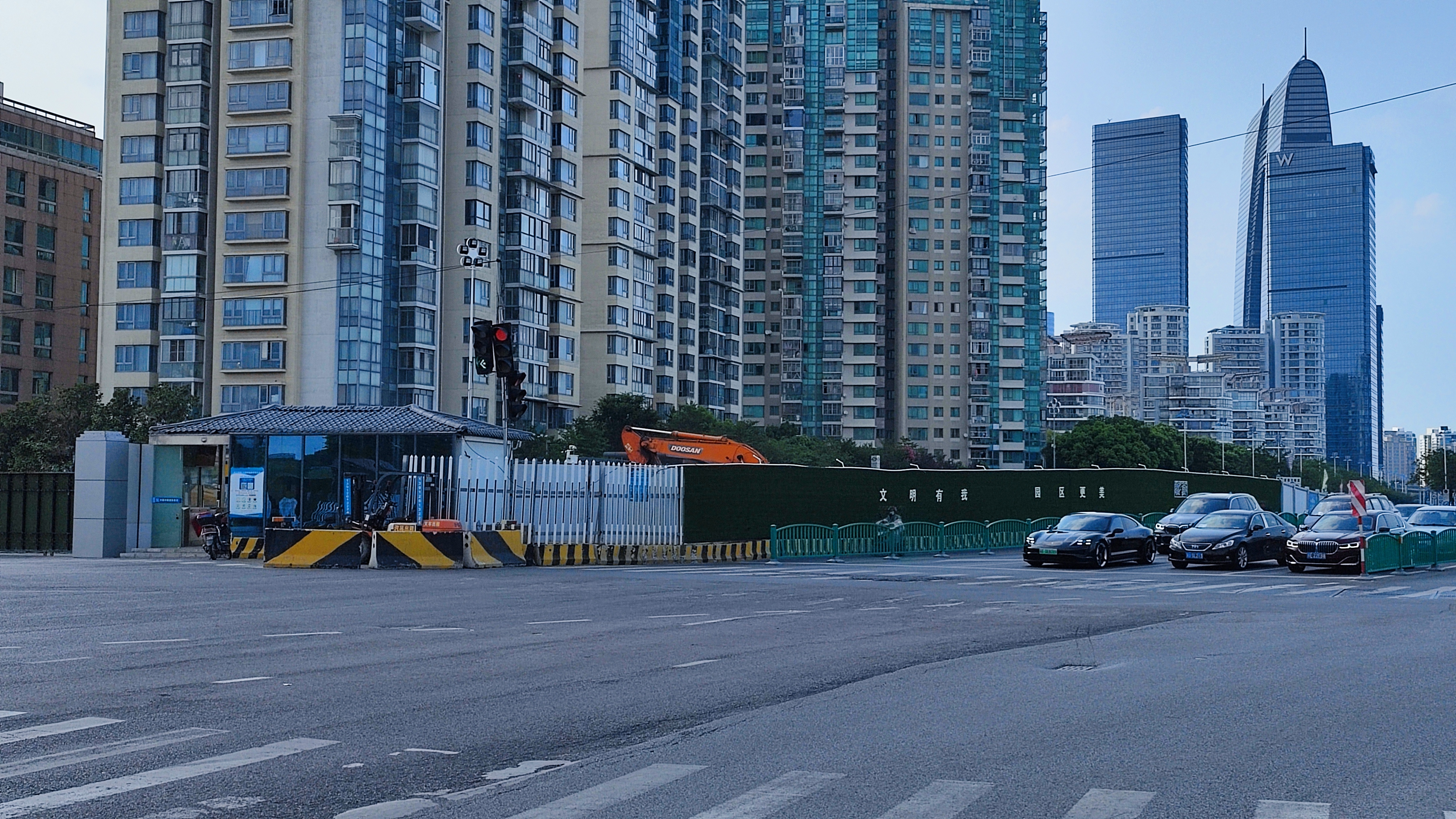
Line 6 under construction at Ligongdi West station.
