= Line 6 (Suzhou Metro) =

Metro line in Suzhou, Jiangsu, China

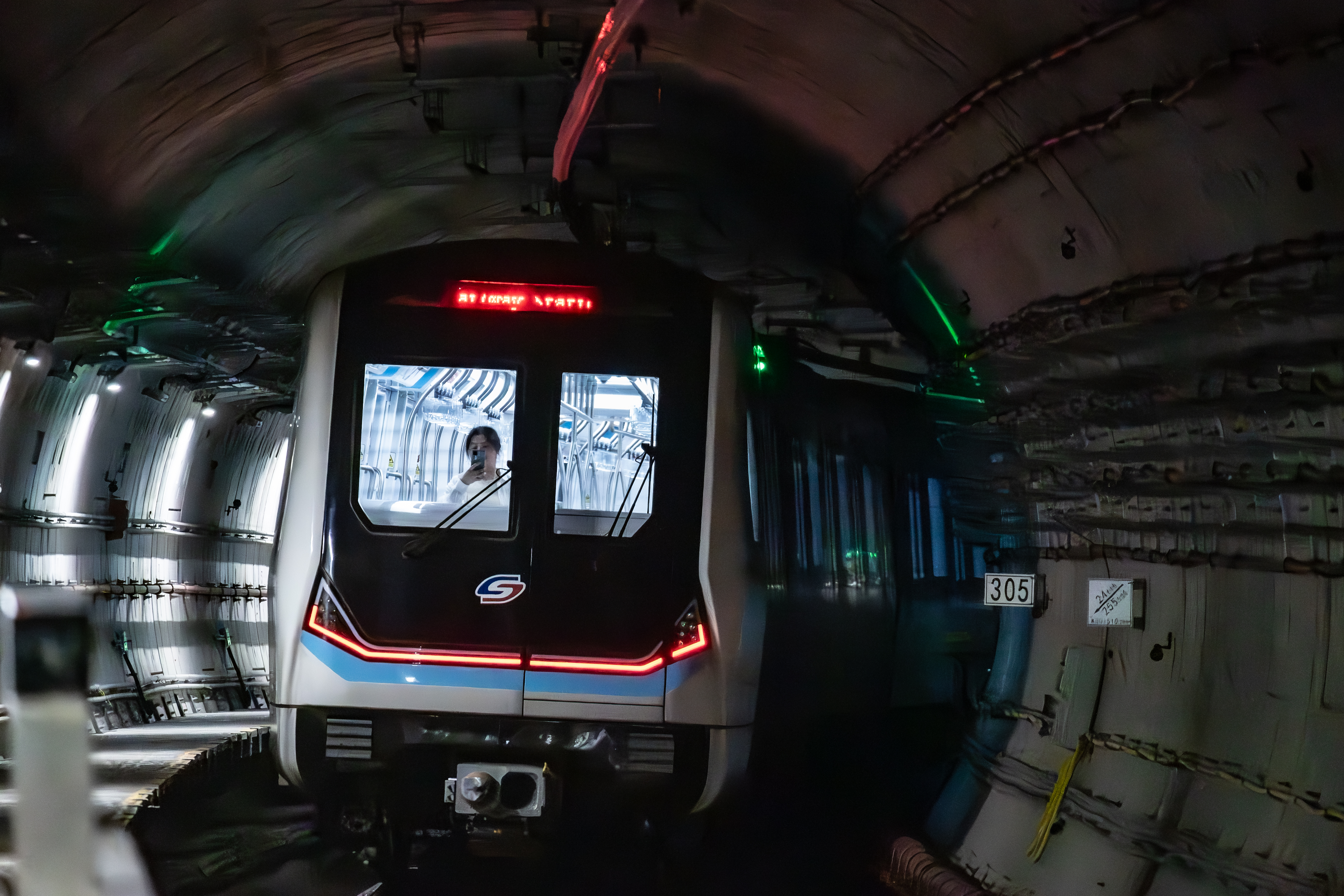
- A train of Suzhou Metro Line 6

Overview
- Status: In Operation
- Owner: Suzhou Rail Transit Co., Ltd
- Termini: Suzhou Xinqu Railway Station; Huayun
- Stations: 31

Service
- Type: Rapid transit
- System: Suzhou Metro
- Operator(s): Suzhou Rail Transit Co., Ltd

History
- Opened: 29 June 2024; 23 months ago

Technical
- Line length: 36.12 km (22.44 mi)
- Track length: 79.2m
- Number of tracks: 2
- Character: Underground
- Track gauge: 1,435 mm (4 ft 8 1/2 in)
- Electrification: overhead wire

Line 6 of the Suzhou Metro is a line partly in operation. Running north-west to south-east, it connects Suzhou New District, Suzhou's city center of Gusu District, and Suzhou Industrial Park. The line 6, except Huayun station, started operation on 29 June 2024.

== Stations ==
Due to construction of Suzhou East railway station of the Tongsujiayong railway, Huayun station is not yet opened for service, where also causes the scissors crossover of Sangtiandao unusable. Trains could not turn around there. As such, line 6 is currently operating as two sections, with transfer at Nanxiebu station:

- Suzhou Xinqu Railway Station - Nanxiebu
- Nanxiebu - Sangtiandao, under single track for shuttle service.

| Service routes | | Station name | | Connections | Distance km | | Location |
| Service routes | | English | Chinese | Connections | Distance km | | Location |
|---|---|---|---|---|---|---|---|
| ● | | Suzhou Xinqu Railway Station | 苏州新区火车站 | 3 ITH; Tram line 2 | 0.00 | 0.00 | New District |
| ● | | Baofeng | 保丰 | | | | New District |
| ● | | Fuqiang | 富强 | | | | Gusu |
| ● | | Changjing | 长泾 | | | | Gusu |
| ● | | Baiyangwangongyuan | 白洋湾公园 | 8 | | | Gusu |
| ● | | Jinjidun | 金鸡墩 | | | | Gusu |
| ● | | Huqiu | 虎丘 | | | | Gusu |
| ● | | Qingshanqiaobang | 清山桥浜 | | | | Gusu |
| ● | | Jiangxingqiao South | 江星桥南 | | | | Gusu |
| ● | | Sujin | 苏锦 | 4 | | | Gusu |
| ● | | Pinghe Lu | 平河路 | 2 | | | Gusu |
| ● | | Meixiang | 梅巷 | | | | Gusu |
| ● | | Humble Administrator's Garden Suzhou Museum | 拙政园苏博 | | | | Gusu |
| ● | | Xuanqiaoxiang | 悬桥巷 | | | | Gusu |
| ● | | Lindun Lu | 临顿路 | 1 | | | Gusu |
| ● | | Wangxingqiao Soochow University | 望星桥苏大 | | | | Gusu |
| ● | | Xujiabang | 徐家浜 | | | | SIP |
| ● | | Reyunqiao | 惹云桥 | 7 | | | SIP |
| ● | | Qiutangbang | 秋塘浜 | | | | SIP |
| ● | | Ligongdi West | 李公堤西 | 3 | | | SIP |
| ● | | Qiongjidun | 琼姬墩 | 8 | | | SIP |
| ● | | Nanshigongyuan South | 南施公园南 | | | | SIP |
| ● | | Suzhou Olympic Sports Centre | 苏州奥体中心 | 5 | | | SIP |
| ● | | Children's Hospital | 儿童医院总院 | | | | SIP |
| ● | | Hanqingqiao | 涵青桥 | | | | SIP |
| ● | | Jinjiayan | 金家堰 | | | | SIP |
| ● | | Beixiebu | 北斜步 | | | | SIP |
| ● | ● | Nanxiebu | 南斜步 | | | | SIP |
| | ● | Jinshang Lu | 金尚路 | 2 | | | SIP |
| | ● | Sangtiandao | 桑田岛 | 2 | | | SIP |
| | | Huayun | 华云 | | | | SIP |

== Rolling stock ==
| Fleet numbers | Year built | Time in service | Builder | Class | Number in service | No of car | Assembly | Rolling stock | Number | Depots | Line assigned | Notes |
|---|---|---|---|---|---|---|---|---|---|---|---|---|
| 240 (40 sets) | 2022–2024 | 2024–present | CRRC Nanjing Puzhen | B | 186 (31 sets) | 6 | Tc+Mp+M - M + Mp+Tc | PM186 | 060101-064006 (0601–0640) | Xushuguan Depot; Sangtiandao Yard | 6 | |
