= Xujiang Lu station =

Suzhou Metro station

Coordinates: 31°17′14″N 120°35′40″E

Xujiang Lu 胥江路
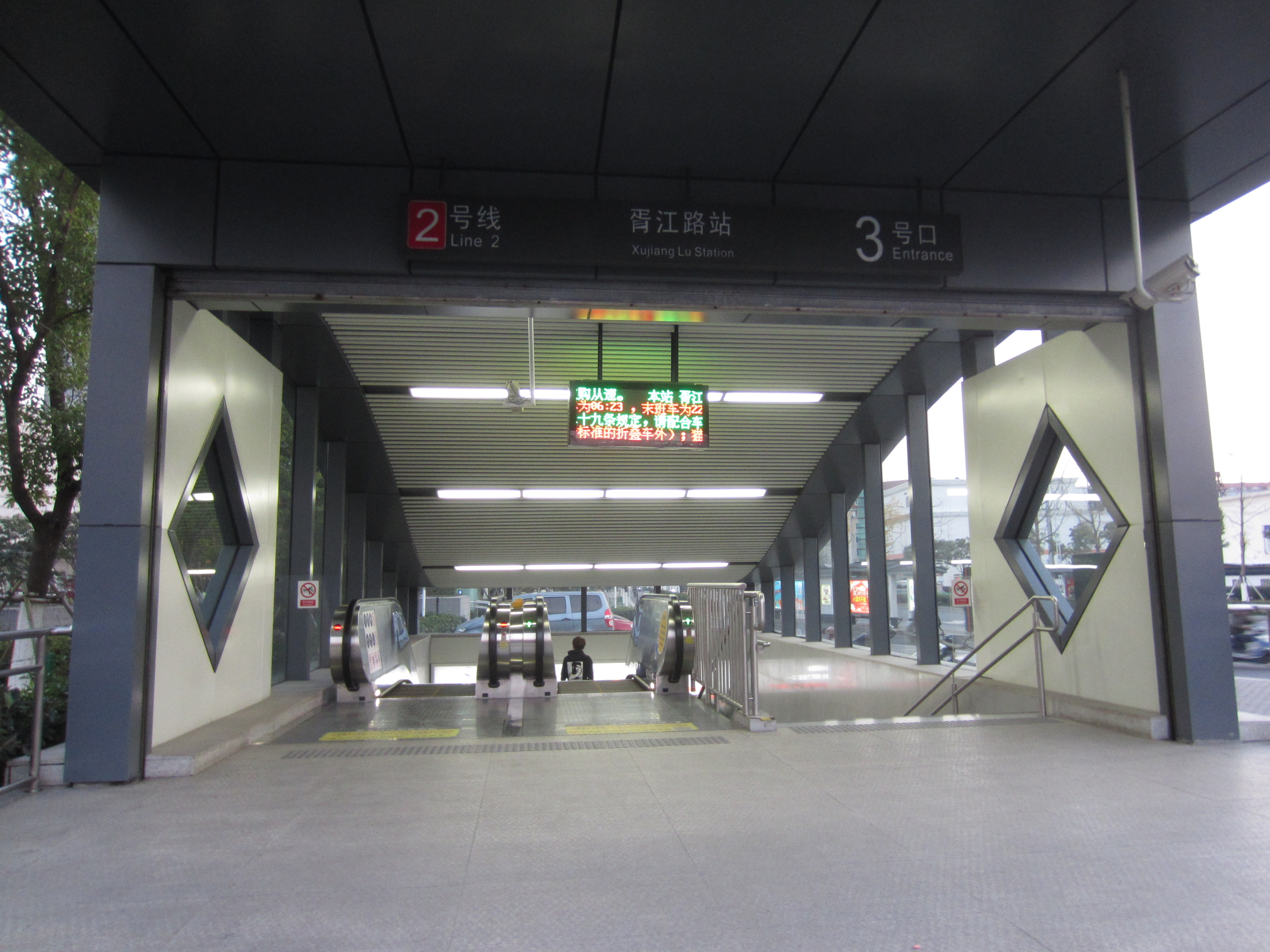

General information
- Location: Gusu District, Suzhou, Jiangsu; China
- Operated by: Suzhou Rail Transit Co., Ltd
- Line: Line 2
- Platforms: 2 (1 island platform)

Construction
- Structure type: Underground

History
- Opened: December 28, 2013

Services
Preceding station	Suzhou Metro	Following station
Laodonglu towards Qihe	Line 2	Tongjing Park towards Sangtiandao

Xujiang Lu Station (Chinese: 胥江路站) is a station on Line 2 of the Suzhou Metro. The station is located in Gusu District of Suzhou. It started service on December 28, 2013, the same time of the operation of Line 2.
