= Shicheng station =

Shicheng station may refer to:

- Shicheng railway station (Taiwan), in Toucheng Township, Yilan County, Taiwan
- Shicheng railway station (Dandong), in Dandong, Liaoning Province, China
- Shicheng station (Suzhou Rail Transit), a metro station on Line 5 of Suzhou Rail Transit, in Suzhou, Jiangsu Province, China
