= Line 5 (Suzhou Metro) =

Metro line in Suzhou, Jiangsu, China

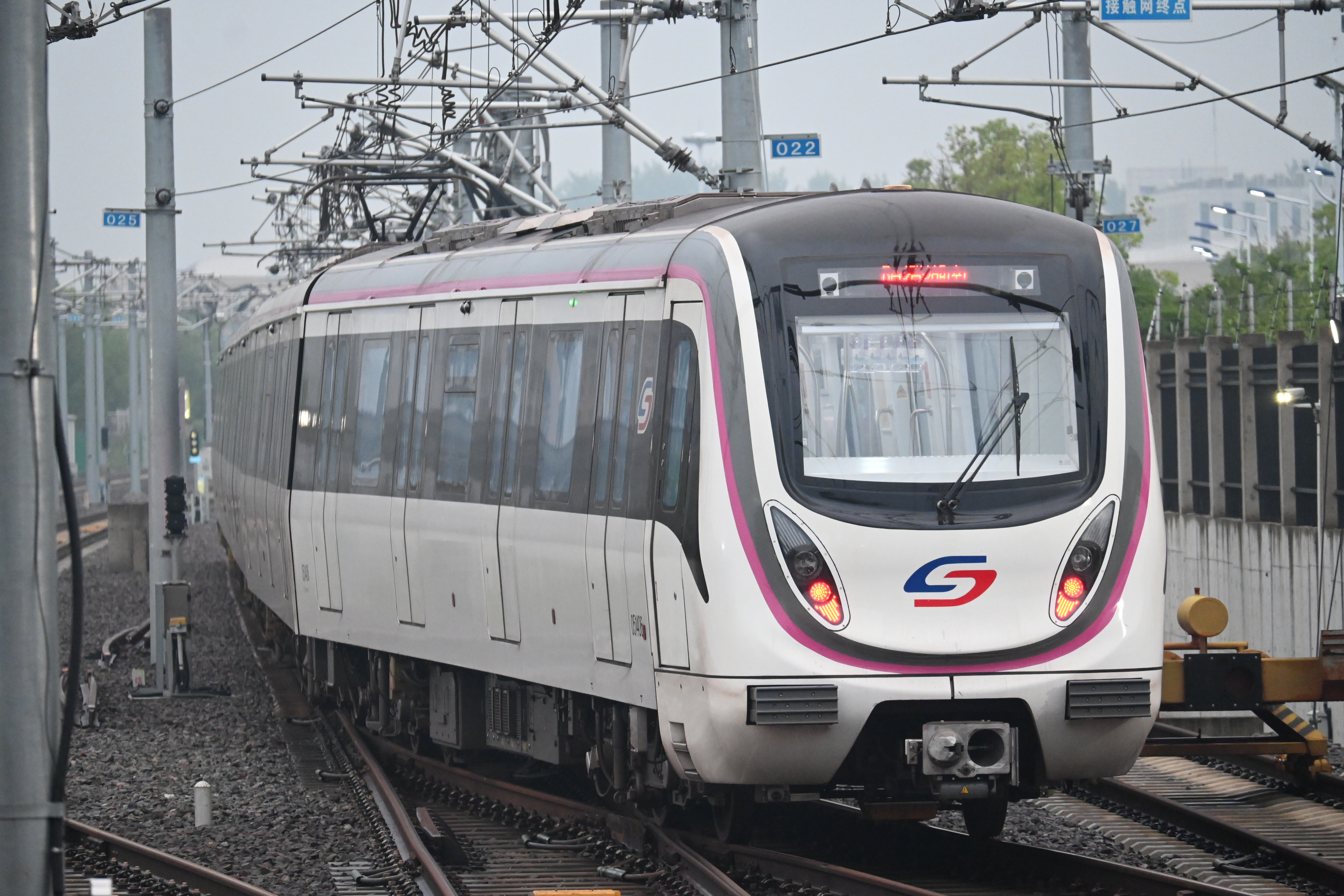
- A train of Suzhou Metro Line 5

Overview
- Status: Operational
- Owner: Suzhou Rail Transit Co., Ltd
- Termini: Taihu Xiangshan; Yangchenghu South
- Stations: 34

Service
- Type: Rapid transit
- System: Suzhou Metro
- Operator(s): Suzhou Rail Transit Co., Ltd

History
- Opened: 29 June 2021; 4 years ago

Technical
- Line length: 44.1 km (27.4 mi)
- Track gauge: 1,435 mm (4 ft 8 1/2 in)

Line 5 is a southwest–northeast line of the Suzhou Metro system. It opened on June 29, 2021. The line is 44.1 kilometers long. Its south-western terminus is at Taihu Xiangshan station in Wuzhong District, with its north-eastern terminus at Yangchenghu South station in Suzhou Industrial Park.

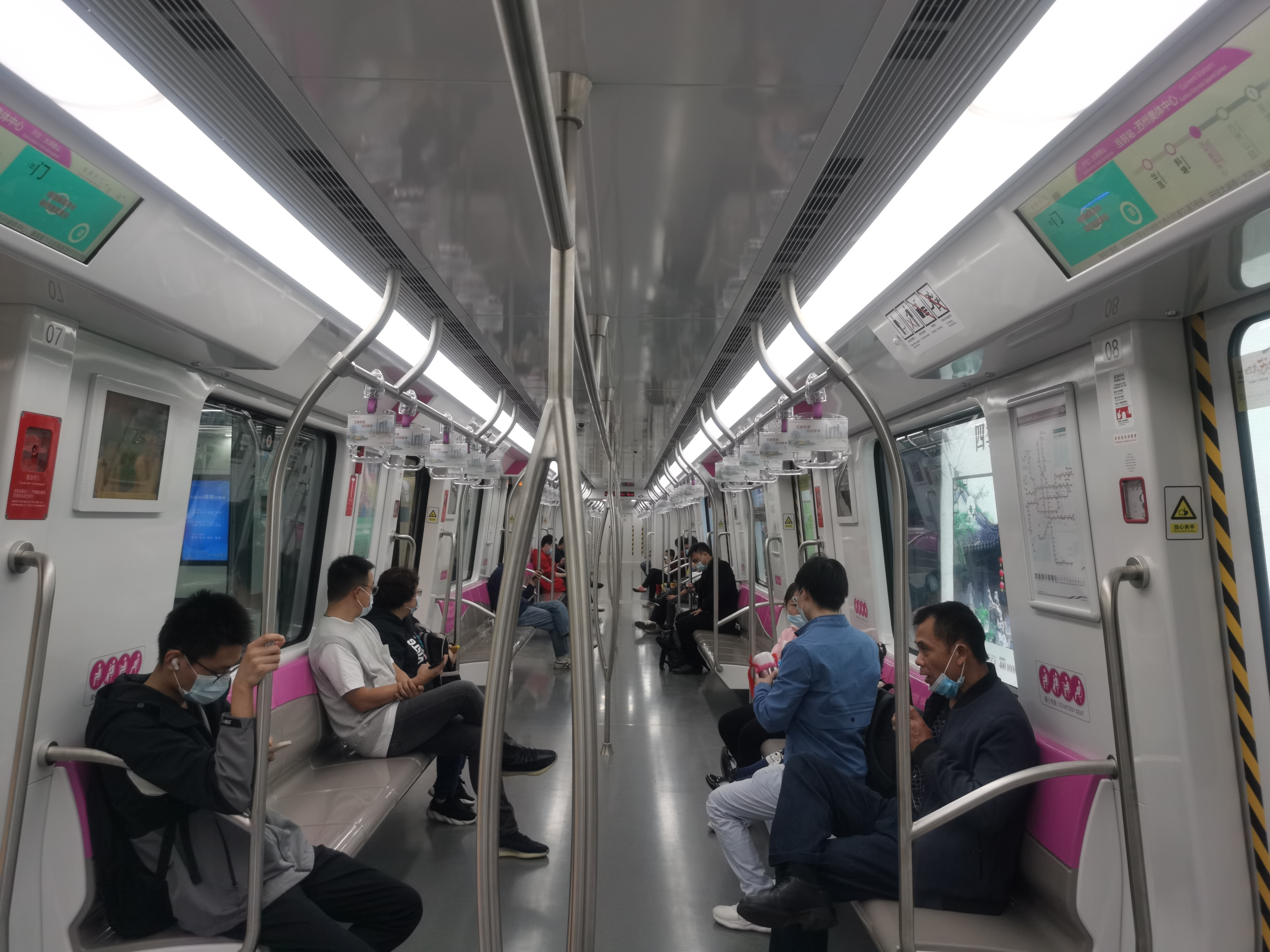
Train interior of Line 5

50 six-car Class B fully automated subway trains were ordered for the line.

== Stations ==
Station name		Connections	Distance km		Location
English	Chinese	Connections	Distance km		Location
Taihu Xiangshan	太湖香山		0.00	0.00	Wuzhong
Huadun	花墩				Wuzhong
Jinqiao	津桥				Wuzhong
Xukou	胥口				Wuzhong
Maopenglu East	茅蓬路东				Wuzhong
Xujiaqiao	许家桥				Wuzhong
Lingyanshan	灵岩山				Wuzhong
Duchuanqiao	渎川桥				Wuzhong
Dazhiqiao	大治桥				Wuzhong
Xikuatang	西跨塘				Wuzhong
Shicheng	石城				Huqiu
Luoxingqiao	落星桥				Huqiu
Suoshanqiao West	索山桥西	3			Huqiu
Shuangqiao	双桥				Gusu
Laodonglu	劳动路	2			Gusu
Xinshiqiao	新市桥				Gusu
Nanmen	南门	4			Gusu
Nanyuanbeilu	南园北路				Gusu
Zhuhuiqiao	竹辉桥				Gusu
Hehuadang	荷花荡				SIP
Huangtiandang	黄天荡	7			SIP
Jinsheqiao	金厍桥	3			SIP
Xingbojie	星波街				SIP
Ligongdi South	李公堤南				SIP
Jinhu	金湖				SIP
Hualian	华莲				SIP
Xietang	斜塘	8			SIP
Suzhou Olympic Sports Centre	苏州奥体中心	6			SIP
Fangzhougongyuan	方洲公园				SIP
Xingtangjie	星塘街	1			SIP
Longdun	龙墩				SIP
Dongshahu	东沙湖				SIP
Fengtingdadao	葑亭大道	3			SIP
Yangchenghu South	阳澄湖南				SIP

== Rolling stock ==
Fleet numbers	Year built	Time in service	Builder	Class	Number in service	No of car	Assembly	Rolling stock	Number	Depots	Line assigned	Notes
300 (50 sets)	2019-2021	2021-present	CRRC Nanjing Puzhen	B	300 (50 sets)	6	Tc+Mp+M - M + Mp+Tc	PM142	050101-055006 (0501-0550)	Xukou Depot; North Weiting Yard	5	
