= Pinglonglu East station =

Suzhou Metro station

Coordinates: 31°20′47″N 120°36′31″E

Pinglonglu East 平泷路东
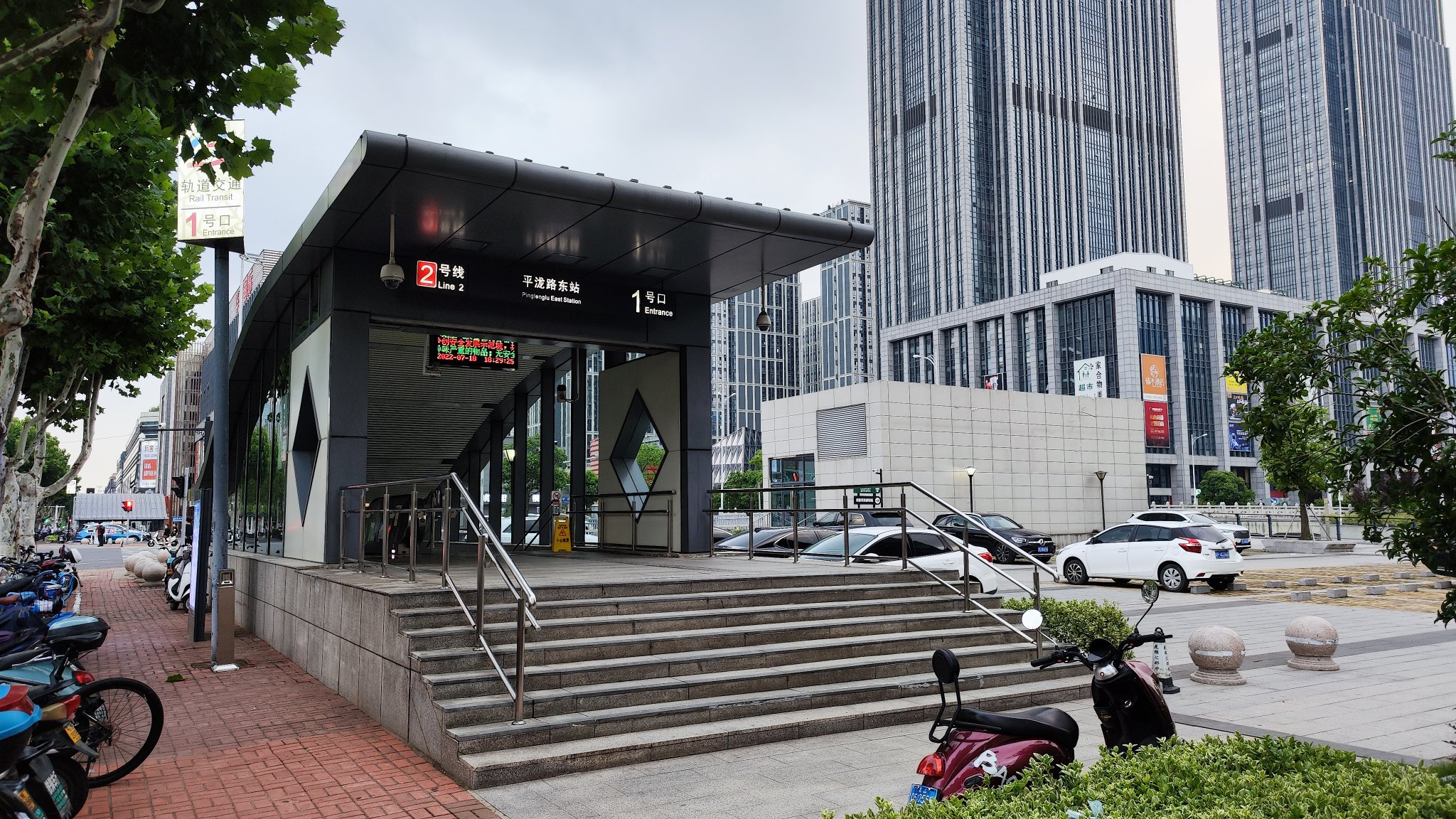

General information
- Location: Xiangcheng District, Suzhou, Jiangsu; China
- Operated by: Suzhou Rail Transit Co., Ltd
- Line: Line 2
- Platforms: 2 (1 island platform)

Construction
- Structure type: Underground

History
- Opened: December 28, 2013

Services
Preceding station	Suzhou Metro	Following station
Lumu towards Qihe	Line 2	Pinghe Lu towards Sangtiandao
Location

Pinglonglu East Station (Chinese: 平泷路东站) is a station on Line 2 of the Suzhou Metro. The station is located in Xiangcheng District of Suzhou. It started service on December 28, 2013, when Line 2 first opened.
