= Pinghelu station =

Suzhou Metro station

Pinghelu 平河路
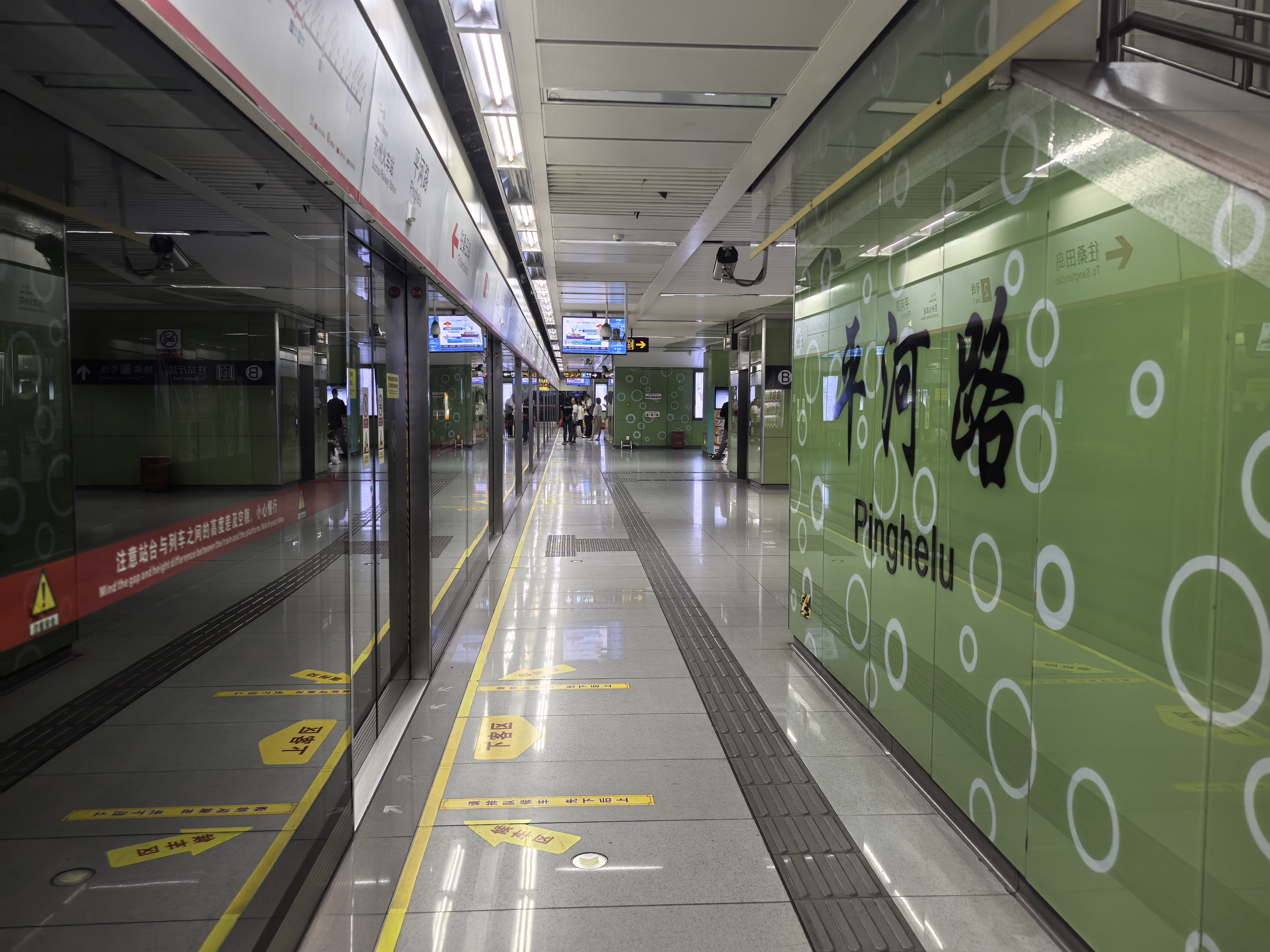
- Line 2 platform

General information
- Location: Renmin Road × Pinghe Road; Gusu District, Suzhou, Jiangsu; China
- Coordinates: 31°20′23″N 120°36′36″E
- Operated by: Suzhou Rail Transit Co., Ltd
- Lines: Line 2 Line 6
- Platforms: 4 (2 island platforms)

Construction
- Structure type: Underground
- Accessible: Yes

History
- Opened: December 28, 2013

Services
Preceding station	Suzhou Metro	Following station
Pinglonglu East towards Qihe	Line 2	Suzhou Railway Station towards Sangtiandao
Sujin towards Suzhou Xinqu Railway Station	Line 6	Meixiang towards Sangtiandao
Location

Pinghelu station (Chinese: 平河路站), formerly known as Pinghe Lu station, is a station on Line 2 and Line 6 of the Suzhou Metro. The station is located in Gusu District of Suzhou. It started service on December 28, 2013, when Line 2 first opened.
