= Dongzhu =

Town in Jiangsu, China

Coordinates: 31.3361°N 120.4026°E

Dongzhu (东渚) is a town under the administration of Suzhou New District and Huqiu District (the two districts are temporarily combined now), Suzhou, Jiangsu, China, which located at the west of Suzhou City and by the Taihu Lake.

The changes of upper-level administration in the past years before contained in SND and Huqiu District were that, Wuzhong District, Wuxian City, Wu-County, in the reversed chronological order.

Historically, Dongzhu was closely related with the history of Suzhou which called the Country of Wu more than 2500 years ago. The loser King of Wu, Helu, who ever won the war with Goujian, the King of Yue (located now near Hangzhou), suicided at the top of the mountain of Yangshan (Sun-Mountain) in the area of Dongzhu. There are also other ruins in the Town Dongzhu.

== Industry ==
Dongzhu is one of far less industrialized contrasts to those towns near around the Suzhou City. The main industry of Dongzhu now is still the agriculture, while it also featured in its traditional handcraft industry, handy embroidery, which is known as Suzhou Embroidery and sculpture of stone.

However, since it was contained into SND and Huqiu District, agricultural land was withdrawn conditionally by the administration, a new area is now prepared for the open of the city's modern scientific research center, and is expected to be a great change for the town.

== Communications ==
There are several bus systems go through Dongzhu, as well as recently established express way, so called Taihu Dadao, which make the time spent between Dongzhu and Suzhou City from more than an hour to now, only twenty-five minutes. There is also a traditional waterway—Xuguang Canal, connecting Taihu Lake with the City.

Although there are two domestic civil airports, Guangfu Airport and Shuofang Airport near the town, however, the air routes is limited in number. Many people there use the Pudong International Airport and Hongqiao Airport for international and domestic travel.

== Education ==
There are two educational organizations in Dongzhu include one elementary and one middle school, and no organization for higher educations. The two schools are, Dongzhu Experimental Primary School and Dongzhu Middle School.
