= Suzhou High-tech Zone =

Suzhou High-tech Zone 苏州高新区
- District
- Interactive map of Suzhou High-tech Zone
- Coordinates (Suzhou New District railway station): 31°22′20″N 120°31′31″E
- Country: China
- Province: Jiangsu
- Prefecture-level city: Suzhou
- Time zone: UTC+8 (China Standard)

The Suzhou High-tech Zone (Chinese: 苏州高新区; known as Suzhou New District before September 2002) is a municipal section for technological and industrial development in Suzhou, Jiangsu, China. Since September 2002, it has been under the "one institution with two names" arrangement with the district of Huqiu, Suzhou.

The district covers an area of 52 km^{2} (20 sq mi) and is located five kilometres (3.1 mi) west of Suzhou, in Jiangsu province. The district is managed by the Suzhou New District High-Tech Industrial Co., Ltd. (苏州新区高新技术产业股份有限公司), which, in turn, is owned by the Suzhou municipal government.

== History ==
Suzhou New District was established by the Central People's Government on November 18, 1992. Its establishment aimed to relocate industrial operations from Suzhou's historic center to the outskirts in order to preserve cultural and historical significance while facilitating economic growth. It was one of the first industry parks opened to attract foreign investors from APEC countries. It served as an export base for technology-related services and products in China.

The establishment of Suzhou New District helped facilitate Suzhou's successful efforts to obtain UNESCO World Heritage site designation for the Classical Gardens of Suzhou in 1995.

In 2003, the district's total output value is 25.1 billion yuan. Industrial sales of 70.06 billion yuan, The local budget revenue was 1.53 billion yuan and export of US$8.76 billion. Up to the end of 2003, the district has attracted a total of over 800 foreign projects including 40 multinational corporations. Foreign investment has reached over US$6 billion while the actually utilized investment reached US$3.4 billion. The district attracts many different types of industries, including consumer electronics, information technology, precision instruments, biotechnology, and pharmaceuticals.

== Education ==
The is in the district It formerly housed the Suzhou Japanese Saturday School, which had classes held at the Suzhou Foreign Language School (苏州外国语学校) in Suzhou New District.

The Japanese School of Suzhou, located within the Suzhou New District, in China, plays a significant role in the education and cultural exchange between Japan and China. It was formerly known as the Suzhou Japanese Saturday School, and its history and association with the Suzhou Foreign Language School (苏州外国语学校) add to its uniqueness and importance within the district.

Before relocating to its current location within the Suzhou New District, the school initially operated as the Suzhou Japanese Saturday School. During this period, classes were held at the Suzhou Foreign Language School.

== See also ==
- Dongzhu
- Suzhou Industrial Park
