= Huqiu, Suzhou =

Huqiu 虎丘区
- District
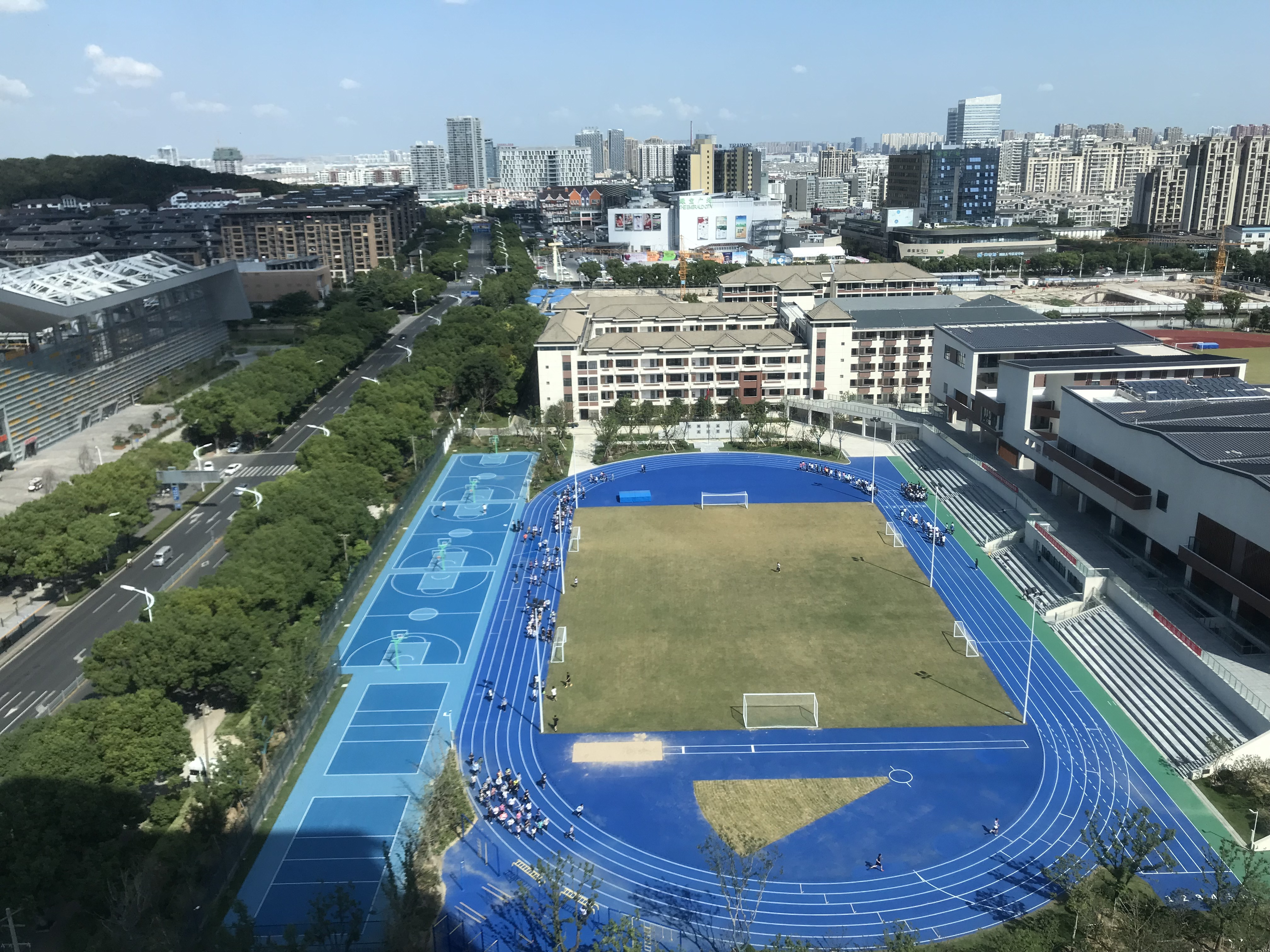
- Huqiu District in September 2018

- Location in Jiangsu
- Coordinates: 31°19′10″N 120°24′30″E
- Country: People's Republic of China
- Province: Jiangsu
- Prefecture-level city: Suzhou

Area
  - District: 332.37 km^{2} (128.33 sq mi)

Population (2020 census)
  - District: 832,499
  - Density: 2,504.7/km^{2} (6,487.2/sq mi)
  - Urban: 763,606
  - Rural: 68,893
- Time zone: UTC+8 (China Standard)
- Postal code: 215004
- Website: http://www.snd.gov.cn/

Huqiu District (Chinese: 虎丘区) is one of five municipal districts of Suzhou, Jiangsu province, China. The district is named after Tiger Hill, a local hill and tourist attraction. Huqiu District also operates under the name Suzhou High-tech Zone (苏州高新区) with the "one institution with two names" arrangement.

== Administrative divisions ==
In the present, Huqiu District has 3 subdistricts and 3 towns.

3 subdistricts

- Fengqiao (枫桥街道)
- Shishan (狮山街道)
- Hengtang (横塘街道)

3 towns

- Hushuguan (浒墅关镇)
- Tong'an (通安镇)
- Dongzhu (东渚镇)
