= Yangchenghu South station =

Suzhou Metro station

Yangchenghu South 阳澄湖南
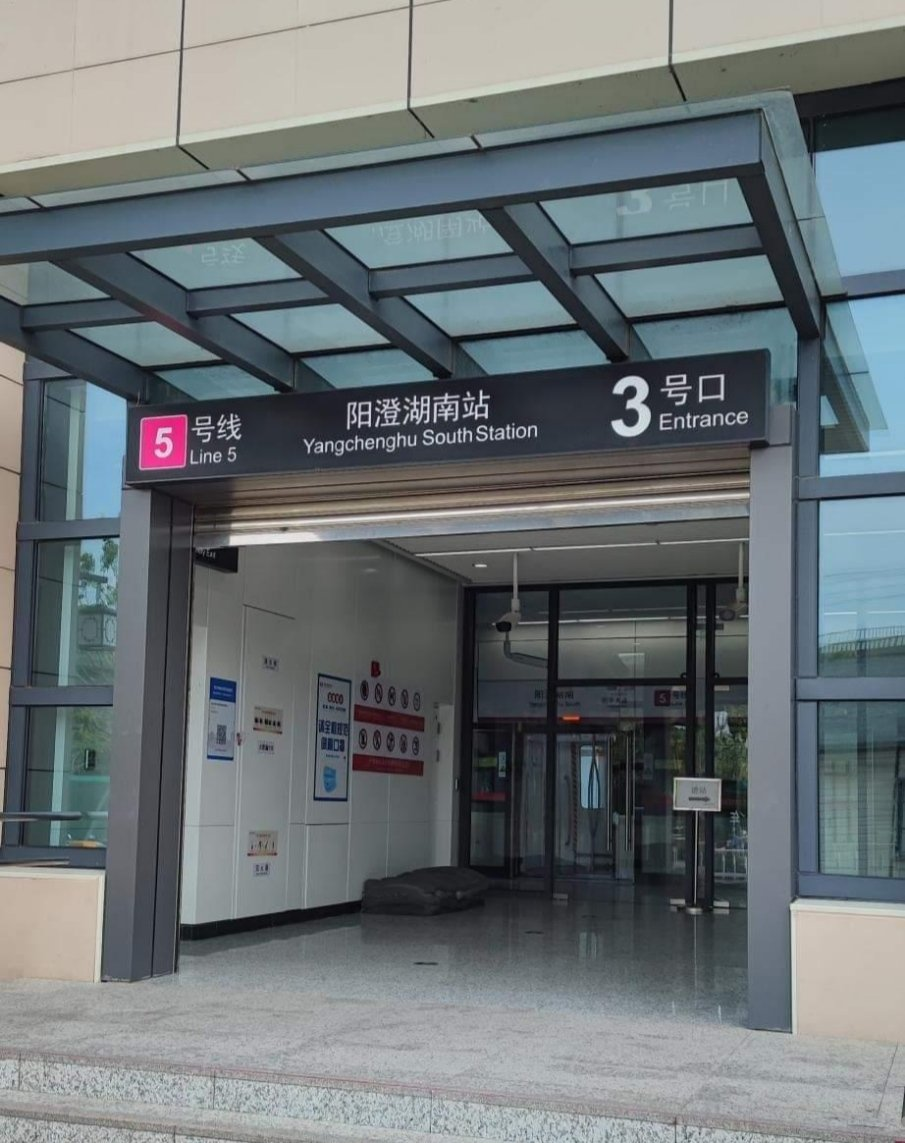

General information
- Location: Suzhou Industrial Park, Suzhou, Jiangsu; China
- Operated by: Suzhou Rail Transit Co., Ltd
- Line: Line 5
- Platforms: 2 (2 side platforms)

Construction
- Structure type: Ground level

History
- Opened: June 29, 2021

Services
Preceding station	Suzhou Metro	Following station
Fengtingdadao towards Taihu Xiangshan	Line 5	Terminus
Location

Yangchenghu South station (Chinese: 阳澄湖南) is the North-Eastern terminus of Line 5 of the Suzhou Metro. The station is located in Suzhou Industrial Park, Suzhou, Jiangsu Province. It has been in use since June 29, 2021, when Line 5 opened to the public, and is located on the south bank of Yangcheng Lake.
