= Taihu Xiangshan station =

Suzhou Metro station

Taihu Xiangshan 太湖香山
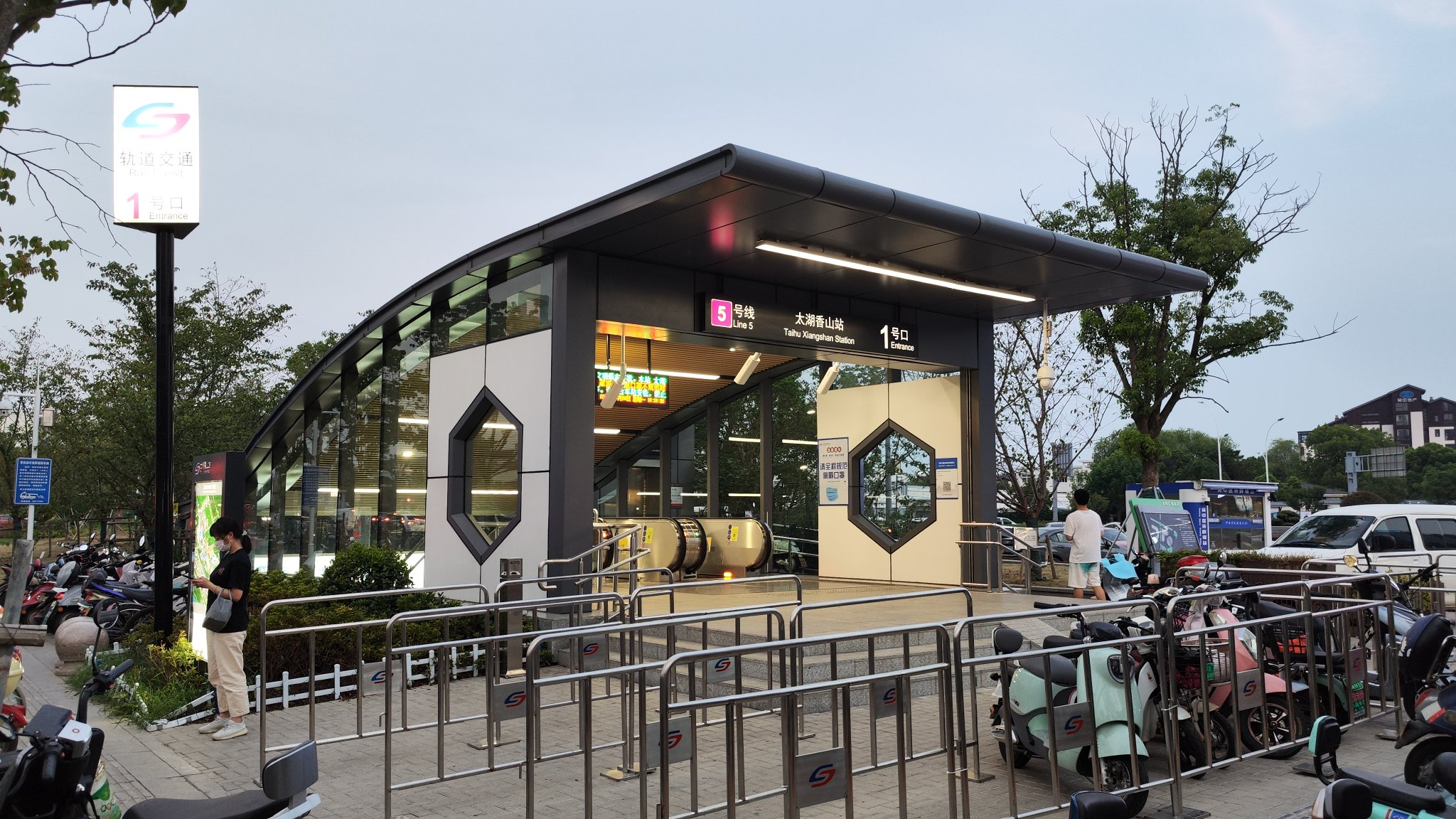

General information
- Location: Wuzhong District, Suzhou, Jiangsu; China
- Operated by: Suzhou Rail Transit Co., Ltd
- Line: Line 5
- Platforms: 2 (1 island platform)

Construction
- Structure type: Underground

History
- Opened: June 29, 2021

Services
| Preceding station | Suzhou Metro | Following station |
|---|---|---|
| Terminus | Line 5 | Huadun towards Yangchenghu South |
Location

Taihu Xiangshan Station (Chinese: 太湖香山) is the South-Western terminus of Line 5 of the Suzhou Metro. The station is located in Wuzhong District, Jiangsu, within the Xiangshan area of Lake Tai. It has been in use since June 29, 2021, when Line 5 first opened to the public.
