= Shihu =

Shihu or Shi Hu may refer to:

== People ==
- Shi Hu (295–349, reigned 334–349), emperor of Later Zhao
- Dānapāla (died 1017), Indian Buddhist monk in China, known as Shihu in Chinese
- Shi Hu (artist) (born 1942)

== Places in China ==
- Shihu, Jilin, in Tonghua County, Jilin
- Shihu, Lianshui County, Jiangsu
- Shihu Township, Anhui, in Guzhen County, Bengbu, Anhui
- Shihu Township, Jiangsu, in Donghai County, Lianyungang, Jiangsu
- Lake Shi (石湖; Shí Hú), fresh water lake in the southeast of Suzhou, Jiangsu

== Transport ==
- Shihu Moshe station in Wuzhong District, Suzhou, Jiangsu

== See also ==
- Hu Shih (1891–1962), Chinese scholar and politician
- Sihu (disambiguation)
- Xihu (disambiguation)
