= Tongyuanlu South station =

Suzhou Metro station

Coordinates: 31°16′17″N 120°39′49″E

Tongyuanlu South 通园路南
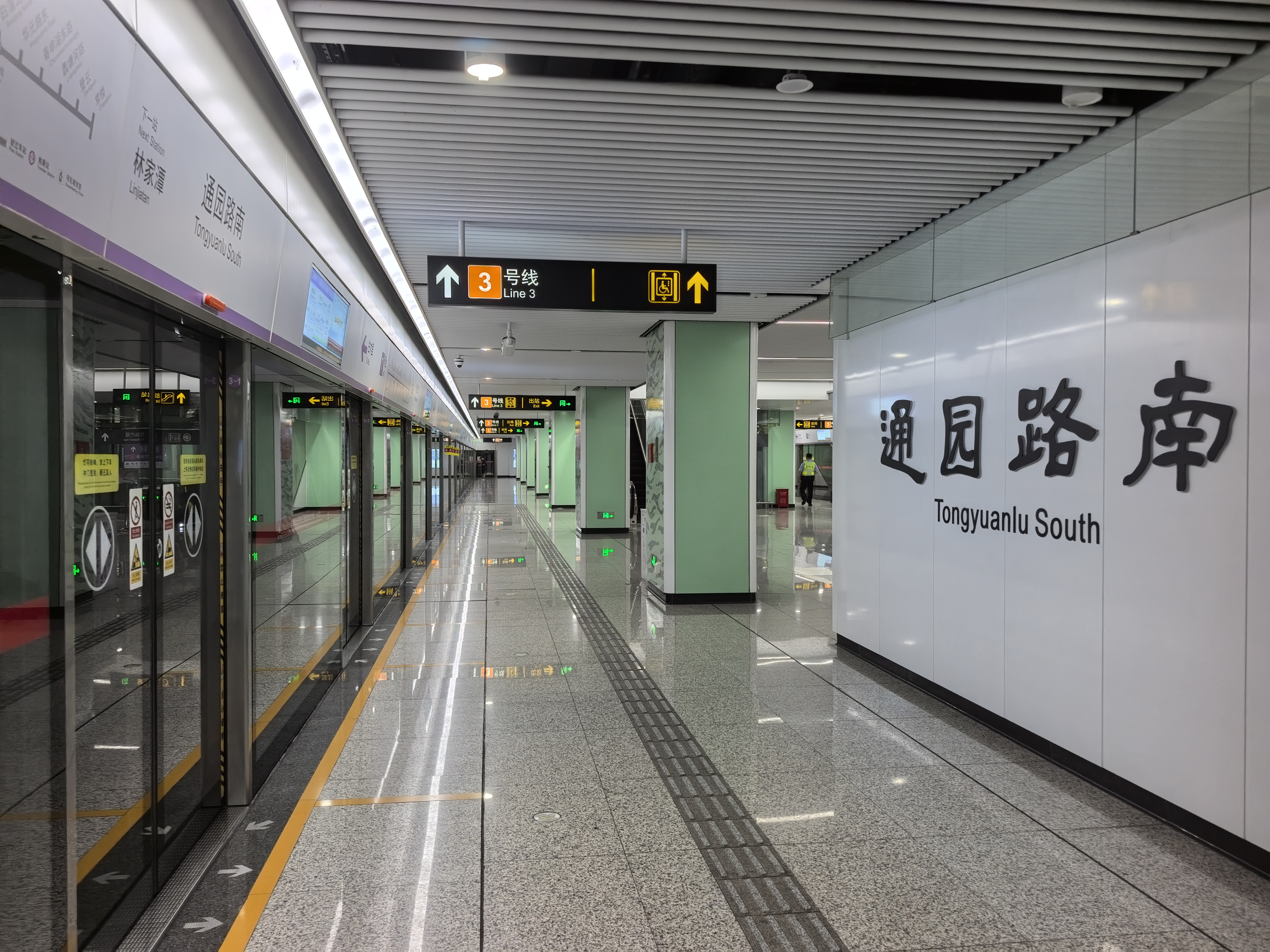
- Platform of Line 7

General information
- Location: Suzhou Industrial Park, Suzhou, Jiangsu; China
- Operated by: Suzhou Rail Transit Co., Ltd
- Lines: Line 3 Line 7
- Platforms: 2 (1 island platform)

Construction
- Structure type: Underground

History
- Opened: December 25, 2019

Services
Preceding station	Suzhou Metro	Following station
Beiganglu towards Suzhou Xinqu Railway Station	Line 3	Shupulu North towards Weiting
Qunli towards Changlou	Line 7	Linjiatan towards Muli
Location

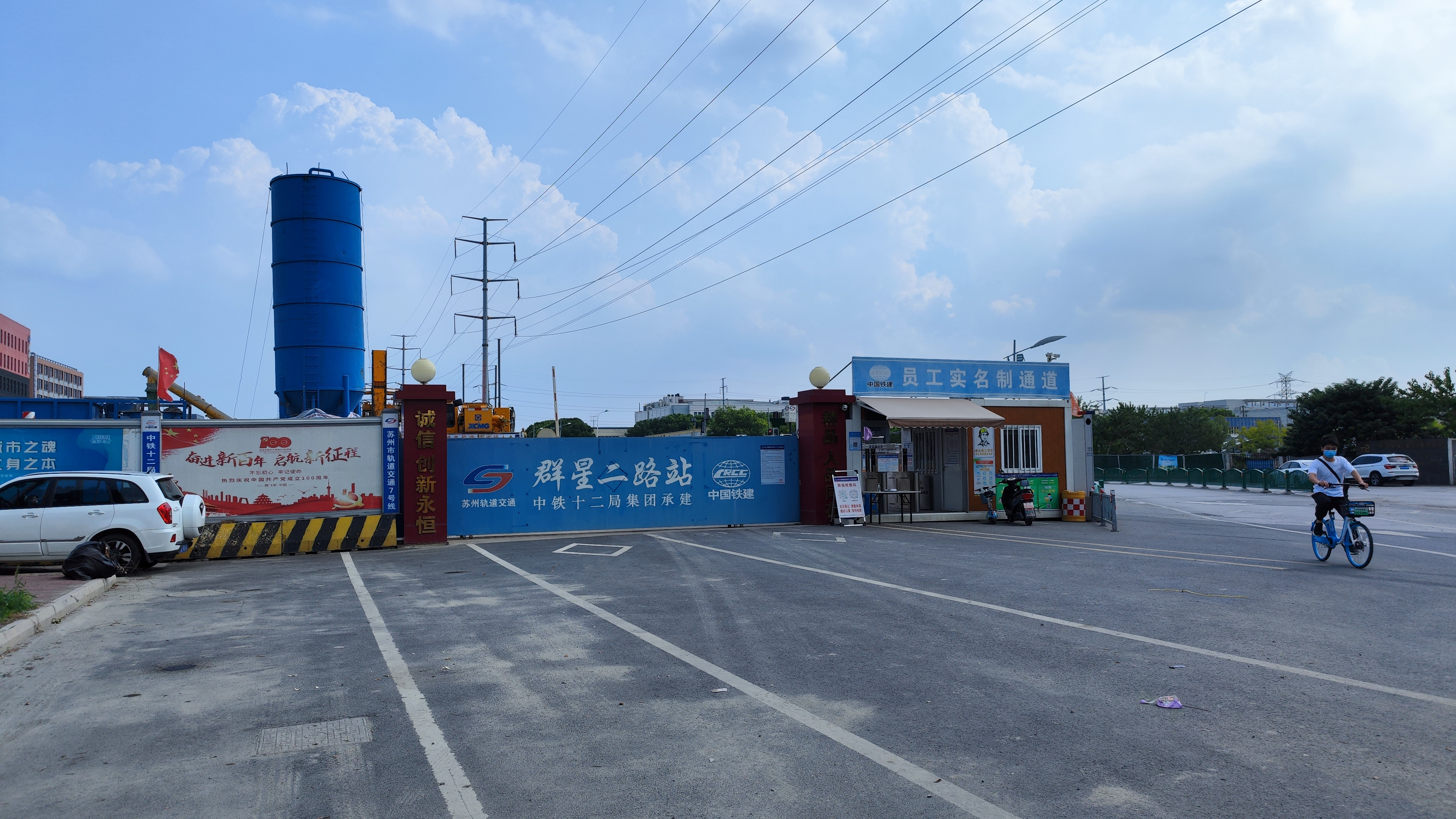
Line 7 under construction at Tongyuanlu South

Tongyuanlu South Station (Chinese: 通园路南) is a station on Line 3 and Line 7 of the Suzhou Metro. The station is located in Suzhou Industrial Park, Jiangsu. It has been in use since December 25, 2019, when Line 3 first opened to the public.
