= Shihu North station =

Suzhou Metro station

Coordinates: 31°15′39″N 120°34′57″E

Shihu North 石湖北
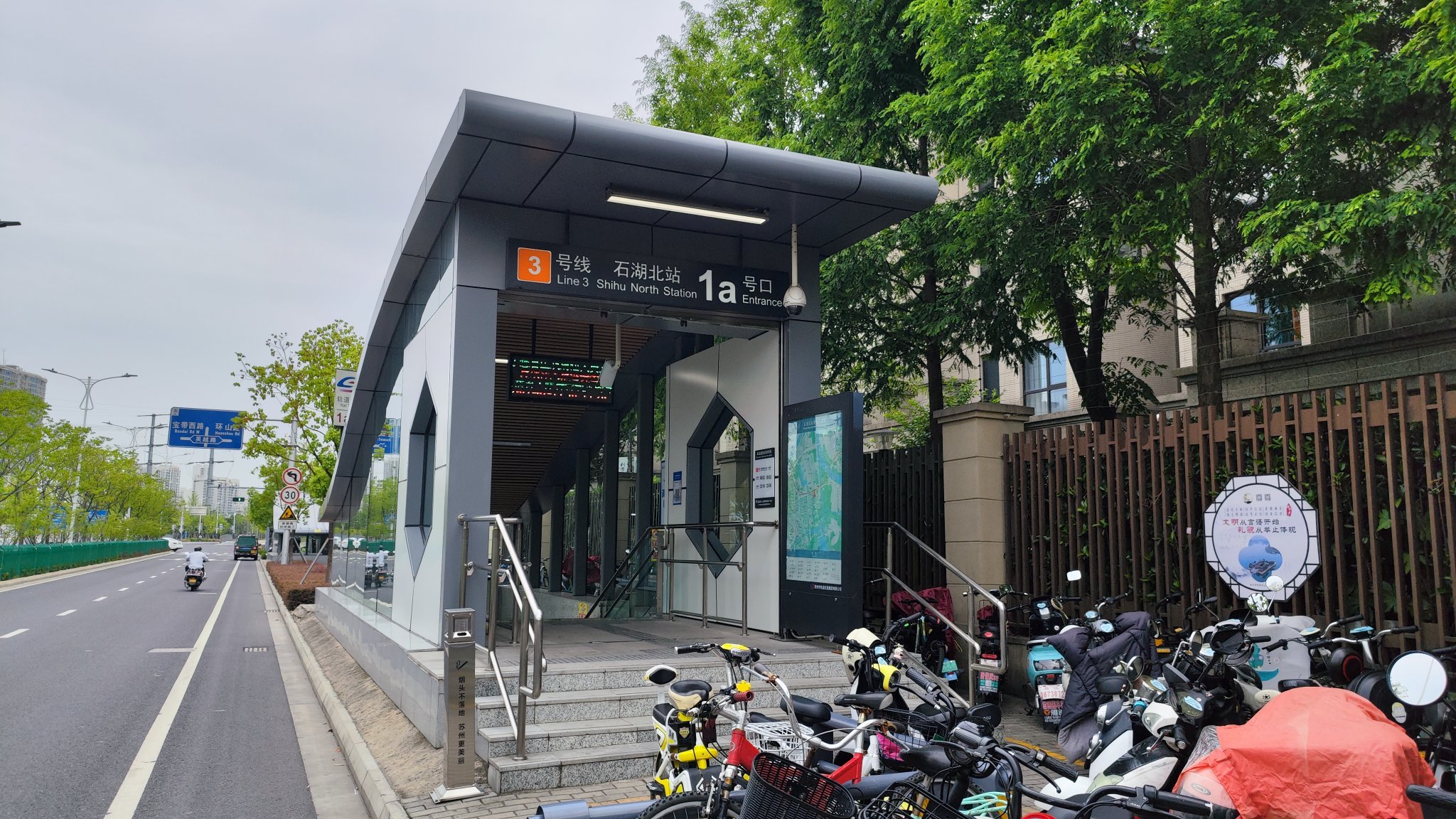

General information
- Location: Huqiu District, Suzhou, Jiangsu; China
- Operated by: Suzhou Rail Transit Co., Ltd
- Line(s): Line 3
- Platforms: 2 (1 island platform)

Construction
- Structure type: Underground

History
- Opened: December 25, 2019

Services
Preceding station	Suzhou Metro	Following station
Hengtang towards Suzhou Xinqu Railway Station	Line 3	Xinguo towards Weiting

Shihu North Station (Chinese: 石湖北) is a station on Line 3 of the Suzhou Metro. The station is located in Huqiu District, Suzhou. It has been in use since December 25, 2019, when Line 3 first opened to the public. The station is located to the north of Lake Shi, and is the final station of Line 3 to be located in Huqiu District.
