= Xinguo station =

Suzhou Metro station

Coordinates: 31°15′54″N 120°35′33″E

Xinguo 新郭
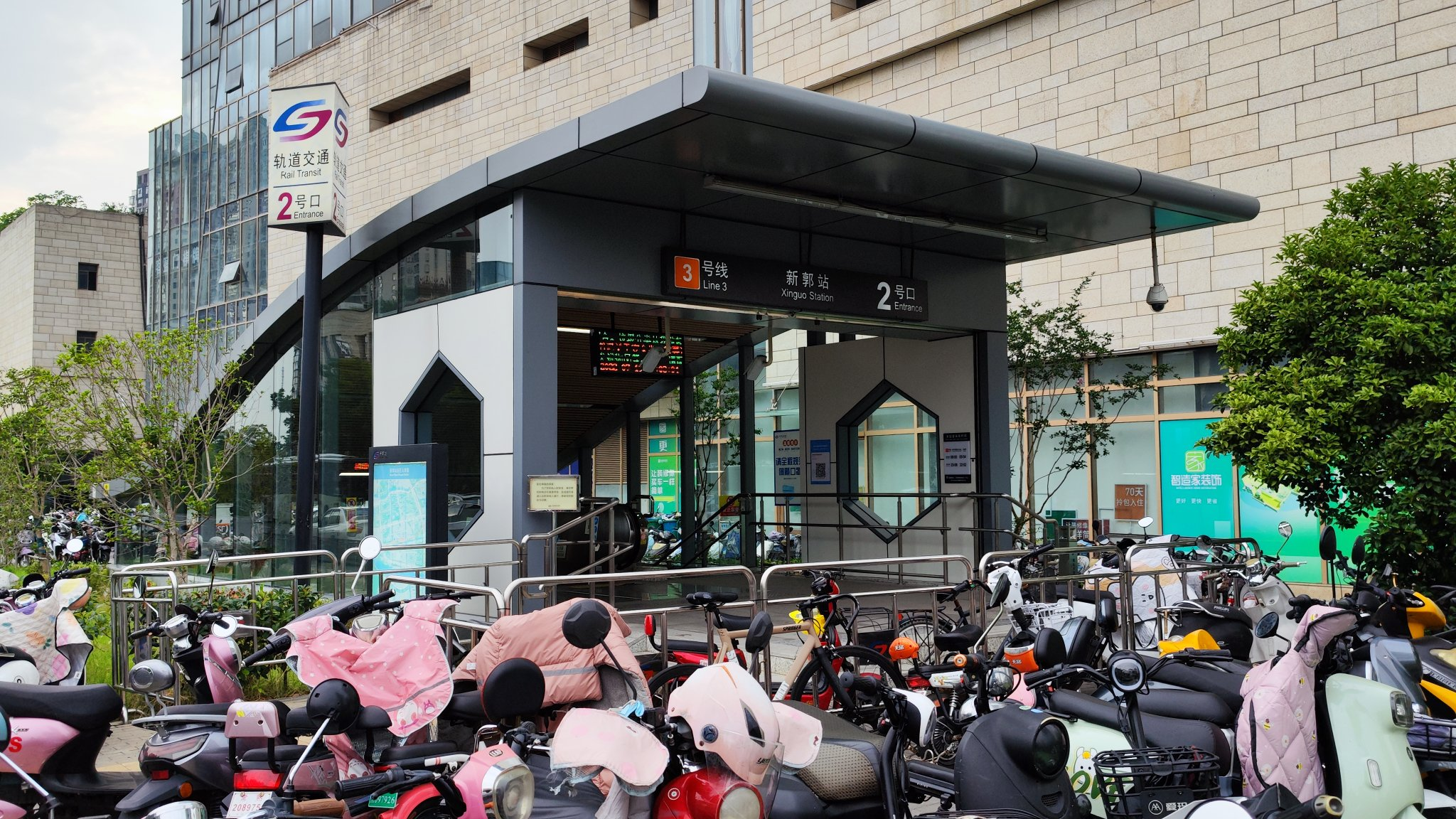

General information
- Location: Gusu District, Suzhou, Jiangsu; China
- Operated by: Suzhou Rail Transit Co., Ltd
- Line: Line 3
- Platforms: 2 (1 island platform)

Construction
- Structure type: Underground

History
- Opened: December 25, 2019

Services
Preceding station	Suzhou Metro	Following station
Shihu North towards Suzhou Xinqu Railway Station	Line 3	Panlilu towards Weiting

Xinguo Station (Chinese: 新郭) is a station on Line 3 of the Suzhou Metro. The station is located in Gusu District, Suzhou. It has been in use since December 25, 2019; when Line 3 first opened to the public. It is the only station of Line 3 to be located in Gusu District, with all preceding stations being found in Huqiu District, and all following stations located in either Wuzhong District or Suzhou Industrial Park.
