= Panlilu station =

Suzhou Metro station

Panlilu 盘蠡路
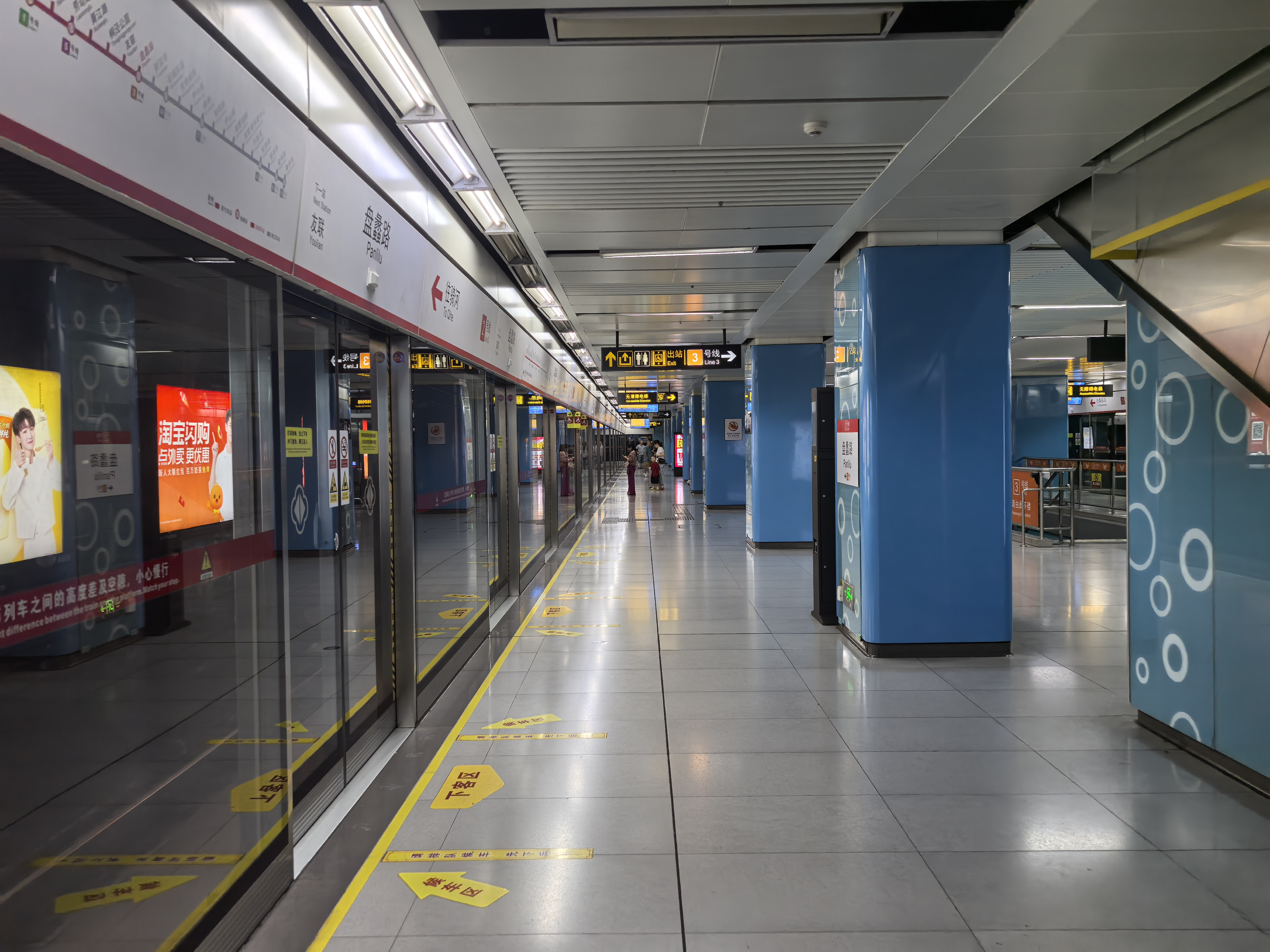
- Line 2 platform

General information
- Location: Panli Road (盘蠡路) × Baodai West Road (宝带西路); Wuzhong District, Suzhou, Jiangsu; China
- Coordinates: 31°16′02″N 120°36′38″E
- Operated by: Suzhou Rail Transit Co., Ltd
- Lines: Line 2; Line 3
- Platforms: 4 (2 island platforms)

Construction
- Structure type: Underground

History
- Opened: December 28, 2013
- Previous names: Panli Lu

Services
Preceding station	Suzhou Metro	Following station
Youlian towards Qihe	Line 2	Xinjia Qiao towards Sangtiandao
Xinguo towards Suzhou Xinqu Railway Station	Line 3	Baodailu towards Weiting
Location

Panlilu Station (Chinese: 盘蠡路站), formerly known as Panli Lu Station, is a station of Line 2 and Line 3 of the Suzhou Metro. The station is located in Wuzhong District of Suzhou. It started operation on December 28, 2013, the same time of the operation of Line 2. The Line 3 platforms opened along with the opening of the line in December 2019.
