= Hengtang station =

Suzhou Metro station

Coordinates: 31°16′15″N 120°34′23″E

Hengtang 横塘
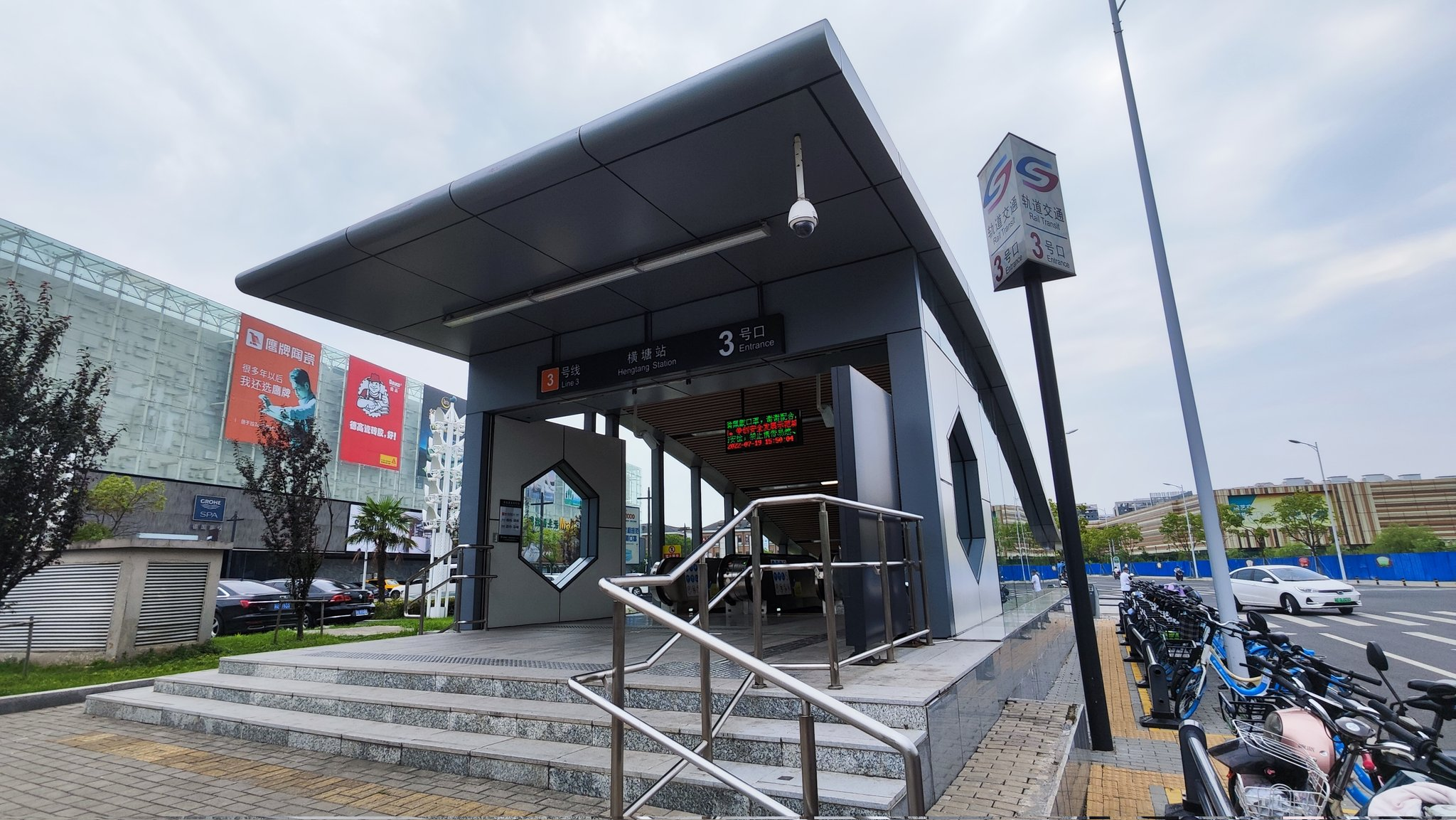

General information
- Location: Huqiu District, Suzhou, Jiangsu; China
- Operated by: Suzhou Rail Transit Co., Ltd
- Line: Line 3
- Platforms: 2 (1 island platform)

Construction
- Structure type: Underground

History
- Opened: December 25, 2019

Services
| Preceding station | Suzhou Metro | Following station |
|---|---|---|
| Hengshan towards Suzhou Xinqu Railway Station | Line 3 | Shihu North towards Weiting |

Hengtang Station (Chinese: 横塘) is a station on Line 3 of the Suzhou Metro. The station is located in Huqiu District, Suzhou. It has been in use since December 25, 2019, when Line 3 first opened to the public.
