= Hongzhuang station =

Suzhou Metro station

Hongzhuang 红庄
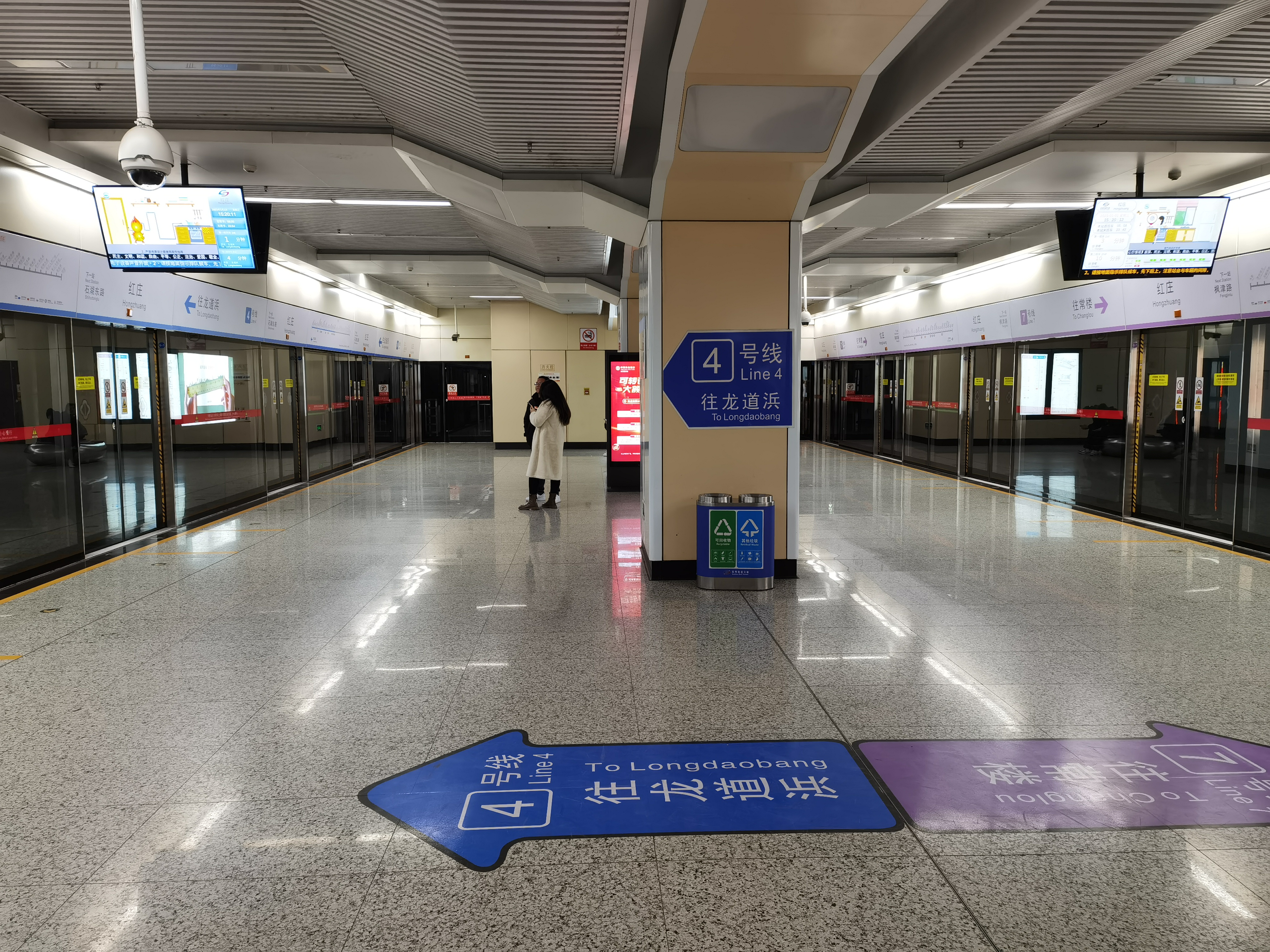
- Line 4 platform to Longdaobang (left) and Line 7 platform to Changlou (right)

General information
- Location: Wuzhong Avenue; Wuzhong District, Suzhou, Jiangsu; China
- Coordinates: 31°14′19″N 120°37′29″E
- Operator: Suzhou Rail Transit Co., Ltd
- Lines: Line 4 Line 7
- Platforms: 4 (2 island platforms)

Construction
- Structure type: Underground

History
- Opened: April 15, 2017

Services
Preceding station	Suzhou Metro	Following station
Shihu Donglu towards Longdaobang	Line 4	Qingshuwan towards Tongli
Fengjinlu towards Changlou	Line 7	Lishu towards Muli
Location

Hongzhuang (Chinese: 红庄) is an interchange station between Line 4 and Line 7 of the Suzhou Metro. The station is located in Wuzhong District of Suzhou. It has been in use since April 15, 2017, when Line 4 first opened.

Hongzhuang station served as the intersection point between the two branches of Line 4, going towards Muli and Tongli, until the Muli branch was incorporated into Line 7.

== Station structure ==
A cross-platform interchange is provided between Line 4 and Line 7.

G	Ground level	Exits
B1	Concourse	Tickets, Customer Service Center
B2		← Line 4 towards Longdaobang (Shihu Donglu)
B2	Island Platform, doors will open on the right for Line 7, left for Line 4
B2		← Line 7 towards Changlou (Fengjinlu)
B2		Line 7 towards Muli (Lishu) →
B2	Island Platform, doors will open on the right for Line 7, left for Line 4
B2		Line 4 towards Tongli (Qingshuwan) →
