= Yuexi station =

Suzhou Metro station

Yuexi 越溪
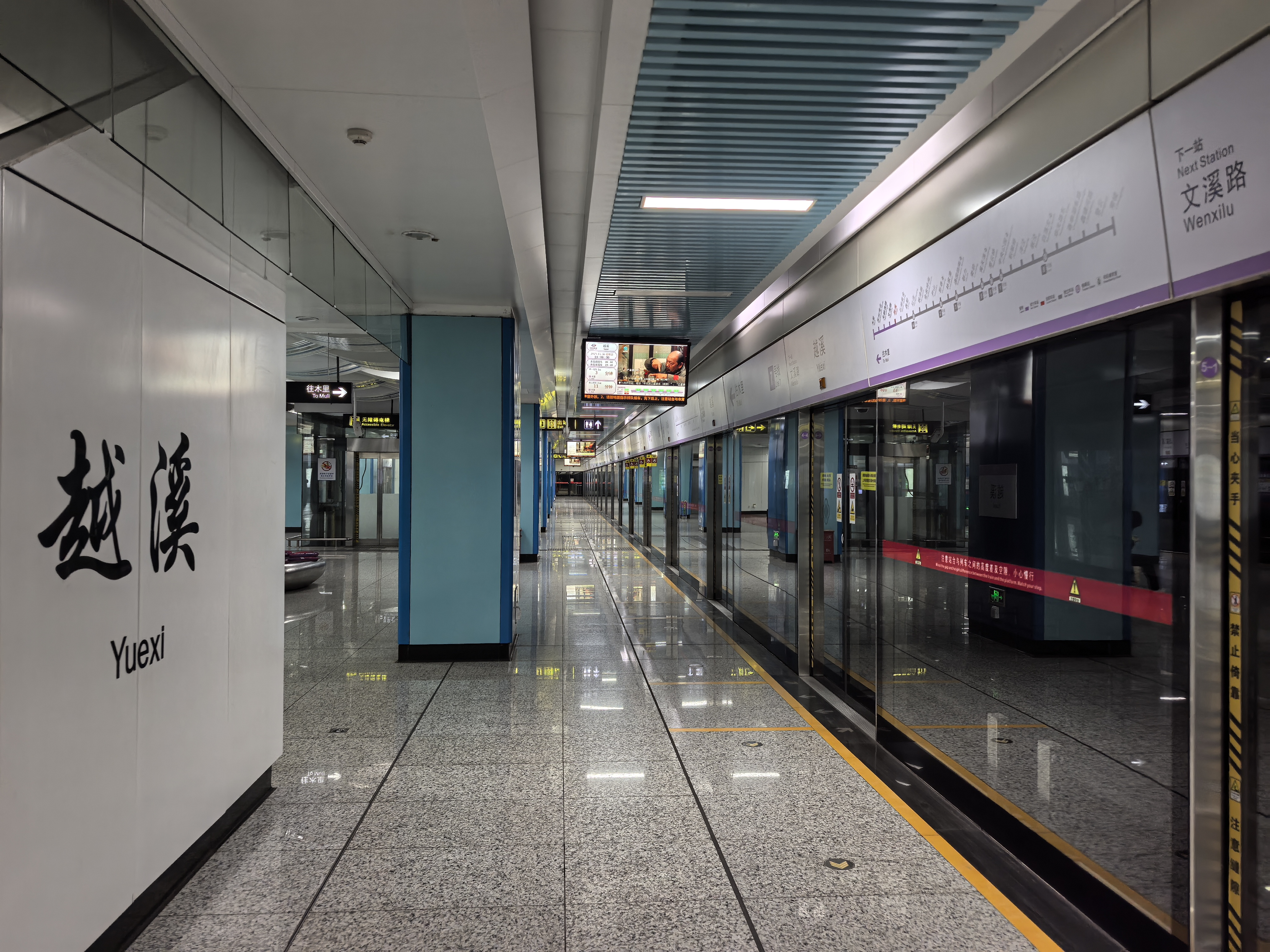
- Platform (to Muli)

General information
- Location: Tayun Road × Beixijiang Road/Nanxijiang Road; Wuzhong District, Suzhou, Jiangsu; China
- Coordinates: 31°13′04″N 120°35′31″E
- Operated by: Suzhou Rail Transit Co., Ltd
- Line: Line 7
- Platforms: 2 (1 island platform)

Construction
- Structure type: Underground

History
- Opened: April 15, 2017

Services
Preceding station	Suzhou Metro	Following station
Shihu Moshe towards Changlou	Line 7	Wenxi Lu towards Muli
Location

Yuexi (Chinese: 越溪) is a station on Line 7 of the Suzhou Metro. The station is located in the Wuzhong District of Suzhou. Prior to the opening of Line 7 in October 2024, the station formed part of the Line 4 Muli branch. It has been in use since April 15, 2017, when Line 4 first opened.
