= Shangfang =

Shangfang may refer to the following locations in China:

- Shangfang Mountain (Beijing) (上方山), in Fangshan District, with an elevation of 860 metres
- Shangfang Mountain (Suzhou) (上方山), Jiangsu
- Shangfang, Zhejiang (上方镇), town in Qujiang District, Quzhou
- Shangfang Township, Hebei (上方乡), in Xingtang County
- Shangfang Township, Jiangxi (上坊乡), in Wannian County

Shangfang also refer to:

- Petitioning (China)
