= Line 7 (Suzhou Metro) =

Metro line in Jiangsu, China

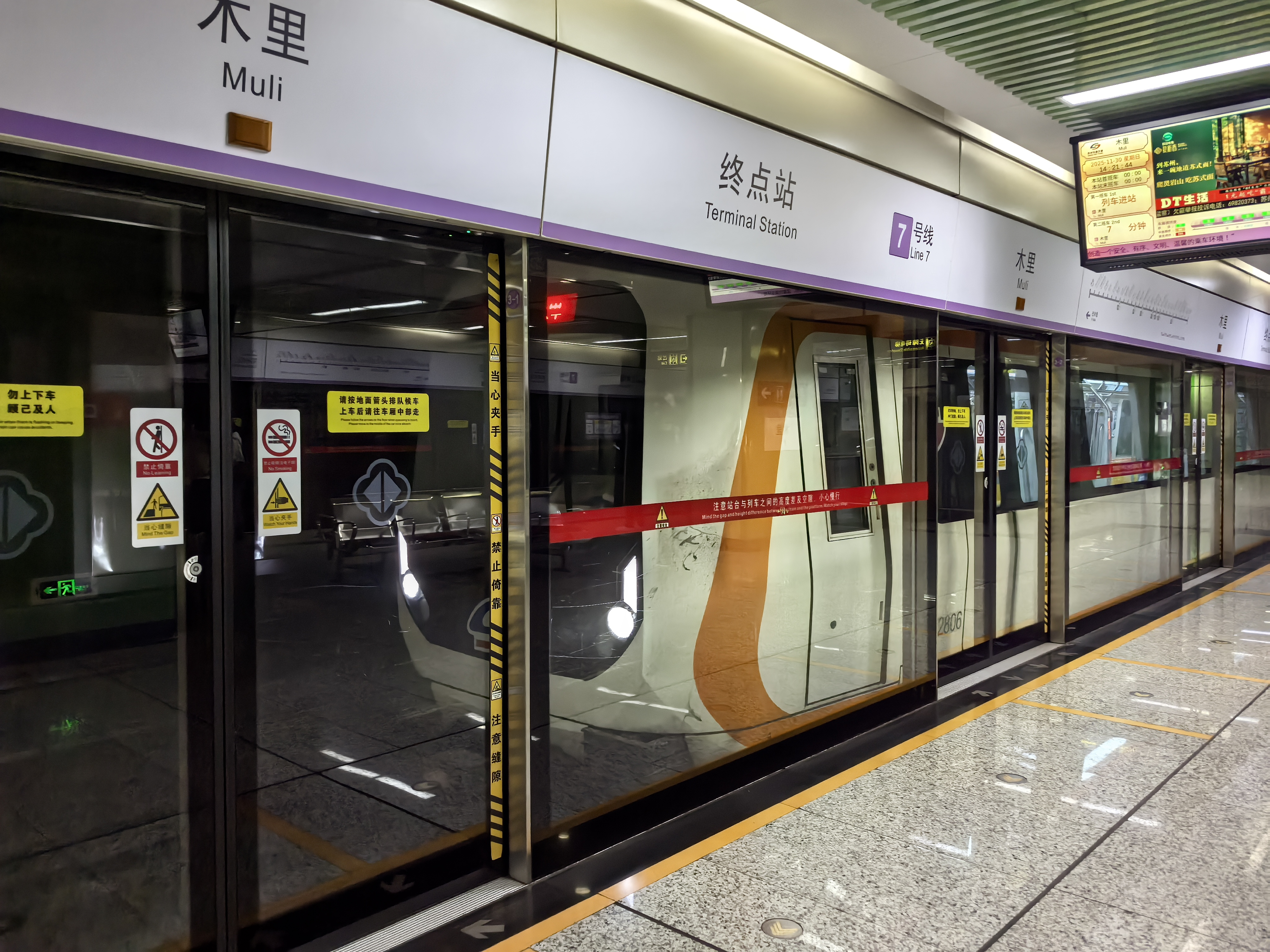
- A line 7 train entering Muli station

Overview
- Status: In operation (Moyang to Changlou is postponed, Chunqiulu to Moyang is under construction)
- Owner: Suzhou Rail Transit Co., Ltd
- Termini: Changlou; Muli
- Stations: 28

Service
- Type: Rapid transit
- System: Suzhou Metro
- Operator(s): Suzhou Rail Transit Co., Ltd

Technical
- Line length: 35.2 km
- Track gauge: 1,435 mm (4 ft 8 1/2 in)

Line 7 of the Suzhou Metro is north-south rapid transit line in Suzhou. Construction started on December 25, 2019. Changlou - Hongzhuang section started operation on December 1, 2024, but the operation of Moyang - Changlou section is postponed due to the construction of Suzhou North railway station.

The section between Hongzhuang and Muli stations was previously operated as branch line of Line 4. The combined line will be 40.6 km long. In addition, a 4-station, 7.11 km northern extension from Moyang to Chunqiu Road started construction in May 2022, for an opening in 2026.

It has Tian'edang Yard (Chinese: 天鹅荡停车场) in use.

== Opening timeline ==
Segment	Commencement	Length	Station(s)	Name
Hongzhuang — Muli	15 April 2017	11.1 km (6.90 mi)	7	Phase 1 south section (taken over from line 4 branch)
Changlou — Hongzhuang	1 December 2024		20	Phase 1 middle section
Moyang — Changlou	2027?		4	Phase 1 north section
Baidang South	2027?		1	infill station

== Stations ==
Station name		Connections	Distance km		Location	Notes
English	Chinese	Connections	Distance km		Location	Notes
Chunqiulu	春秋路		-	0	Xiangcheng	Northern extension. Under construction
Chunguanglu	春光路		-		Xiangcheng	Northern extension. Under construction
Yongchanglu	永昌路				Xiangcheng	Northern extension. Under construction
Shiganglu	石港路				Xiangcheng	Northern extension. Under construction
Moyang	莫阳	4	-		Xiangcheng	Operation postponed
Zhujing	朱泾				Xiangcheng	Operation postponed
Suzhoubei Railway Station	高铁苏州北站	2 10			Xiangcheng	Operation postponed
Xuenan	雪南				Xiangcheng	Operation postponed
Changlou	常楼				Xiangcheng	
Dengyun	登云				Xiangcheng	
Litanghelu	蠡塘河路				Xiangcheng	
Chunshenhudonglu	春申湖东路				Xiangcheng	
Huayuanlu East	华元路东				Xiangcheng	
Baidang North	白荡北	8			Xiangcheng	
Baidang South	白荡南				Xiangcheng	
Banjing	板泾				SIP	
Yangjing	洋泾				SIP	
Jicuiqiao	积翠桥				SIP	
Central Park	中央公园	1			SIP	
Reyunqiao	惹云桥	6			SIP	
Huangtiandang	黄天荡	5			SIP	
Loufeng	娄葑				SIP	
Qunli	群力				SIP	
Tongyuanlu South	通园路南	3			SIP	
Linjiatan	林家潭				Wuzhong	
Guoxiang	郭巷	2			Wuzhong	
Yinshan	尹山				Wuzhong	
Jinjiaqiao South	金家桥南				Wuzhong	
Fengjinlu	枫津路				Wuzhong	
Hongzhuang	红庄	4			Wuzhong	
Lishu	蠡墅				Wuzhong	
Shihu Moshe	石湖莫舍				Wuzhong	
Yuexi	越溪				Wuzhong	
Wenxi Lu	文溪路				Wuzhong	
Tian'edang Lu	天鹅荡路				Wuzhong	
Suzhouwan North	苏州湾北				Wuzhong	
Muli	木里				Wuzhong	

== Rolling stock ==
Fleet numbers	Year built	Time in service	Builder	Class	Number in service	No of car	Assembly	Rolling stock	Number	Depots	Line assigned	Notes
396 (66 sets)	2023-2025 (planned)	N/A	CRRC Nanjing Puzhen	B	Never built	6	Tc+Mp+M - M + Mp+Tc	PM227	070101-076606 (0701-0766)	None	7 (planned)	The order scrapped in February 2023.
300 (50 sets)	2023-2025 (Note: Cars modified under contract PM259.)	2024-present	CRRC Nanjing Puzhen	B	132 (22 sets)	6	Tc+Mp+M - M + Mp+Tc	PM259	070101-075006 (0701-0750)	Tian'Edang Yard; Songling Depot; Yuanhe Yard	7	Converted from PM101, PM102 and PM116.
