= Donghai County =

Donghai 东海县 Tunghai
- County
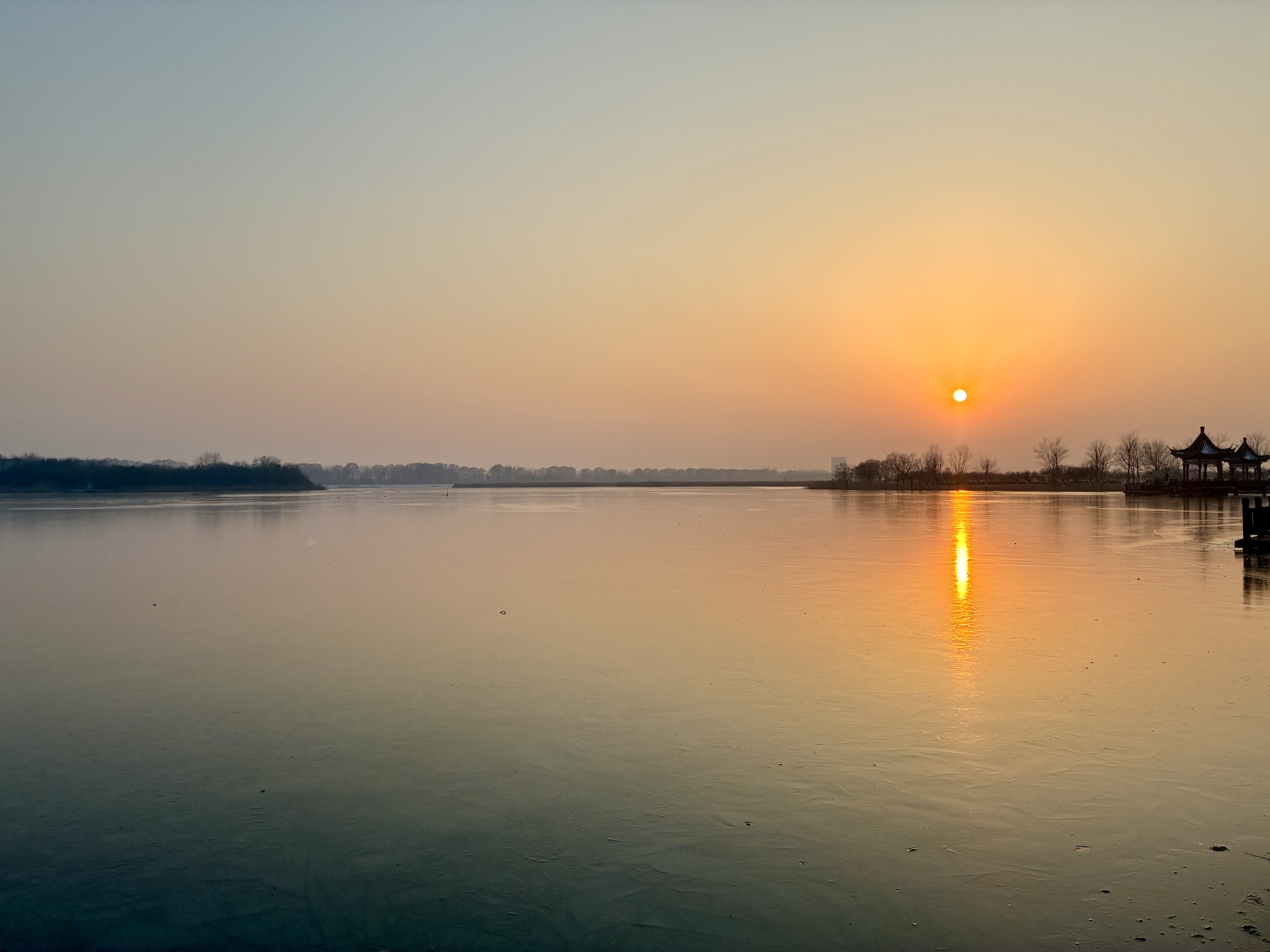

- Location in Jiangsu
- Coordinates: 34°33′07″N 118°45′47″E
- Country: People's Republic of China
- Province: Jiangsu
- Prefecture-level city: Lianyungang

Area
  - County: 2,037 km^{2} (786 sq mi)

Population (2020)
  - County: 1,047,357
  - Density: 514.2/km^{2} (1,332/sq mi)
  - Urban: 506,989
  - Rural: 540,368
- Time zone: UTC+8 (China Standard)
- Postal code: 222300

Donghai County (simplified Chinese: 东海县; traditional Chinese: 東海縣; pinyin: Dōnghǎi Xiàn; lit. 'east sea') is under the administration of Lianyungang, Jiangsu province, China. It borders the prefecture-level cities of Linyi (Shandong) to the north and Xuzhou to the west.

The county has 300 million tons of quartz and 300,000 tons of rock crystal reserves, which is the highest in China, so it is nicknamed "the county of rock crystal".

The crystal coffin of pre-president of China, Mao Zedong was unearthed here.

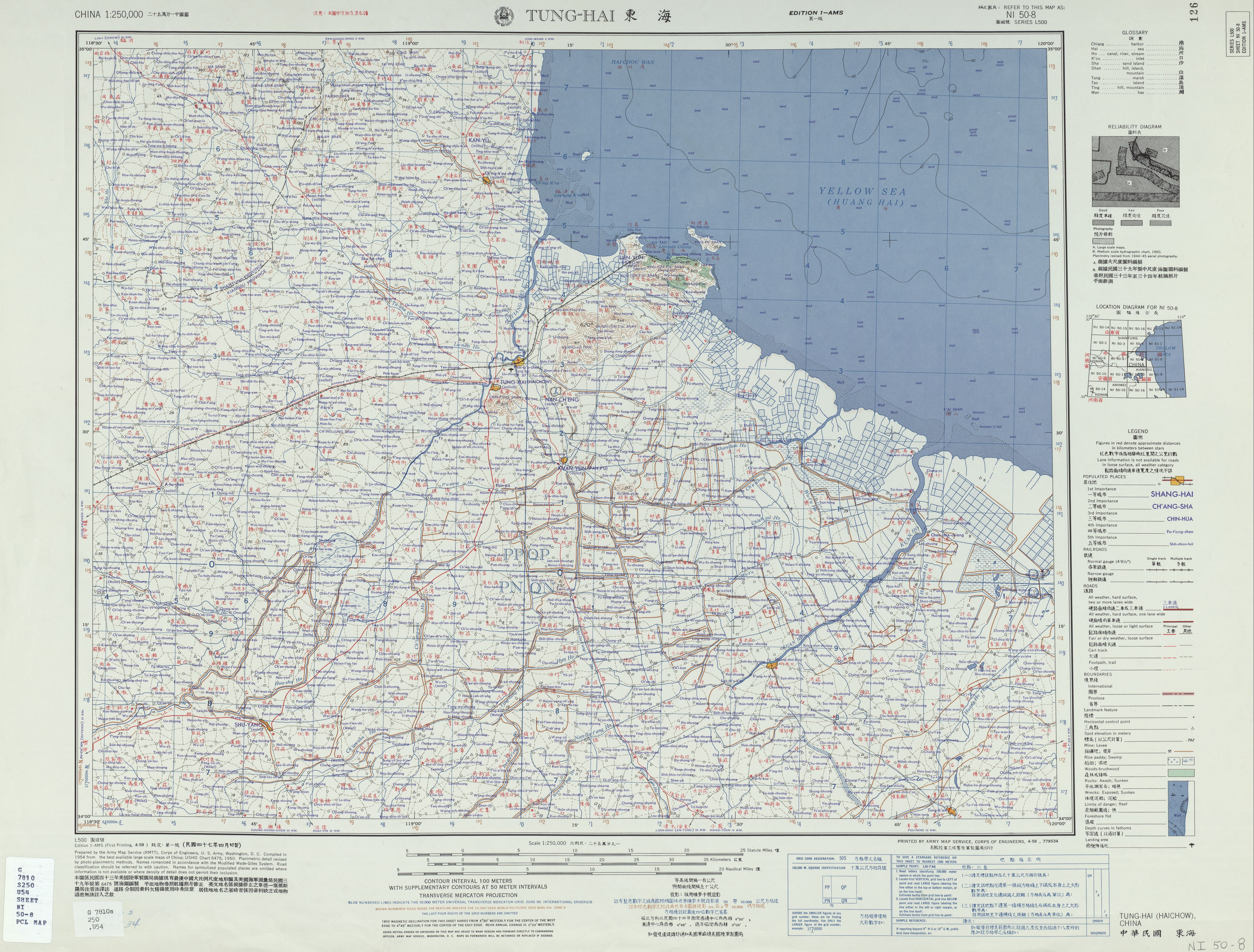
Donghai (labelled of TUNG-HAI (HAICHOW) 東海) (1954)

== Administrative divisions ==
At present, Donghai County has 2 subdistricts, 11 towns and 8 townships.

2 subdistricts

- Niushan (牛山街道)
- Shiliu (石榴街道)

11 towns

- Baitabu (白塔埠镇)
- Huangchuan (黄川镇)
- Taolin (桃林镇)
- Qinghu (青湖镇)
- Wenquan (温泉镇)
- Shuangdian (双店镇)
- Shilianghe (石梁河镇)
- Hongzhuang (洪庄镇)
- Anfeng (安峰镇)
- Fangshan (房山镇)
- Pingming (平明镇)

8 townships

- Tuofeng (驼峰乡)
- Shanzuokou (山左口乡)
- Henggou (横沟乡)
- Linian (李埝乡)
- Nanchen (南辰乡)
- Shihu (石湖乡)
- Quyang (曲阳乡)
- Zhangwan (张湾乡)

== Climate ==
Climate data for Donghai, elevation 33 m (108 ft), (1991–2020 normals, extremes 1981–2010)
Month	Jan	Feb	Mar	Apr	May	Jun	Jul	Aug	Sep	Oct	Nov	Dec	Year
Record high °C (°F)	16.9 (62.4)	24.8 (76.6)	27.7 (81.9)	33.3 (91.9)	37.1 (98.8)	38.4 (101.1)	38.9 (102.0)	37.1 (98.8)	34.5 (94.1)	33.3 (91.9)	27.4 (81.3)	19.3 (66.7)	38.9 (102.0)
Mean daily maximum °C (°F)	5.2 (41.4)	8.3 (46.9)	13.9 (57.0)	20.4 (68.7)	25.7 (78.3)	29.5 (85.1)	30.9 (87.6)	30.1 (86.2)	26.6 (79.9)	21.6 (70.9)	14.3 (57.7)	7.4 (45.3)	19.5 (67.1)
Daily mean °C (°F)	0.4 (32.7)	3.1 (37.6)	8.1 (46.6)	14.5 (58.1)	20.1 (68.2)	24.3 (75.7)	26.8 (80.2)	26.1 (79.0)	21.8 (71.2)	16.1 (61.0)	9.1 (48.4)	2.5 (36.5)	14.4 (57.9)
Mean daily minimum °C (°F)	−3.4 (25.9)	−1.0 (30.2)	3.4 (38.1)	9.3 (48.7)	15.1 (59.2)	19.9 (67.8)	23.6 (74.5)	23.0 (73.4)	17.9 (64.2)	11.6 (52.9)	4.8 (40.6)	−1.4 (29.5)	10.2 (50.4)
Record low °C (°F)	−12.7 (9.1)	−13.0 (8.6)	−7.8 (18.0)	−0.9 (30.4)	4.9 (40.8)	12.0 (53.6)	16.8 (62.2)	13.1 (55.6)	7.6 (45.7)	0.6 (33.1)	−6.7 (19.9)	−13.1 (8.4)	−13.1 (8.4)
Average precipitation mm (inches)	19.3 (0.76)	23.7 (0.93)	34.4 (1.35)	43.0 (1.69)	72.7 (2.86)	109.6 (4.31)	216.9 (8.54)	195.8 (7.71)	87.0 (3.43)	35.5 (1.40)	32.9 (1.30)	19.4 (0.76)	890.2 (35.04)
Average precipitation days (≥ 0.1 mm)	4.3	5.0	5.8	6.7	7.9	7.9	13.3	11.9	7.8	5.7	5.4	4.2	85.9
Average snowy days	2.8	2.8	1.2	0.1	0	0	0	0	0	0	0.5	1.6	9
Average relative humidity (%)	67	66	63	64	68	72	82	84	79	71	69	67	71
Mean monthly sunshine hours	157.0	153.7	195.5	216.2	226.8	187.3	179.4	186.6	183.9	187.1	159.8	162.5	2,195.8
Percentage possible sunshine	50	49	52	55	52	43	41	45	50	54	52	53	50
Source: China Meteorological Administration
