= Shihu Moshe station =

Suzhou Metro station

Shihu Moshe 石湖莫舍
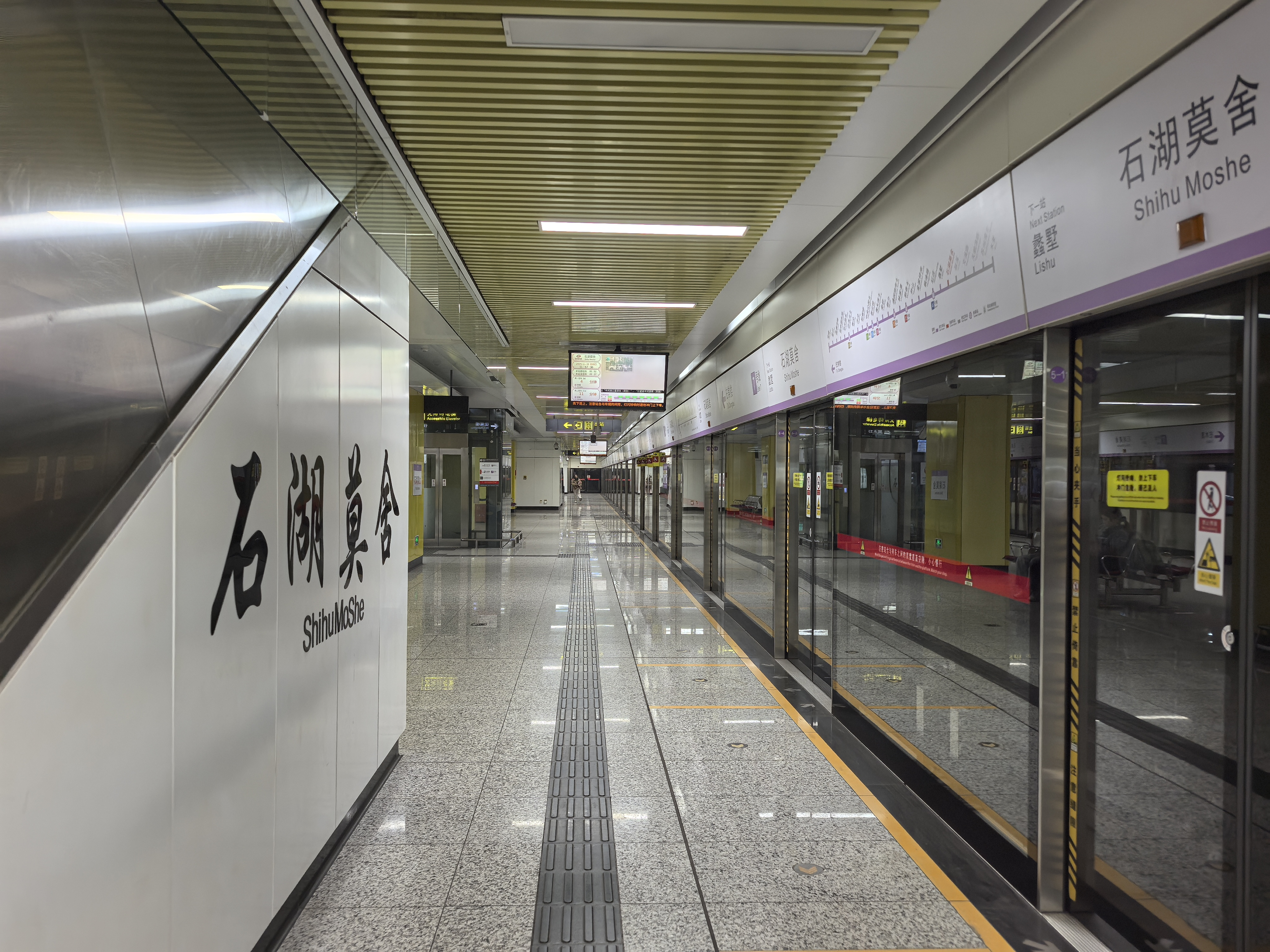
- Platform (to Changlou)

General information
- Location: Wuzhong Avenue × Beixijiang Road; Wuzhong District, Suzhou, Jiangsu; China
- Coordinates: 31°13′36″N 120°36′00″E
- Operated by: Suzhou Rail Transit Co., Ltd
- Line: Line 7
- Platforms: 2 (1 island platform)

Construction
- Structure type: Underground

History
- Opened: April 15, 2017

Services
Preceding station	Suzhou Metro	Following station
Lishu towards Changlou	Line 7	Yuexi towards Muli
Location

Shihu Moshe (Chinese: 石湖莫舍) is a station on Line 7 of the Suzhou Metro. The station is located in the Wuzhong District of Suzhou. Prior to the opening of Line 7 in October 2024, the station formed part of the Line 4 Muli branch. It has been in use since April 15, 2017, when Line 4 first opened.
