= Shihu Donglu station =

Suzhou Metro station

Shihu Donglu 石湖东路
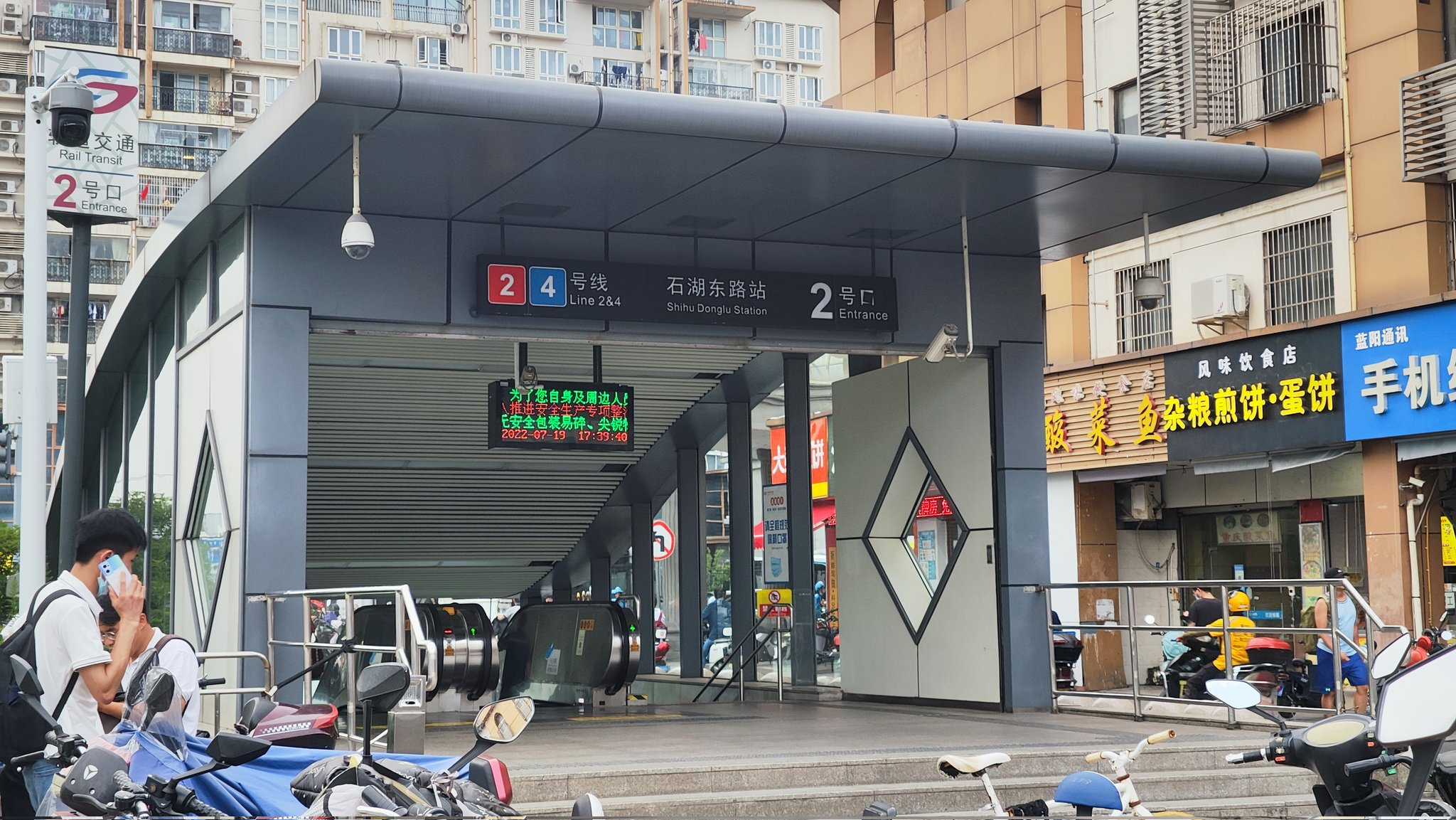

General information
- Location: Shihu East Road × Dongwu South Road; Wuzhong District, Suzhou, Jiangsu; China
- Coordinates: 31°15′18″N 120°37′31″E
- Operated by: Suzhou Rail Transit Co., Ltd
- Lines: Line 2 Line 4
- Platforms: 4 (2 island platforms)

Construction
- Structure type: Underground

History
- Opened: December 28, 2013

Services
| Preceding station | Suzhou Metro | Following station |
|---|---|---|
| Xinjia Qiao towards Qihe | Line 2 | Baodaiqiao South towards Sangtiandao |
| Baodai Lu towards Longdaobang | Line 4 | Hongzhuang towards Tongli |
Location

Shihu Donglu Station (Chinese: 石湖东路站) is a station of Line 2 and Line 4 of the Suzhou Metro. The station is located in Wuzhong District of Suzhou. It started service on December 28, 2013, when Line 2 first opened.
