= Shihu Township, Jiangsu =

Shihu Township 石湖乡
- Township
- Location in Jiangsu
- Coordinates: 34°29′26″N 119°39′46″E
- Country: People's Republic of China
- Province: Jiangsu
- Prefecture-level city: Lianyungang
- County: Donghai County
- Time zone: UTC+8 (China Standard)

Shihu Township (simplified Chinese: 石湖乡; traditional Chinese: 石湖鄉; pinyin: Shíhú Xiāng) is a township in Donghai County, Jiangsu, China. As of 2020, it administers the following eleven villages:

- Shihu Village
- Dalou Village (大娄村)
- Liaotang Village (廖塘村)
- Chizhuang Village (池庄村)
- Qiaotuan Village (乔团村)
- Youzhuang Village (尤庄村)
- Tuanchi Village (团池村)
- Hezhuang Village (贺庄村)
- Shuiku Village (水库村)
- Huangtang Village (黄塘村)
- Youtang Village (尤塘村)
