= Shi Hu (artist) =

Chinese artist

Shi Hu (Chinese: 石虎; pinyin: Shí Hǔ; born 1942), early name Shi Chenghu, is an established modern Chinese artist. He was born in Xushui County, Hebei. He studied at the Beijing College of Art and Design and at the Zhejiang Academy of Art. His painting style led some to call him "Picasso of the East".
