= Sihu =

Sihu may refer to:

- Sihu (instrument), Chinese bowed string instrument
- Four hu, a way of classifying Chinese syllable finals
- Sihu, Jiangsu (四户镇), town in Pizhou City, Jiangsu, PR China
- Sihu, Changhua (溪湖鎮), or Xihu, town in Changhua County, Taiwan
- Sihu, Miaoli (西湖鄉), or Xihu, township in Miaoli County, Taiwan
- Sihu, Yunlin (四湖鄉), township in Yunlin County, Taiwan
