= Shangfang Mountain (Suzhou) =

Mountain in Jiangsu, China

Shangfang Mountain 上方山

Highest point
- Coordinates: 31°14′44″N 120°34′44″E

Geography
- Location: Suzhou, Jiangsu Province, China

Shangfang Mountain (Chinese: 上方山; pinyin: ShàngFāng shān) is a small mountain located in southwest of Suzhou near Shihu Lake. It's also a part of Shangfang Mountain National Forest Park. It is famous for Wu and Yue ruins.
