= Lake Shi =

- 石湖 (Chinese)
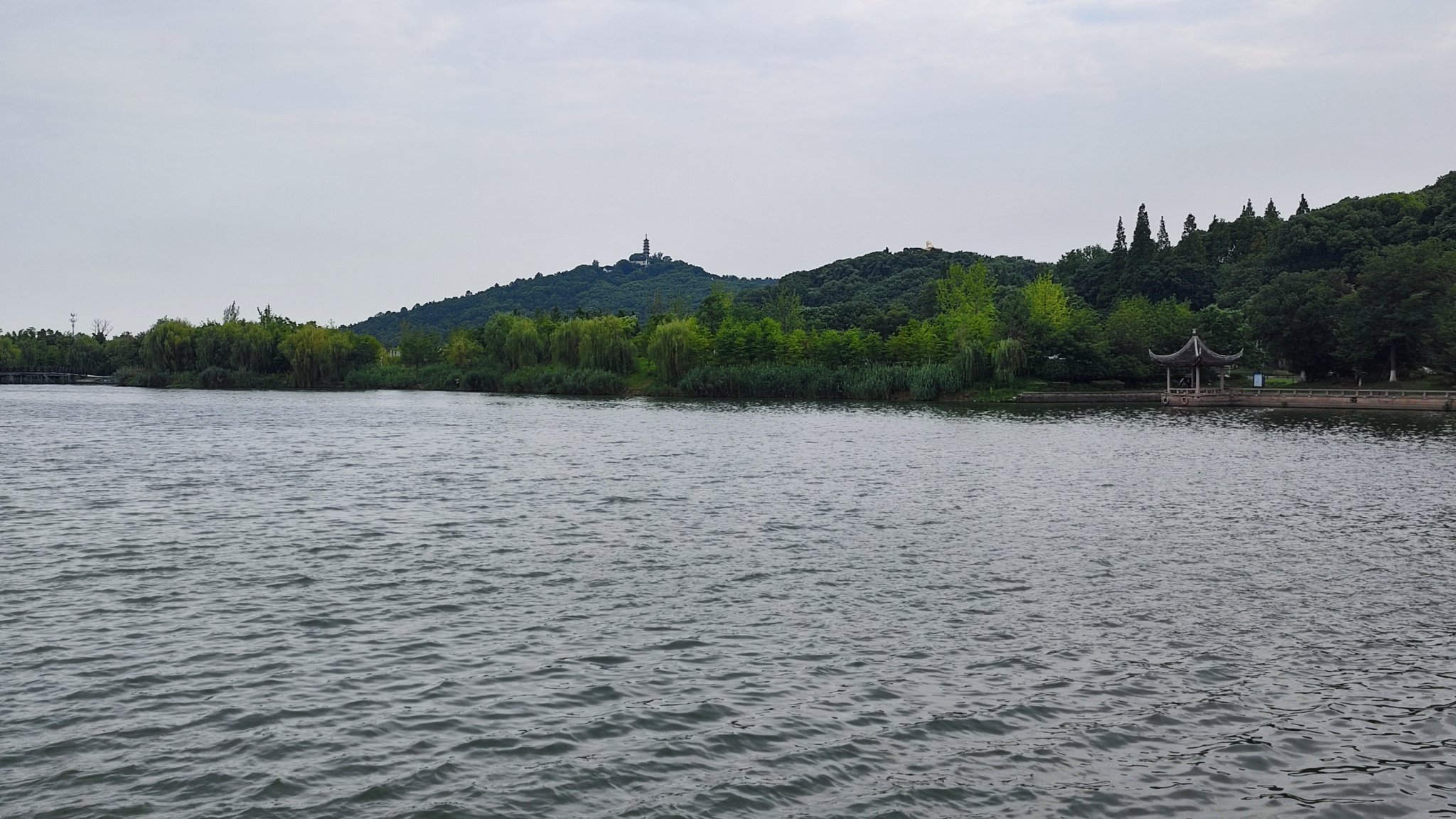
- Lakeshore

- Location within Jiangsu
- Location: Wuzhong District, Suzhou, Jiangsu
- Coordinates: 31.246°N 120.591°E
- Type: Fresh water lake
- Basin countries: China
- Surface area: 3.6 km^{2} (1.4 sq mi)
- Settlements: Suzhou

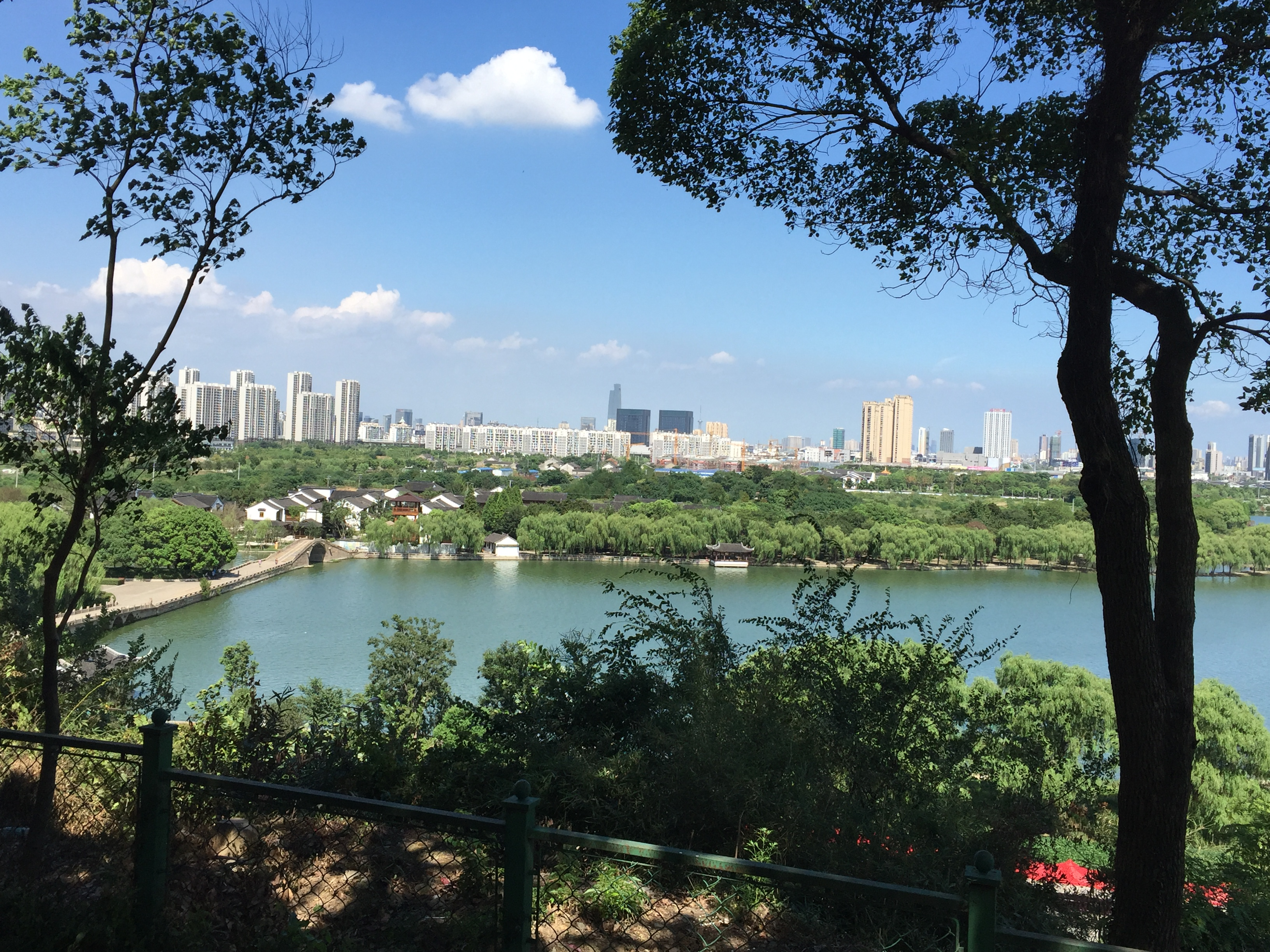
Lake Shi shoot from a high vantage point

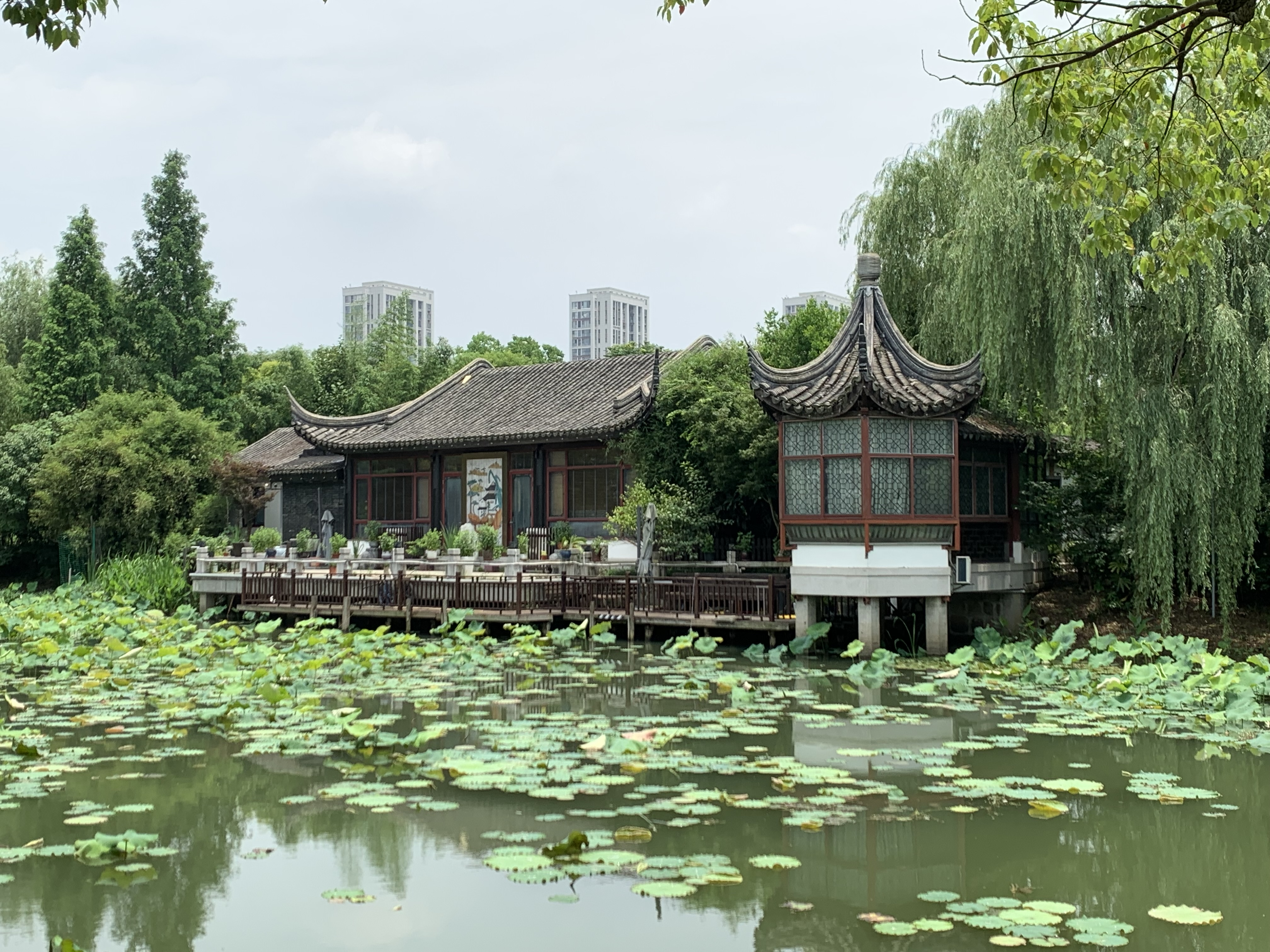
Lake Shi shoot from a high vantage point

Lake Shi (Chinese: 石湖; pinyin: Shí Hú) or Shi Hu, literally Stone Lake, is a fresh water lake located in the southeast of Suzhou, Jiangsu Province. It is closed to Shangfang Mountain, which is a national forest park of China. The most famous spot of it is "Lake Shi String of Moons" (石湖串月) on August 17 of the Chinese calendar, when nine reflections of the moon appear in a line. Lake Shi was a bay of the Lake Tai in ancient times.

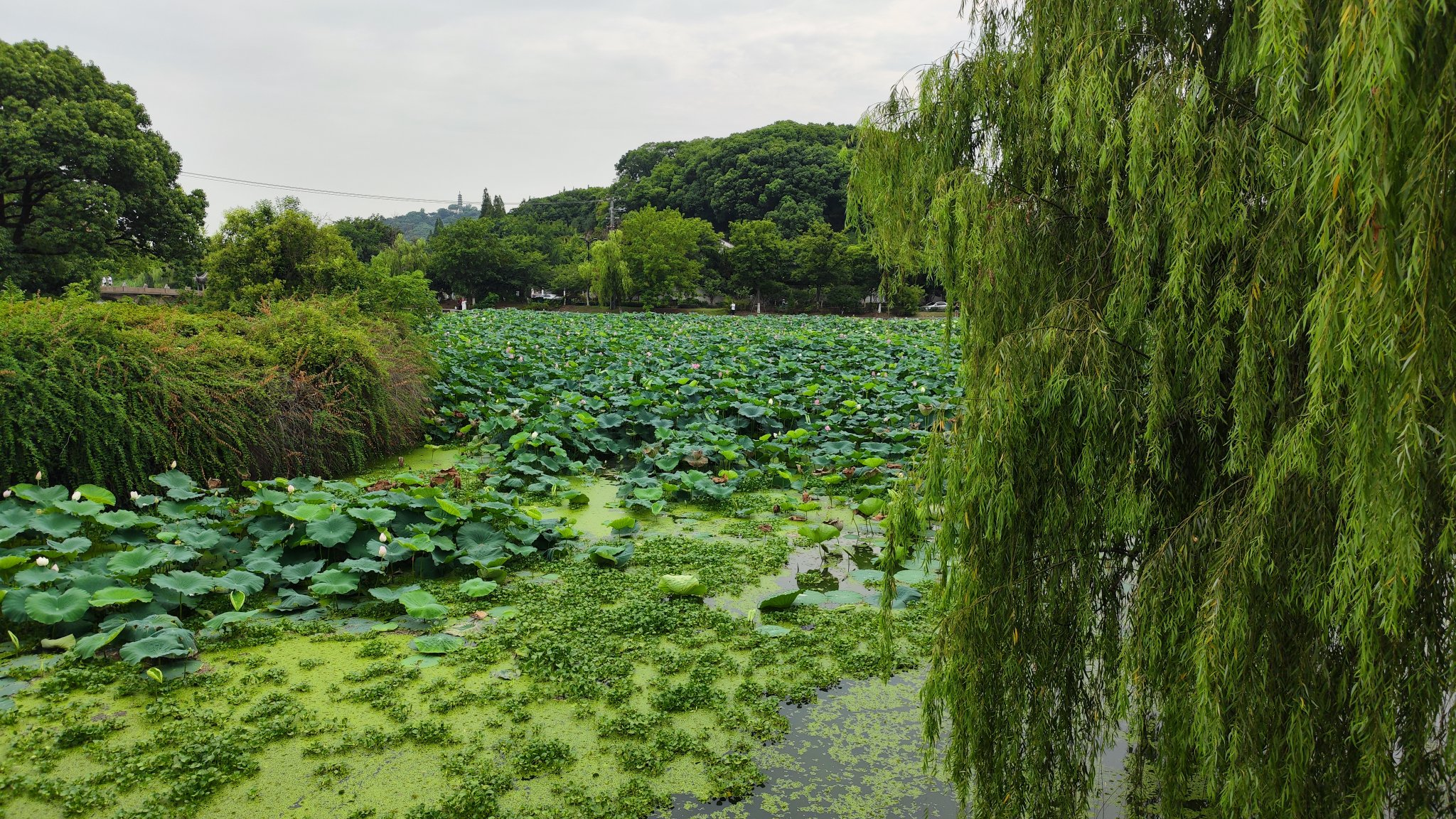
Lotus Pond

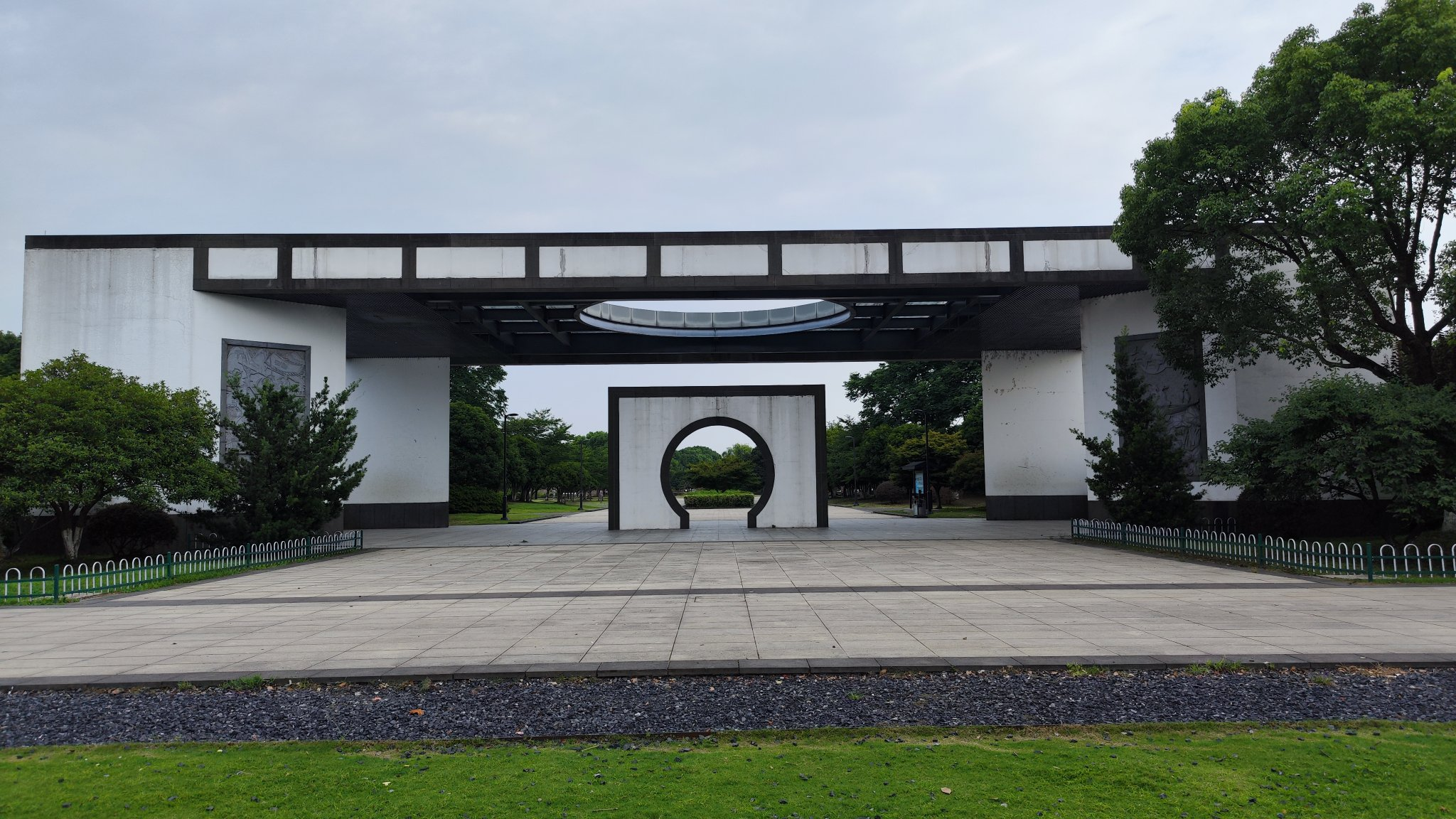
Park Entrance

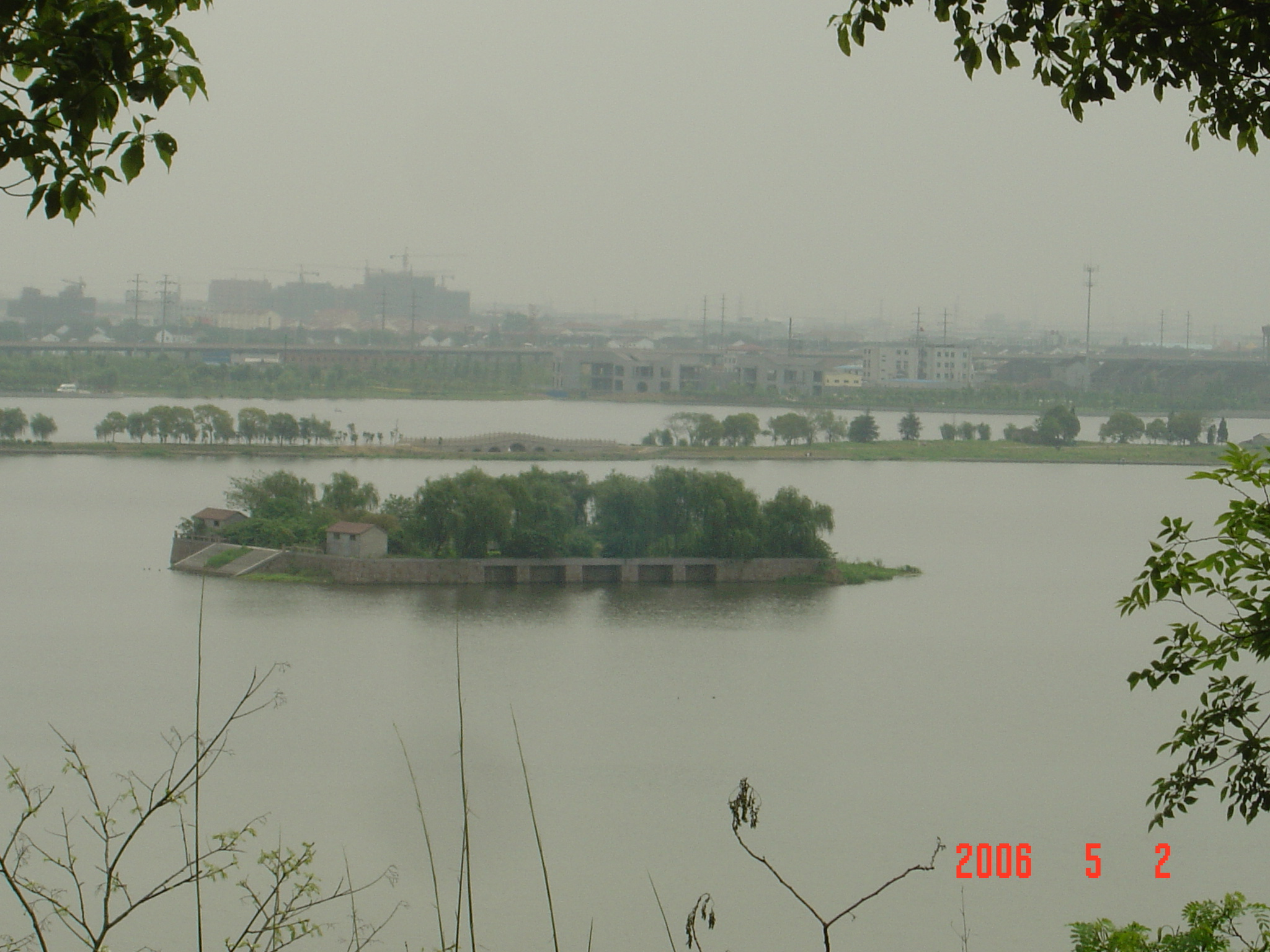
Island photographed in 2006

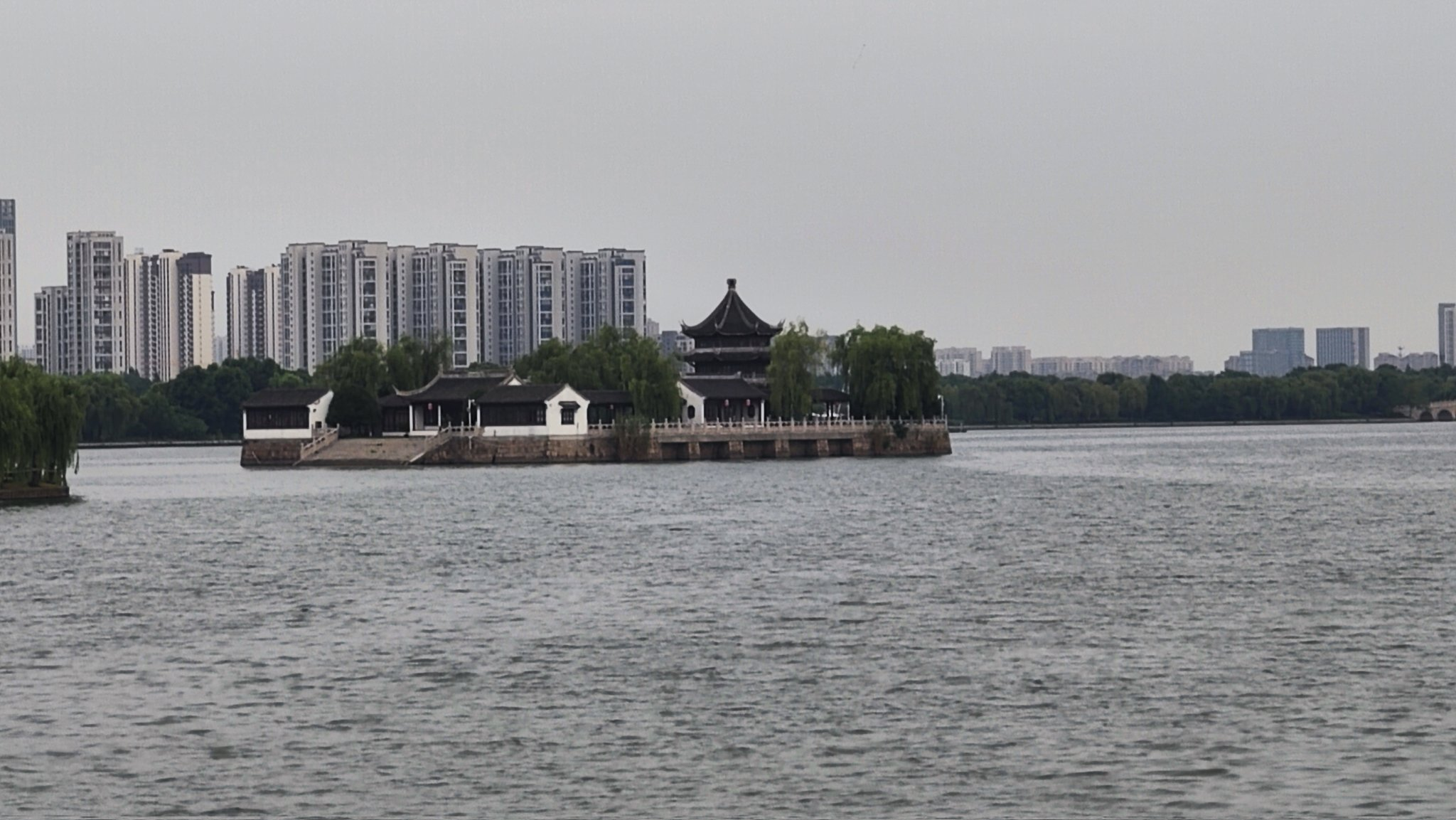
Same Island, photographed in 2022
