= Weiting station =

Suzhou Metro station

Weiting 唯亭
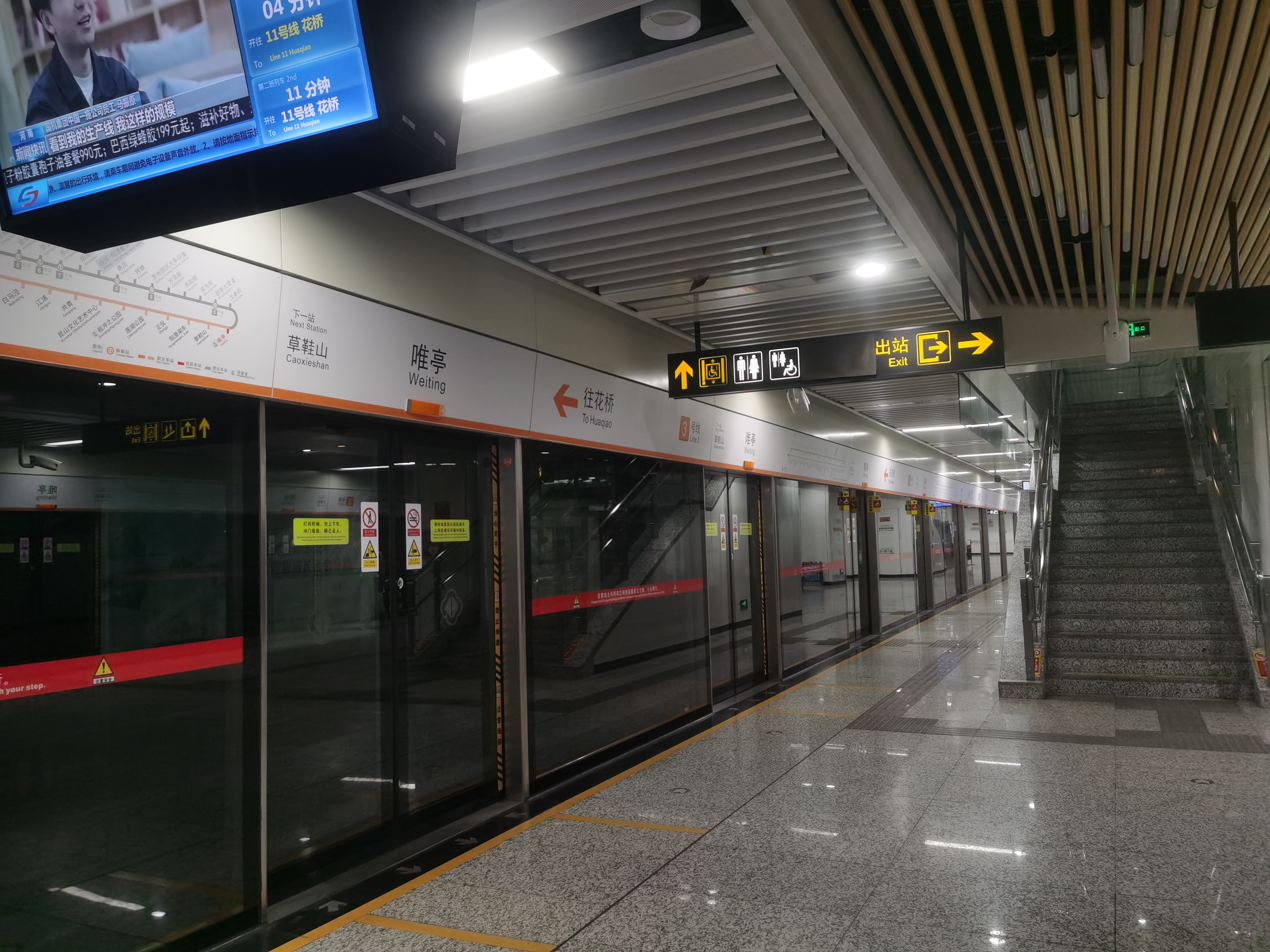
- Line 3 platform

General information
- Location: Fengting Dadao (葑亭大道) × Yiting Lu (夷亭路); Suzhou Industrial Park, Suzhou, Jiangsu; China
- Coordinates: 31°21′59″N 120°47′05″E
- System: Suzhou Metro
- Operated by: Suzhou Rail Transit Co., Ltd
- Lines: Line 3 Line 11
- Platforms: 2 (1 island platform) (Note: Actually two island platforms, but just one in use.)

Construction
- Structure type: Underground
- Accessible: Yes

History
- Opened: Line 3: December 25, 2019; Line 11: June 24, 2023
- Closed: December 16, 2023 (Line 11 platform)

Services
Preceding station	Suzhou Metro	Following station
Gexiangjie towards Suzhou Xinqu Railway Station	Line 3	through to Line 11
through to Line 3	Line 11	Caoxieshan towards Huaqiao
Location

Weiting station (Chinese: 唯亭) is the eastern terminus of Line 3 of the Suzhou Metro and, upon opening, was designated the western terminus of Line 11. The through-service of Lines 3 and 11 have since rendered the Line 11 platform obsolete, and as of December 2023, it is no longer considered a Line 11 station, nor a transfer station between the two lines.
