= Muli station =

Suzhou Metro station

Muli 木里
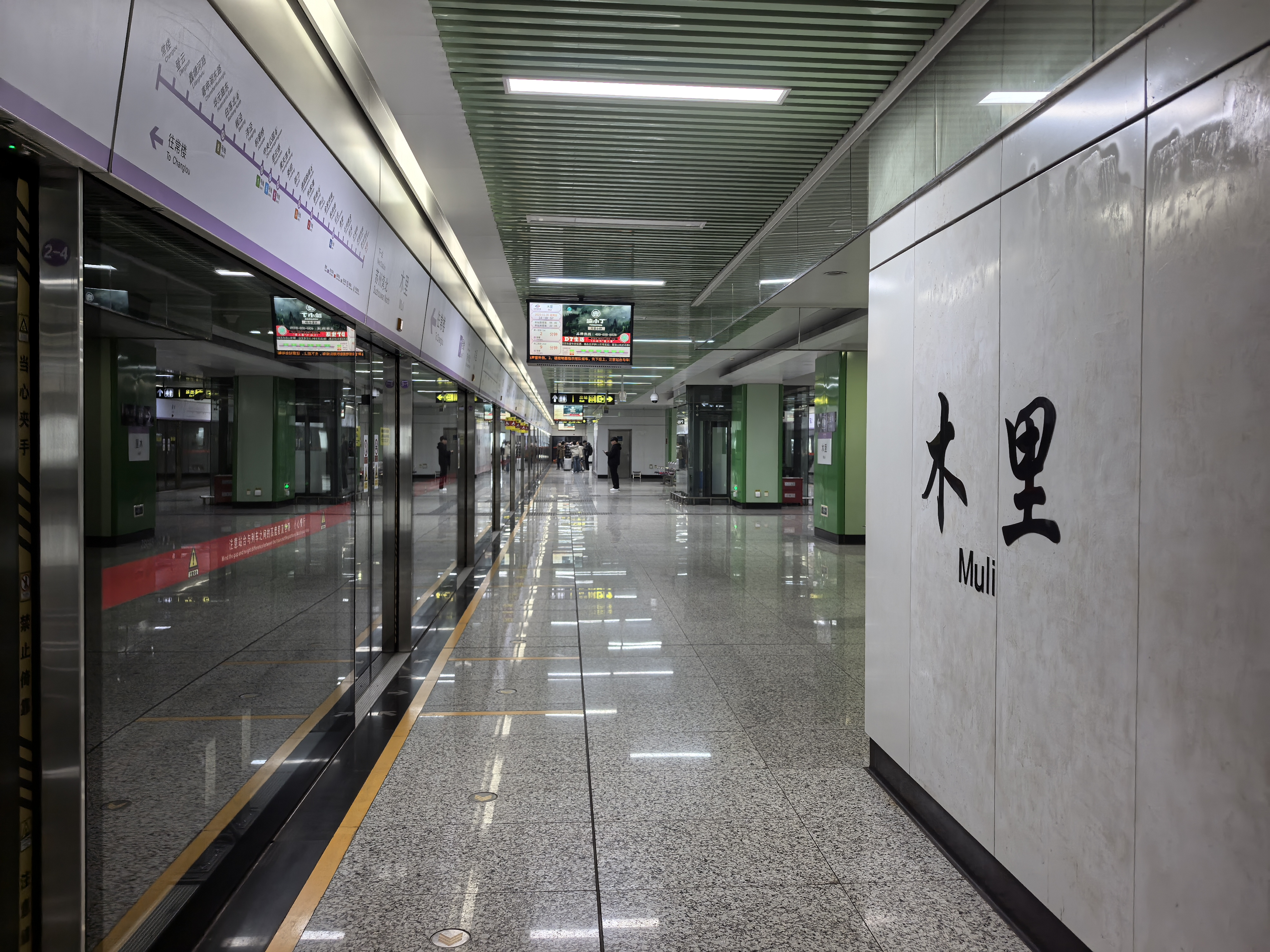
- Platform (to Changlou)

General information
- Location: Dongtaihu Road × Lianzhushan Road; Wuzhong District, Suzhou, Jiangsu; China
- Coordinates: 31°11′N 120°34′E
- Operated by: Suzhou Rail Transit Co., Ltd
- Line: Line 7
- Platforms: 2 (1 island platform)

Construction
- Structure type: Underground

History
- Opened: April 15, 2017

Services
Preceding station	Suzhou Metro	Following station
Suzhouwan North towards Changlou	Line 7	Terminus
Location

Muli (Chinese: 木里) is the southern terminus station of Line 7 of the Suzhou Metro. The station is located in the Wuzhong District of Suzhou. Prior to the opening of Line 7 in October 2024, it was the terminus of the Line 4 Muli branch. It has been in use since April 15, 2017, when Line 4 first opened.
