= Lingyan Mountain =

Mountain in Suzhou, Jiangsu, China

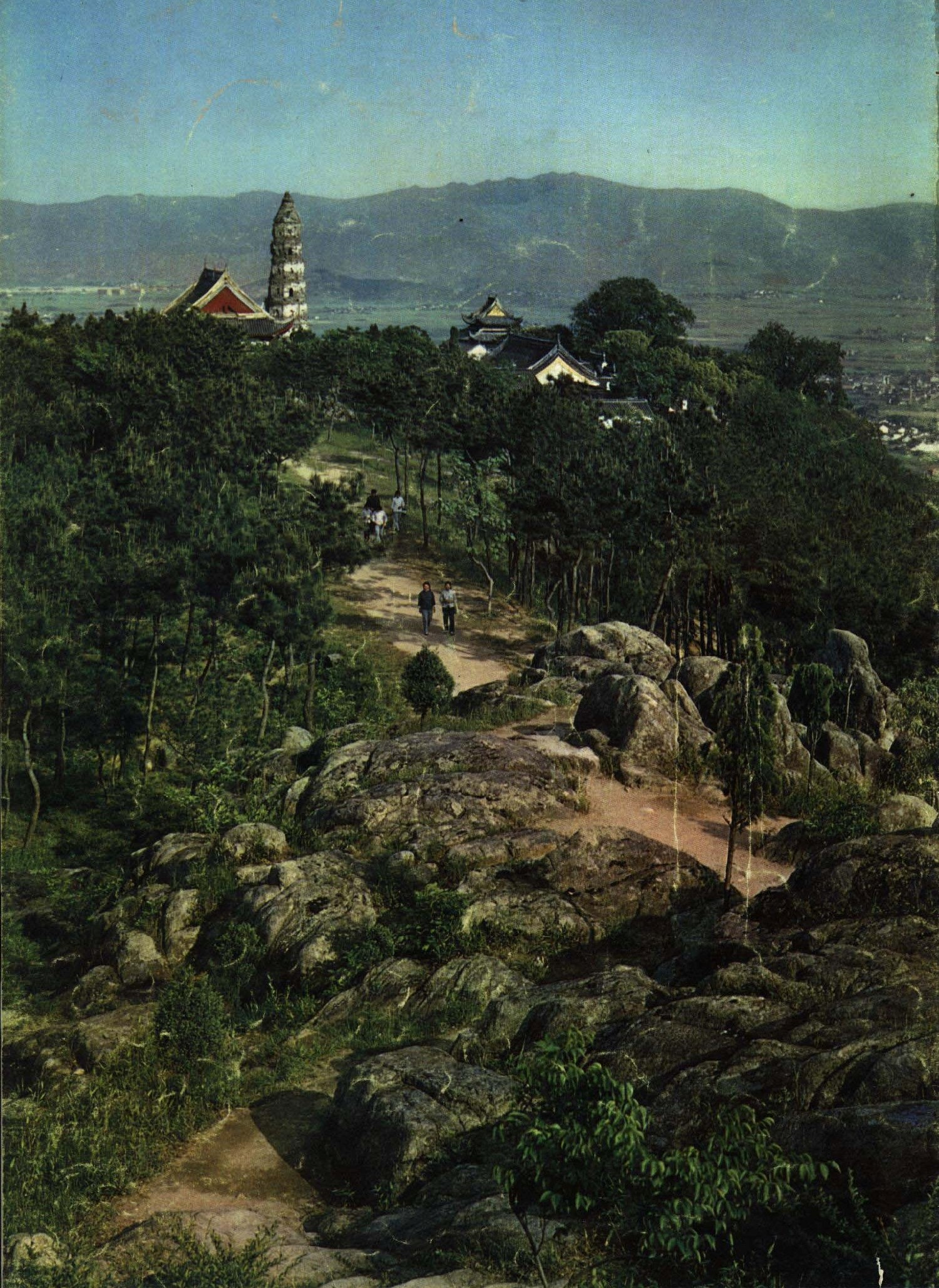
Lingyan Mountain (circa 1965)

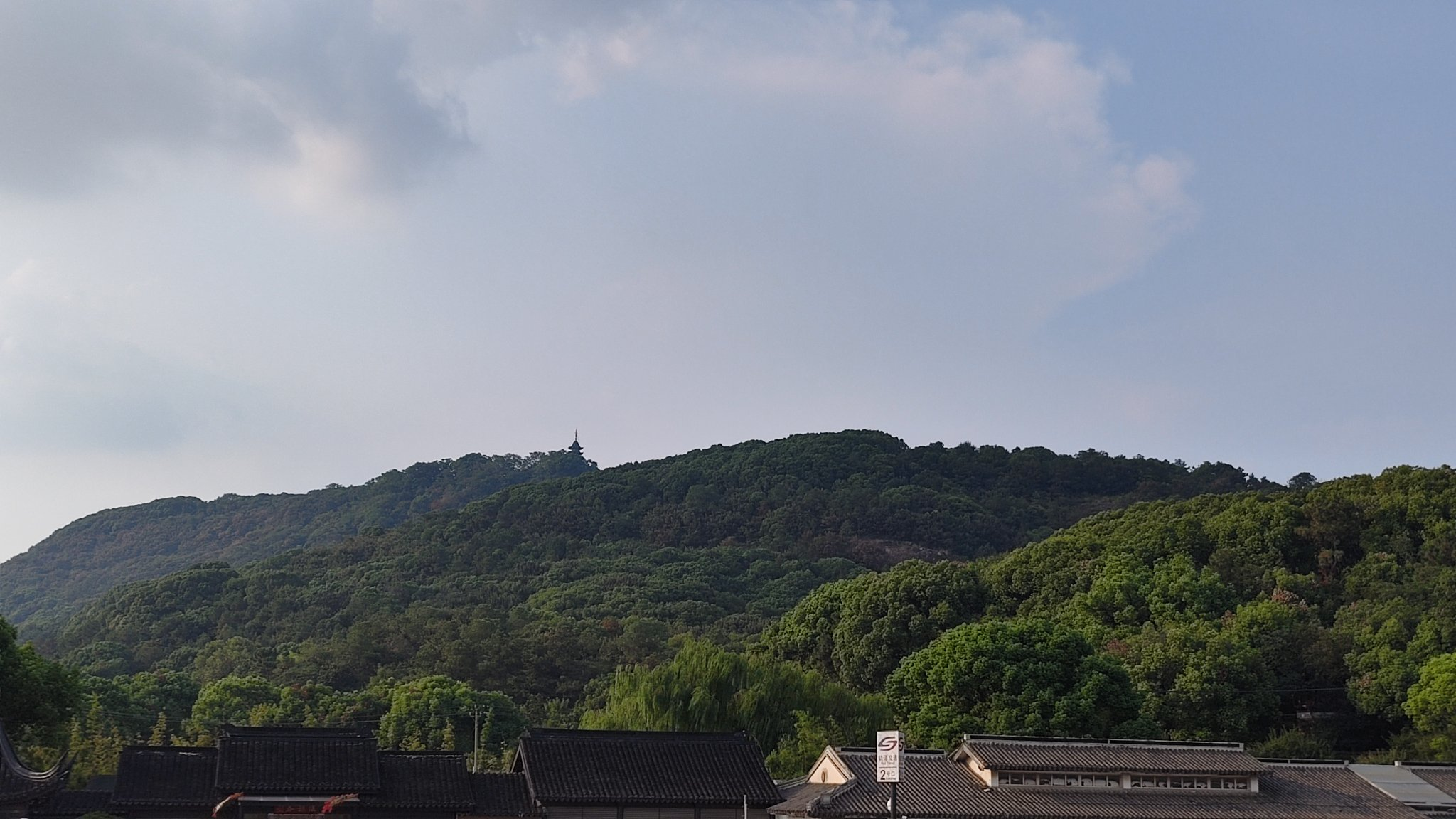
Lingyan Mountain viewed from Mudu

Lingyan Mountain (Chinese: 灵岩山; pinyin: Língyán Shān) is located in western Mudu town in the Wuzhong District of Suzhou, Jiangsu, China. It is famous for an abundance of Yuhua Stones. There are various animals on and around the mountain. There are several Buddhist temples on the top of the mountain. Every year, visitors from all over China come to view the landscape and sika deer.

Since June 2021, the mountain has been served by Lingyanshan station of the Suzhou Metro Line 5.
