= Lingyanshan station =

Suzhou Metro station

Lingyanshan 灵岩山
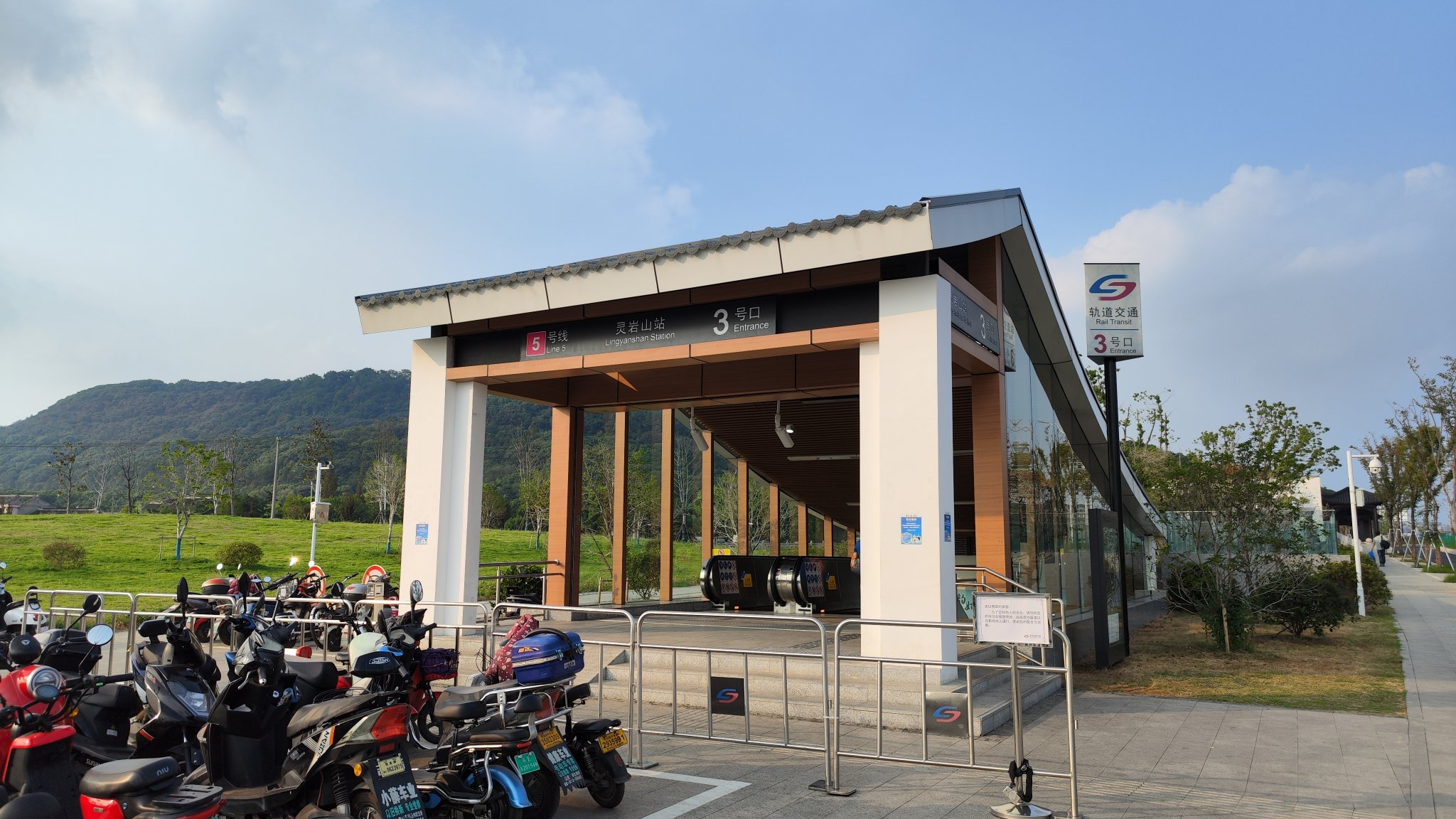

General information
- Location: Wuzhong District, Suzhou, Jiangsu; China
- Operated by: Suzhou Rail Transit Co., Ltd
- Line: Line 5
- Platforms: 2 (1 island platform)

Construction
- Structure type: Underground

History
- Opened: June 29, 2021

Services
Preceding station	Suzhou Metro	Following station
Xujiaqiao towards Taihu Xiangshan	Line 5	Duchuanqiao towards Yangchenghu South
Location

Lingyanshan Station (Chinese: 灵岩山) is a station on Line 5 of the Suzhou Metro. The station is located on the edge of Mudu Town, Wuzhong District, Jiangsu. It has been in use since June 29, 2021, when Line 5 first opened to the public.

The station is named after the nearby Lingyan Mountain which, along with Mudu Town itself, is a popular tourist site.

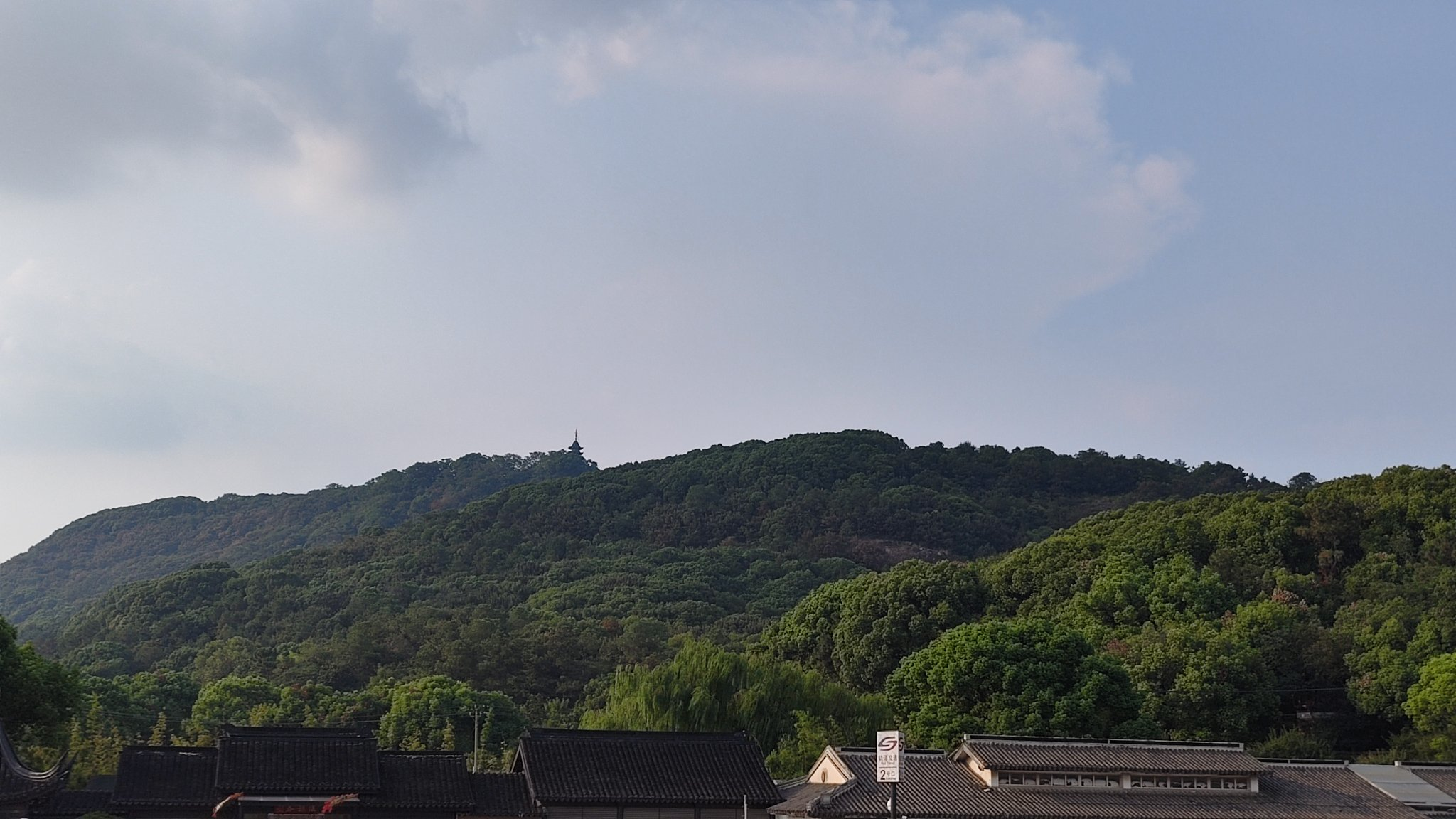
Lingyan Mountain viewed from station entrance
