= Tianping rolling stock depot =

Tianping rolling stock depot (simplified Chinese: 天平车辆段; traditional Chinese: 天平車輛段) is the rolling stock depot of Line 1 of the Suzhou Metro. It is located in Tianping Village, Mudu Town, Wuzhong District, Suzhou. The depot opens to public occasionally.
