= Jinqiao station (Suzhou Metro) =

Suzhou Metro station

Jinqiao 津桥
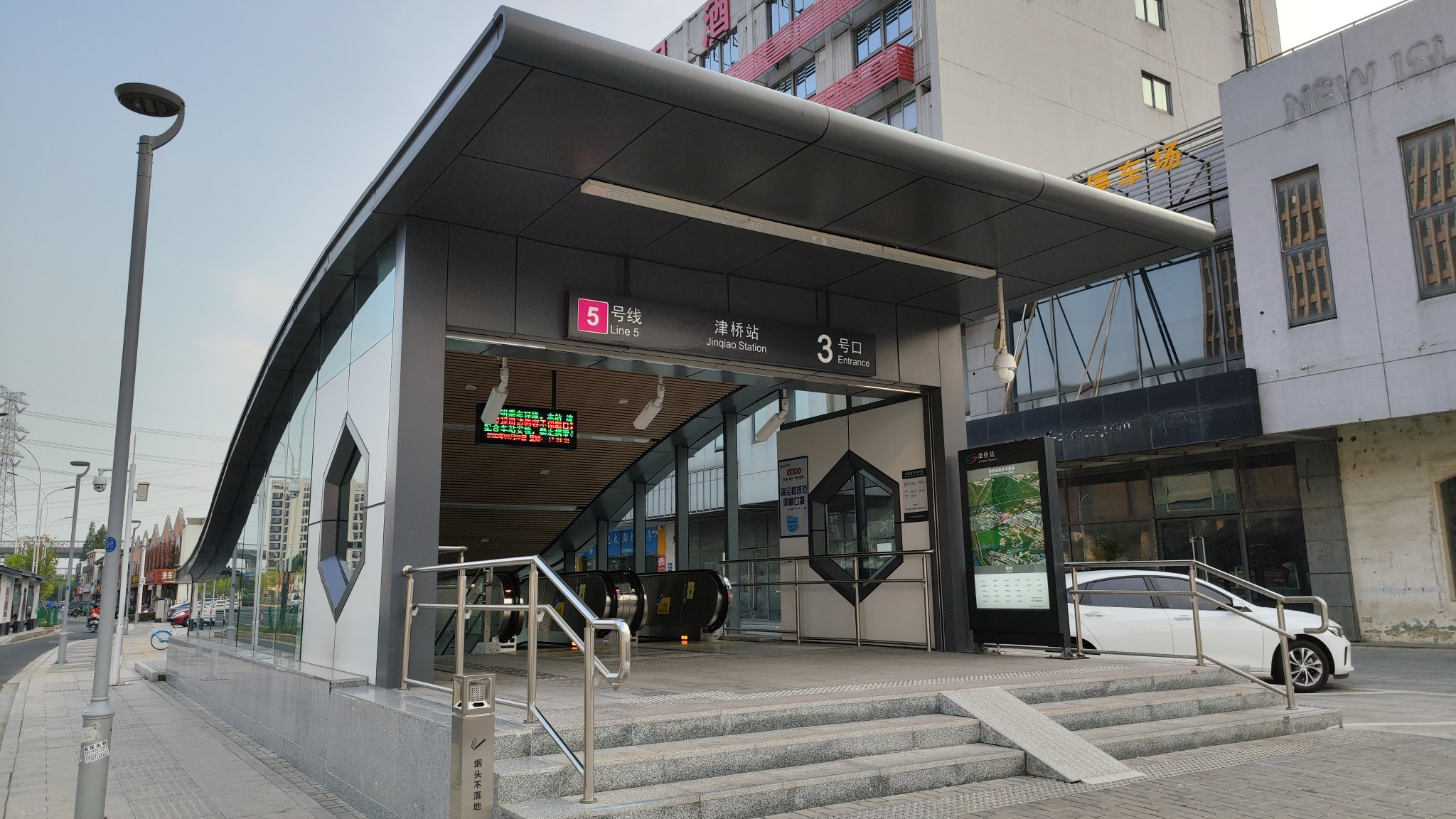
- Exit 3 of Jinqiao station

General information
- Location: Intersection of Sunwu Road and Xinxu Road, Xukou Town, Wuzhong District, Suzhou, Jiangsu; China
- Coordinates: 31°13′52.21″N 120°28′5.63″E
- Operator: Suzhou Rail Transit Co., Ltd.
- Line: Line 5
- Platforms: 2 (1 island platform)
- Tracks: 2
- Connections: Bus routes 58, 585, 615, 691, 692

Construction
- Structure type: Underground (2 levels)

History
- Opened: June 29, 2021; 5 years ago
- Former names: Zangxu Highway (臧胥公路站, engineering name)

Services
Preceding station	Suzhou Metro	Following station
Huadun towards Taihu Xiangshan	Line 5	Xukou towards Yangchenghu South
Location

Jinqiao Station (Chinese: 津桥) is a station on Line 5 of the Suzhou Metro. The station is located in Wuzhong District, Jiangsu. It has been in use since June 29, 2021, when Line 5 first opened to the public.

== History ==
The station was originally known as Zangxu Highway station (臧胥公路站) during the planning and construction of Line 5.

The station was built under Civil Contract Section 22 (5号线22标) of Line 5 by the China Railway Electrification Bureau Group Railway Engineering Company. Its underground structure was constructed using the bottom-up cut-and-cover method. Shield tunnelling for Contract Section 22 began on March 28, 2019. The contract covered two stations, Zangxu Highway (Jinqiao) and Dongdajie (Xukou), and two tunnel intervals extending from Zangxu Highway to Dongdajie and from Dongdajie to Maopeng Road (Maopenglu East). The four tunnel bores had a combined length of 4,256 metres (13,963 ft). All four tunnels were completed on December 8, 2019, 23 days ahead of schedule.

On April 28, 2018, Suzhou Rail Transit began a month-long public solicitation for suggestions for Line 5 station names. On September 3, 2019, the Suzhou Municipal Transportation Bureau published the proposed names for public consultation. The approved names were announced on August 14, 2020, when the station was confirmed as Jinqiao station (津桥站). The station opened at 10:00 CST on June 29, 2021. On July 2, 2021, the Jinqiao bus stop was moved approximately 300 metres (980 ft) north to improve connections with Line 5.

== Station layout ==
Located beneath the intersection of Sunwu Road (孙武路) and Xinxu Road (新胥路) in Xukou Town, Jinqiao station is a two-level underground box structure measuring 225.8 metres (741 ft) in total length and 19.95 metres (65.5 ft) in standard external width. Level B1 serves as the station concourse, while Level B2 contains a single island platform serving two tracks. Nearby landmarks include Xuwang Garden (胥王园) and Suzhou Water Sky Hotel (水云天酒店).

G	Street Level	Exits, Sunwu Road, Xinxu Road, bus stops
B1	Concourse	Station hall
B2	Track 1	← Line 5 towards Taihu Xiangshan (Huadun)
B2	Island platform, doors will open on the left	
B2	Track 2	Line 5 towards Yangchenghu South (Xukou) →

== Operations and transport connections ==
=== Train service ===
Line 5 operates six-car Type B trainsets. During peak periods, trains run at intervals of approximately 5.5 minutes, increasing to around 7 minutes at other times. First and last train departure times at Jinqiao station are scheduled as follows:

Direction	First train	Last train (Mon–Thu)	Last train (Fri–Sun)
Westbound (towards Taihu Xiangshan)	06:35	23:29	00:14 (+1 day)
Eastbound (towards Yangchenghu South)	05:44	22:24	23:09

=== Bus connections ===
Passengers exiting the station (including via Exit 3) can transfer to municipal bus routes at the Jinqiao (津桥) bus stop. The following routes serve the stop:

- Route 58
- Route 585
- Route 615
- Route 691
- Route 692
