= Duchuanqiao station =

Suzhou Metro station

Duchuanqiao 渎川桥
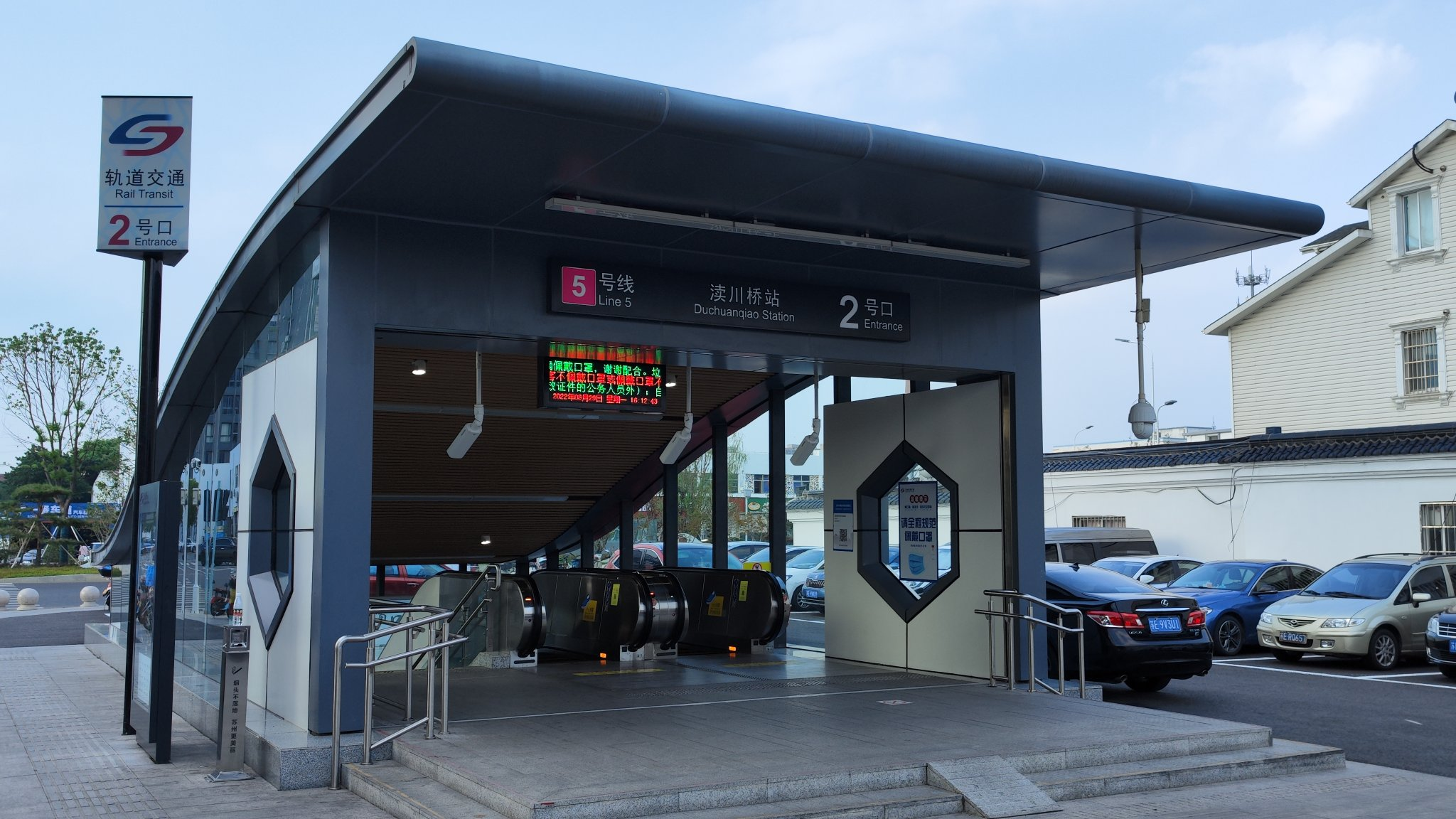

General information
- Location: Wuzhong District, Suzhou, Jiangsu; China
- Operated by: Suzhou Rail Transit Co., Ltd
- Line: Line 5
- Platforms: 2 (1 island platform)

Construction
- Structure type: Underground

History
- Opened: June 29, 2021

Services
Preceding station	Suzhou Metro	Following station
Lingyanshan towards Taihu Xiangshan	Line 5	Dazhiqiao towards Yangchenghu South
Location

Duchuanqiao Station (Chinese: 渎川桥) is a station on Line 5 of the Suzhou Metro. The station is located in Wuzhong District, Jiangsu. It has been in use since June 29, 2021, when Line 5 first opened to the public.
