= Dazhiqiao station =

Suzhou Metro station

Dazhiqiao 大治桥
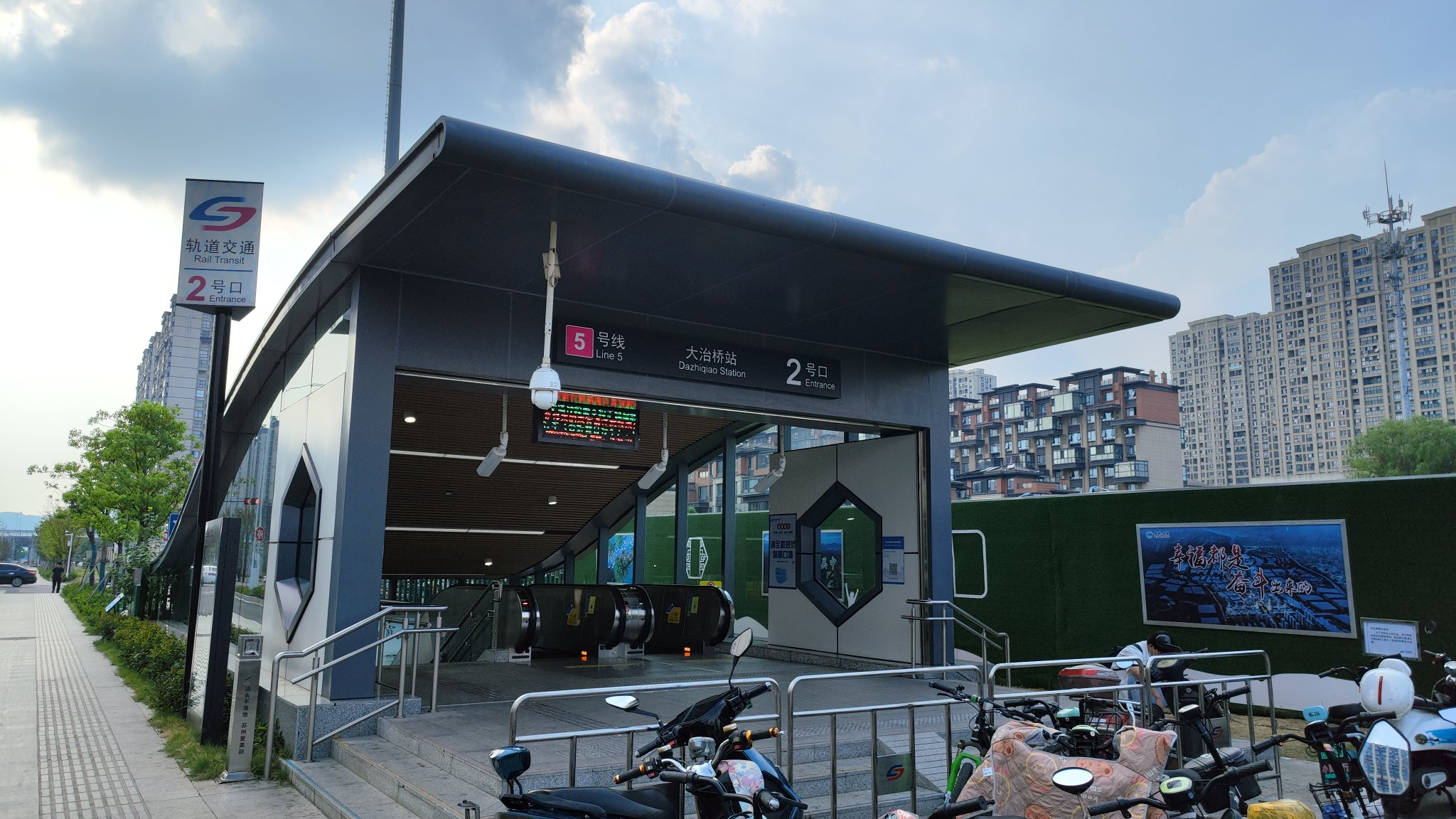

General information
- Location: Wuzhong District, Suzhou, Jiangsu; China
- Coordinates: 31.26443°N 120.53029°E
- Operated by: Suzhou Rail Transit Co., Ltd
- Line: Line 5
- Platforms: 2 (1 island platform)

Construction
- Structure type: Underground

History
- Opened: June 29, 2021

Services
| Preceding station | Suzhou Metro | Following station |
|---|---|---|
| Duchuanqiao towards Taihu Xiangshan | Line 5 | Xikuatang towards Yangchenghu South |
Location

Dazhiqiao Station (Chinese: 大治桥) is a station on Line 5 of the Suzhou Metro. The station is located in Wuzhong District, Jiangsu. It has been in use since June 29, 2021, when Line 5 first opened to the public.
