= Suzhou Lakeside New City =

Area of Suzhou, Jiangsu, China

Suzhou Lakeside New City (Chinese: 苏州滨湖新城), also called Eastern Taihu Lakeside New City (Chinese: 东太湖滨湖新城, used in Wuzhong District) or Wujiang Lakeside New City (Chinese: 吴江滨湖新城, used in Wujiang District), is a new city located in the southern part of Suzhou, China. It is a "city" in the "one core, four cities" (Chinese: 一核四城) plan of Suzhou. The initial phase of it occupies an area of 10.05 km^{2}.

== See also ==
- Suzhou High-Speed Rail New City
