= Guoyuan Lu station =

Suzhou Metro station

Coordinates: 31°15′02″N 120°40′47″E

Guoyuan Lu 郭苑路
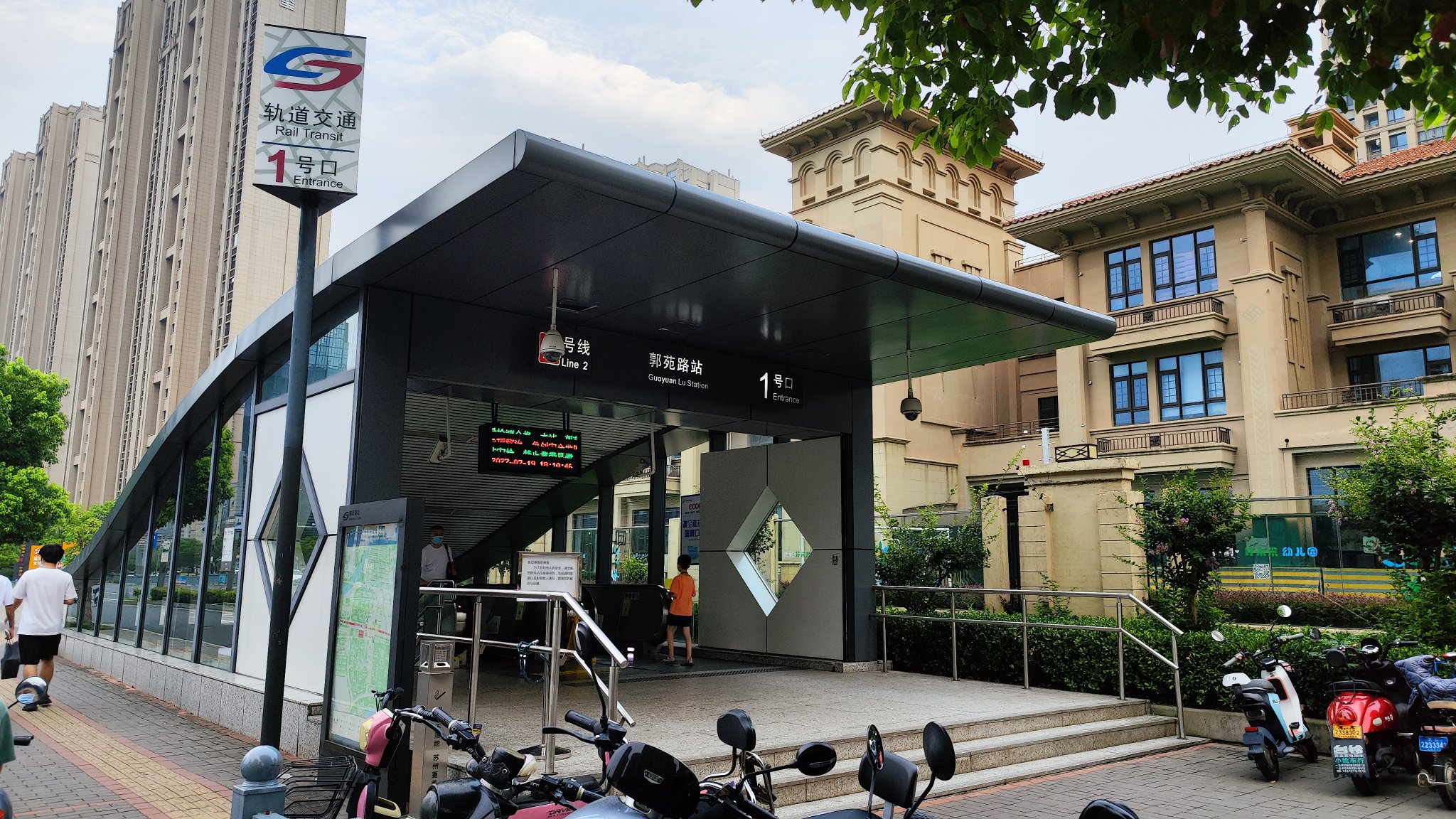

General information
- Location: Wuzhong District, Suzhou, Jiangsu; China
- Operated by: Suzhou Rail Transit Co., Ltd
- Line(s): Line 2
- Platforms: 2 (1 island platform)

Construction
- Structure type: Underground

History
- Opened: September 24, 2016

Services
Preceding station	Suzhou Rail Transit	Following station
Guoxiang towards Qihe	Line 2	Yinshan Hu towards Sangtiandao

Guoyuan Lu Station (Chinese: 郭苑路) is a station on Line 2 of the Suzhou Metro located in Wuzhong District of Suzhou. It started operation on September 24, 2016, with the opening of the Baodaiqiao South - Sangtiandao extension on Line 2.
