= Suzhou HSR New Town =

Area of Suzhou, Jiangsu, China

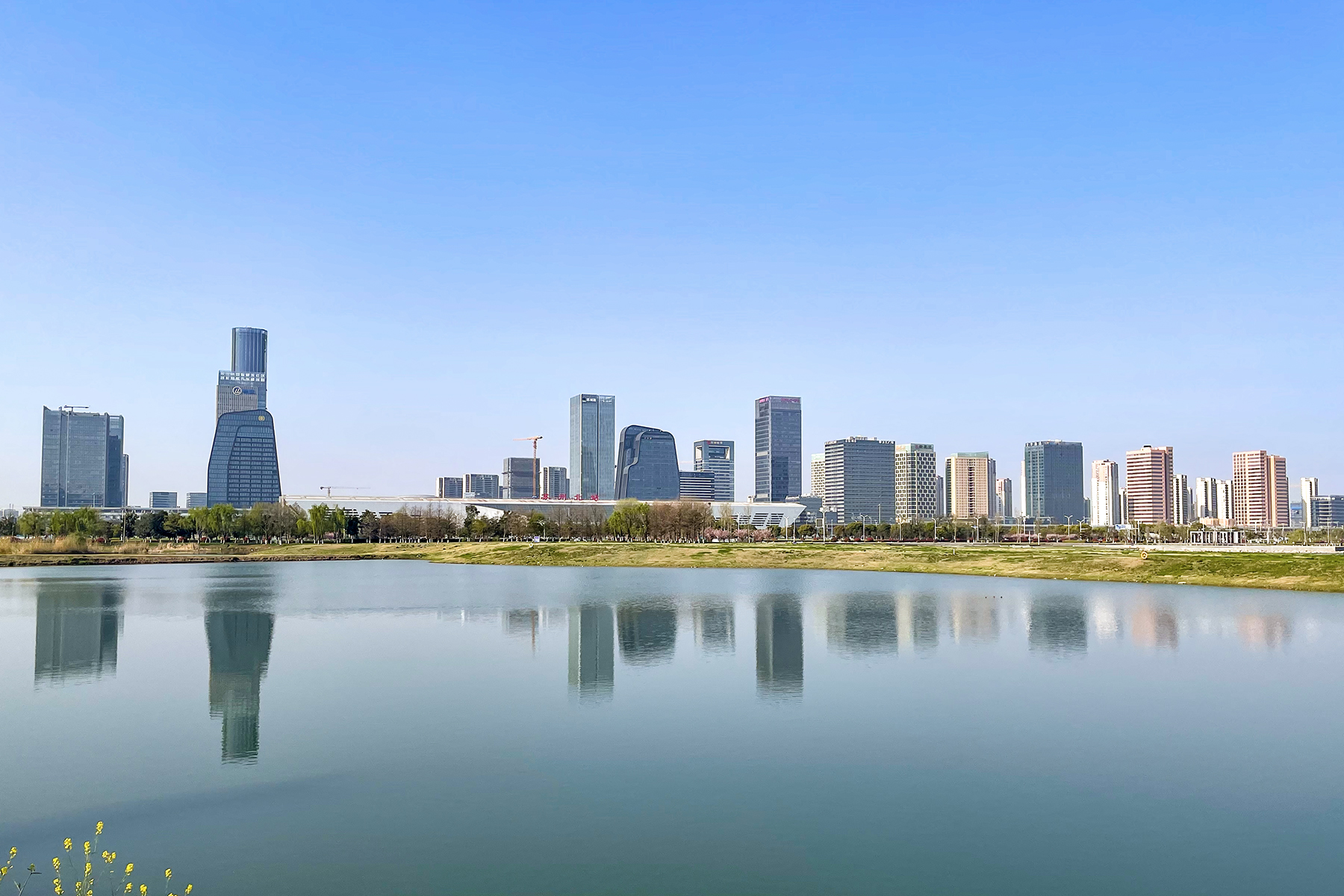
Suzhou HSR New Town

Suzhou HSR New Town (Chinese: 苏州高铁新城, literally Suzhou High-Speed Rail New City), surrounding Suzhou North Railway Station on Beijing–Shanghai High-Speed Railway, is a new city located in the northern part of Suzhou, China. This new city is administrated by Xiangcheng District. It is a "city" in the "one core, four cities" (Chinese: 一核四城) plan of Suzhou. The promoter of it occupies an area of 4.7 km^{2}, and its total area is 28.52 km^{2}.

== See also ==
- Suzhou Lakeside New City
