= Hengjing =

Hengjing (恆敬, ?–1832), courtesy name Mianting (勉亭) and originally named Hengmin (恆敏), was a Manchu official of the Irgen Gioro clan and the Plain Blue Banner. He served as Imperial Resident of Xining (西寧辦事大臣) during the Daoguang reign.

== Biography ==
In the early Jiaqing era, Hengjing served as a sub-prefect of Dartsedo. Due to his effective management of military supplies and grain transport, he was promoted to Prefect of Suiding and subsequently held a number of senior posts, including Provincial Treasurer of Jiangning, Minister of the Court of Imperial Entertainments, and Imperial Resident at Hami. During the Qing campaign against Jahangir Khoja, he supervised military logistics, including the transport of supplies, the minting of coinage to purchase grain, and the expansion of relay stations. In 1827, he was transferred as Imperial Resident at Ush and later oversaw postwar reconstruction in Kashgar before being appointed Imperial Resident at Yarkand. While serving in Yarkand, he played an important role in the development of the new city. By reclaiming wasteland, he secured sufficient grain production to support an additional 2,000 garrison troops annually. He also proposed opening more than one hundred li of fertile land northwest of the city for cultivation. Although the project was completed by his successor, Bichang (壁昌), contemporary sources noted that it was largely the continuation of Hengjing's original plan. In 1828, Hengjing requested retirement due to illness. He later served as Deputy Commander of the Plain White Banner Han Chinese Corps (漢軍正白旗副都統) and as Imperial Resident of Xining. He died of illness in 1832.

One of Hengjing's daughters became a secondary consort (側福晉) of Yixun (奕勳), the Prince Yi.
