= Yuhua Stone =

Kind of stone found in Nanjing, China

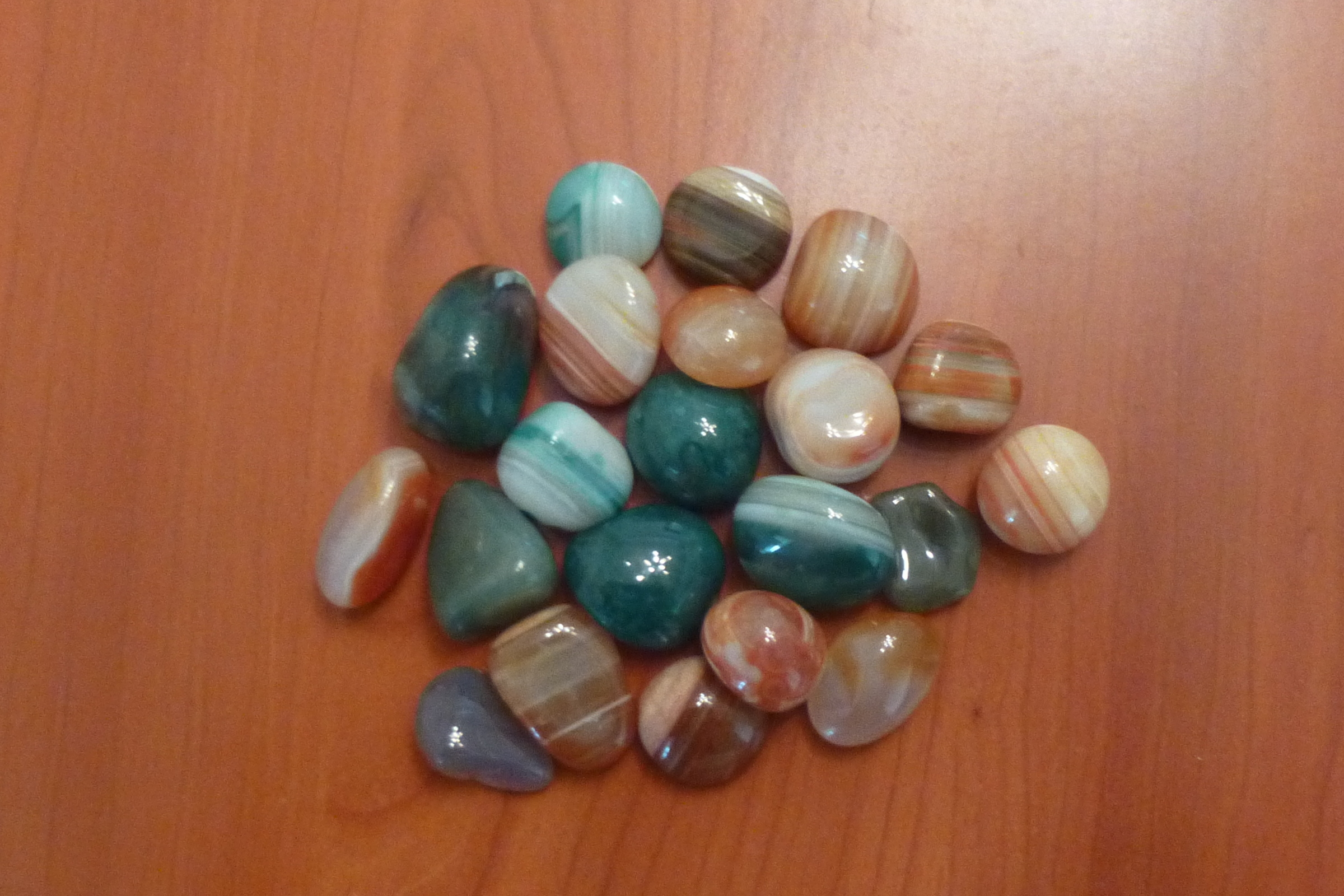
Yuhua stones

The Yuhua stone (Chinese: 雨花石; pinyin: yuhua shi; lit. 'rain flower stone') is a special kind of stone found in Nanjing, China, due to the unique geology of the area. Yuhua stones, or pebbles, are of sedimentary origin and consist of minerals including quartz and other silicates. They are found in the Yangtze River, polished smooth by the action of water. Colors include red, rose, yellow, green, and white.

== Legend ==
The origin of the Yuhua Stone is told through the legend of a Chinese monk named Yunguang (雲光) who lived during the Liang dynasty. Yunguang used to travel around the country to deliver sermons. One day, He travelled to Nanjing, there, he sat on the Guanghua Gate for three days, talking about his concept, without eating or drinking. According to the legend, his sincerity moved God deeply, so God rained thousands of colourful flowers from the sky to reward him. When the flowers touched the ground, they turned into the Yuhua Stone.

== Description ==
The stone is known for its beautiful patterns, often imagined to look like animals or flowers.

== Idiom ==
"Chinese: 天花乱坠; pinyin: TianHualuanZhui", means "many flowers falling from the sky".
