= Mudu =

Mudu 木渎
- Town
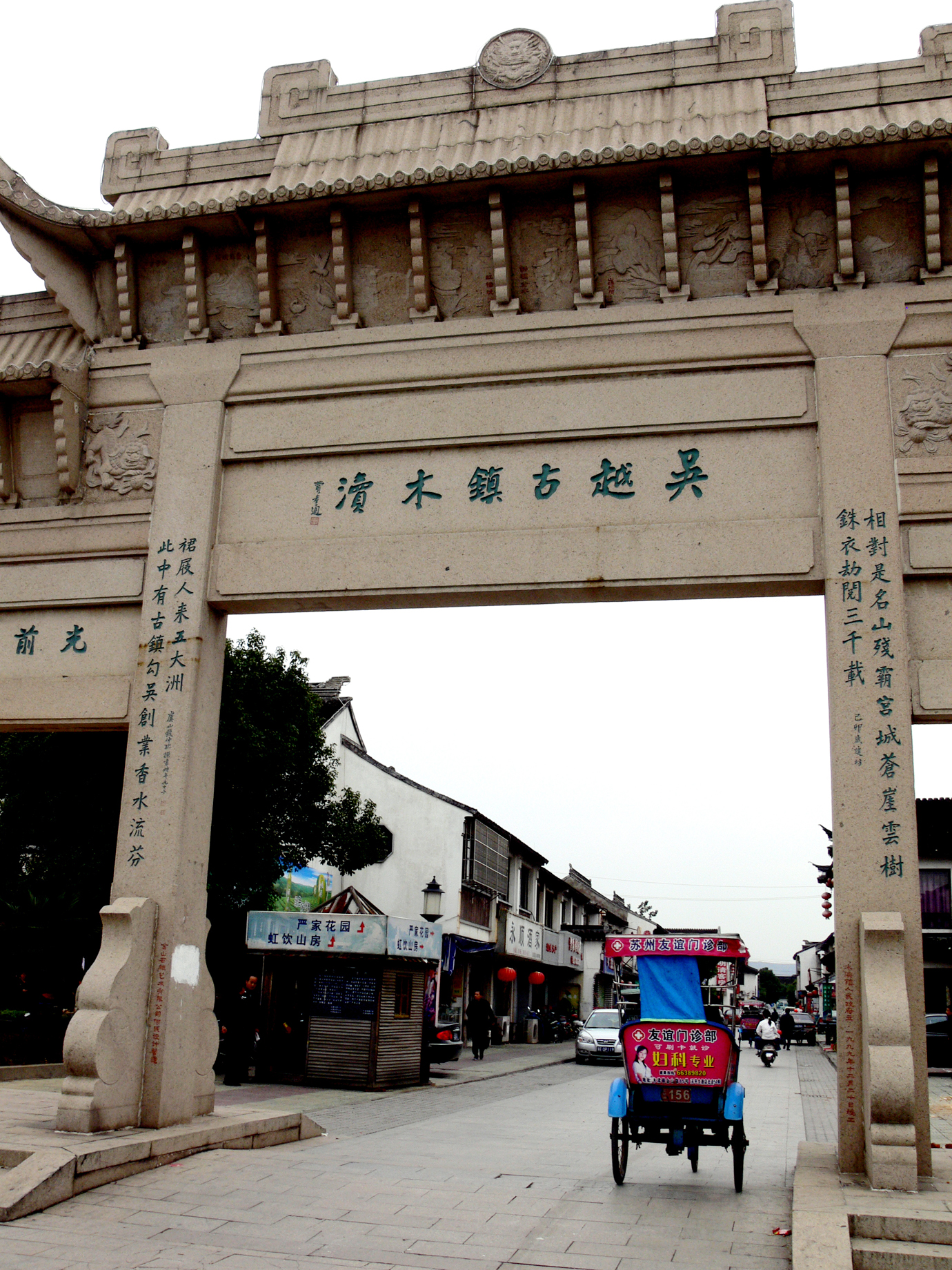
- Interactive map of Mudu
- Coordinates: 31.2507°N 120.52358°E
- Country: China
- Province: Jiangsu
- Prefecture-level city: Suzhou
- District: Wuzhong

Mudu (simplified Chinese: 木渎; traditional Chinese: 木瀆; pinyin: Mùdú; Suzhounese: ⁸moq-doq₈, Wu Chinese pronunciation: [moʔ˧ doʔ˦]) is a town in Wuzhong District, Suzhou, Jiangsu Province, China. It takes about 1.5 hours to drive from the downtown in Suzhou to Mudu. Mudu is a small town which is famous for its history. During the Qing dynasty, the Qianlong Emperor visited Mudu six times when he traveled around the country. Nowadays, many teleplay groups also come to Mudu frequently to film television series. Due to this, many outlanders came to Mudu to make their business by renting out costumes and taking photos for visitors. There is a famous street in Suzhou named Shantang Street, Mudu also has one. It is shorter than the one in Suzhou downtown, but if you go straight along the street, one can approach to the Linyan Mountain. Many visitors will first visit this mountain when they visit Mudu.

== Attractions ==
One of the most notable attractions is Old Pine Tree Garden (古松园), built by a millionaire in the late Qing dynasty. There are several gardens like Old Pine Tree Garden in Tongli, like Yan's Garden, which are the old living places by many wealthy people who retired from the palace.

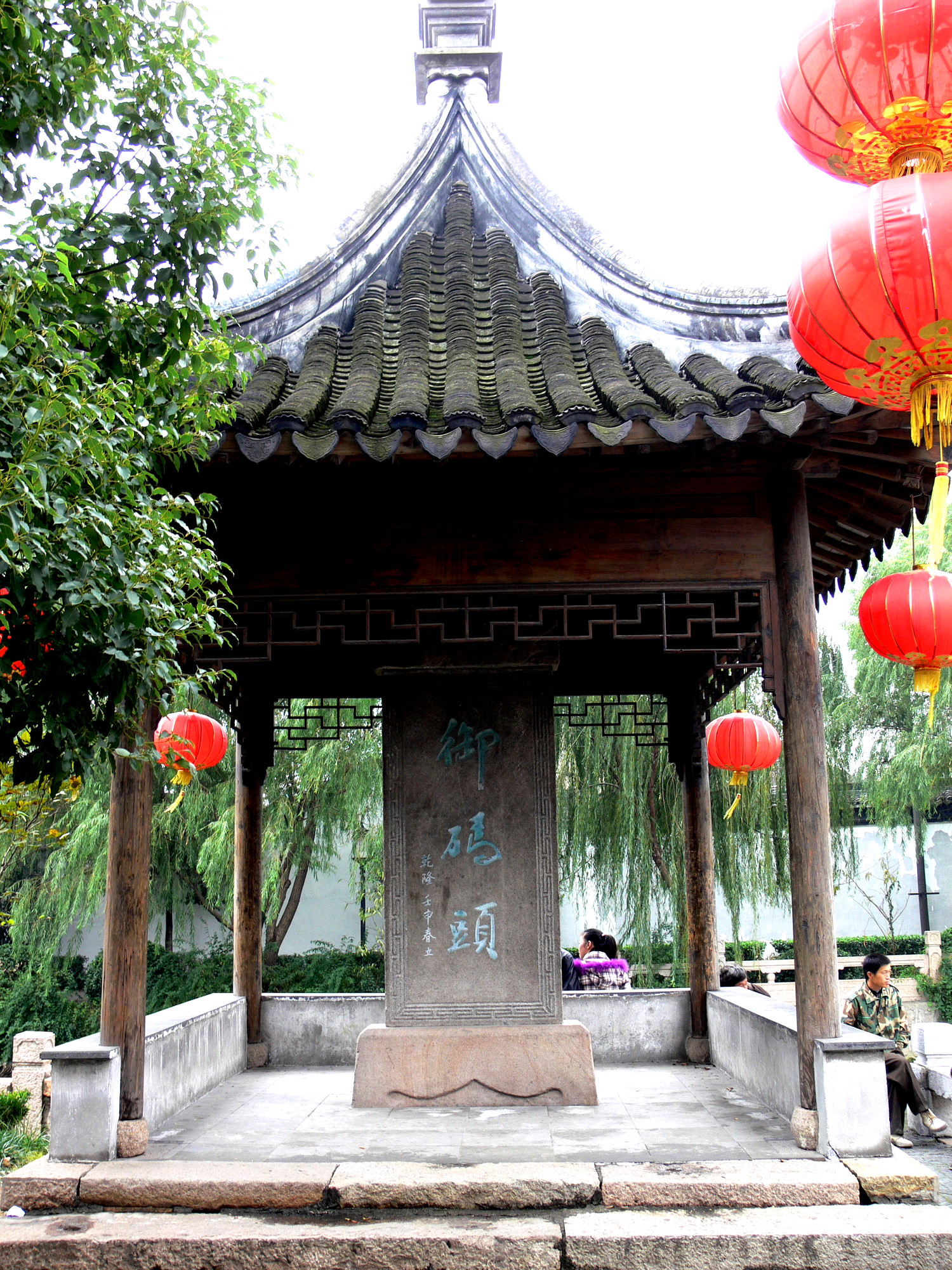
Mudu Imperial Dock

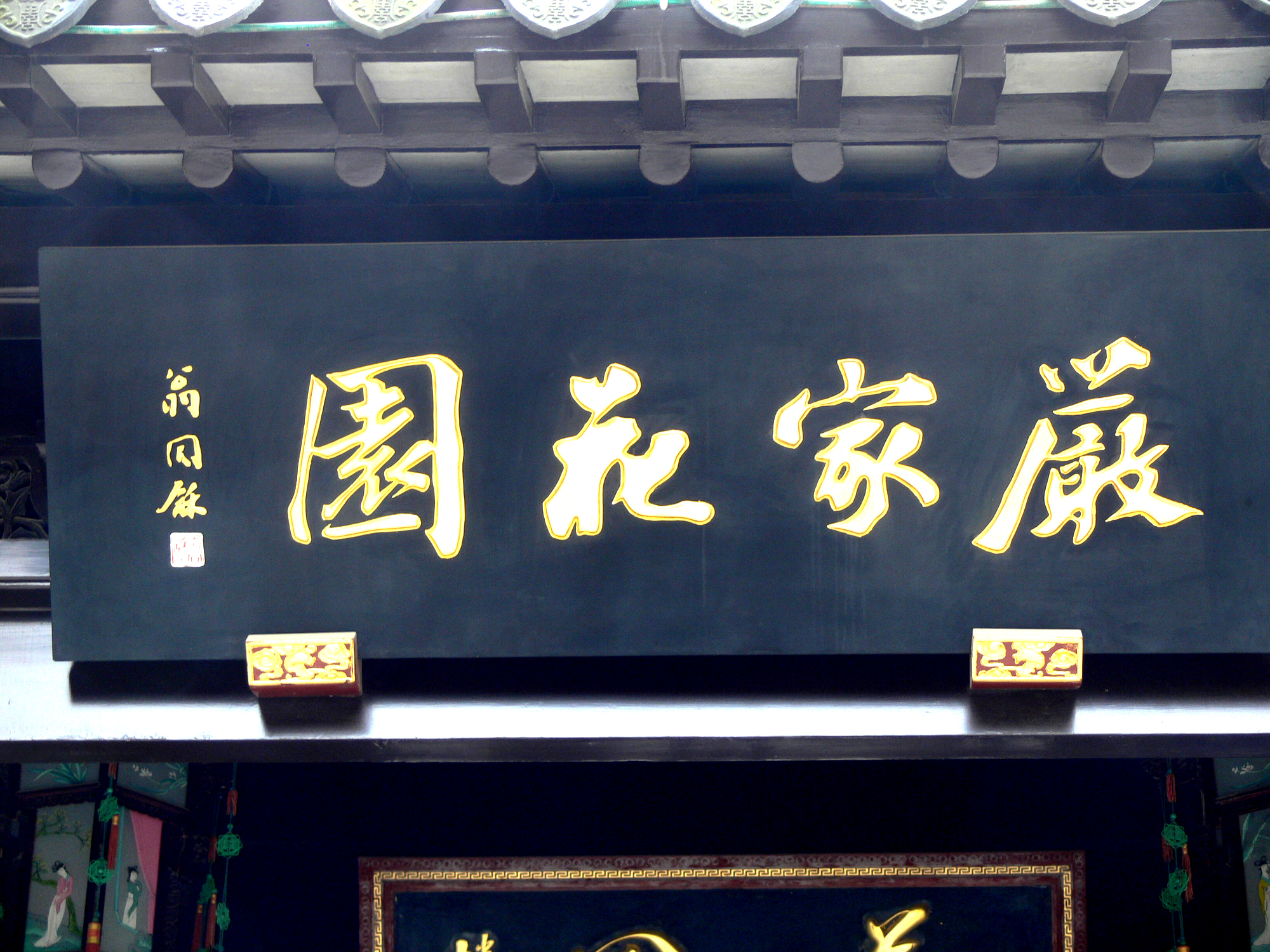
Yan's Garden

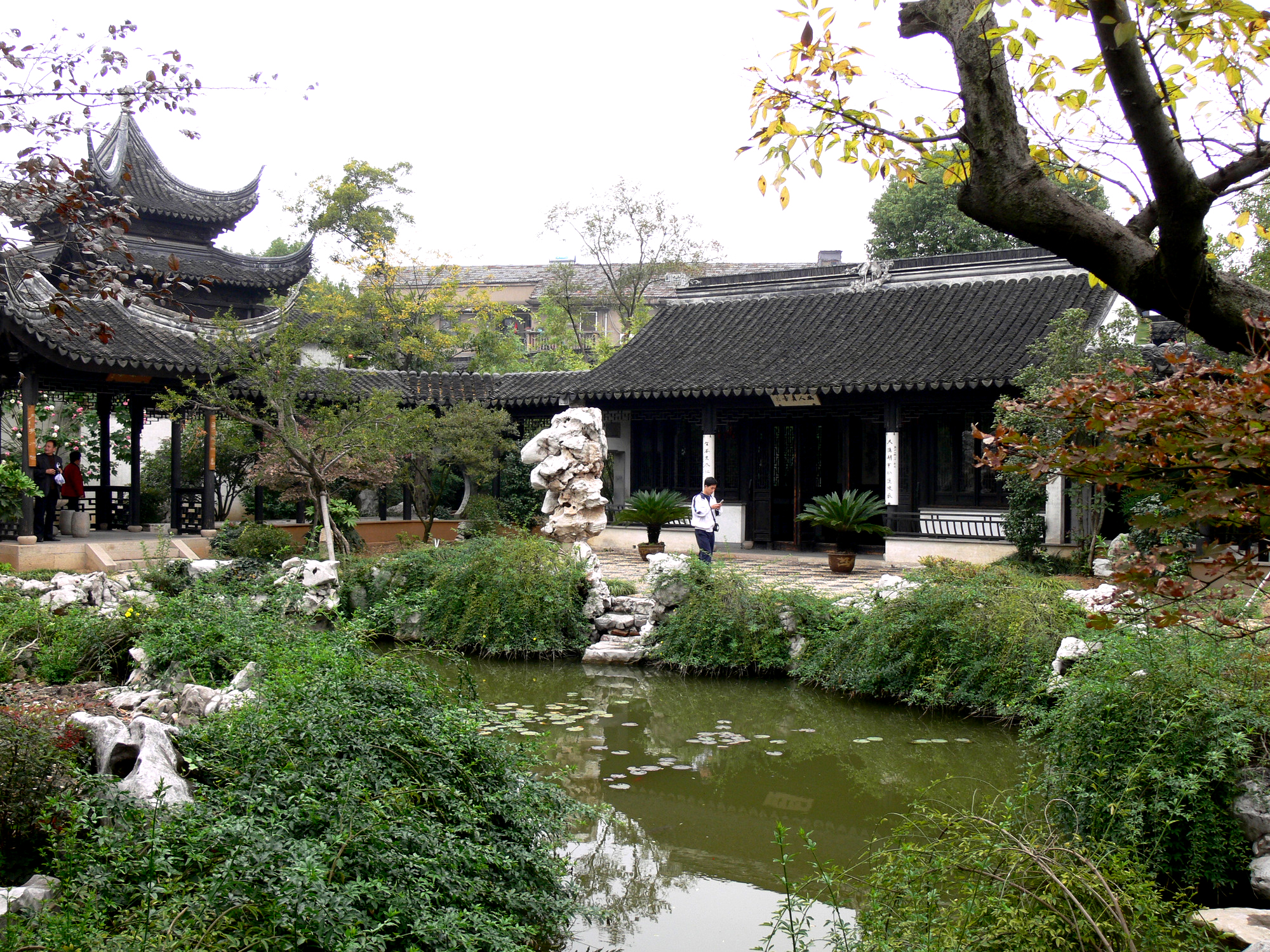
The Qianlong Emperor's travel palace "Hong yin Resort"

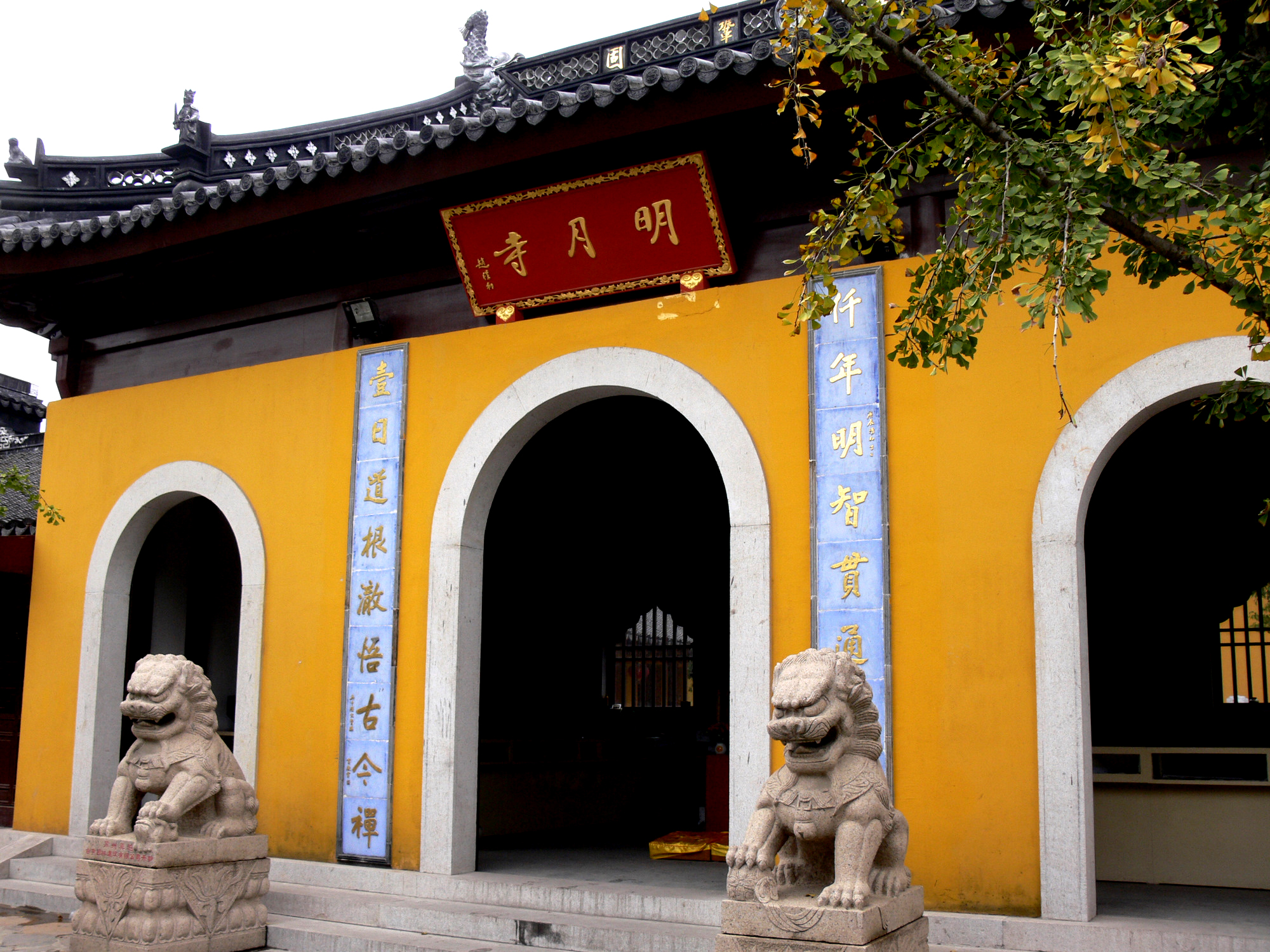
Moonshine Temple
