= Wuzhong, Suzhou =

Wuzhong 吴中区
- District
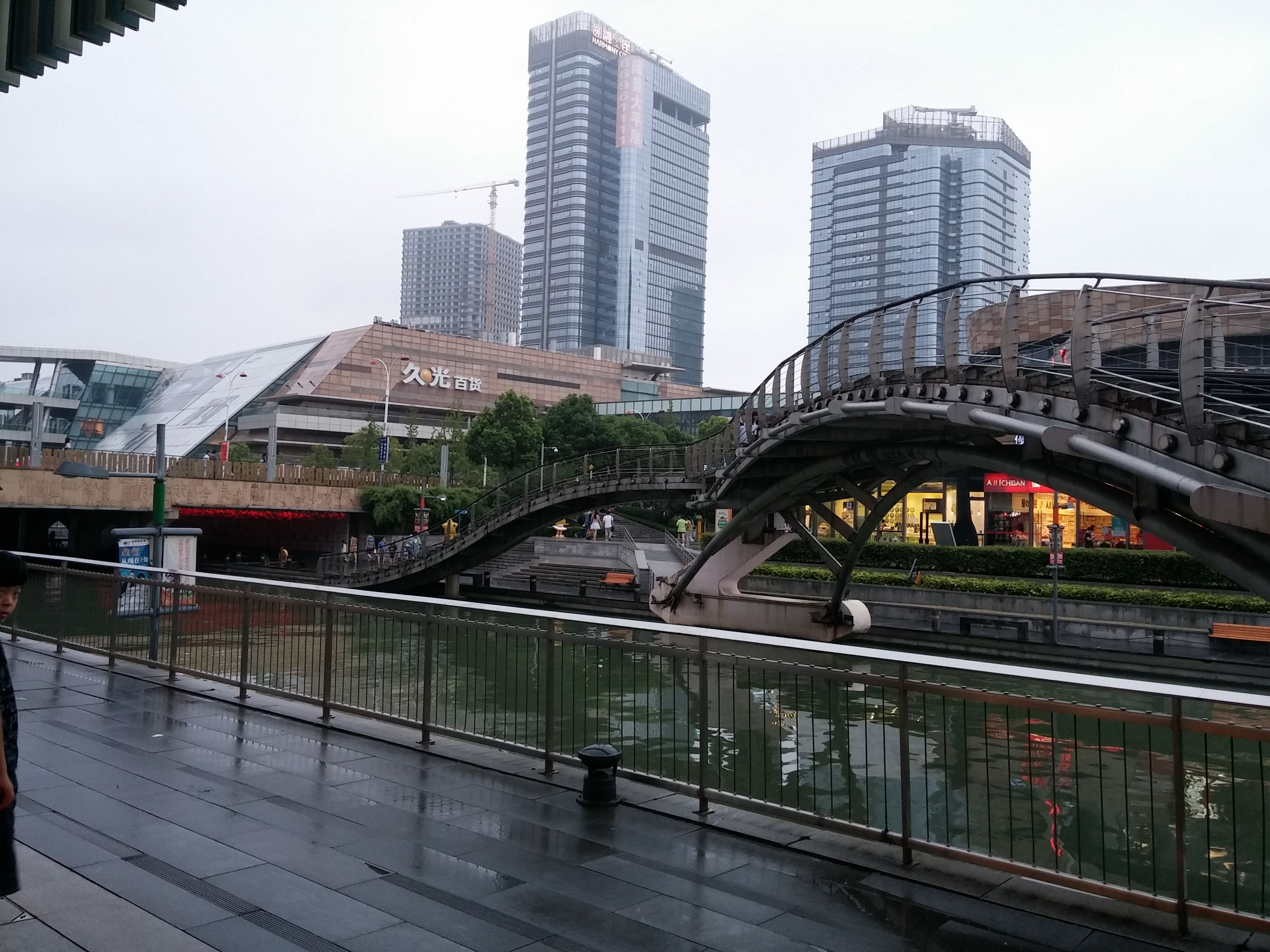
- Wuzhong District in August 2015

- Location in Jiangsu
- Coordinates: 31°10′42″N 120°24′38″E
- Country: People's Republic of China
- Province: Jiangsu
- Prefecture-level city: Suzhou

Area
  - District: 745 km^{2} (288 sq mi)

Population (2020 census)
  - District: 1,388,972
  - Density: 1,860/km^{2} (4,830/sq mi)
  - Urban: 1,070,750
  - Rural: 318,222
- Time zone: UTC+8 (China Standard)
- Postal code: 215000
- Website: http://www.szwz.gov.cn/

Wuzhong District (simplified Chinese: 吴中区; traditional Chinese: 吳中區; pinyin: Wúzhōng Qū) is one of five urban districts of Suzhou, Jiangsu Province, China. It has a land area of 770 km^{2} (300 sq mi) and had a population of 1,388,972 in 2020.

== Administrative divisions ==
In the present, Wuzhong District has 8 subdistricts and 7 towns.

8 subdistricts

- Suyuan (苏苑街道)
- Changqiao (长桥街道)
- Longxi (龙西街道)
- Chengnan (城南街道)
- Yuexi (越溪街道)
- Hengjing (横泾街道)
- Guoxiang (郭巷街道)
- Xiangshan (香山街道)

7 towns

- Luzhi (甪直镇)
- Guangfu (光福镇)
- Linhu (临湖镇)
- Mudu (木渎镇)
- Jinting (金庭镇)
- Dongshan (东山镇)
- Xukou (胥口镇)

== Climate ==
Climate data for Wuzhong District, elevation 8 m (26 ft), (1991–2020 normals)
Month	Jan	Feb	Mar	Apr	May	Jun	Jul	Aug	Sep	Oct	Nov	Dec	Year
Mean daily maximum °C (°F)	8.1 (46.6)	10.4 (50.7)	15.2 (59.4)	21.1 (70.0)	26.1 (79.0)	28.7 (83.7)	33.0 (91.4)	32.6 (90.7)	28.4 (83.1)	23.4 (74.1)	17.4 (63.3)	10.8 (51.4)	21.3 (70.3)
Daily mean °C (°F)	4.5 (40.1)	6.4 (43.5)	10.7 (51.3)	16.3 (61.3)	21.5 (70.7)	24.9 (76.8)	29.1 (84.4)	28.8 (83.8)	24.7 (76.5)	19.5 (67.1)	13.4 (56.1)	7.0 (44.6)	17.2 (63.0)
Mean daily minimum °C (°F)	1.8 (35.2)	3.4 (38.1)	7.2 (45.0)	12.5 (54.5)	17.9 (64.2)	22.0 (71.6)	26.1 (79.0)	26.0 (78.8)	21.9 (71.4)	16.3 (61.3)	10.2 (50.4)	4.0 (39.2)	14.1 (57.4)
Average precipitation mm (inches)	74.8 (2.94)	67.0 (2.64)	87.3 (3.44)	82.8 (3.26)	104.1 (4.10)	211.1 (8.31)	156.1 (6.15)	155.6 (6.13)	104.3 (4.11)	69.1 (2.72)	63.9 (2.52)	48.6 (1.91)	1,224.7 (48.23)
Average precipitation days (≥ 0.1 mm)	10.6	10.2	12.3	11.3	11.0	13.9	12.0	12.8	8.6	7.5	8.8	7.8	126.8
Average snowy days	2.7	1.9	0.4	0	0	0	0	0	0	0	0.2	0.8	6
Average relative humidity (%)	73	73	71	69	70	78	76	77	75	72	73	70	73
Mean monthly sunshine hours	108.8	111.5	139.0	162.0	166.1	120.5	192.4	190.4	154.5	147.3	127.7	127.2	1,747.4
Percentage possible sunshine	34	36	37	42	39	29	45	47	42	42	41	41	40
Source: China Meteorological Administration

Climate data for Dongshan Town, Suzhou, elevation 17 m (56 ft), (1991–2020 normals)
Month	Jan	Feb	Mar	Apr	May	Jun	Jul	Aug	Sep	Oct	Nov	Dec	Year
Mean daily maximum °C (°F)	7.5 (45.5)	9.9 (49.8)	14.5 (58.1)	20.6 (69.1)	25.6 (78.1)	28.3 (82.9)	32.6 (90.7)	32.2 (90.0)	28.0 (82.4)	22.7 (72.9)	16.8 (62.2)	10.2 (50.4)	20.7 (69.3)
Daily mean °C (°F)	4.2 (39.6)	6.3 (43.3)	10.3 (50.5)	16.1 (61.0)	21.3 (70.3)	24.6 (76.3)	28.8 (83.8)	28.4 (83.1)	24.3 (75.7)	19.0 (66.2)	13.0 (55.4)	6.7 (44.1)	16.9 (62.4)
Mean daily minimum °C (°F)	1.7 (35.1)	3.4 (38.1)	7.2 (45.0)	12.5 (54.5)	17.8 (64.0)	21.8 (71.2)	25.8 (78.4)	25.6 (78.1)	21.4 (70.5)	15.8 (60.4)	10.0 (50.0)	3.9 (39.0)	13.9 (57.0)
Average precipitation mm (inches)	77.2 (3.04)	70.1 (2.76)	103.1 (4.06)	82.6 (3.25)	106.5 (4.19)	206.5 (8.13)	150.2 (5.91)	148.7 (5.85)	84.8 (3.34)	66.3 (2.61)	57.2 (2.25)	48.7 (1.92)	1,201.9 (47.31)
Average precipitation days (≥ 0.1 mm)	11.1	10.5	13.0	11.4	11.6	14.6	11.6	12.1	8.8	7.4	9.0	8.4	129.5
Average snowy days	3.3	1.9	0.8	0	0	0	0	0	0	0	0.2	0.9	7.1
Average relative humidity (%)	77	76	75	73	74	81	79	79	79	76	77	74	77
Mean monthly sunshine hours	112.0	117.0	140.4	166.7	175.4	137.7	210.2	209.6	171.2	166.6	134.5	130.3	1,871.6
Percentage possible sunshine	35	37	38	43	41	33	49	52	47	48	43	42	42
Source: China Meteorological Administration

== See also ==
- Wu County
