= Huqiu =

Huqiu may refer to the following locations in China:

== Suzhou ==
- Tiger Hill, Suzhou, or Huqiu (虎丘)
- Huqiu District (虎丘区), named after the Tiger Hill
- Tiger Hill Pagoda, or Huqiu Pagoda (虎丘塔), pagoda on Tiger Hill
- Yunyan Temple (Suzhou), a temple on Tiger Hill, also known as "Huqiu Temple" (虎丘寺)

== Fujian ==
- Huqiu, Anxi County (虎邱镇), town in Anxi County, Fujian
