= Yunyan Temple (Suzhou) =

Temple in Suzhou, Jiangsu, China

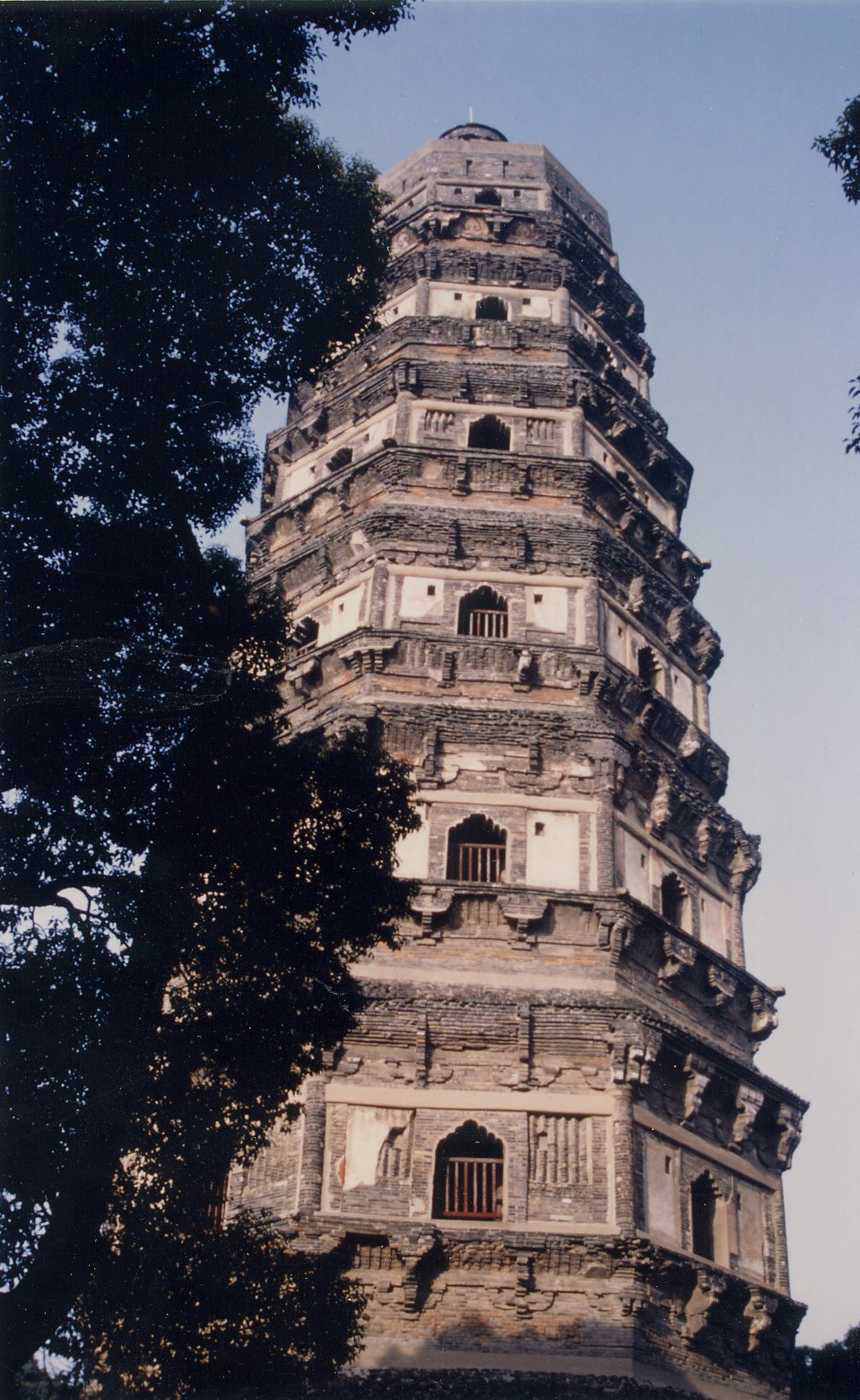
- Tiger Hill Pagoda, one of the few surviving elements of the former temple
- Traditional Chinese: 雲巖寺
- Simplified Chinese: 云岩寺
Transcriptions
Standard Mandarin
- Hanyu Pinyin: Yúnyán sì
- Wade–Giles: Yün-yan Ssu

Tiger Hill Temple
- Chinese: 虎丘寺
Transcriptions
Standard Mandarin
- Hanyu Pinyin: Hǔqiū sì
- Wade–Giles: Hu-ch'iu Ssu

Yunyan Temple, also known as Tiger Hill or Huqiu Temple, was a Buddhist temple located on Tiger Hill in Suzhou in southeastern Jiangsu Province in eastern China.

== History ==
The temple was founded in 327. It was extremely important during the Song Dynasty, when it was the center of many religious events, festivals, and worshiping.

It suffered damage in successive wars throughout history. It was last rebuilt in 1871 after the Taiping Rebellion. Much of the restored temple was finally destroyed during the Second Sino-Japanese War and Chinese Civil War, after which it was abandoned.

The grounds of the temple covered most of what is today Tiger Hill Park. Some elements still survive, including the formal entrance to the temple (now park grounds), its famous leaning pagoda, and several other buildings and smaller shrines scattered throughout the park.
