= Tiger Hill, Suzhou =

Tourist destination in Suzhou, China

Coordinates: 31.337531°N 120.576167°E

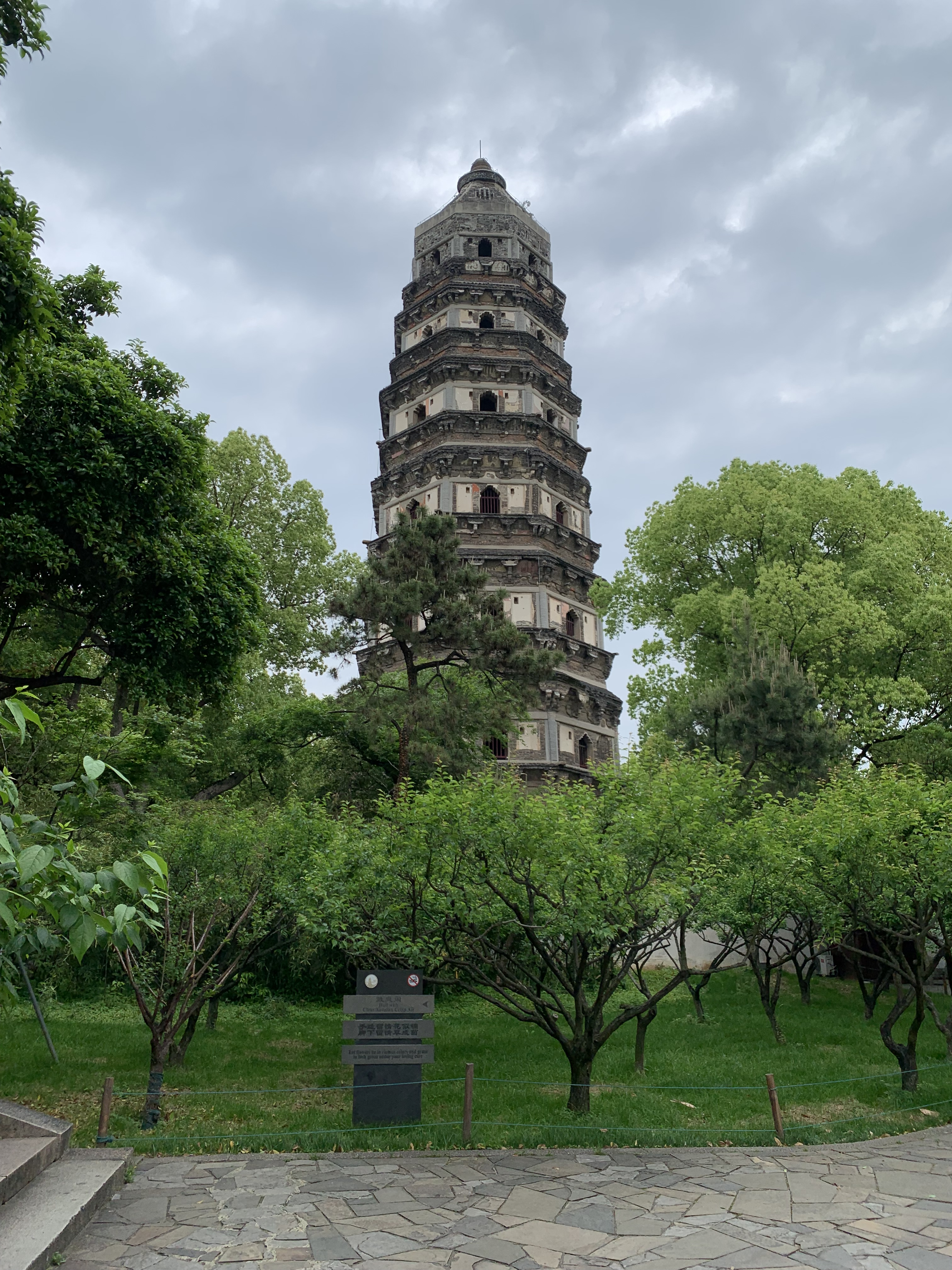
The Tiger Hill Pagoda, the landmark of the Tiger Hill Scenic Area

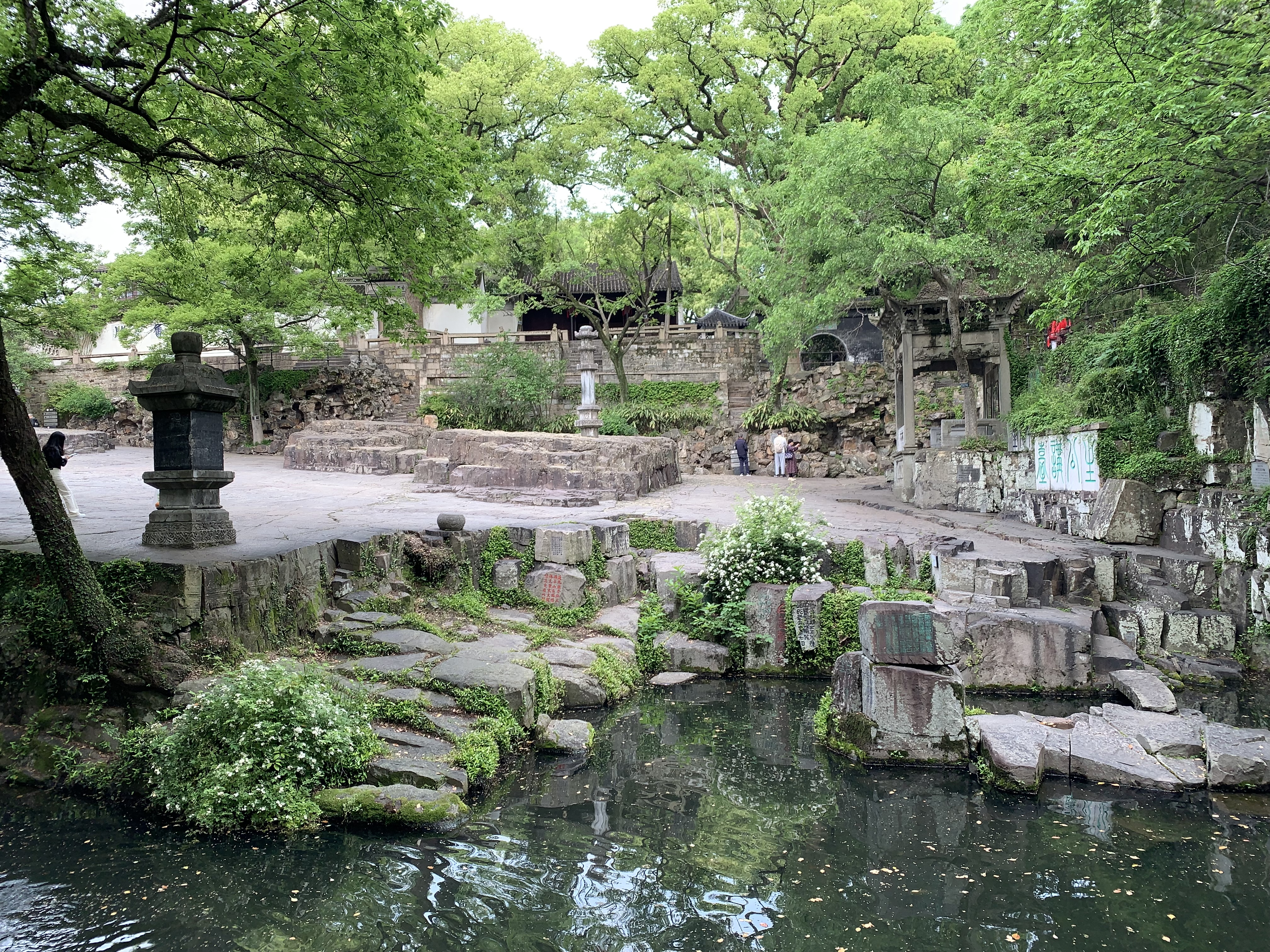
Thousand People Rock, a plaza on a lower level from the Tiger Hill Pagoda

Tiger Hill or Huqiu (Chinese: 虎丘; pinyin: Hǔ Qiū; Suzhou Wu: Hou chieu, Wu Chinese pronunciation: [hou tɕʰʏ]) is a hill in Suzhou, China. It is a tourist destination that is known for its natural environment and historic sites. The hill's name is said to come from the fact it looks like a crouching tiger. Another legend states that a white tiger appeared on the hill to guard it following the burial of King Helü. The hill is also sometimes referred to in parallel with Shizishan (Chinese: 狮子山; pinyin: Shīzǐshān), another mountain in Suzhou which resembles a sitting lion.

== History ==
According to the Book of Historical Documents, King Helü of Wu was buried on the hill, then called the "Hill Emerging from the Sea". Its name derives from a legend that three days after his burial a white tiger appeared squatting on the hill.

The Yunyan Temple was founded on the hill in 327. It was particularly favored under the Song and was last refurbished in 1871, repairing the damage of the Taiping Rebellion. It was finally abandoned after the Second World War and Chinese Civil War.

== Geography ==
Tiger Hill has an elevation of over 30 m (98 ft) and covers about 20 hectares (49 acres).

== Tourism ==
The hill has been a tourist destination for over a thousand years, as is evident from the poetry and calligraphy carved into rocks on the hill. Its features include:

- Sword-Testing Rock: a rock in two pieces supposedly cleanly cleft by King Helü using a Wu sword of extraordinary sharpness.
- Sword Pond (Jianchi): a small rectangular pond, beneath which a treasure of some 3,000 swords are believed to have been buried. It is believed that the Wu King Helü was buried next to the lake wall. Efforts excavating the site were made in the 1950s, but eventually were stopped because the archeologists found the Leaning Pagoda's foundations resting on the site.
- Spring of Simplicity and Honesty: a well that, according to legend, first appeared as a spring to an exhausted monk carrying water up the entire length of the hill.
- Tiger Hill Pagoda: a pagoda that stands seven stories high and leans more than 2 m (6 ft 7 in) from the perpendicular at its highest point, locally reckoned as the Second Leaning Tower under Heaven.
- Lu Yu Well: a well attributed to Lu Yu, author of the Tea Classic.
- Thousand Person Rock (千人石, Qiānrén shí): a rock-based plaza at the bottom of the Leaning Tower Plaza. Legend says after the burial of Wu King Helü, his son Fuchai commanded the murder of some thousand craftsmen who were involved in his father's burial in order to conceal the exact location of the grave.
- Wanjing Villa: contains more than 600 penjing (Chinese bonsai trees) with two display areas, a tree stump and water/stone penjing.
- Penjing Collection and Museum.

== Gallery ==
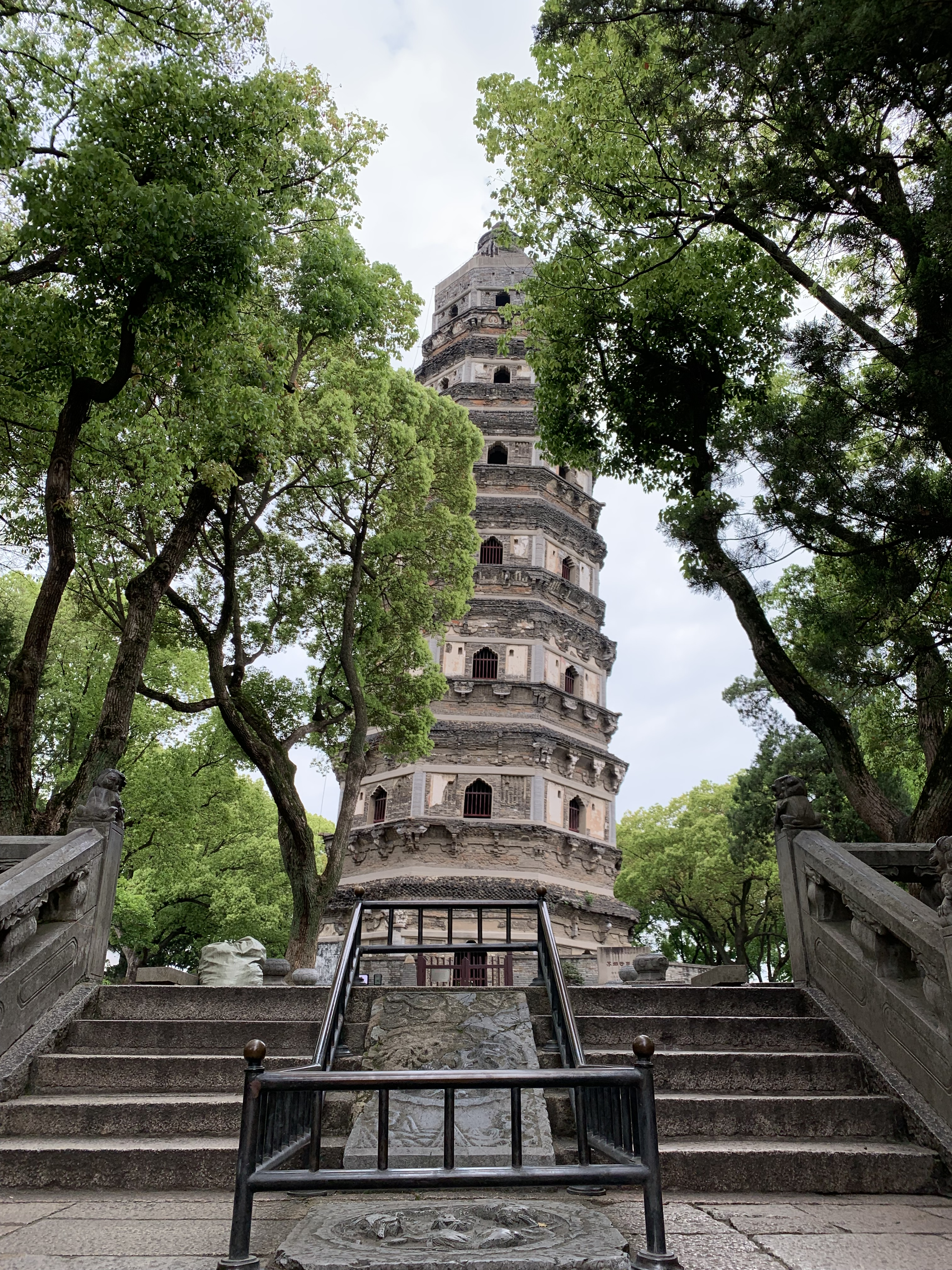
Tiger Hill Pagoda

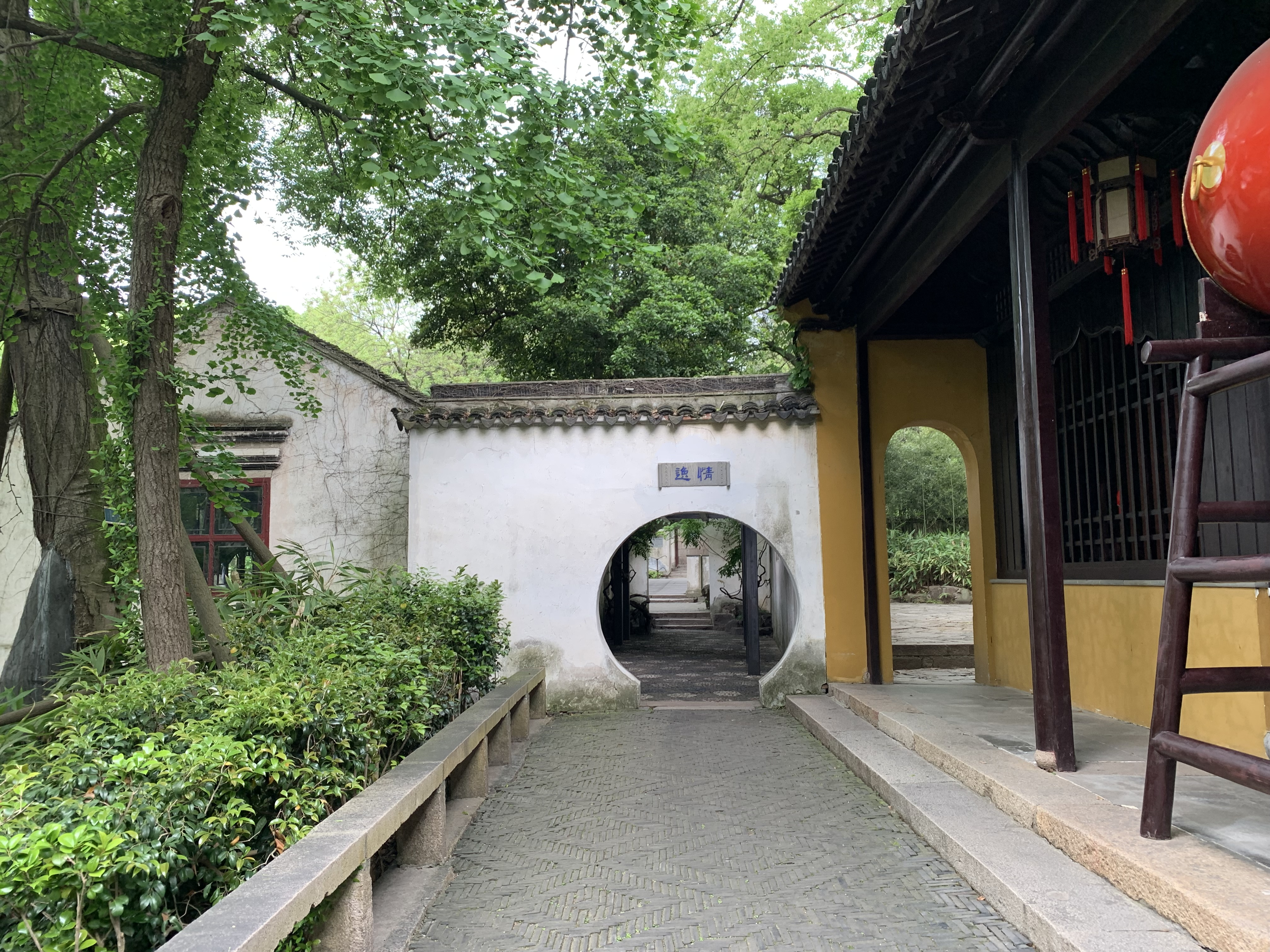
Interior of the Mahavira Hall

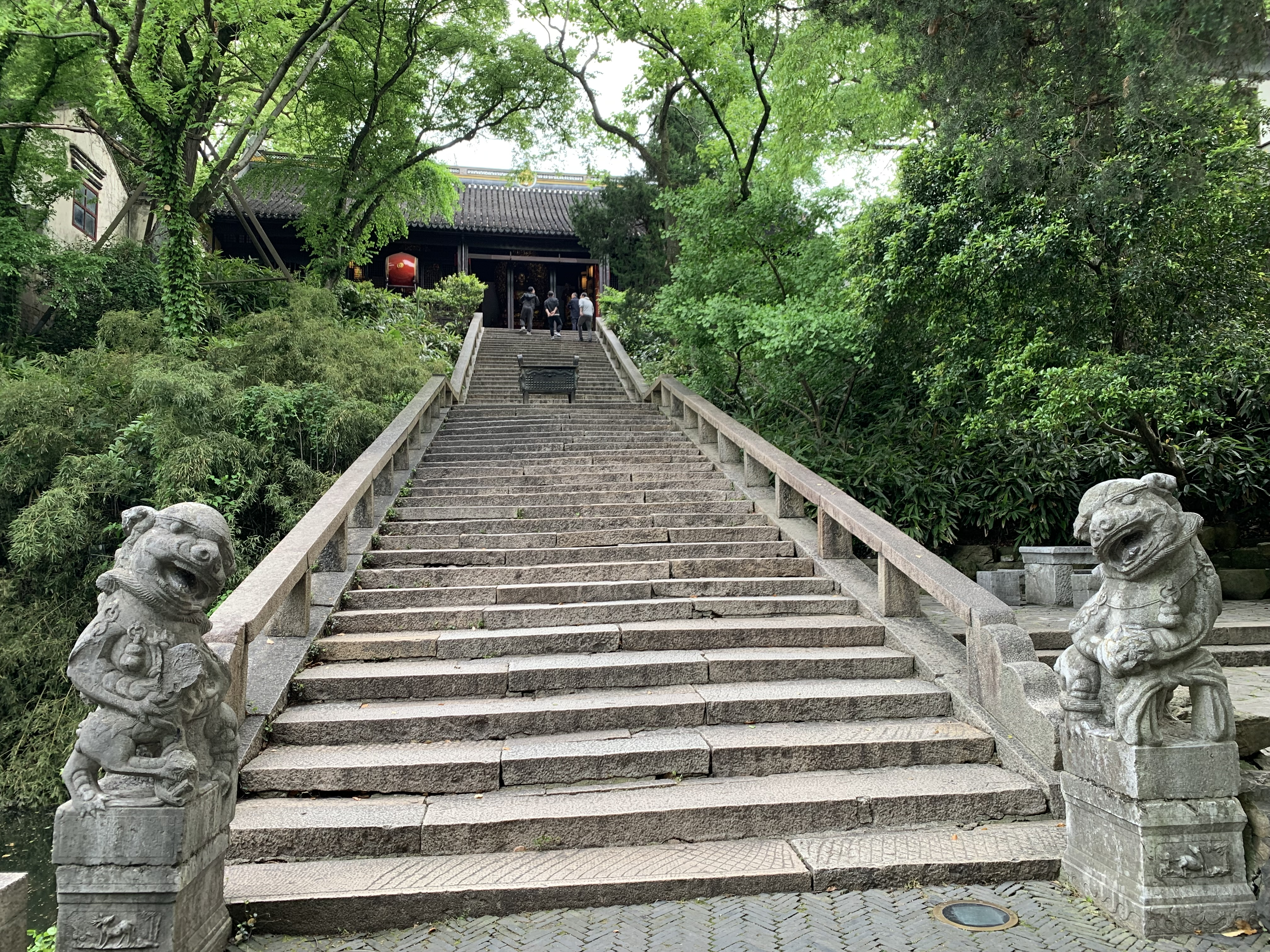
Stairway to the Mahavira Hall

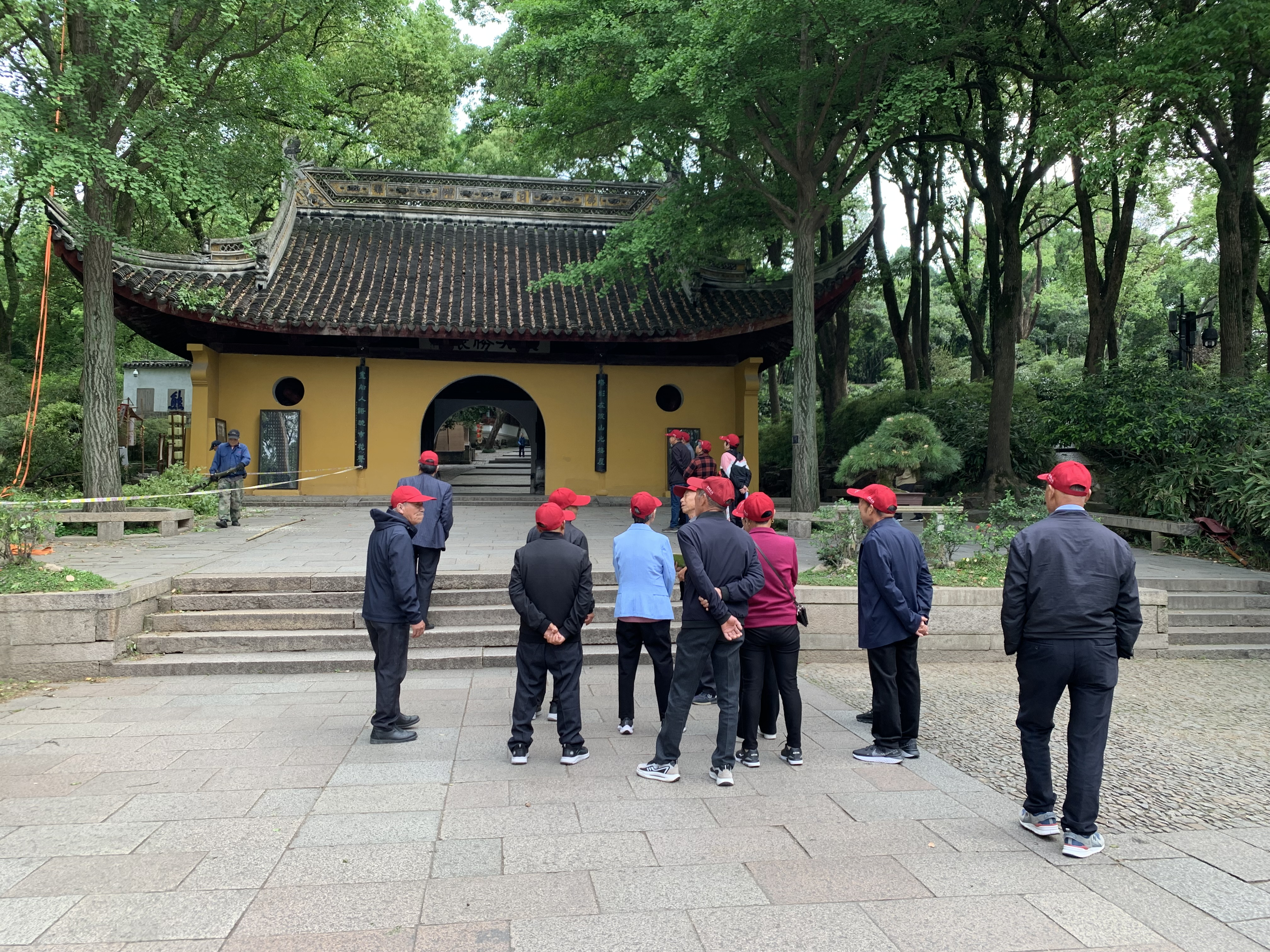
Visitors in front of the Broken Beam Hall

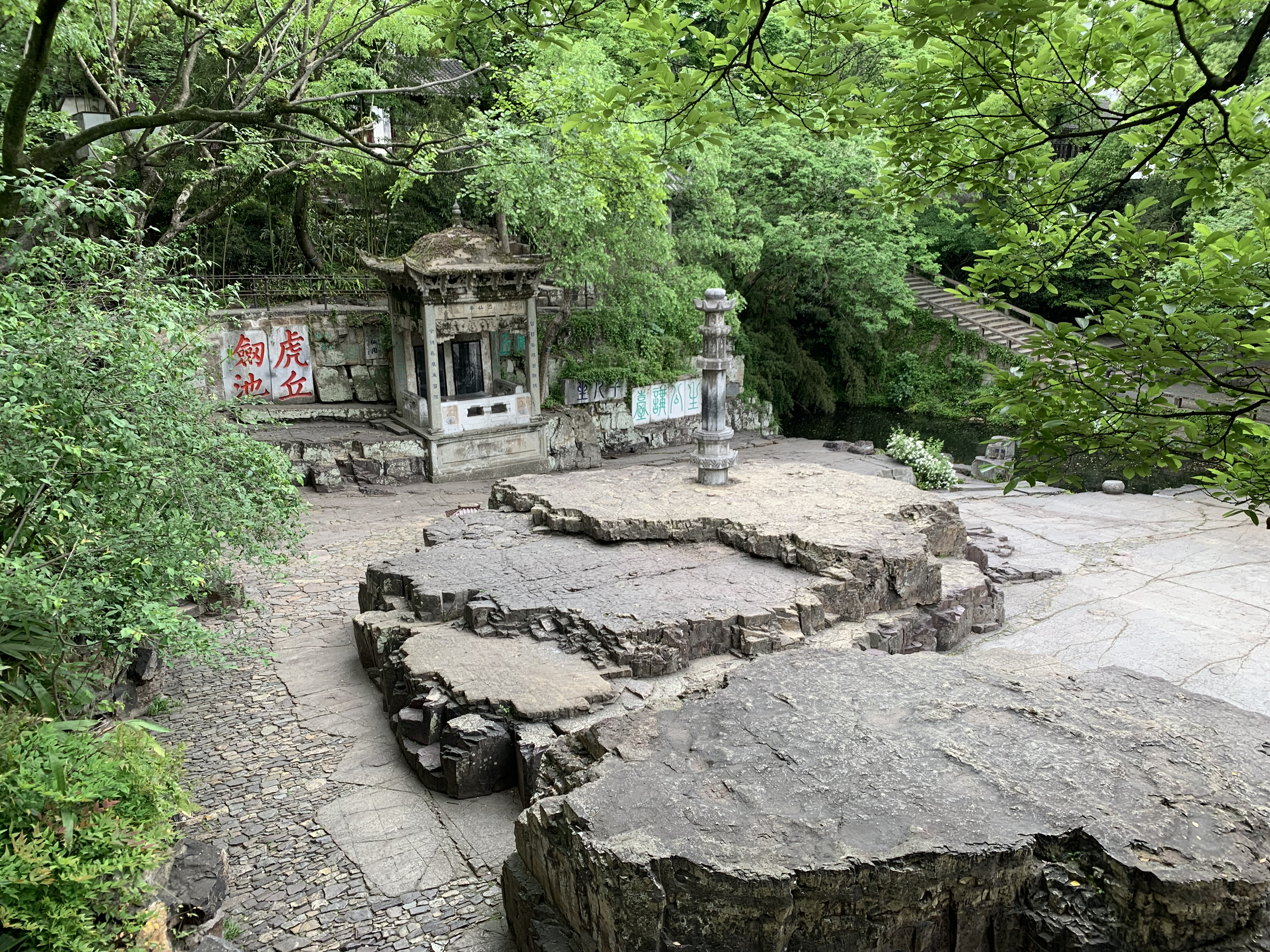
Thousand Person Rock

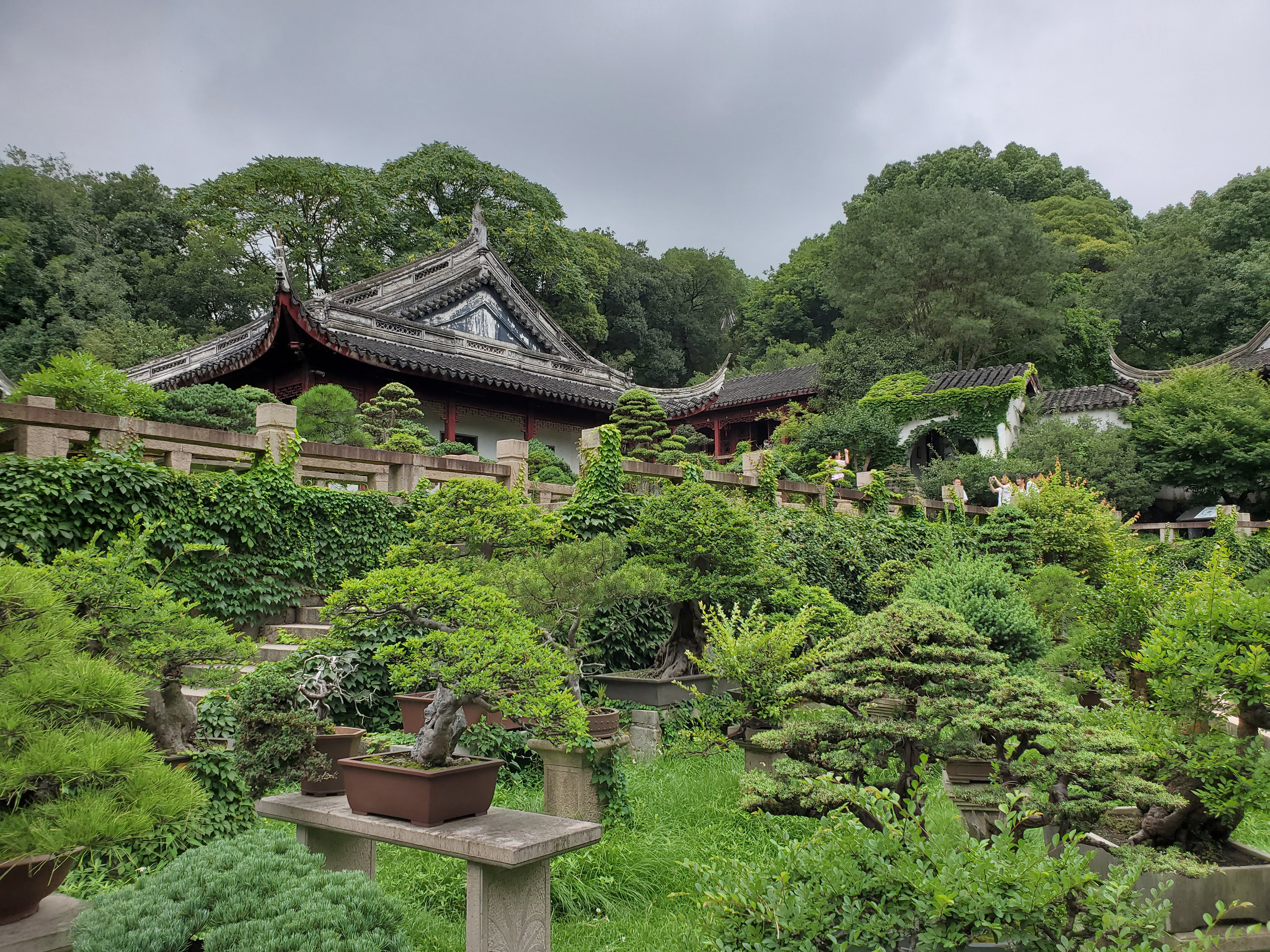
Penjing Collection

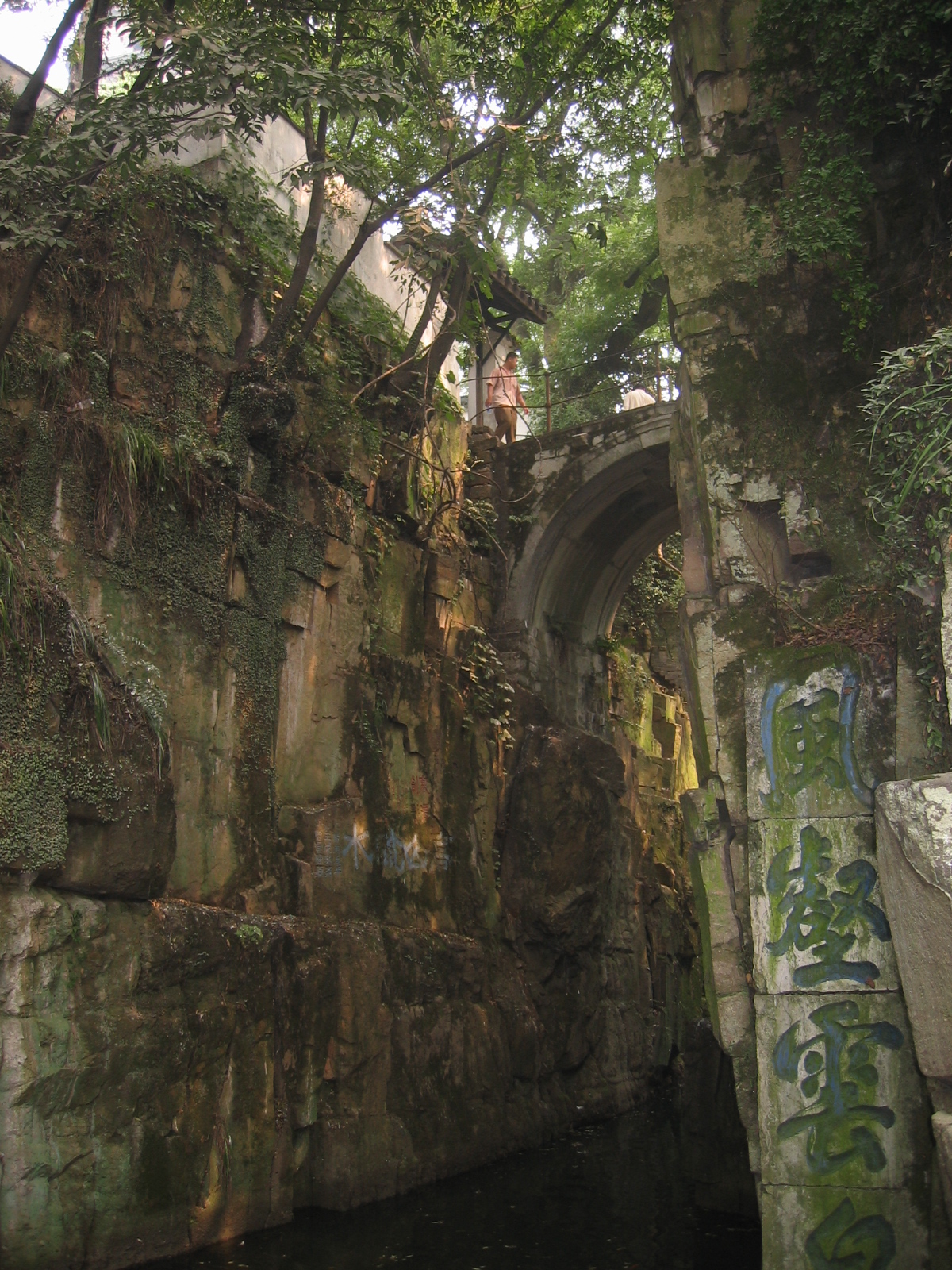
Sword Pond

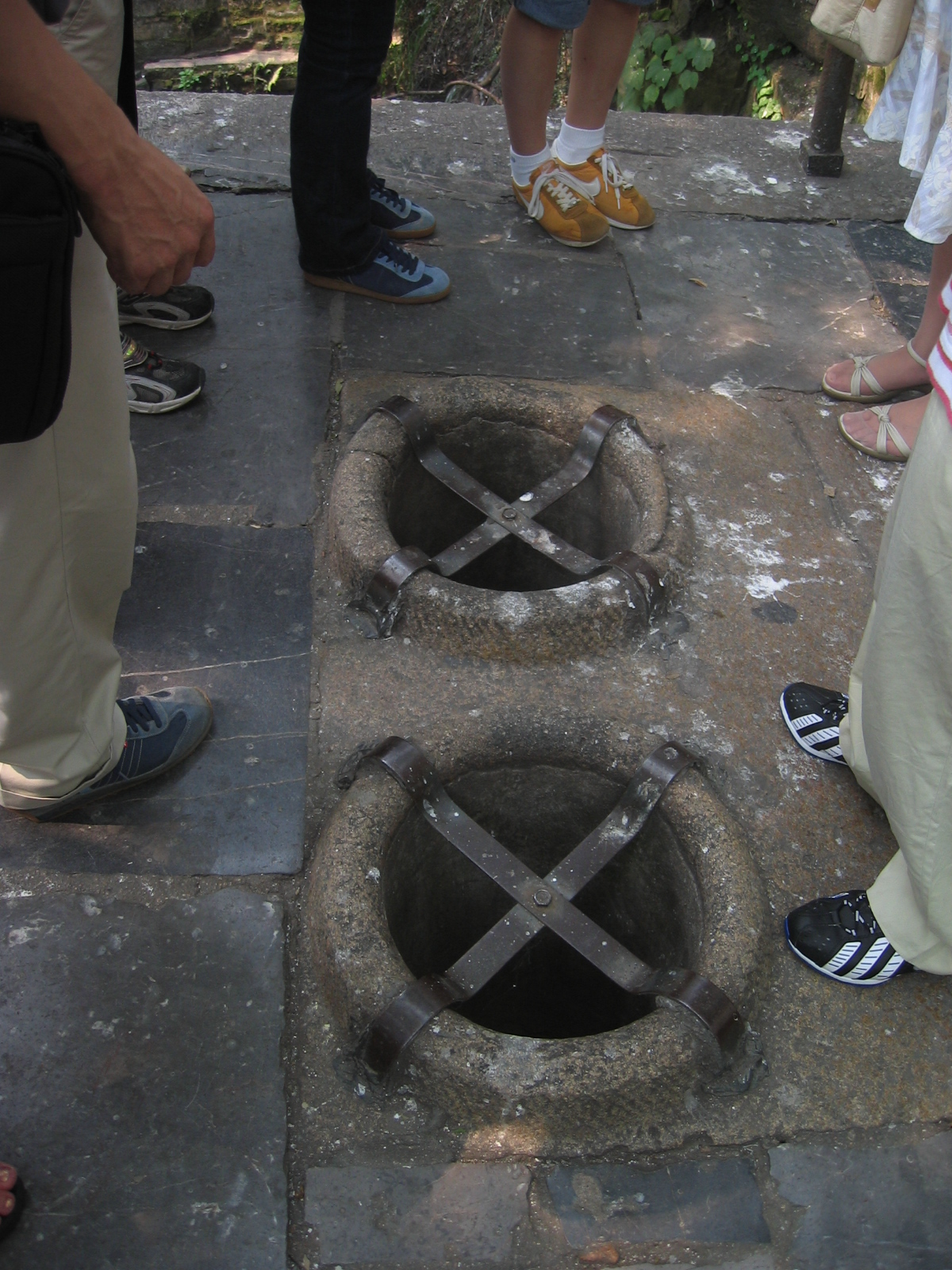
Double well

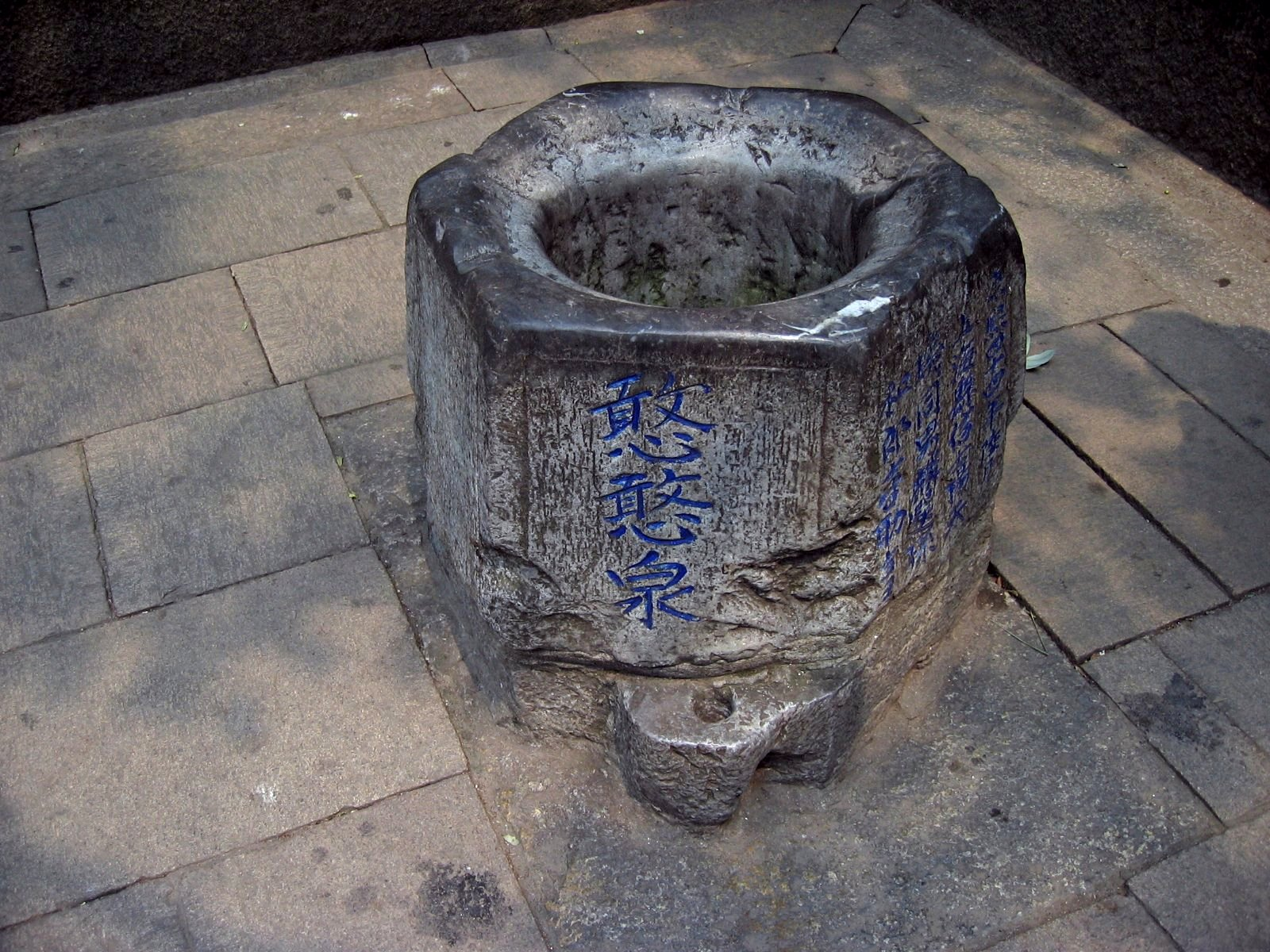
Hanhan Well

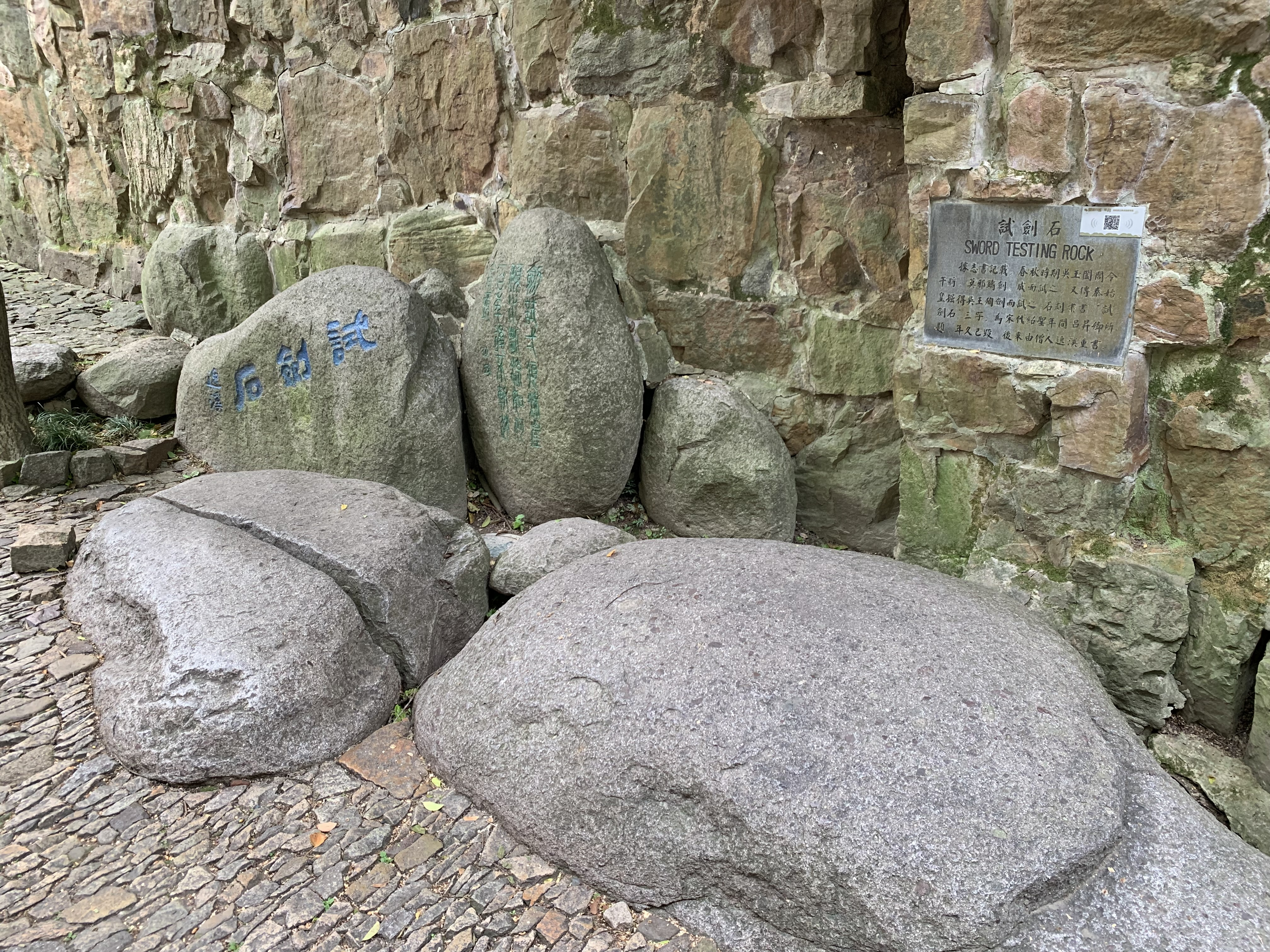
The Sword Testing Rock

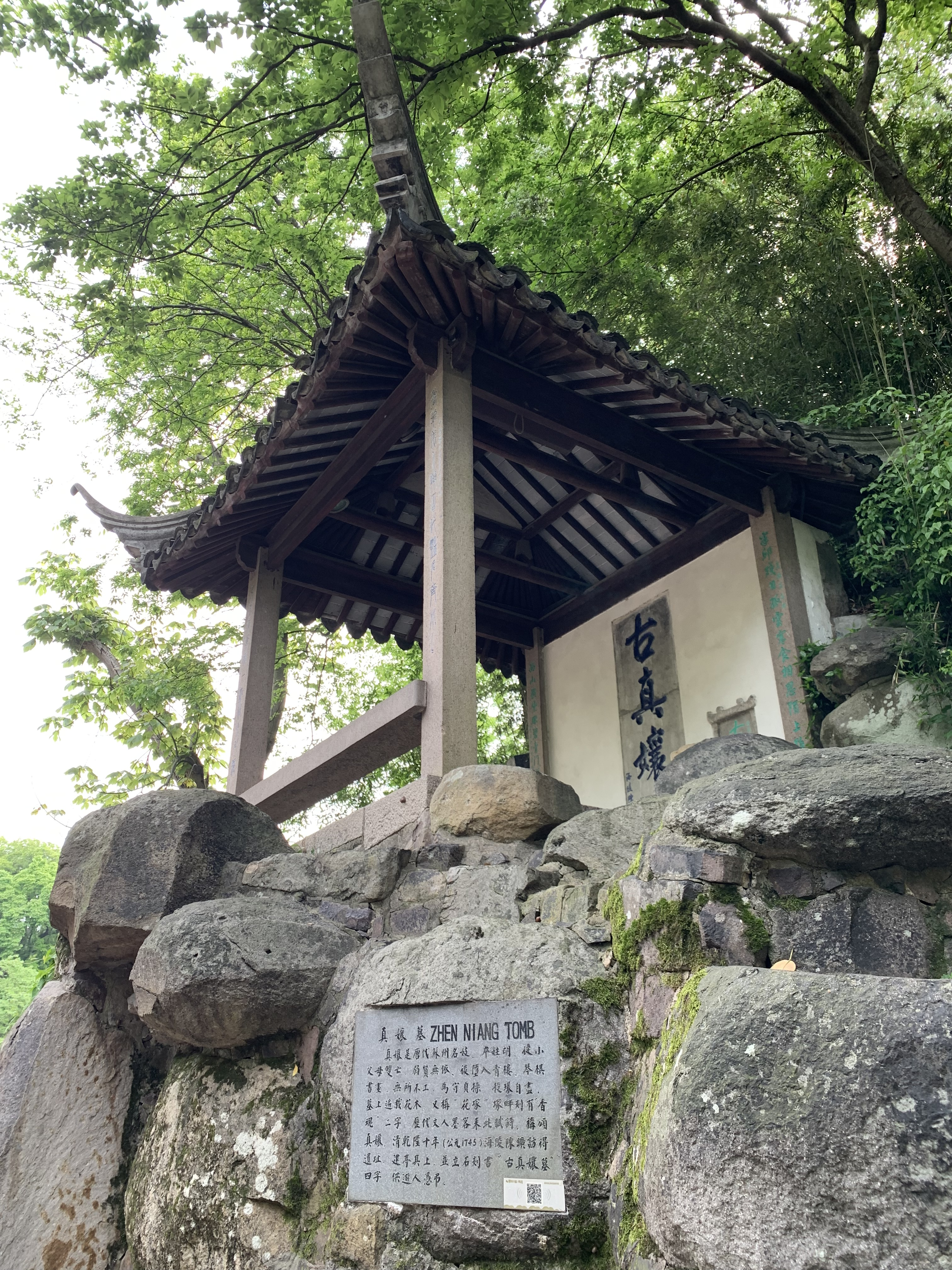
Zhen Niang's tomb

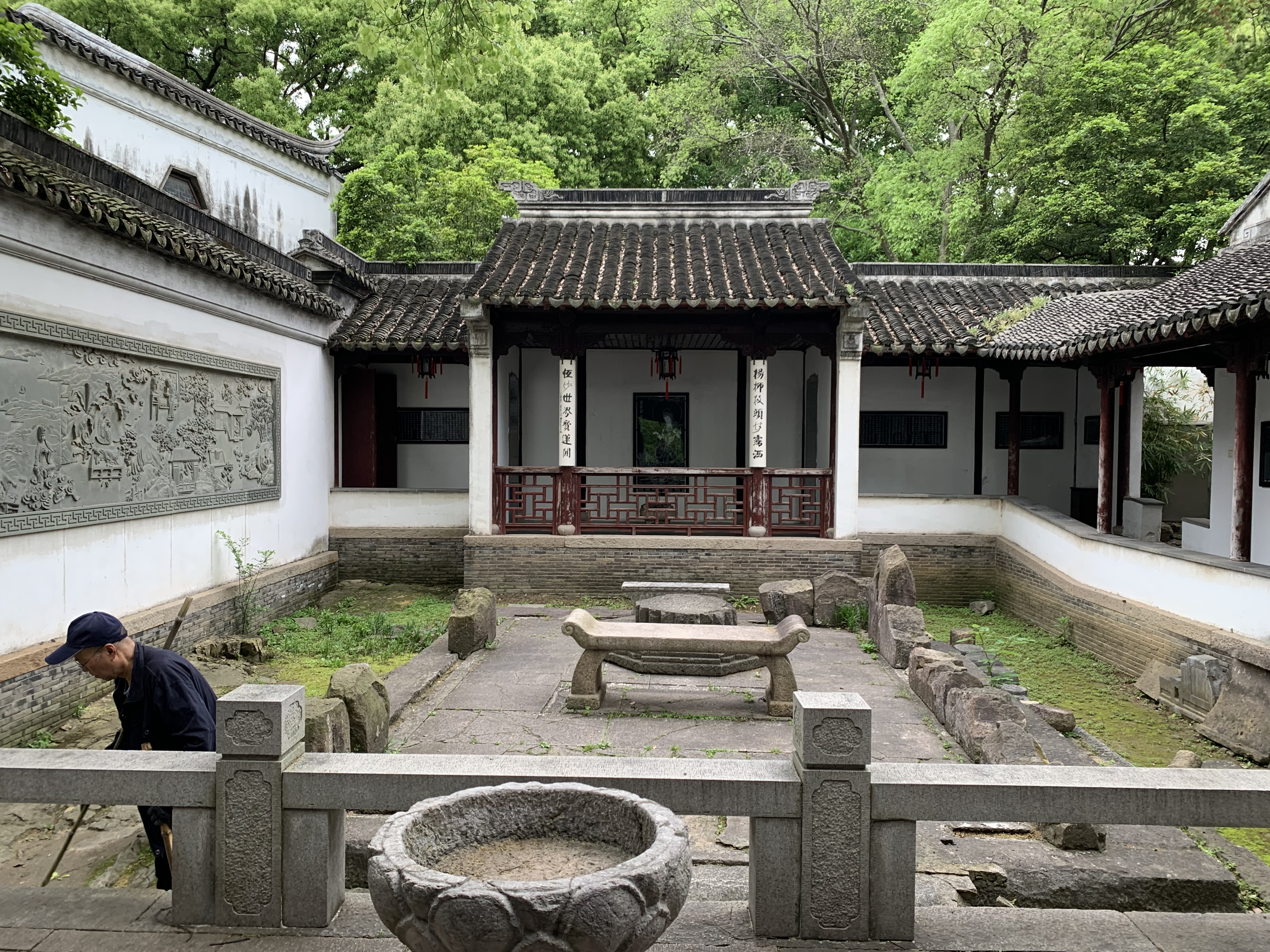
Chinese garden

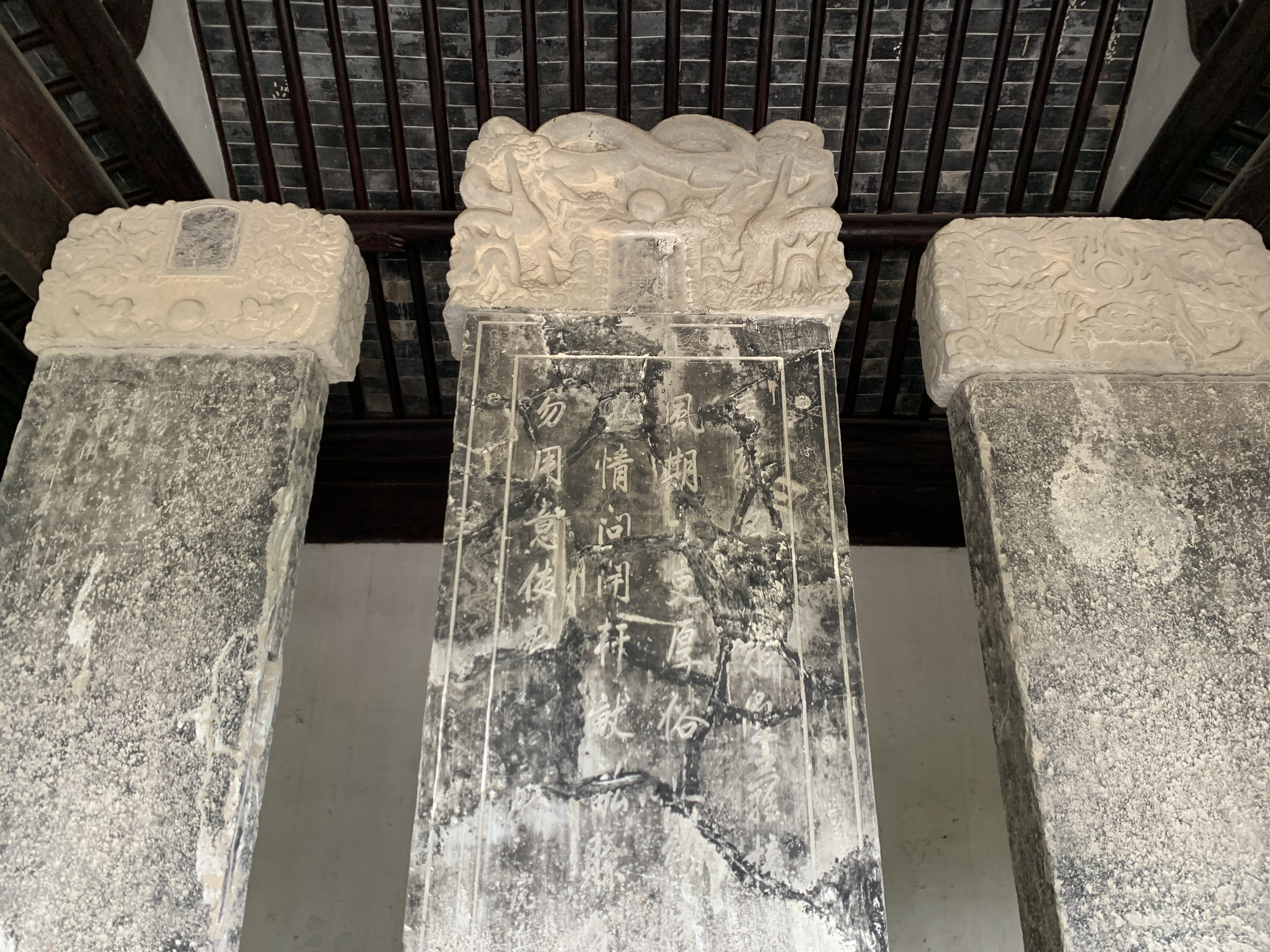
Stone steles

== See also ==
- List of Chinese gardens
- Penjing
- Suzhou
