= Tiger Hill Pagoda =

Pagoda in Suzhou, Jiangsu, China

Coordinates: 31°20′17″N 120°34′35″E

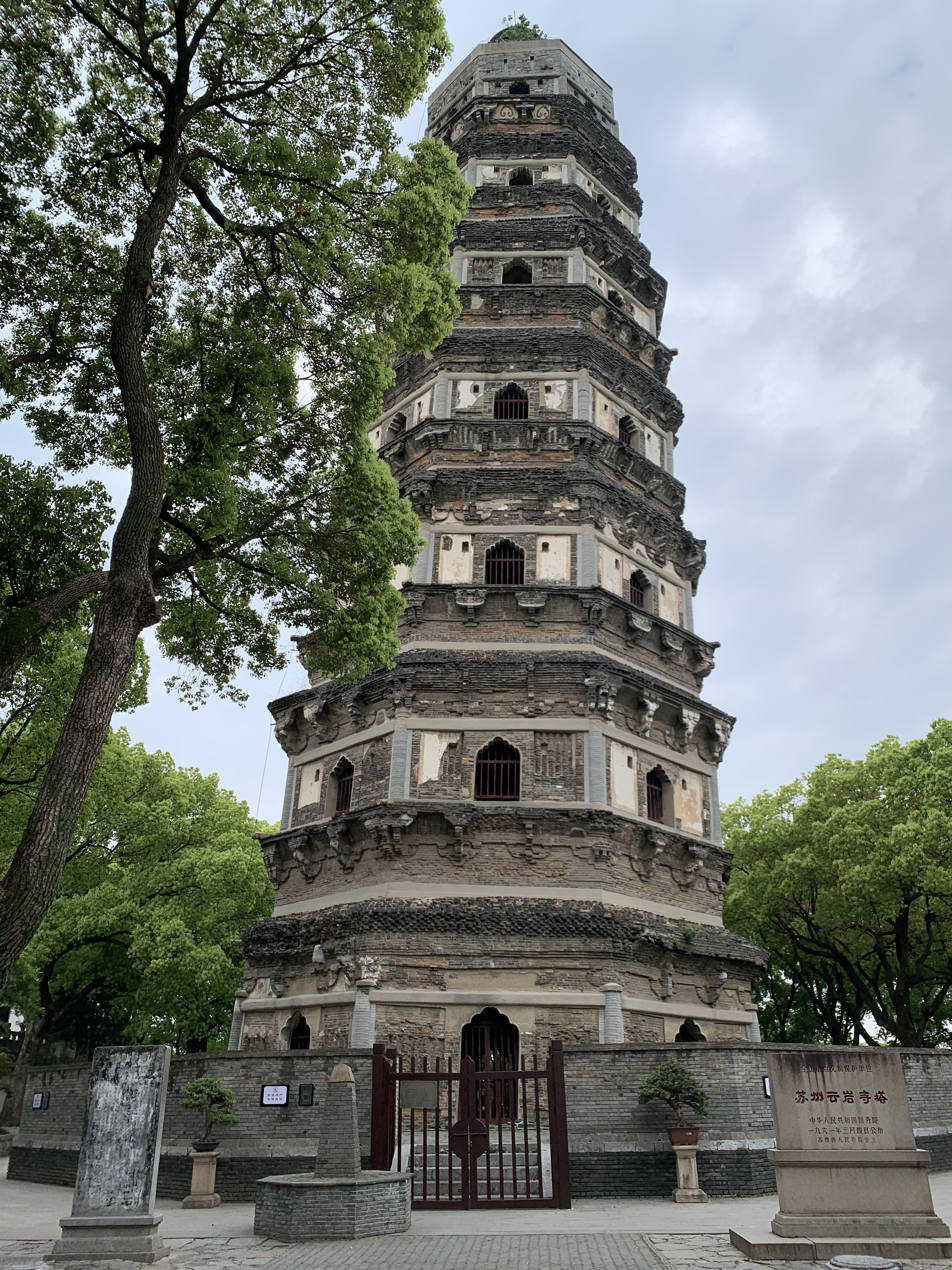
- Tiger Hill Pagoda in 2024
- Chinese: 虎丘塔
Transcriptions
Standard Mandarin
- Hanyu Pinyin: Hǔqiū tǎ
- Wade–Giles: Hu-ch'iu T'a
Wu
- Suzhounese: hou^{3} chieu^{1} thaeq^{7} [hǝu tɕʰʏ tʰaʔ]

Yunyan Pagoda
- Traditional Chinese: 雲巖寺塔
- Simplified Chinese: 云岩寺塔
Transcriptions
Standard Mandarin
- Hanyu Pinyin: Yúnyánsì tǎ
- Wade–Giles: Yün-yan-ssu T'a
Wu
- Romanization: yun^{2} nge^{2} zy^{6} thaeq^{7} [ɦyn ŋe zz tʰaʔ]

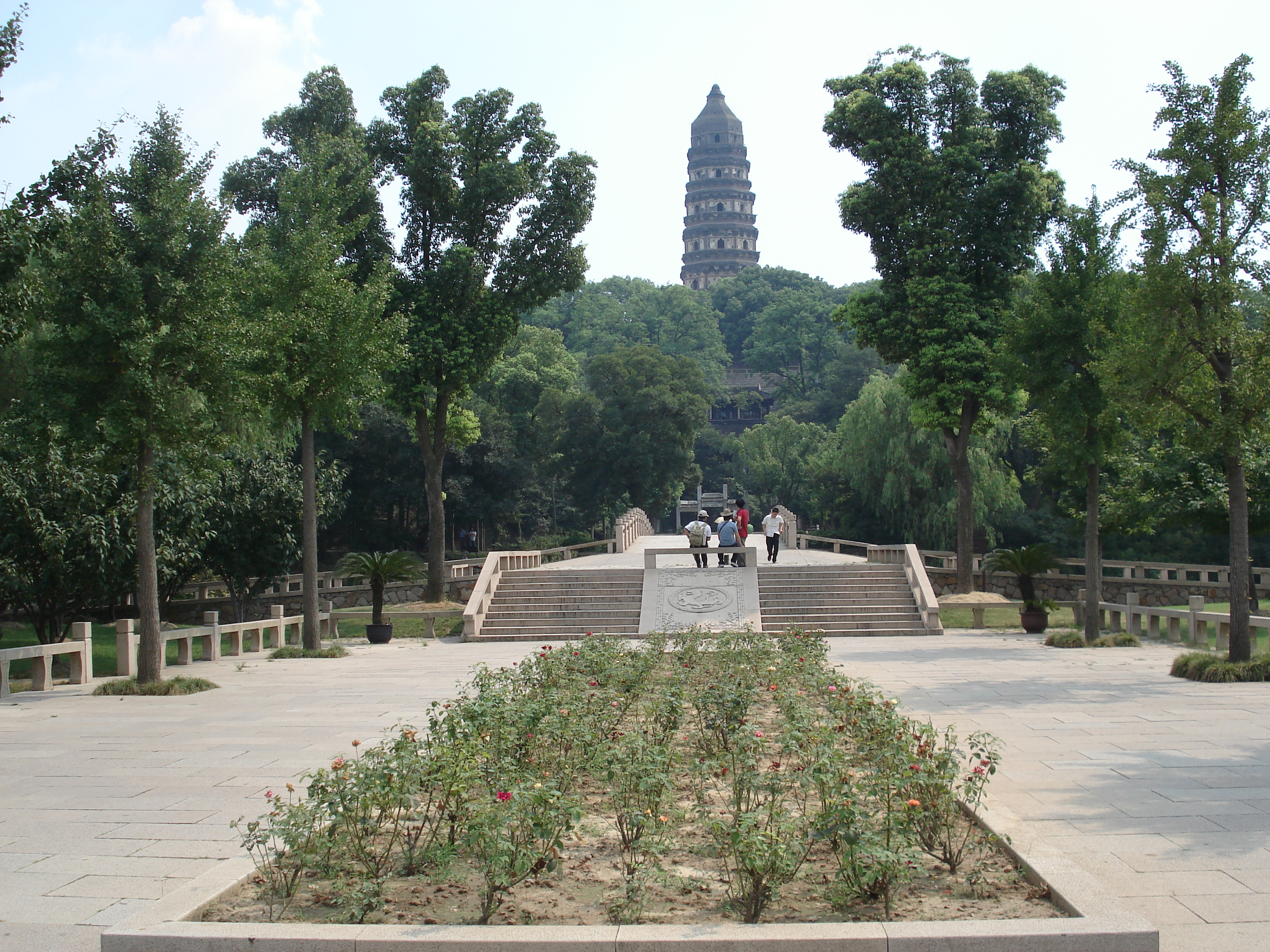
The pagoda as viewed from the bottom of the hill

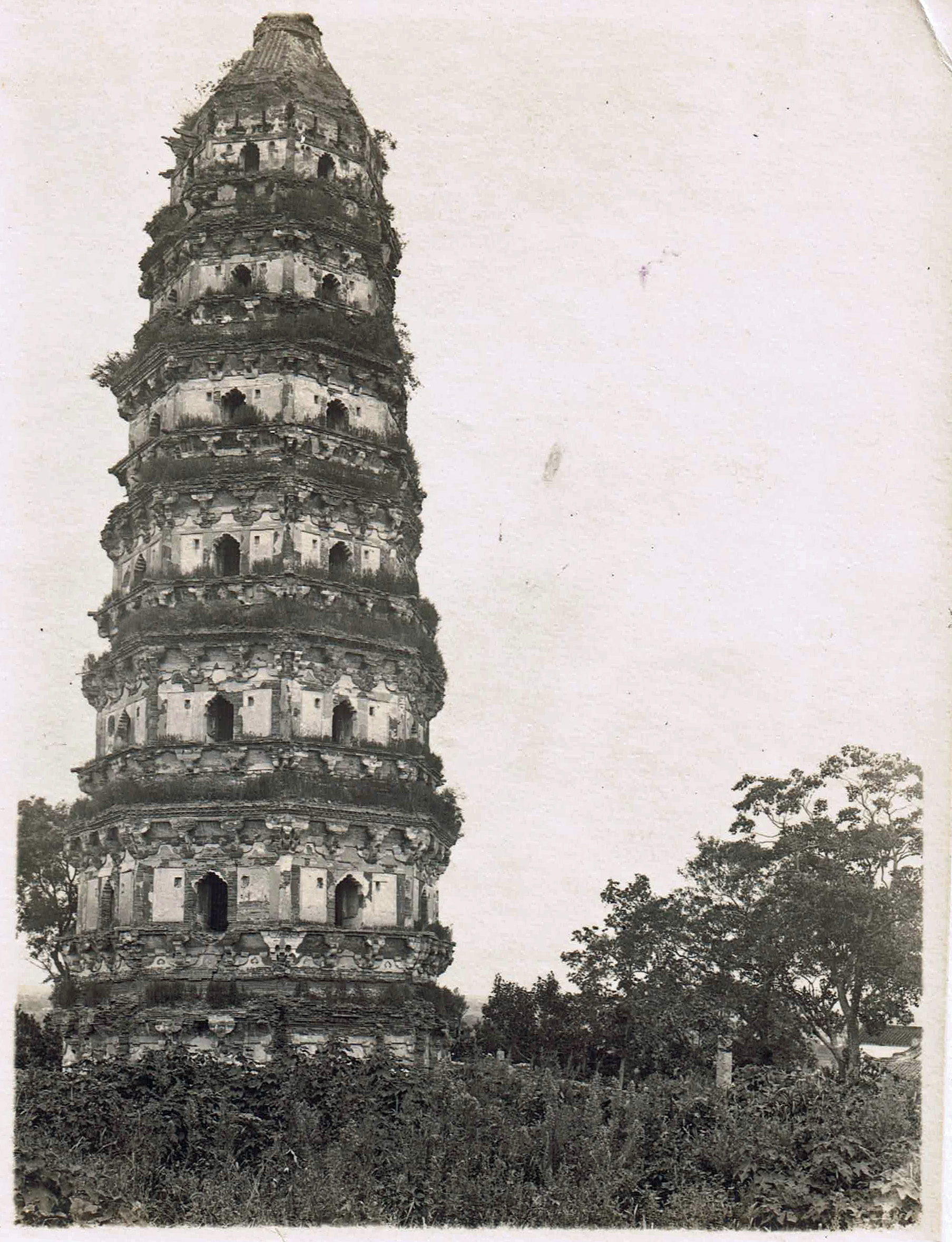
Tiger Hill Pagoda in October 1921

The Tiger Hill or Huqiu Pagoda, officially the Yunyan or Yunyan Temple Pagoda, is a Chinese pagoda situated on Tiger Hill (Huqiu) in Suzhou, Jiangsu Province, in eastern China. It is nicknamed the 'Leaning Tower of China'.

== History ==
The Tiger Hill Pagoda is the primary pagoda of the former Yunyan Temple, which was founded in 327 and refurbished for the last time in 1871 after the Taiping Rebellion. The temple suffered damage in successive wars and most of the temple was destroyed during the Second Sino-Japanese War and Chinese Civil War, after which it was abandoned. Some elements of the temple such as the formal entrance, the pagoda, and several other buildings and smaller shrines have survived, and now stand as landmarks throughout Tiger Hill Park.

Construction of the pagoda began in 907 during the Five Dynasties interregnum between the Tang and Song dynasties. At the time, Suzhou was ruled by the avidly Buddhist kings of Wuyue, based in Hangzhou. Construction was completed in 961, after the absorption of Wuyue into the Song Empire.

The uppermost stories of the pagoda were built as an addition during the reign of the Chongzhen Emperor (1628–1644), the last emperor of the Ming.

== Description ==
The Tiger Hill Pagoda rises to a height of 47 m (154 ft). The pagoda has seven stories and is octagonal in plan, and was built with a masonry structure designed to imitate wooden-structured pagodas prevalent at the time.

=== Leaning tower ===
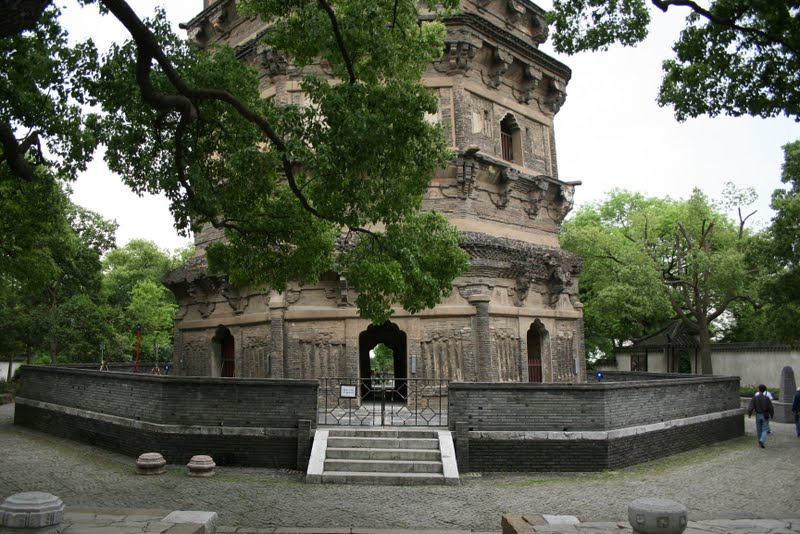
The base of the pagoda, with visible leaning (2009)

In more than a thousand years the pagoda has gradually slanted due to forces of nature. Now the top and bottom of the tower vary by 2.32 meters. The entire structure weighs some 7,000,000 kilograms (15,000,000 lb), supported by internal brick columns. However, the pagoda leans roughly 3 degrees due to the cracking of two supporting columns.

The pagoda leans because the foundation was originally half rock and half soil. In 1957, efforts were made to stabilize the pagoda and prevent further leaning. Concrete was also pumped into the soil forming a stronger foundation. During the reinforcement process, a stone casket containing Buddhist scriptures was found. The container had an inscription noting the completion date of the pagoda as the 17th day of the 12th lunar month of the 2nd year of the Jianlong Era (961).

== Present day ==
The Tiger Hill Pagoda is a designated Major National Historical and Cultural Site in Jiangsu. As of September 2010, public access to the top of the tower is no longer allowed.

== See also ==
- Architecture of the Song dynasty
- Major national historical and cultural sites (Jiangsu)
- Huzhu Pagoda
