= Xinshi Bridge =

Bridge in Suzhou, China

- Locale: Suzhou

Xinshi Bridge, or Xinshi Qiao (Chinese: 新市桥), is a bridge over the Grand Canal in Suzhou, China.
