= Suzhou Experimental High School =

Suzhou Experimental High School of Jiangsu Province 江苏省苏州实验中学

Location
- Suzhou, Jiangsu, China

Information
- School type: High school
- Founded: 1994
- Status: Open
- Authority: Jiangsu Provincial Education Commission
- Website: Suzhou Experimental High School of Jiangsu Province

Suzhou Experimental High School, officially the Suzhou Experimental High School of Jiangsu Province (simplified Chinese: 江苏省苏州实验中学; traditional Chinese: 江蘇省蘇州實驗中學; pinyin: Jiāngsū shěng Sūzhōu shíyàn zhōngxué) is located in Suzhou, Jiangsu, China. It was founded in 1994, have taken the official name of "Nanjing University Affiliated High School in Suzhou" (Chinese: 南京大学苏州附属中学) since 1996. The school become the key high schools in Jiangsu province in 1996. The school has modern teaching equipment, and was rebuilt in 2016. It has more than 1600 students and 160 faculty.
