= Suzhou =

Suzhou 苏州市; 蘇州市 Soochow
- Prefecture-level city
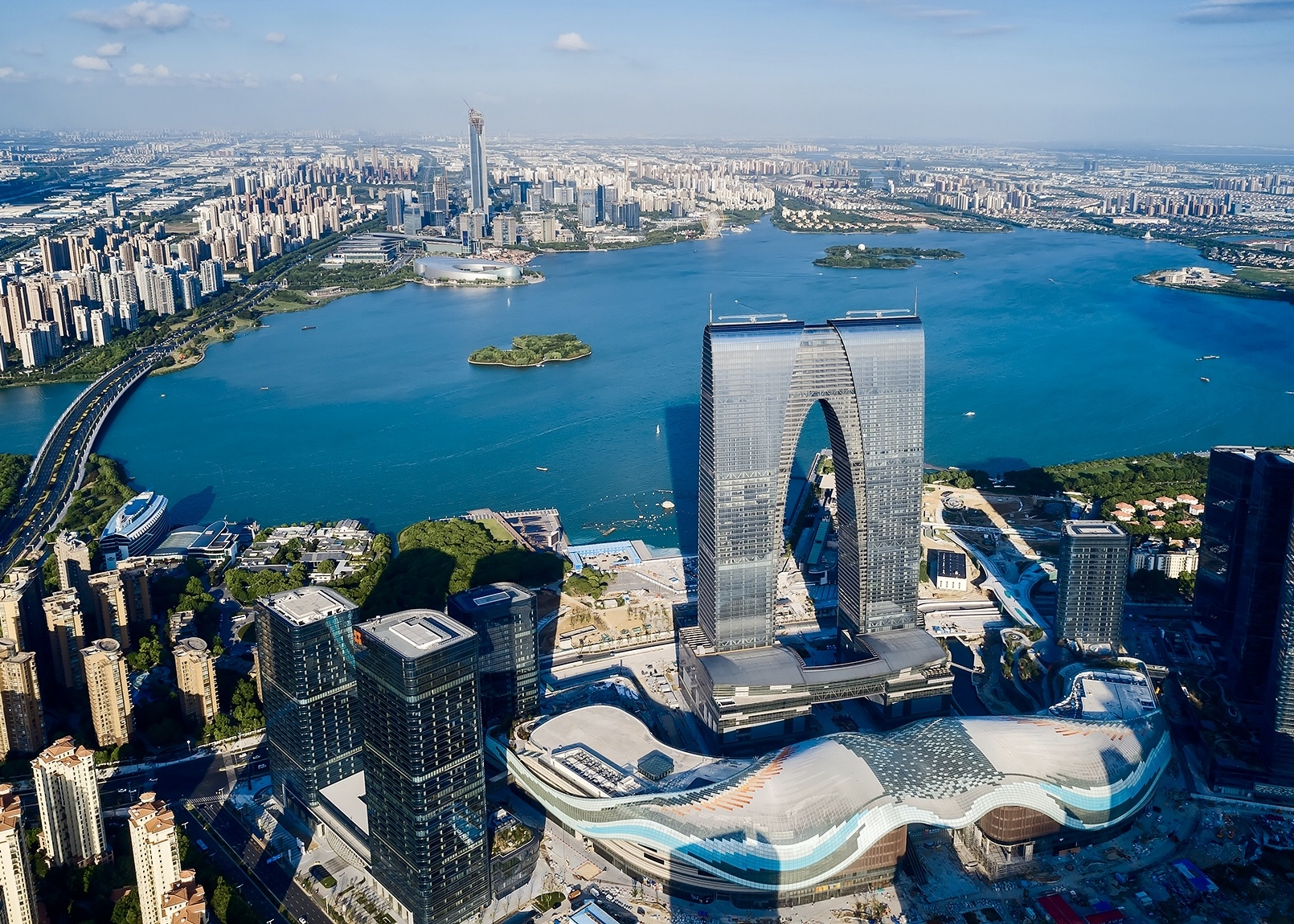
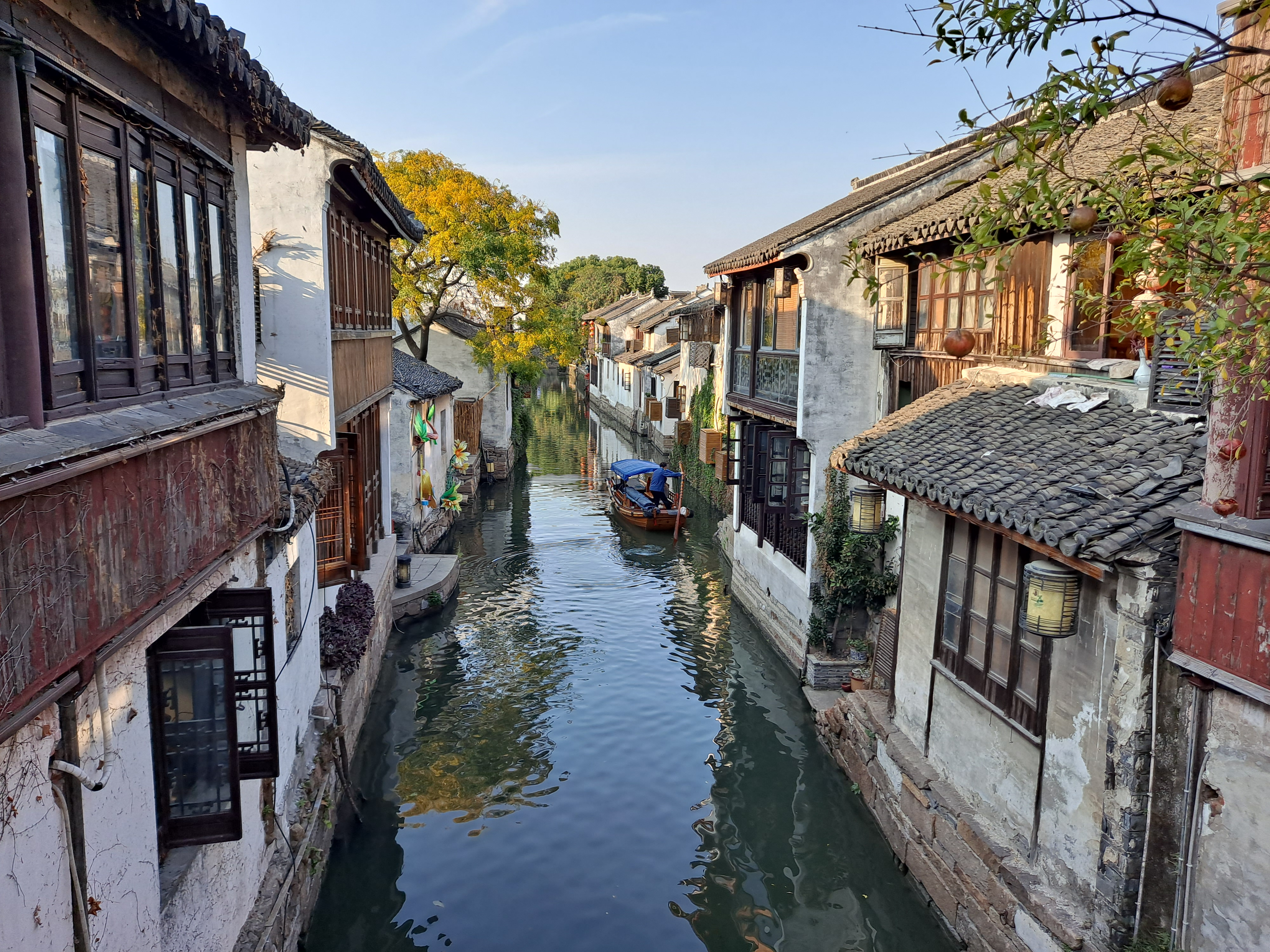
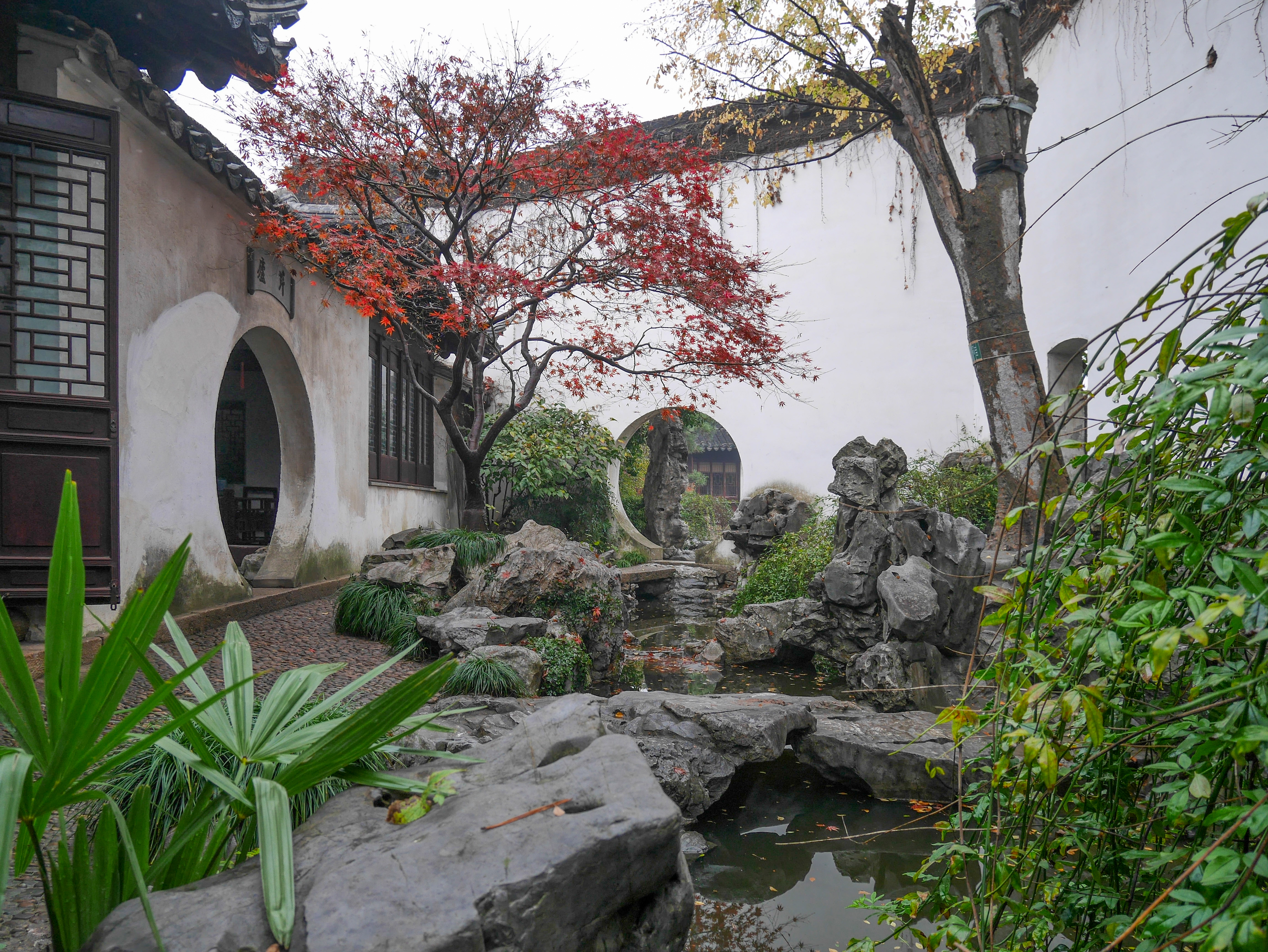
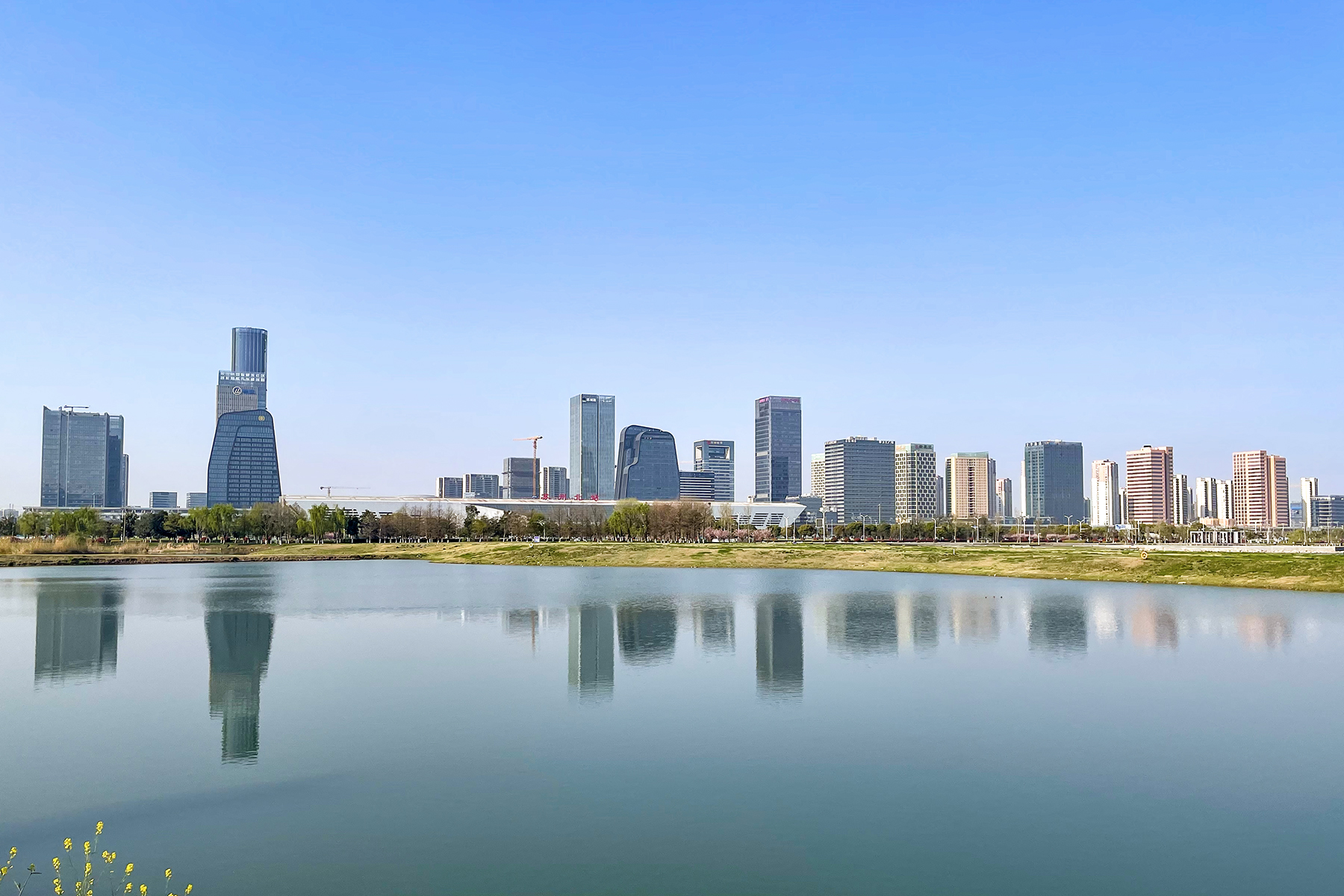
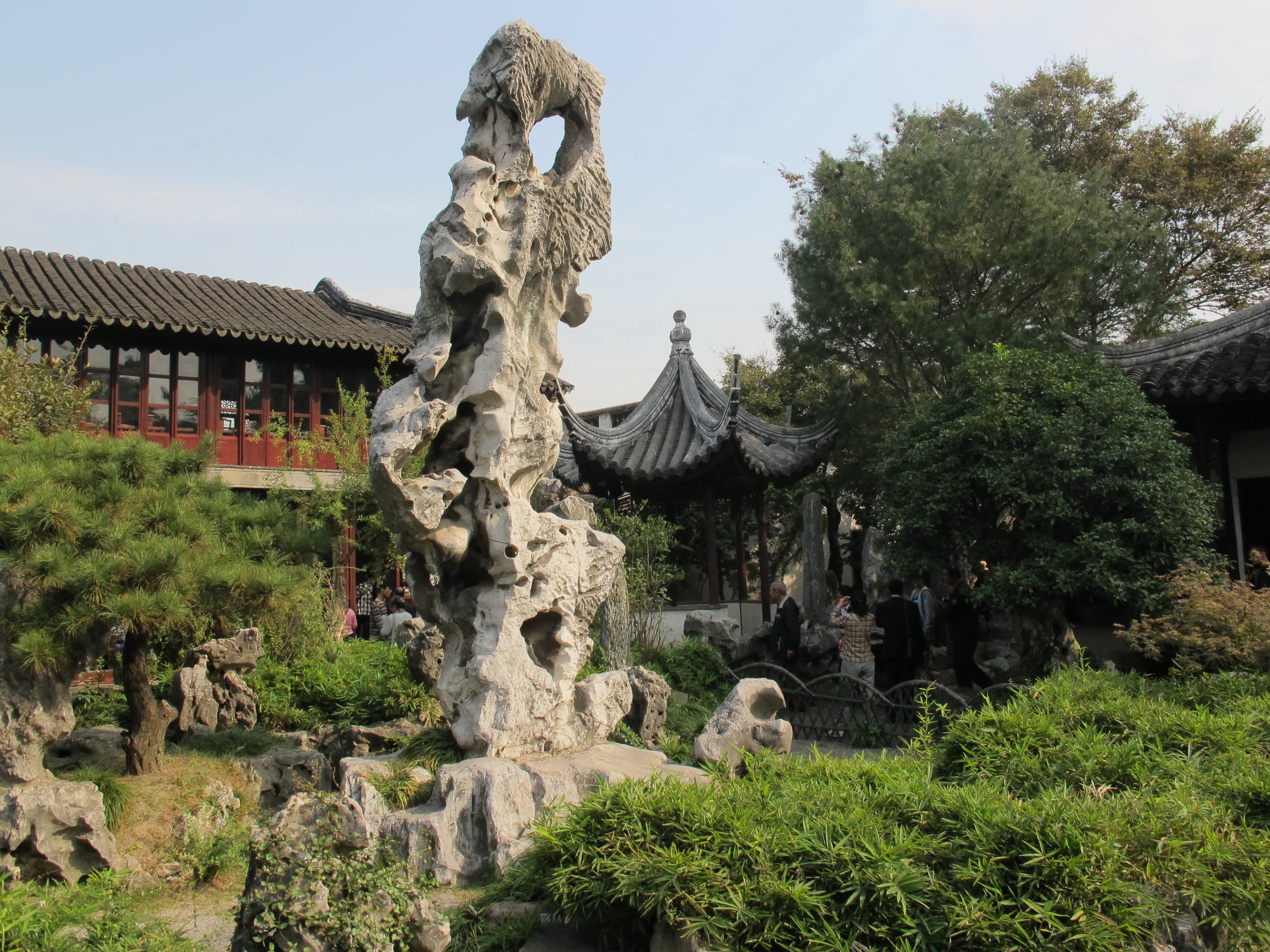
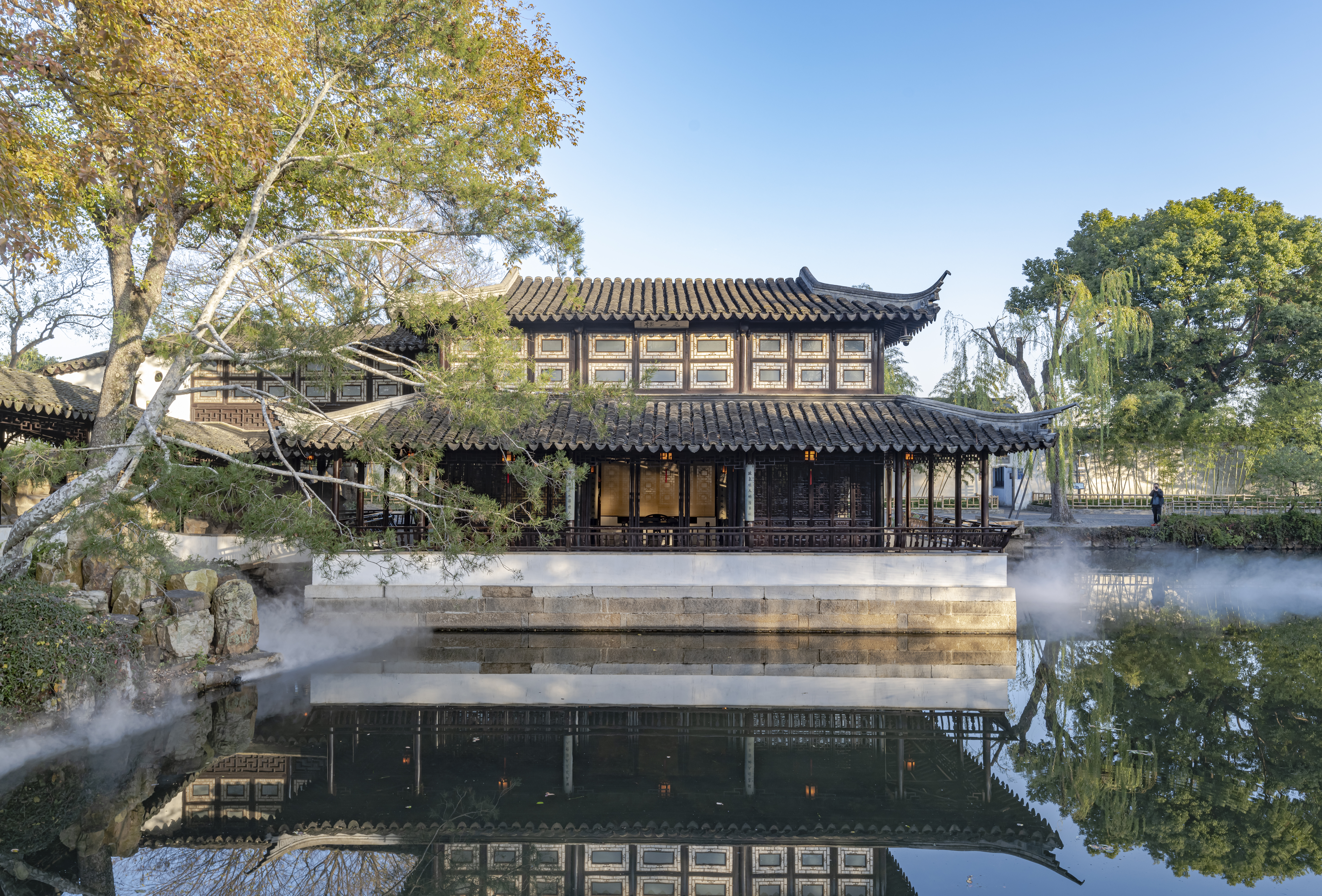
- Gate to the East at Suzhou Industrial Park Zhouzhuang Town Garden of Cultivation Suzhou HSR New Town Lingering Garden Humble Administrator's Garden

- Location of Suzhou in Jiangsu

- Location within China
- Coordinates (Suzhou municipal government): 31°18′00″N 120°37′10″E
- Country: China
- Province: Jiangsu
- County-level divisions: 11
- Established: 514 BC
- Municipal seat: Gusu District

Government
  - Type: Prefecture-level city
  - Party Secretary: Fan Bo
  - Mayor: Wang Wei

Area
  - Prefecture-level city: 8,657.32 km^{2} (3,342.61 sq mi)
  - Land: 6,093.92 km^{2} (2,352.88 sq mi)
  - Water: 2,394.50 km^{2} (924.52 sq mi)
  - Urban: 2,742.52 km^{2} (1,058.89 sq mi)
  - Metro: 12,493 km^{2} (4,824 sq mi)

Population (2020 census)
  - Prefecture-level city: 12,748,252
  - Density: 2,091.96/km^{2} (5,418.16/sq mi)
  - Urban: 6,715,559
  - Urban density: 2,448.68/km^{2} (6,342.06/sq mi)
- Demonym: Suzhounese

GDP(2025)
  - Prefecture-level city: CN¥ 2.77 trillion US$ 397.6 billion
  - Per capita: CN¥ 217,246; US$ 31,187
- Time zone: UTC+8 (Beijing Time)
- Postal code: 215000
- Area code: 512
- ISO 3166 code: CN-JS-05
- HDI (2015): 0.868– very high
- City flower: Osmanthus
- City tree: Camphor laurel
- Local Chinese variety: Wu: Northern Wu, esp. Suzhounese
- License plate prefix: 苏E and 苏U
- Website: www.suzhou.gov.cn

Suzhou
- "Suzhou" in Simplified (top) and Traditional (bottom) Chinese characters
- Simplified Chinese: 苏州
- Traditional Chinese: 蘇州
- Postal: Soochow
Transcriptions
Standard Mandarin
- Hanyu Pinyin: Sūzhōu
- Wade–Giles: Su^{1}-chou^{1}
- IPA: [sú.ʈʂóʊ]
other Mandarin
- Xiao'erjing: سُوژَوْ
Wu
- Wugniu: su^{1} tseu^{1}
- Suzhounese: sou^{1} tseu^{1}
- IPA: Suzhounese: [səu˦ tsøʏ] Shanghainese: [su˥ tsɤ˧]
Hakka
- Romanization: Sû-chû
Yue: Cantonese
- Yale Romanization: Sōujāu
- Jyutping: Sou^{1}-zau^{1}
- IPA: [sɔw˥.tsɐw˥]
Southern Min
- Hokkien POJ: Soo-ciŭ

Suzhou (Note: /suːˈdʒoʊ/; Chinese: 苏州; pinyin: Sūzhōu; Suzhounese: sou¹ tseu¹ [səu˦ tsøʏ˦], Mandarin: [sú.ʈʂóʊ]; previously romanized as Soochow) is a prefecture-level city in Jiangsu province, Eastern China. Suzhou is a major tourist destination and industrial hub of Eastern China, specializing in high-end manufacturing. Renowned as the cradle of Wu culture, Suzhou flourished as a hub of trade, arts, and intellectual life along the Grand Canal, helping shape China's economic and cultural development for centuries. The city is internationally famous for its classical gardens, which harmonize architecture, water, rocks, and plants into poetic expressions of nature. Long admired for its silk production, refined cuisine, and lyrical Kunqu opera, Suzhou has been praised in Chinese poetry, along with Hangzhou, as "paradise on earth," a reputation that endures today as the city blends its timeless canals, whitewashed lanes, and scholarly heritage with modern industries. Suzhou is part of the Yangtze Delta megalopolis.

Founded in 514 BC, Suzhou rapidly grew in size by the Eastern Han dynasty, mostly due to emigration from northern China. From the 10th century onwards, it has been an important economic, cultural, and commercial center, as well as the largest non-capital city in the world, until it was overtaken by Shanghai in approximately 1850. Since the reform and opening up began in 1978, Suzhou attained GDP growth rates of about 14% in 35 years. In 2023, Suzhou had 5 million registered residents. Suzhou is the 33rd global city by scientific output according to Nature Index 2025. The city is home to universities, including Soochow University, Suzhou University of Science and Technology, Xi'an Jiaotong–Liverpool University, and Changshu Institute of Technology.

The city's tourist attractions include canals, stone bridges, pagodas, and gardens. Along with Hangzhou, it is sometimes described as heaven on earth. The Classical Gardens of Suzhou were added to the list of the UNESCO World Heritage Sites in 1997 and 2000.

== Names ==
During the Zhou dynasty, a settlement known as Gusu after nearby Mount Gusu (Chinese: 姑苏山; pinyin: Gūsūshān) became the capital of the state of Wu. From this role, it also came to be called Wu as well. In 514 BC, King Helü of Wu established a new capital nearby at Helü City, and this grew into the modern city. During the Warring States period, Helü City continued to serve as the local seat of government. From the areas it administered, it became known as Wuxian (lit. "Wu County") and Wujun ("Wu Commandery"). Under the Qin, it was known as Kuaiji after its greatly enlarged commandery, which was named for the reputed resting place of Yu the Great near modern Shaoxing in Zhejiang.

The name "Suzhou" was first officially used for the city in AD 589 during the Sui dynasty. Su (蘇 or 苏) in its name is a contraction of the old name Gusu. It refers to "Satisfied place" in the Old Yue language. The zhou 州 originally meant something like a province or county (cf. Guizhou), but often came to be used metonymously for the capital of such a region (cf. Guangzhou, Hangzhou, etc.). Suzhou is the Hanyu Pinyin spelling of the Putonghua pronunciation of the name. Prior to the adoption of pinyin, it was variously romanized as Soo-chow, Suchow, or Su-chow.

== History ==
Suzhou, the cradle of Wu culture, is one of the oldest towns in the Yangtze Basin. By the Spring and Autumn period of the Zhou, local Baiyue tribes named the Gou Wu are recorded living in the area which would become the modern city of Suzhou. These tribes formed villages on the edges of the hills above the wetlands surrounding Lake Tai.

Sima Qian's Records of the Grand Historian records traditional accounts that the Zhou lord Taibo established the state of Wu at nearby Wuxi during the 11th century BC, civilizing the local people and improving their agriculture and mastery of irrigation. The Wu court later moved to Gusu within the area of modern Suzhou. In 514 BC, (Note: The old editions of the Britannica give the erroneous date of AD 484.) King Helü of Wu relocated his court nearby and called the settlement Helü City after himself. His minister Wu Zixu was closely involved with its planning, and it was this site that grew into present-day Suzhou. The height of his tower on Gusu Hill (Gusutai) passed into Chinese legend. In 496 BC, King Helü was buried at Tiger Hill. In 473 BC, Wu was defeated and annexed by Yue, a kingdom to its southeast; Yue was annexed in turn by Chu in 306 BC. Remnants of the ancient kingdom include pieces of its 2,500-year-old city wall and the gate through it at Pan Gate.

The city was originally laid out according to a symbolic three-by-three grid of nine squares, with the royal palace occupying the central position.

During the Warring States period, Suzhou was the seat of Wu County (吳縣, Wú xiàn) and Commandery(吳郡, Wú jùn). Following the Qin Empire's conquest of the area in 222 BC, it was made the capital of Kuaiji Commandery, including lands stretching from the south bank of the Yangtze to the unconquered interior of Minyue in southern Zhejiang. Amid the collapse of the Qin, Kuaiji's governor Yin Tong attempted to organize his own rebellion only to be betrayed and executed by Xiang Liang and his nephew Xiang Yu, who launched their own rebellion from the city.

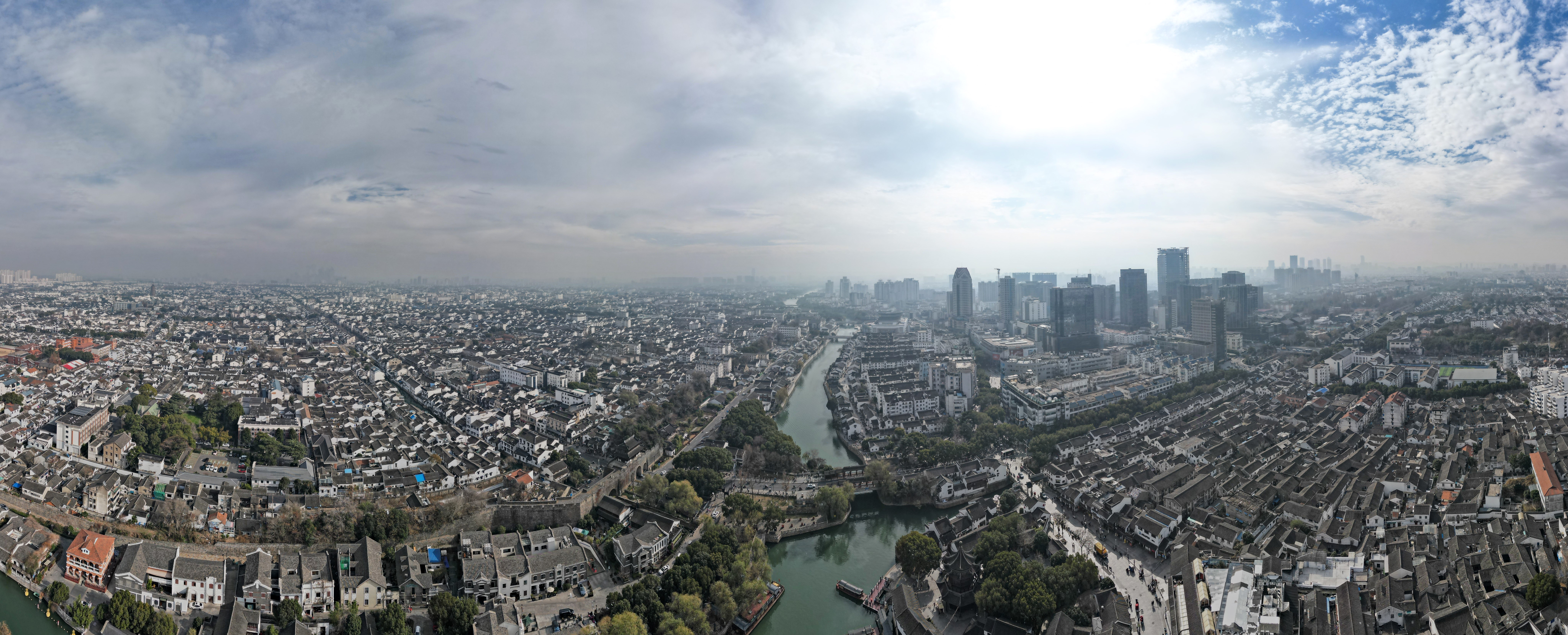
Aerial panorama of Suzhou in 2023 and the Grand Canal that runs through it

When the Grand Canal was completed, Suzhou found itself strategically located on a major trade route, serving as the regional metropolis of industry and foreign commerce on the southeastern coast of China. During the Tang dynasty, the great poet Bai Juyi constructed the Shantang Canal (better known as "Shantang Street") to connect the city with Tiger Hill for tourists. In AD 1035, the Suzhou Confucian Temple was founded by famed poet and writer Fan Zhongyan. It became a venue for the imperial civil examinations and then developed into the modern Suzhou High School in the 1910s.

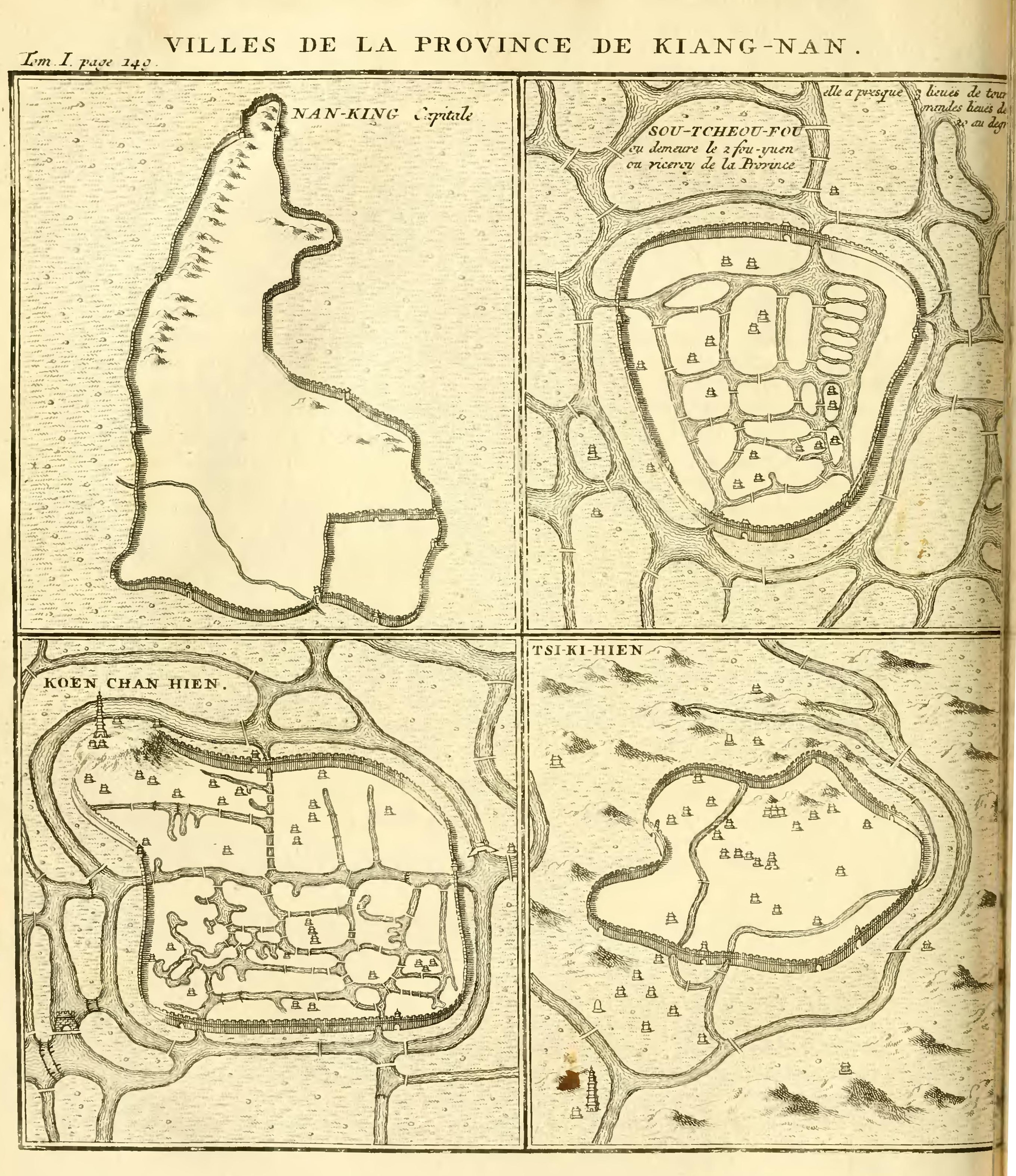
"Sou-tcheou-foo" & other towns of "Kiang-nan" in Du Halde's 1736 Description of China, based on accounts by Jesuit missionaries

After February 1130, riots and unrest disrupted Suzhou.

After 1229, Suzhou prefecture became a commercial center of cities. In 1356, Suzhou became the site of a capital of Zhang Shicheng, King of Wu. In 1367, Zhang's rival Zhu Yuanzhang took the city after a 10-month siege. Zhu – who was soon to proclaim himself the first emperor of the Ming dynasty – demolished the old city walls at the center of Suzhou's walled city and imposed crushing taxes on the city and prefecture's powerful families. Despite the heavy taxation and the forced exile of some prominent citizens to the south, Suzhou was soon prosperous again. During the early Ming, Suzhou Prefecture supervised the Yangtze shoals which later became Shanghai's Chongming Island. For centuries the city, with its surroundings as an economic base, represented an extraordinary source of tax revenue.

When the shipwrecked Korean official Choe Bu had a chance to see much of Eastern China from Zhejiang to Liaoning on his way home in 1488, he described Suzhou in his travel report as exceeding every other city. Under the Ming dynasty, Suzhou was a prosperous commercial center; scholar-officials constructed the area's most famous private gardens during this period in a "Jiangnan style" copied at the time by Shanghai's Yu Garden.

It was upgraded to a prefecture Fu at Suzhou. The rebels captured the prefecture in 1860. Many of its former buildings and gardens were "almost... a heap of ruins" by the time of their recovery by Charles Gordon's Ever-Victorious Army in November 1863. Nonetheless, by 1880, its population was estimated to have recovered to about 500,000, which remained stable for the next few decades. In the late 19th century, the town was particularly known for its wide range of silks and its Chinese-language publishing industry. The town was first opened to direct foreign trade by the Treaty of Shimonoseki ending the First Sino-Japanese War and by the most favored nation clauses of earlier unequal treaties with the Great Powers. The new expatriates opened a European-and-Chinese school in 1900 and the Suzhou railway station, connecting it with Shanghai, opened on 16 July 1906. Just prior to World War I, there were 7000 silk looms in operation, as well as a cotton mill and a large trade in rice.

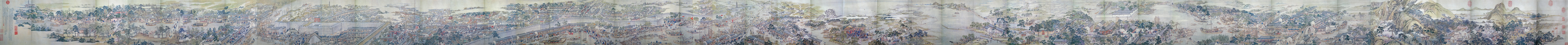
Excerpt from Prosperous Suzhou by Xu Yang, small section of a 1225 cm (482 in) panoramic painting of the city in 1759

As late as the early 20th century, much of the city consisted of islands connected by rivers, creeks, and canals to the surrounding countryside. Prior to their demolition, the city walls ran in a circuit of about 10 miles (16 km) with four large suburbs lying outside. The Japanese invaded in 1937, and many gardens were again devastated by the end of the war. In the early 1950s, restoration was done on the Humble Administrator's Garden and the Lingering Garden.

== Administrative divisions ==
Suzhou is a prefecture-level city in Jiangsu Province, administratively divided into six urban districts and four county-level cities. The city's urban core, Gusu District, is historically known as the "Old Town" and preserves Suzhou's iconic canals, classical gardens, and cultural heritage. Established in 2016 through the merger of three former districts (Canglang, Pingjiang, and Jinchang), Gusu remains the political and cultural heart of the city.

To the east of Gusu lies Suzhou Industrial Park (SIP), a nationally designated economic zone established in 1994 through a landmark China-Singapore partnership. To the west, the Suzhou High-Tech District serves as a hub for technology and innovation, founded in 1992.

The city's administrative structure expanded significantly in the 21st century: In 2000, the former Wu County was abolished and split into Xiangcheng District (north) and Wuzhong District (south). In 2012, Wujiang City, a former county-level city, was incorporated as Wujiang District, strengthening Suzhou's governance over Taihu Lake's eastern shores.

Suzhou's economic prosperity is bolstered by its integrated network of county-level cities, which operate with significant autonomy under the prefecture-level administration. These include: Kunshan: A global manufacturing powerhouse and home to China's first county-level economy to exceed RMB 500 billion GDP (2022). Taicang: A major port and hub for over 500 German-invested industries. Changshu: Known for textiles, machinery, and a UNESCO World Heritage Site (Mount Yushan). Zhangjiagang: A leading ecological city and river port on the Yangtze.

Together, Suzhou's districts and county-level cities form one of China's most economically dynamic regions, hosting over 16,000 high-tech enterprises (as of 2023) and contributing to around 20% of Jiangsu Province's GDP.

Map
Subdivision	Simplified Chinese	Hanyu Pinyin	Population (2020)	Area (km^{2})	Density (/km^{2})
City Proper
Gusu District	姑苏区	Gūsū Qū	2,058,010	372	5,532.28
Suburban
Huqiu District	虎丘区	Hǔqiū Qū	832,499	258	3,226.74
Wuzhong District	吴中区	Wúzhōng Qū	1,388,972	672	2,066.92
Xiangcheng District	相城区	Xiāngchéng Qū	891,055	416	2,141.95
Wujiang District	吴江区	Wújiāng Qū	1,545,023	1,093	1,413.56
Satellite cities (County-level cities)
Changshu City	常熟市	Chángshú Shì	1,677,050	1,094	1,532.95
Taicang City	太仓市	Tàicāng Shì	831,113	620	1,340.50
Kunshan City	昆山市	Kūnshān Shì	2,092,496	865	2,419.07
Zhangjiagang City	张家港市	Zhāngjiāgǎng Shì	1,432,044	772	1,854.97
Total			12,748,252	8,488	1,501.84
Not formal administrative subdivisions – Suzhou Industrial Park & Suzhou New District; Defunct districts – Canglang District, Pingjiang District, & Jinchang District

== Geography ==
Suzhou (coordinates: 31°18′6.1″N 120°34′51.9″E) is a prefecture-level city in southeastern Jiangsu Province, China, situated within the Yangtze River Delta—one of the world's most economically dynamic regions. The city lies on the Lake Tai Plain, a fertile alluvial basin bordered by Lake Tai (Taihu) to the southwest, China's third-largest freshwater lake (2,578 km^{2}), and the Yangtze River to the north. Suzhou covers a total area of 8,657.32 square kilometers. The terrain is predominantly low-lying and flat, crossed by numerous rivers and lakes. The majority of Lake Tai (Taihu)'s surface area lies within Suzhou's boundaries. Rivers, lakes, and mudflats collectively account for 36.6% of the city's total land area, solidifying its reputation as a Jiangnan water town (a region south of the Yangtze River renowned for its aquatic landscapes).

=== Topography ===
Suzhou features low-lying and flat terrain, with plains accounting for 53.7% of its total area. The city is part of two first-level natural geographic regions—the Yangtze River Delta Plain and the Taihu Lake Plain—which are further divided into four second-level zones: the Yangtze River Coastal Plain and Sandbar Area, the Suxi (Suzhou-Wuxi) Plain Area, the Taihu Lake and Lakeside Hilly Area, and the Yangcheng—Dianmao Lowland Area.

The landform is characterized by gentle plains. Suzhou's terrain is uniformly low-lying, sloping gradually from west to east. The elevation of its plains ranges between 3–4 meters, while areas around Yangcheng Lake and Wujiang drop to approximately 2 meters.

Low mountains and hills are scattered sporadically, typically reaching heights of 100–350 meters, concentrated in the western mountainous regions and Taihu Lake islands. Notable peaks include: Qionglong Mountain (342 meters, the highest), Nanyang Mountain (338 meters), Misty Peak of West Dongting Mountain (336 meters), Moli Peak of East Dongting Mountain (293 meters), Qizi Mountain (294 meters), Tianping Mountain (201 meters), Lingyan Mountain (182 meters), Yuyang Mountain (171 meters), Yushan Mountain (262 meters), Tan Mountain (252 meters).

=== Hydrology ===
The ancient city of Suzhou is renowned for its intricate network of rivers, canals, and densely clustered lakes. Notable water bodies include Taihu Lake (太湖) and Caohu Lake (漕湖) in the west; Dianshan Lake (淀山湖) and Chenghu Lake (澄湖) in the east; Kuncheng Lake (昆承湖) in the north; and Yangcheng Lake (阳澄湖), Jinji Lake (金鸡湖), and Dushu Lake (独墅湖) in the central region. The Yangtze River and the Grand Canal traverse the city's northern area. Water from Taihu Lake flows northward into the Yangtze River and eastward through the Dianmao wetlands (淀泖地区) into the Huangpu River, while the Grand Canal enters from the west at Wangting (望亭) and exits southward at Shengze (盛泽). Historically, the "Three Rivers" (三江) drained directly to the sea, but today their waters merge into the Huangpu River (黄浦江, forming Suzhou's three major hydrological systems. Crisscrossed by countless waterways, Suzhou is celebrated as the "Water Capital", "Aquatic City", and "Jiangnan Water Town", famously dubbed the "Venice of the East" in the 13th-century The Travels of Marco Polo, who was enchanted by the city.

=== Climate ===
Suzhou has a four-season humid subtropical climate with hot, humid summers and cool, cloudy, damp winters with occasional snowfall (Köppen climate classification Cfa). Northwesterly winds blowing from Siberia during winter can cause temperatures to fall below freezing at night, while southerly or southwesterly winds during the summer can push temperatures above 35 °C (95 °F). The average annual temperature is 17.2 °C (63.0 °F). The hottest temperature recorded since 1951 at Wuzhong District was at 41.0 °C (105.8 °F) on 7 August 2013, and the lowest at −9.8 °C (14.4 °F) on 16 January 1958.

Climate data for Suzhou (Wuzhong District), elevation 8 m (26 ft), (1991–2020 normals)
Month	Jan	Feb	Mar	Apr	May	Jun	Jul	Aug	Sep	Oct	Nov	Dec	Year
Mean daily maximum °C (°F)	8.1 (46.6)	10.4 (50.7)	15.2 (59.4)	21.1 (70.0)	26.1 (79.0)	28.7 (83.7)	33.0 (91.4)	32.6 (90.7)	28.4 (83.1)	23.4 (74.1)	17.4 (63.3)	10.8 (51.4)	21.3 (70.3)
Daily mean °C (°F)	4.5 (40.1)	6.4 (43.5)	10.7 (51.3)	16.3 (61.3)	21.5 (70.7)	24.9 (76.8)	29.1 (84.4)	28.8 (83.8)	24.7 (76.5)	19.5 (67.1)	13.4 (56.1)	7.0 (44.6)	17.2 (63.0)
Mean daily minimum °C (°F)	1.8 (35.2)	3.4 (38.1)	7.2 (45.0)	12.5 (54.5)	17.9 (64.2)	22.0 (71.6)	26.1 (79.0)	26.0 (78.8)	21.9 (71.4)	16.3 (61.3)	10.2 (50.4)	4.0 (39.2)	14.1 (57.4)
Average precipitation mm (inches)	74.8 (2.94)	67.0 (2.64)	87.3 (3.44)	82.8 (3.26)	104.1 (4.10)	211.1 (8.31)	156.1 (6.15)	155.6 (6.13)	104.3 (4.11)	69.1 (2.72)	63.9 (2.52)	48.6 (1.91)	1,224.7 (48.23)
Average precipitation days (≥ 0.1 mm)	10.6	10.2	12.3	11.3	11.0	13.9	12.0	12.8	8.6	7.5	8.8	7.8	126.8
Average snowy days	2.7	1.9	0.4	0	0	0	0	0	0	0	0.2	0.8	6
Average relative humidity (%)	73	73	71	69	70	78	76	77	75	72	73	70	73
Mean monthly sunshine hours	108.8	111.5	139.0	162.0	166.1	120.5	192.4	190.4	154.5	147.3	127.7	127.2	1,747.4
Percentage possible sunshine	34	36	37	42	39	29	45	47	42	42	41	41	40
Source: China Meteorological Administration

Climate data for Suzhou (Wujiang District), elevation 5 m (16 ft), (1991–2020 normals, extremes 1957–present)
Month	Jan	Feb	Mar	Apr	May	Jun	Jul	Aug	Sep	Oct	Nov	Dec	Year
Record high °C (°F)	21.4 (70.5)	27.2 (81.0)	33.3 (91.9)	33.6 (92.5)	37.4 (99.3)	37.5 (99.5)	40.8 (105.4)	40.7 (105.3)	38.2 (100.8)	37.2 (99.0)	30.4 (86.7)	23.9 (75.0)	40.8 (105.4)
Mean daily maximum °C (°F)	8.0 (46.4)	10.4 (50.7)	14.8 (58.6)	20.9 (69.6)	25.9 (78.6)	28.5 (83.3)	32.8 (91.0)	32.4 (90.3)	28.3 (82.9)	23.2 (73.8)	17.3 (63.1)	10.8 (51.4)	21.1 (70.0)
Daily mean °C (°F)	4.3 (39.7)	6.3 (43.3)	10.4 (50.7)	16.0 (60.8)	21.3 (70.3)	24.7 (76.5)	28.9 (84.0)	28.6 (83.5)	24.5 (76.1)	19.1 (66.4)	13.1 (55.6)	6.7 (44.1)	17.0 (62.6)
Mean daily minimum °C (°F)	1.5 (34.7)	3.2 (37.8)	6.9 (44.4)	12.2 (54.0)	17.5 (63.5)	21.8 (71.2)	25.9 (78.6)	25.8 (78.4)	21.5 (70.7)	15.7 (60.3)	9.6 (49.3)	3.5 (38.3)	13.8 (56.8)
Record low °C (°F)	−9.8 (14.4)	−9.6 (14.7)	−5.1 (22.8)	−1.2 (29.8)	6.6 (43.9)	12.0 (53.6)	16.2 (61.2)	18.6 (65.5)	10.8 (51.4)	2.3 (36.1)	−4.2 (24.4)	−9.0 (15.8)	−9.8 (14.4)
Average precipitation mm (inches)	74.5 (2.93)	67.1 (2.64)	97.3 (3.83)	82.2 (3.24)	103.6 (4.08)	212.3 (8.36)	155.9 (6.14)	141.3 (5.56)	96.7 (3.81)	67.9 (2.67)	55.4 (2.18)	46.0 (1.81)	1,200.2 (47.25)
Average precipitation days (≥ 0.1 mm)	10.8	10.3	13.0	11.3	11.6	14.1	11.6	12.0	8.6	7.2	8.9	8.1	127.5
Average snowy days	3.0	1.7	0.6	0	0	0	0	0	0	0	0.2	0.8	6.3
Average relative humidity (%)	76	75	74	72	73	80	78	79	78	75	76	74	76
Mean monthly sunshine hours	116.5	119.7	140.9	167.1	177.2	132.8	209.9	210.4	170.5	165.7	135.5	132.3	1,878.5
Percentage possible sunshine	36	38	38	43	42	31	49	52	46	47	43	42	42
Source: China Meteorological Administration all-time September Record High

== Cityscape and environment ==
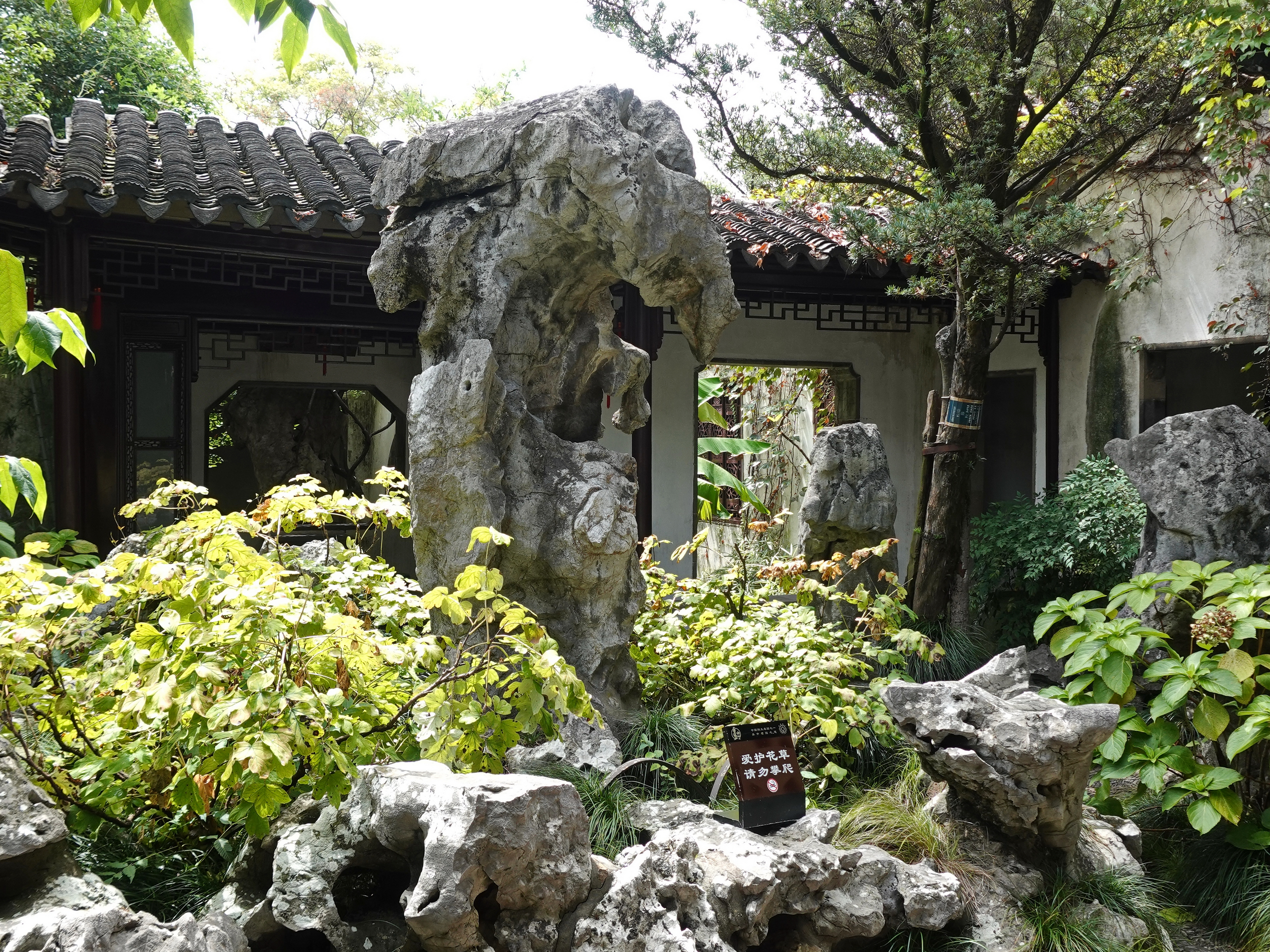
Lingering Garden

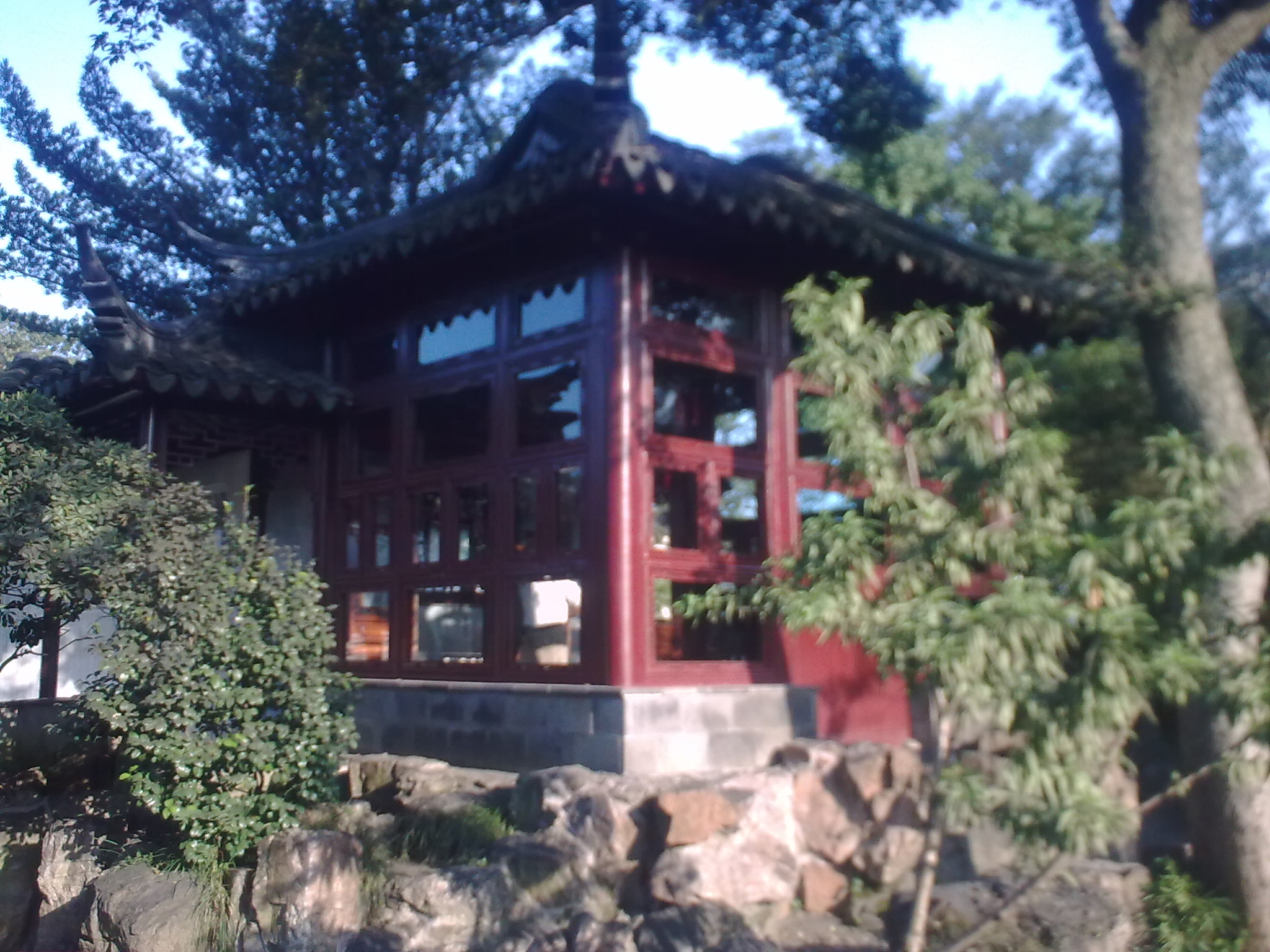
Couple's Retreat Garden

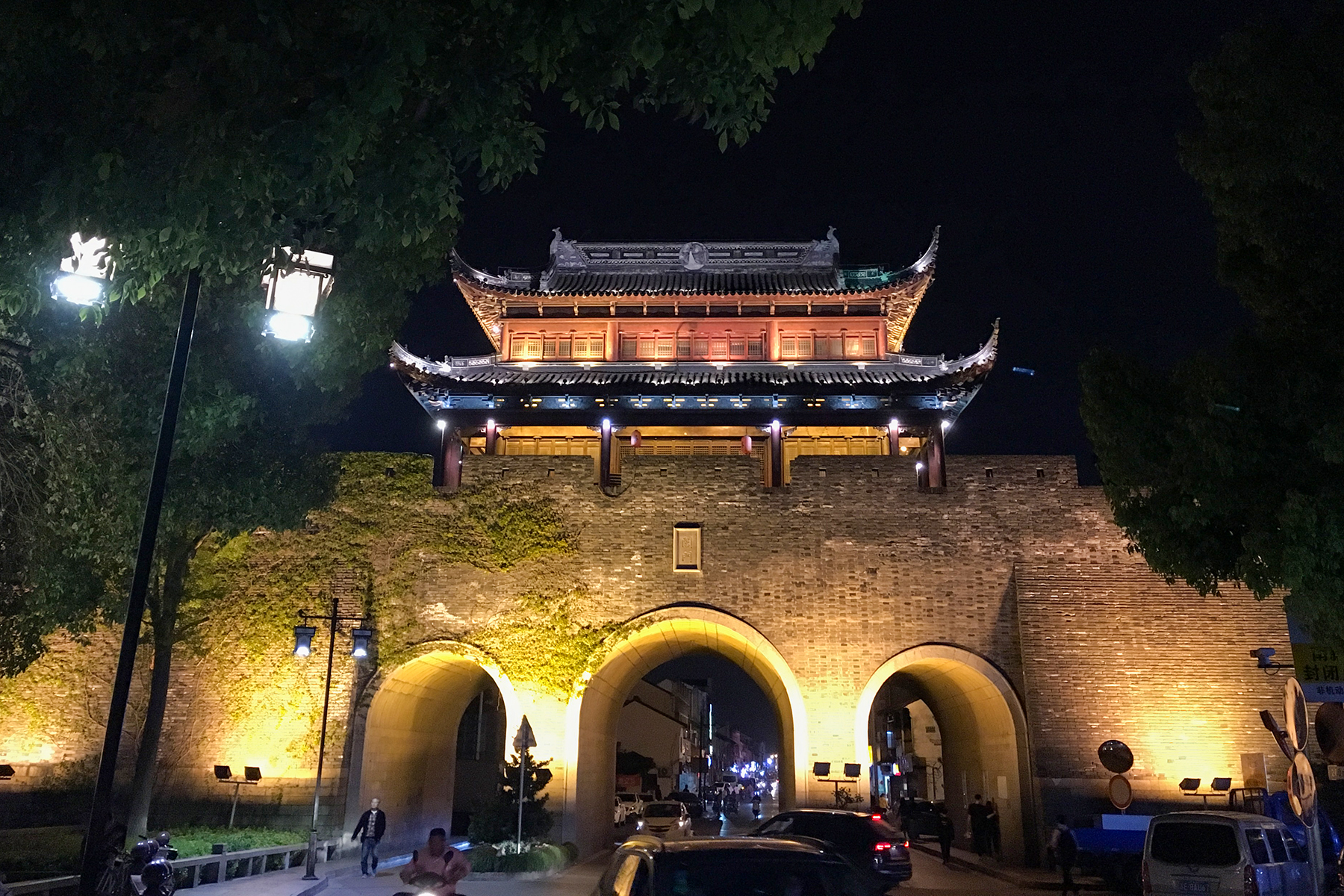
Changmen at night

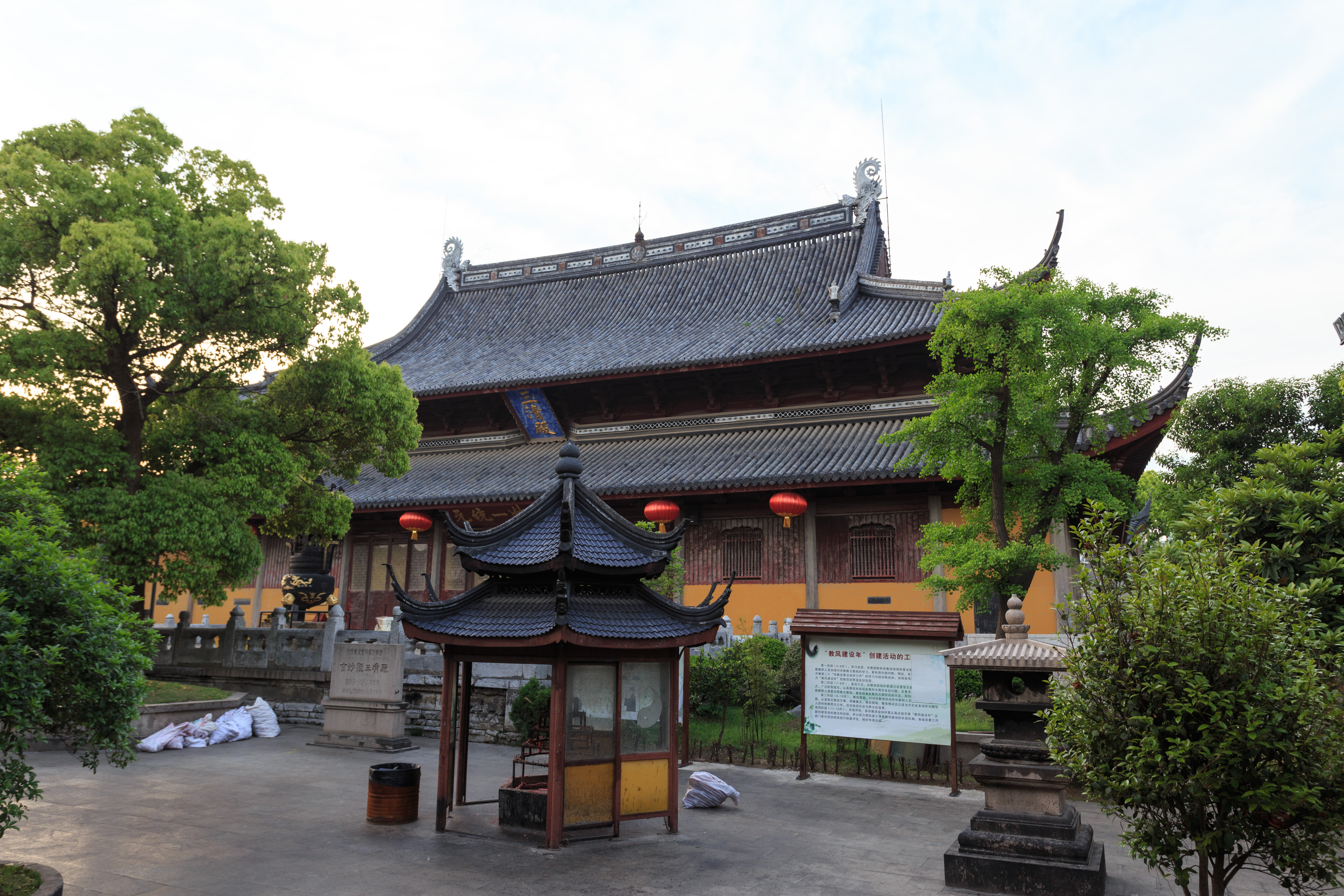
Xuanmiao Temple

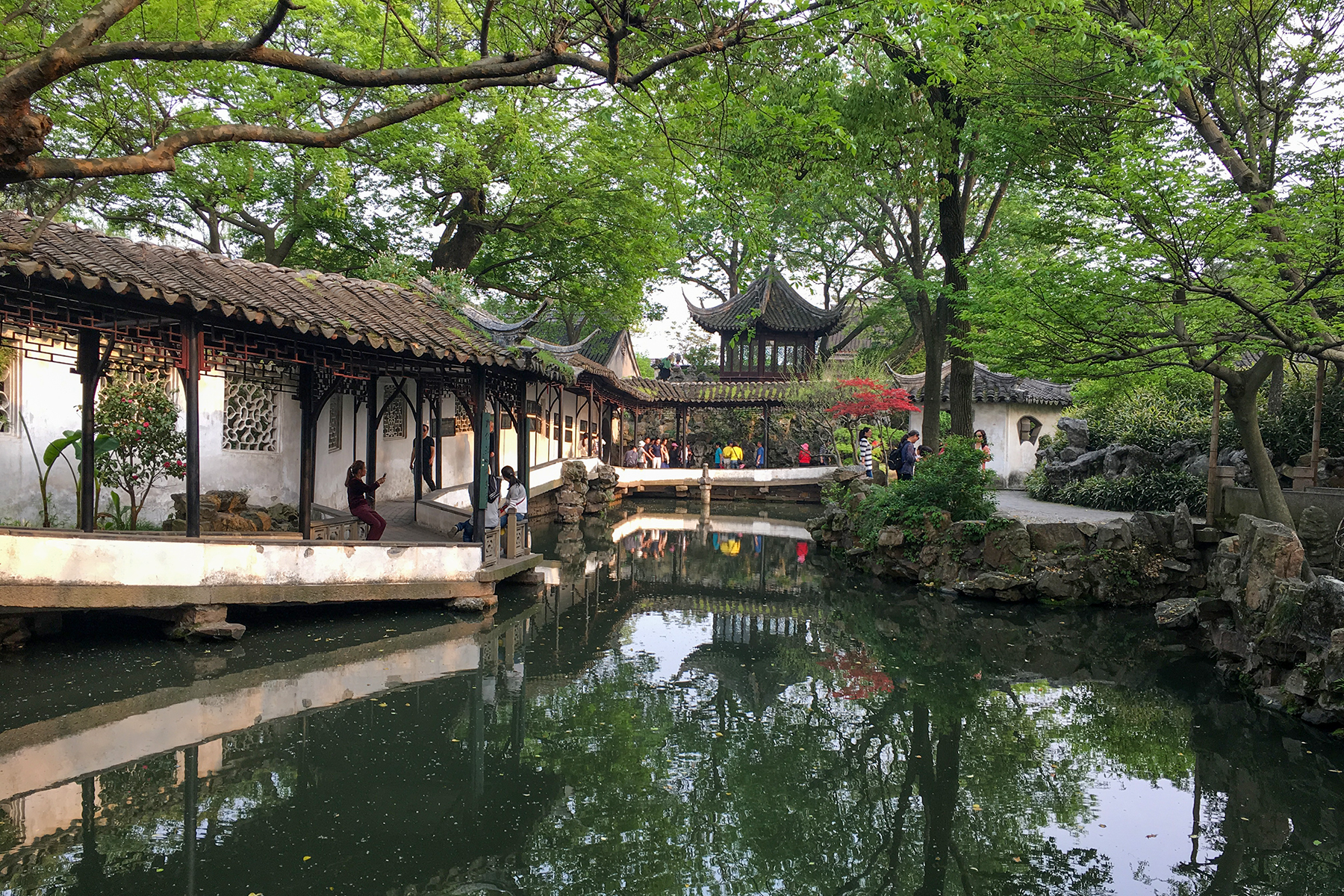
The Humble Administrator's Garden

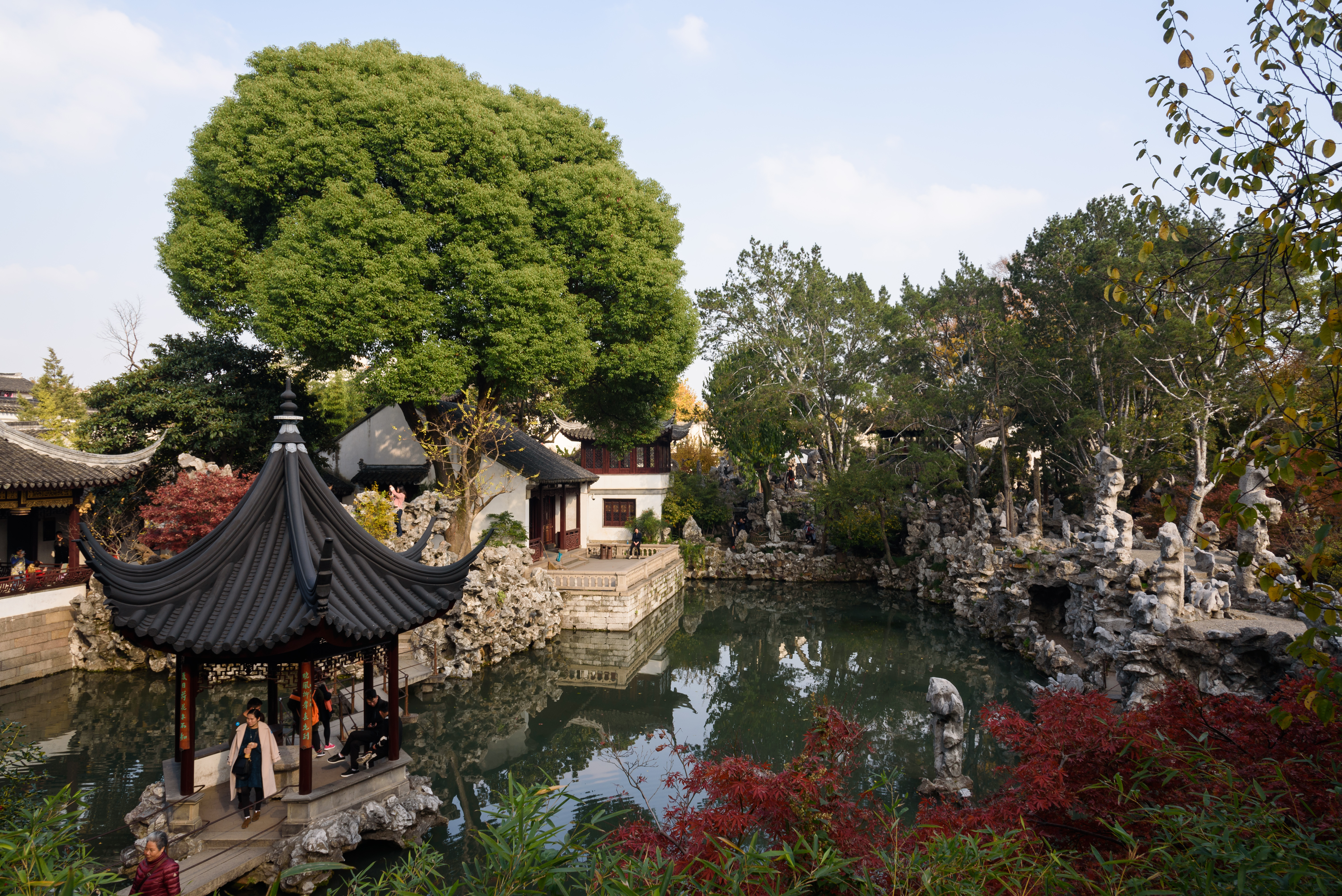
Lion Grove Garden

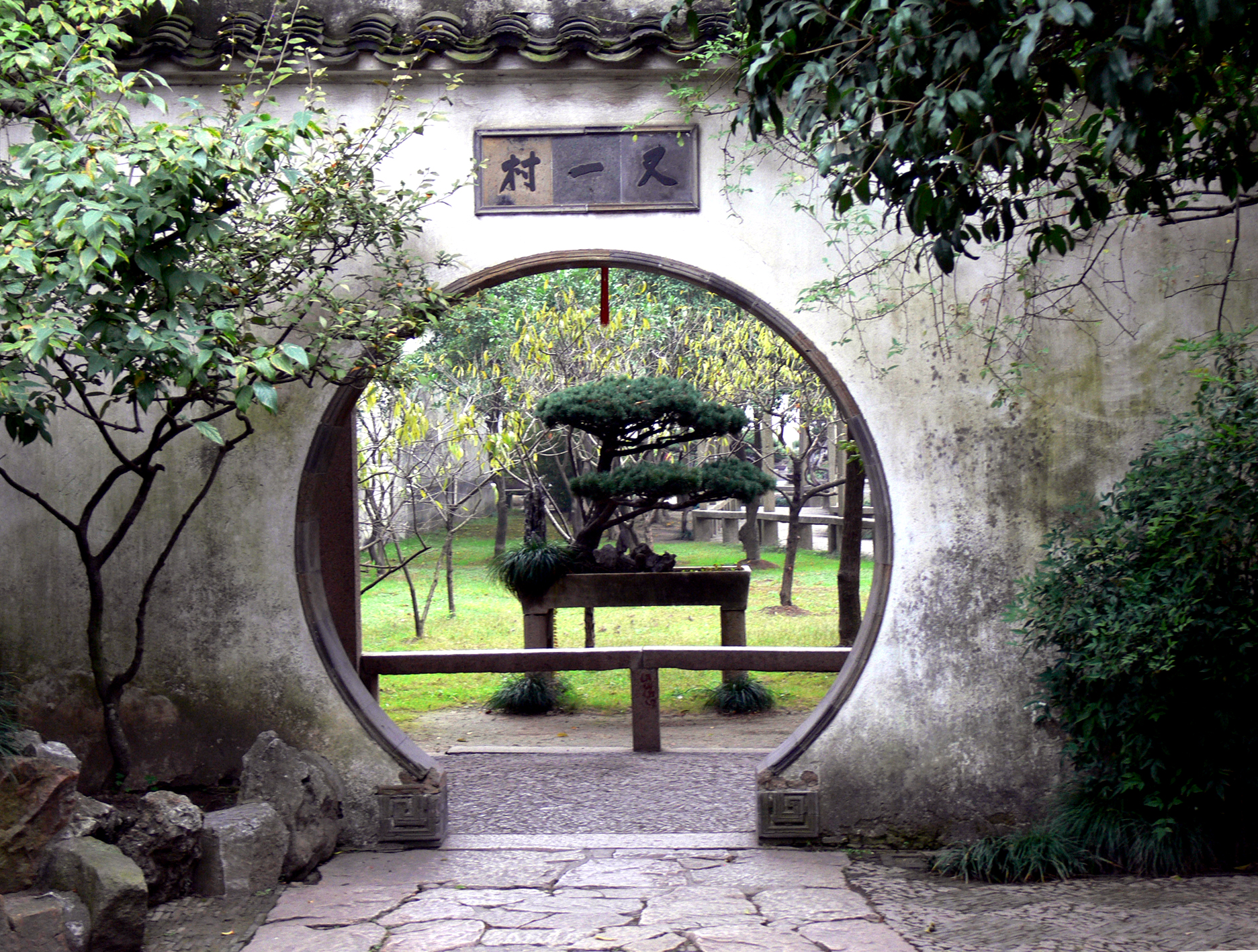
An entrance to the Youyicun Garden

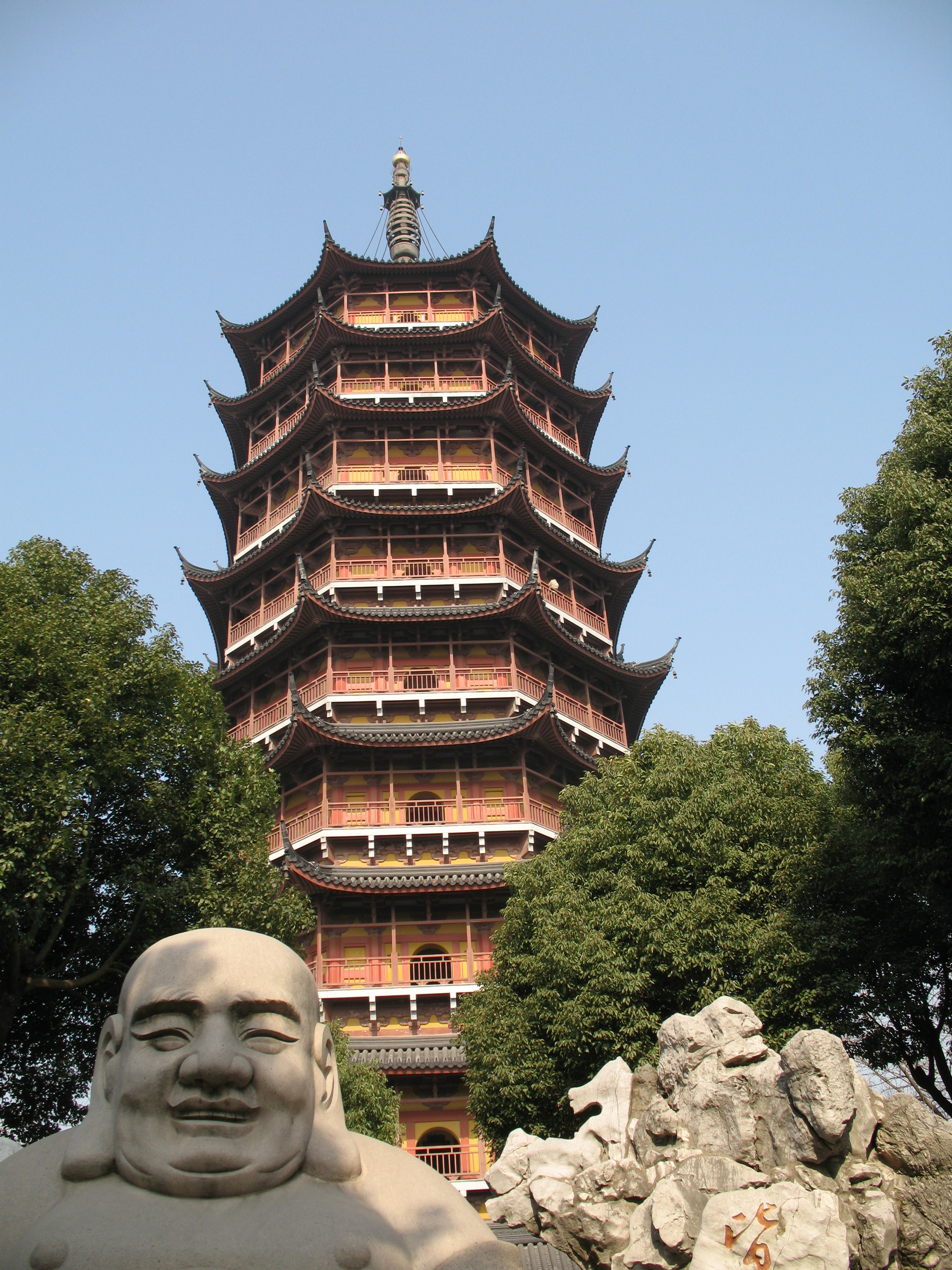
Beisi Pagoda

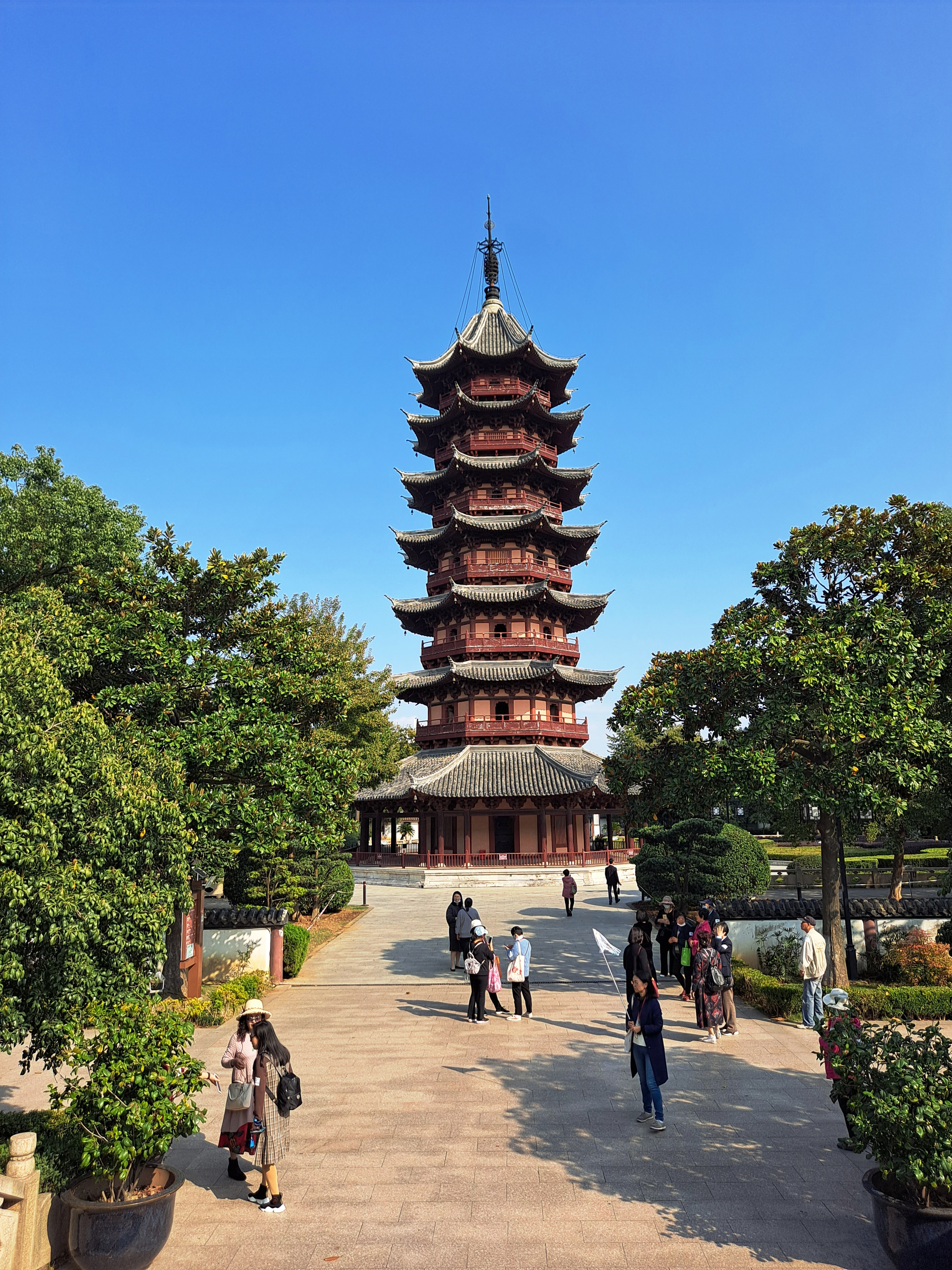
Ruiguang Pagoda

=== Classical Gardens of Suzhou ===
Suzhou is famous for its over 60 Classical Gardens, collectively a UNESCO World Heritage Site. The city has the most UNESCO-recognized gardens in the world.

The Humble Administrator's Garden and Lingering Garden are among the four most famous classical gardens in China. The Canglang Pavilion, Lion Grove Garden, Humble Administrator's Garden and Lingering Garden, respectively representing the garden styles of traditional architecture are called the four most famous gardens in Suzhou. Other gardens inscribed on the World Heritage List include the Couple's Retreat Garden, the Garden of Cultivation, and the Retreat and Reflection Garden. Five Peaks Garden which dates to the Ming dynasty (1522–1566) is also located in the Suzhou. Ming painter Wen Boren established his home on the site. The original name was Qiayin Shanfang and the garden is located at Changmin West Street.

=== Temples ===
- Hanshan Temple
- Xiyuan Temple
- Xuanmiao Temple
- Lingyanshan Temple
- Chongyuan Temple

=== Canals and Historic Districts ===
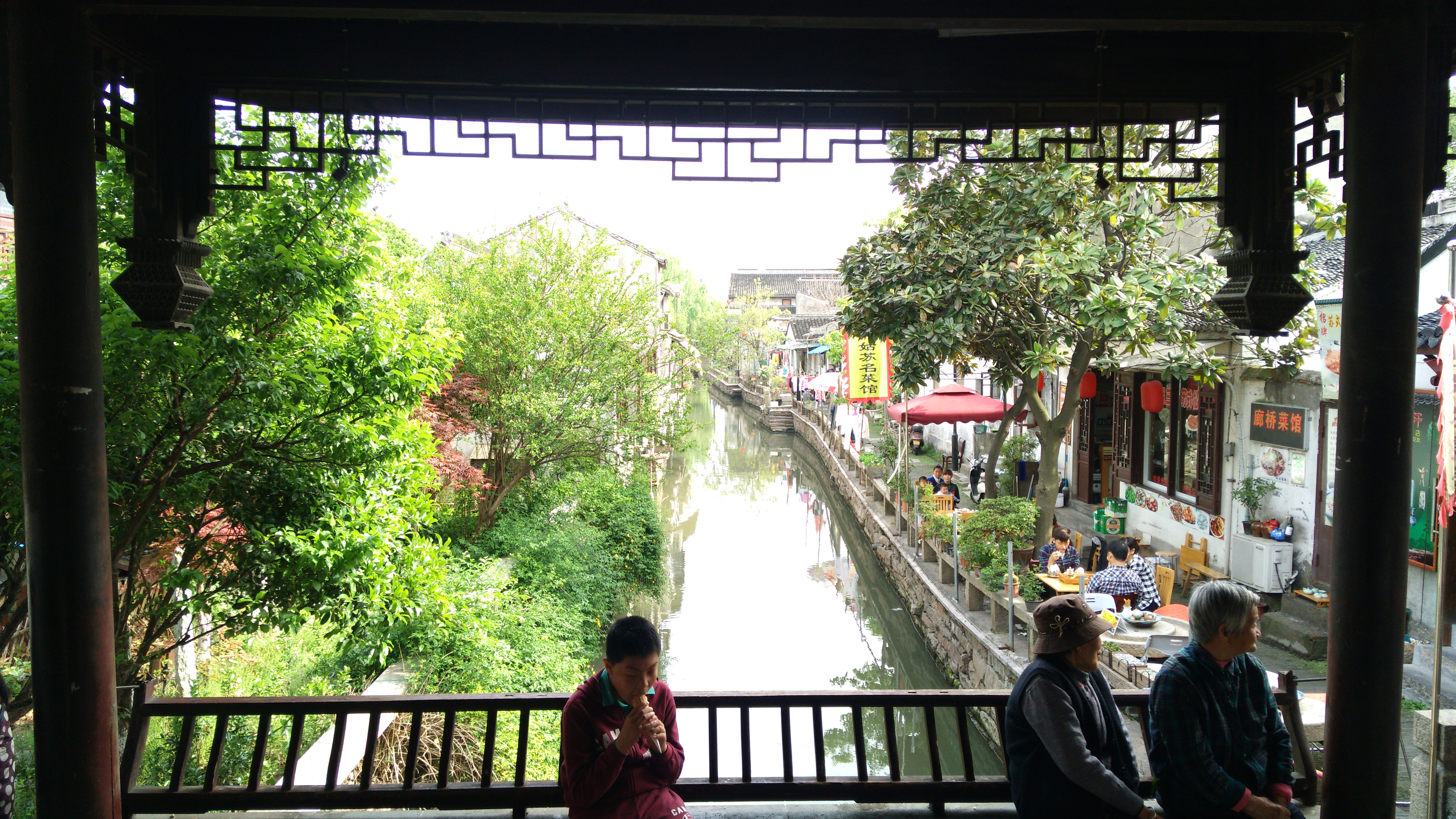
Pingjiang Road

The Suzhou section of the Jiangnan Canal, Grand Canal (China), includes ten city gates and over 20 stone bridges of traditional design and historic areas that have been well preserved, as well as temples and pavilions. Xinshi Bridge is a bridge that has been built over this canal. There are a full 24 waterways in Suzhou near the Grand Canal.

In 2015, both 800-year-old Pingjiang Road Historical Block (平江路) and 1,200-year-old Shantang Street Scenic Area (山塘街) were added to the list of China's "National Historic and Cultural Streets".

Pingjiang Road runs parallel to the Pingjiang River for 1.5 kilometers and is lined with homes and some teahouses. Shantang Street, over twice as long at 3.8 km, is described by the BBC as retaining "the alluring qualities of an old canal-side street: whitewashed buildings are completed by red-tasseled lanterns that swing softly in the breeze, adding to the charm of the river bank".

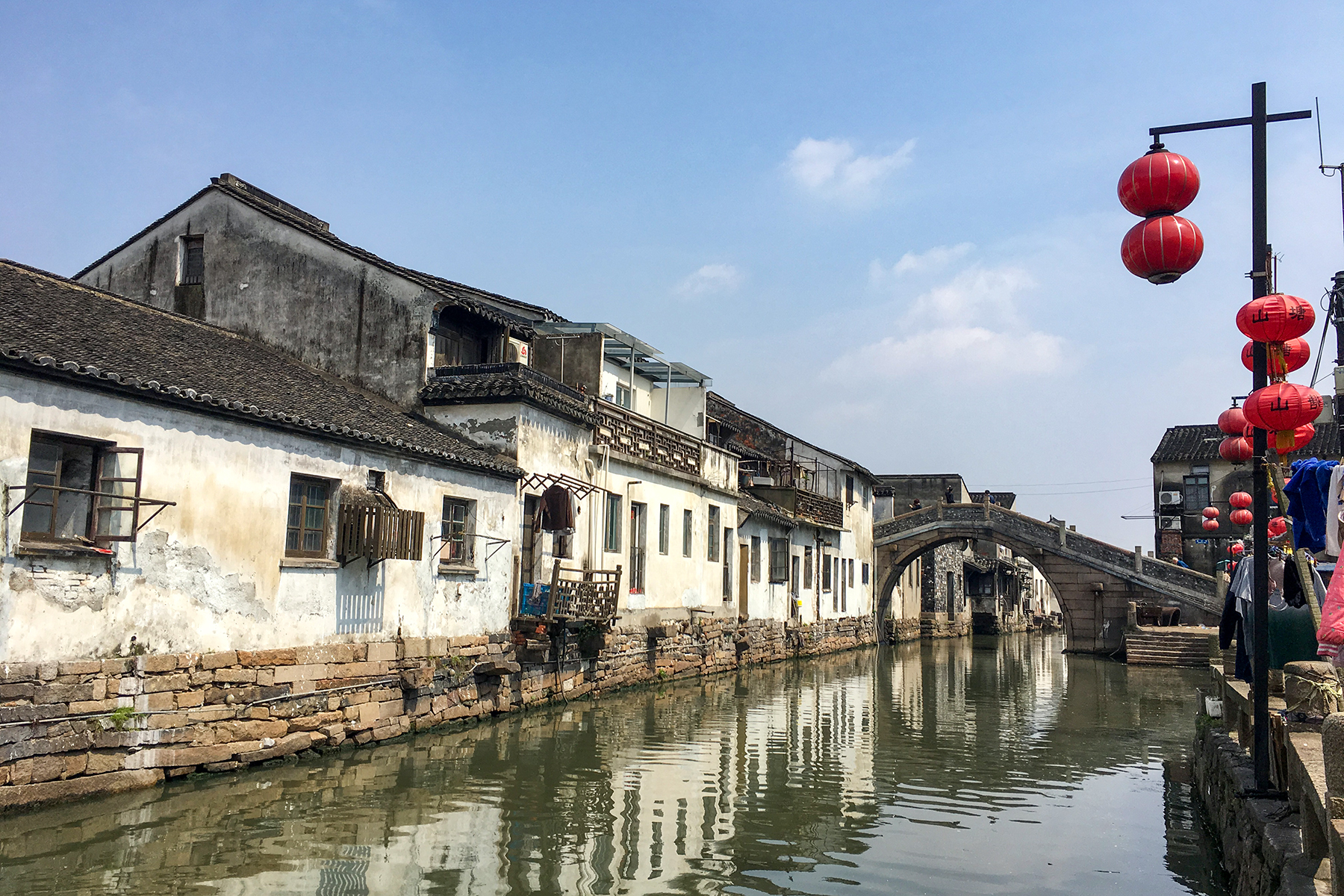
Shantang Street

Boat tours are offered on the waterways of this city that was dubbed the "Venice of the East" by Marco Polo because of its criss-crossing canals and stone bridges. The Grand Canal (from Beijing to Zhejiang province) is a UNESCO World Heritage Site.

=== Resorts and natural reserves ===
Suzhou Taihu National Tourism and Vacation Zone (苏州太湖国家旅游度假区) is in the western part of Suzhou, 15 km (9 mi) from the city center.

=== Skyscrapers ===
The construction of buildings exceeding 24 metres (79 ft) in height is prohibited within Gusu District in order to preserve Suzhou's historic skyline. As a result, most of the city's skyscrapers are concentrated in the Suzhou Industrial Park (SIP) and the Suzhou New District (SND).

Suzhou IFS is a 450-metre (1,480 ft), 95-storey skyscraper located on the eastern shore of Jinji Lake in Suzhou Industrial Park. It is currently the tallest building in both Suzhou and Jiangsu Province.

Gate to the East, nicknamed the "Giant Trousers" for its distinctive design, is a 301.8-metre (990 ft), 74-storey skyscraper located on the western shore of Jinji Lake. It is one of Suzhou's most recognizable landmarks.

=== Pan Gate ===
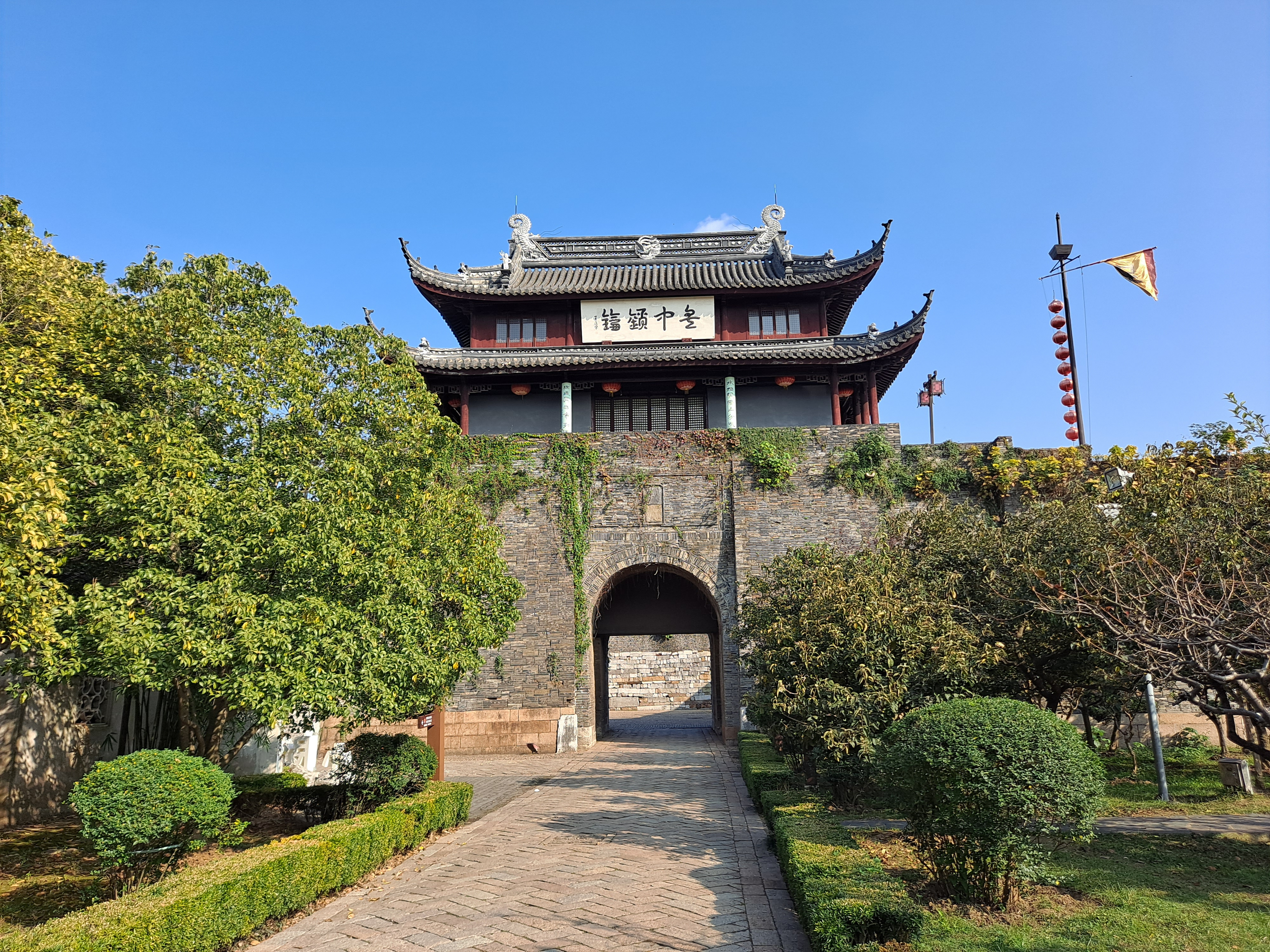
Pan Gate

Pan Gate is on the southwest corner of the Main Canal or encircling canal of Suzhou. Originally built during the Warring States period in the state of Wu, historians estimate it to be around 2,500 years old. It is now part of the Pan Gate Scenic Area. It is known for the "three landmarks of Pan Gate". They are the Ruiguang Pagoda, the earliest pagoda in Suzhou built in 247 BC, the Wu Gate Bridge, the entrance to the gate at that time over the water passage and the highest bridge in Suzhou at the time, and the Pan Gate. The Ruigang Pagoda is constructed of brick with wooden platforms and has Buddhist carvings at its base.

=== Baodai Bridge ===
Baodai Bridge stretches across the Tantai Lake in the suburbs of Suzhou. To raise money to finance the bridge, the magistrate donated his expensive belt, hence the name. The bridge was first built in 806 A.D. in the Tang dynasty and has 53 arches with a length of 317 meters. It was made out of stone from Jinshan Mountain and is the longest standing bridge of its kind in China. The bridge was included on the list of national monuments (resolution 5–285) in 2001.

=== Tiger Hill ===
Tiger Hill is known for its natural environment and historical sites. The hill is so named because it is said to look like a crouching tiger. Another legend states that a white tiger appeared on the hill to guard it following the burial The hill has been a tourist destination for hundreds, if not thousands, of years, as is evident from the poetry and calligraphy carved into rocks on the hill. The Song dynasty poet, Su Shi said, "It is a lifelong pity if having visited Suzhou you did not visit Tiger Hill."

=== Pagodas ===
Yunyan Pagoda (or Huqiu Tower), built in 961, is a Chinese pagoda built on Tiger Hill in Suzhou. It has several other names, including the "Leaning Tower of China" (as referred to by historian O.G. Ingles) and the Yunyan Temple Tower. The tower rises to a height of 47 m (154 ft). It is a seven-story octagonal building built with blue bricks. Over more than a thousand years, the tower has gradually slanted due to forces of nature. Now the top and bottom of the tower vary by 2.32 meters. The entire structure weighs some 7,000,000 kilograms (15,000,000 lb), supported by internal brick columns. However, the tower leans roughly 3 degrees due to the cracking of two supporting columns.

Beisi Pagoda or North Temple Pagoda is a Chinese pagoda at Bao'en Temple in Suzhou. It rises nine stories to a height of 76 m (249 ft). It is the tallest Chinese pagoda south of the Yangtze River.

Twin Pagodas (simplified Chinese: 苏州双塔; traditional Chinese: 蘇州雙塔) lie in the Dinghui Temple Lane in the southeastern corner of the city proper of Suzhou. They are artistic and natural as they are close at hand. One of them is called "Clarity-Dispensing Pagoda," and the other, the "Beneficence Pagoda"; they are in the same form of architecture. There are many legends about these one-thousand-year-old pagodas. It is charming that the exquisite and straight Twin Pagoda look like two inserted writing brushes. There was originally a single-story house with three rooms, just like a writing brush holder with the shadows of the two pagodas reclining on its roof at sunset. To the east of the pagoda is a square five-story bell building built in the Ming dynasty, which appears exactly like a thick ink stick. So there is a saying that "the Twin Pagodas are as writing brushes while the bell building as ink stick".

=== Museums ===
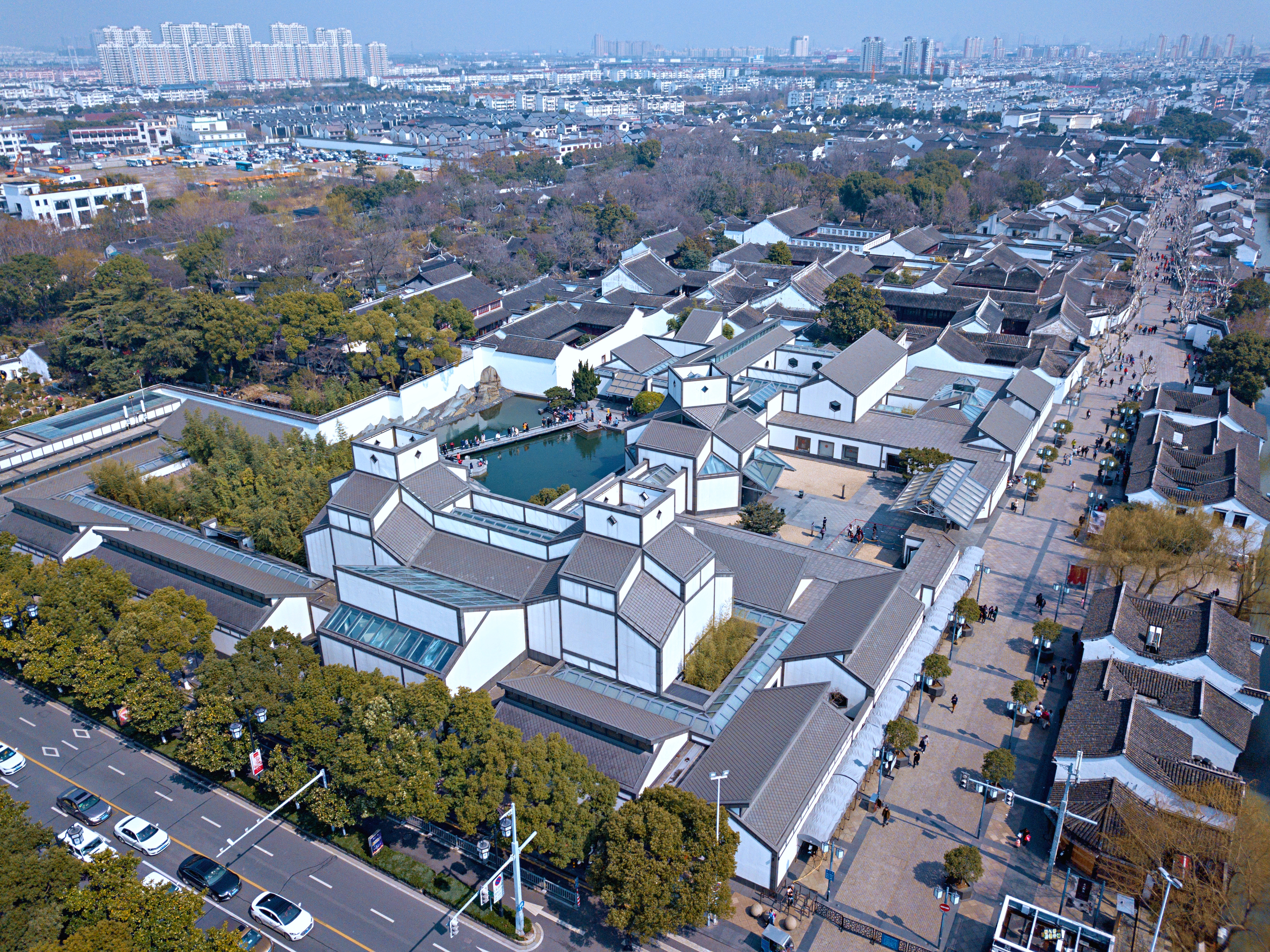
Suzhou Museum, designed by I. M. Pei, is one of the landmarks of Suzhou, combining traditional culture and modern design.

The city's major museums include the Suzhou Museum (designed by I. M. Pei), Suzhou Silk Museum, China Kunqu Museum and the Suzhou Museum of Contemporary Art. The Jinji Lake Art Museum, displaying contemporary art, is located in the Suzhou Culture and Arts Centre on the shore of Jinji Lake.

=== Hospita ===
As a result of its recent rapid population increase, healthcare demand in Suzhou is increasing rapidly. In July 2019, Washington University School of Medicine announced a collaboration with Huici Health Management Co., and the Xiangcheng District, to open the new Huici Medical Center, which will include a 1,000-bed hospital for adult and pediatric patients. Once the hospital is unveiled, Washington University doctors in St. Louis will be able to provide long-distance health-care services to patients in China through a telemedicine program.

== Demographics ==
The population of Suzhou is predominantly Han Chinese. The official language of broadcast, instruction, etc. is Mandarin Chinese, although many speak a local dialect known as Suzhounese, a member of the Wu language family. In addition to American and European expatriates, there is a large Korean community in Suzhou. The Industrial Bank of Korea (IBK) estimated that there were 15,000 Koreans in the municipality in 2014. That year, 850 Korean companies operated in Suzhou, and the Koreans made up the largest number of students at the Suzhou Singapore International School.

Population of Suzhou at the end of 2015
Region	Total population 总户籍人口 (persons)	Resident population 常住人口 (10,000 persons)
Whole municipality	6 670 124	1061.60
Urban area	3 412 564	549.21
Gusu District	734 362	95.20
Wuzhong District	631 602	112.12
Xiangcheng District	405 400	72.87
New & Hi-tech Zone, Huqiu District	363 713	59.08
Industrial Park	459 535	80.26
Wujiang District	817 952	126.68
County-level cities	3 257 560	–
Changshu	1 068 211	151.01
Zhangjiagang	922 757	125.31
Kunshan	787 031	165.12
Taicang	479 561	70.95

== Economy ==
Suzhou's economy is based primarily on its large manufacturing sector—China's first and largest (from 2020)—including iron and steel, IT and electronic equipment, and textile products. The city's service sector is notably well-developed, primarily owing to tourism, which brought in a total of RMB 152 billion of revenue in 2013. Suzhou's overall GDP exceeded RMB 1.3 trillion in 2013 (up 9.6 percent from the year previous).

The city is also one of China's foremost destinations for foreign investment, based on its relative proximity to Shanghai and comparatively low operating costs. The municipal government has enacted various measures to encourage FDI in a number of manufacturing (e.g., pharmaceutical, electronic goods, automobile) and service (e.g., banking, logistics, research services) sectors. Included among these measures is a preferential tax policy for limited partnership venture capital enterprises in the Suzhou Industrial Park.

Suzhou is a highly developed economic region in China and is the economic centre, industrial, commercial and logistical hub city of Jiangsu province, as well as an important financial, cultural, artistic, educational and transportation centre.

=== Agriculture ===
In 2013, total grain production reached 1,311,200 tonnes, a decrease of 2.9%. Grain supply was effectively guaranteed through the vigorous construction of commodity grain production bases, wholesale grain markets and reserve systems.

=== Traditional handicrafts ===
Suzhou has a long history of reeling silkworms and has always been an important base for silk production in China. Since the Song and Yuan dynasties, Suzhou has been one of the centres of silk weaving and dyeing in the country, and in the Ming dynasty, Suzhou silk was praised as the "clothing of the world".

=== Development zones ===
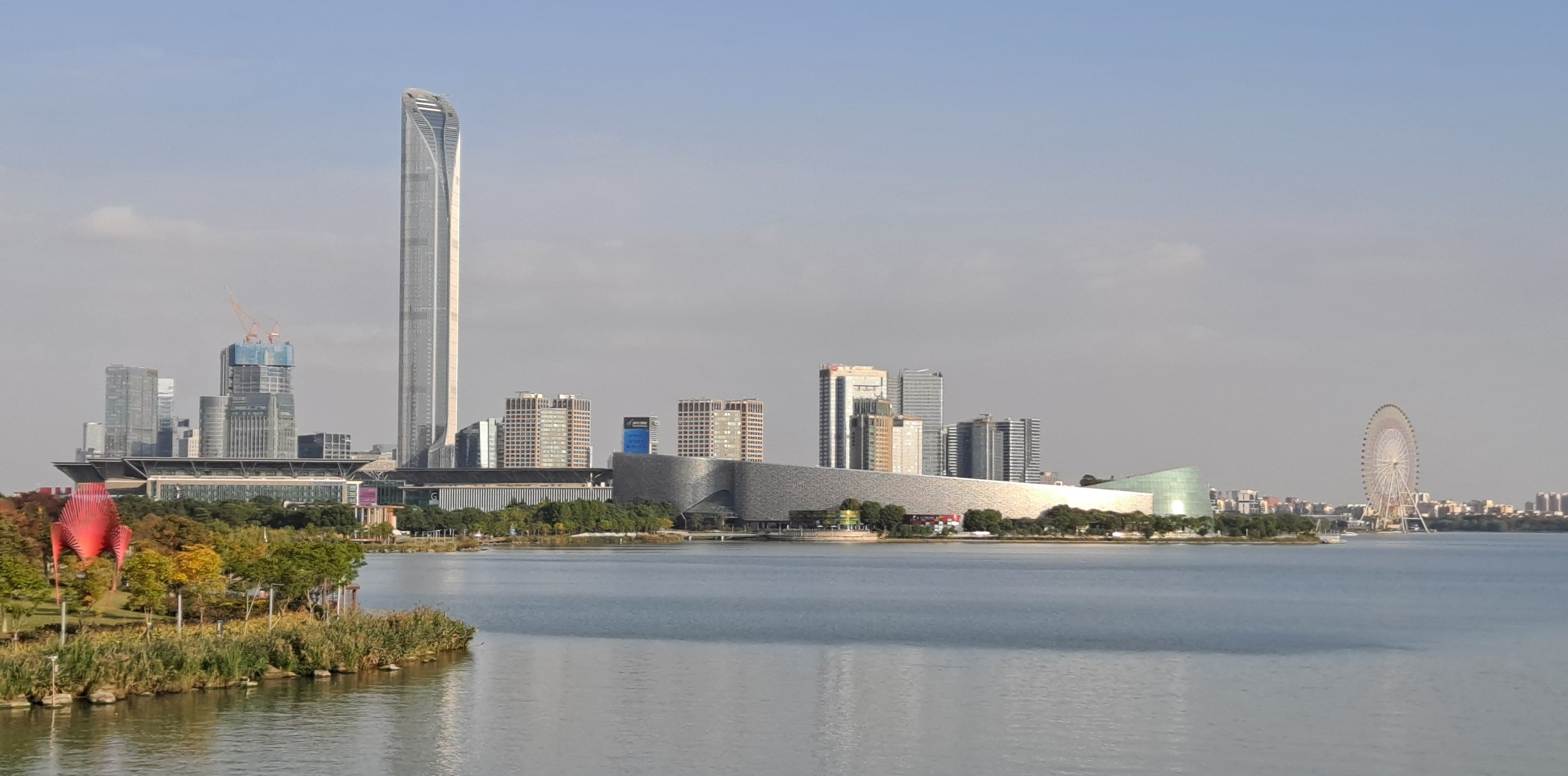
Suzhou Industrial Park

==== Suzhou Industrial Park ====
The Suzhou Industrial Park (SIP) is the largest cooperative project between the Chinese and Singaporean governments. It is beside Jinji Lake, which lies to the east of the Suzhou Old City. On 26 February 1994, Vice Premier Li Lanqing and Senior Minister Lee Kuan Yew, representing China and Singapore respectively, signed an agreement to jointly develop Suzhou Industrial Park (originally called the Singapore Industrial Park). The project officially commenced on 12 May in the same year. SIP has a jurisdiction area of 288 km^{2} (111 sq mi), of which, the China-Singapore cooperation area covers 80 km^{2} (31 sq mi) with a planned residential population of 1.2 million.

SIP is home to the Suzhou Dushu Lake Science and Education Innovation District, an area of universities and higher education institutions, including Soochow University and Xi'an Jiaotong-Liverpool University. Suzhou Industrial Park is also a popular residential district for many foreigners who work and live in Suzhou, as well as 'new Suzhou' residents who migrate to the area in search of work opportunities.

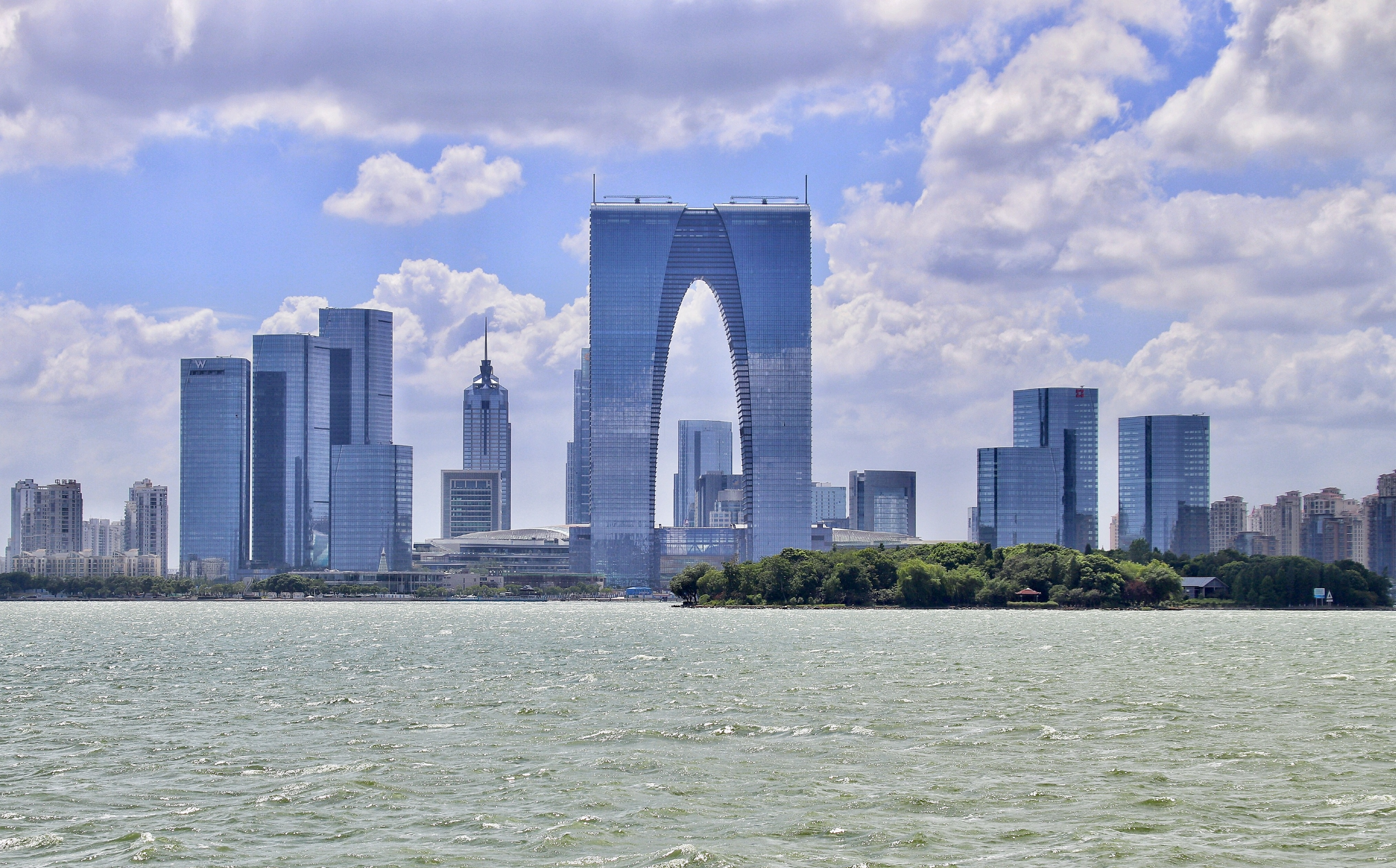
View of the Gate to the East and Suzhou's Jinji Lake

==== Suzhou Industrial Park Export Processing Zone ====
The Suzhou Industrial Park Export Processing Zone was approved to be established by the government in April 2000, with a planning area of 2.9 km^{2} (1.1 sq mi). It is in the Suzhou Industrial Park, set up by China and Singapore. Inside the Export Processing Zone, all the infrastructure is of high standard.

==== Suzhou New District ====
The Suzhou New District was established in 1990. In November 1992, the zone was approved to be a national-level hi-tech industrial zone. By the end of 2007, foreign-invested companies had a registered capital worth of US$13 billion, of which US$6.8 billion was paid in. SND hosts now more than 1,500 foreign companies. Some 40 Fortune 500 companies set up 67 projects in the district.

== Sports ==
The Suzhou Dongwu currently play in China League One, the second highest level of Chinese professional football competition. The 13,000-seat Suzhou Industrial Park Sports Arena was one of the venues for the 2019 FIBA Basketball World Cup.

== Transportation ==
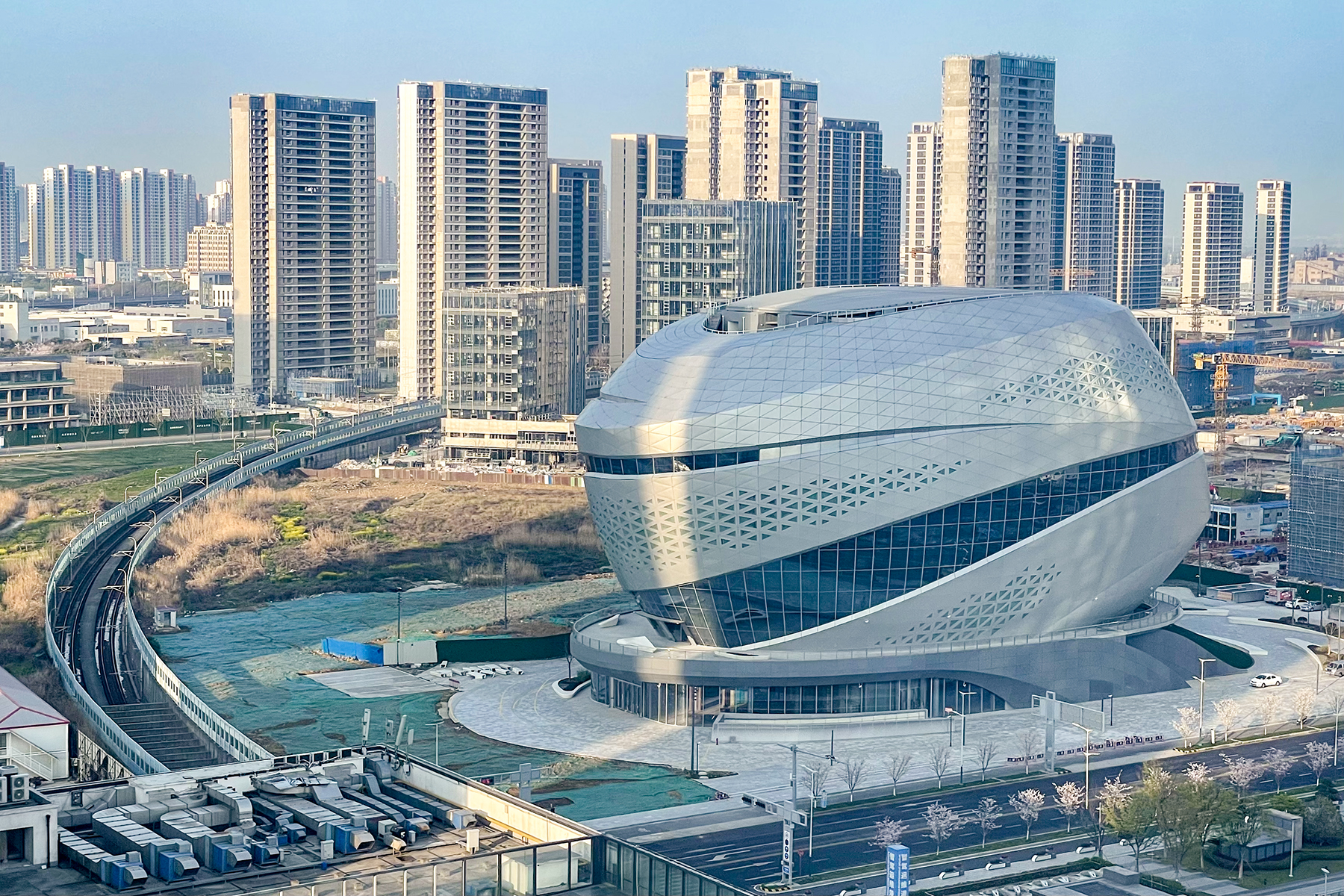
Suzhou HSR New Town

=== Railway ===
Suzhou is on the Shanghai-Nanjing corridor, which carries three parallel railways. Suzhou railway station, near the city center, is among the busiest passenger stations in China. It is served by the Beijing–Shanghai railway (mostly "conventional" trains to stations throughout China) and the Shanghai-Nanjing intercity railway (high-speed D- and G-series trains providing frequent service primarily between Shanghai and Nanjing). It takes only 25 minutes to reach Shanghai railway station on the fastest G-series trains and less than 1 hour to Nanjing.

The Suzhou North railway station, a few kilometers to the north, is on the Beijing–Shanghai high-speed railway (opened 2011), served by high-speed trains to Beijing, Qingdao, etc.

Other stations on the Beijing–Shanghai railway and the Shanghai–Nanjing intercity railway serve other points in the same corridor within Suzhou Prefecture-level city, such as Kunshan. In between Suzhou and Kunshan South railway station, Suzhou Industrial Park railway station is also an important station for people visiting and living in the areas.

The northern part of the prefectural area, including Zhangjiagang, Changshu and Taicang, was the last area to be connected by rail; the Shanghai–Suzhou–Nantong railway reached there in 2020.

=== Highways ===
The Nanjing-Shanghai Expressway connects Suzhou with Shanghai; alternatively, there is the Yangtze Riverine Expressway and the Suzhou-Jiaxing-Hangzhou Expressway. In 2005, the Suzhou Outer Ring was completed, linking the peripheral county-level cities of Taicang, Kunshan, and Changshu. China National Highway 312 also passes through Suzhou.

=== Water transport ===
Port of Suzhou, on the right bank of the Yangtze River, dealt with 428 million tons of cargo and 5.86 million TEU containers in 2012, which made it the busiest inland river port in the world by annual cargo tonnage and container volume.

=== Air ===
Wuxi Shuofang Airport, located 20 kilometers from Suzhou city center in the neighboring city of Wuxi, is the closest airport to Suzhou with commercial service. In 2023, a city terminal was opened to provide convenient connections to Shanghai Hongqiao International Airport and Shanghai Pudong International Airport, and was assigned its own IATA code, SZO.

=== Metro ===
The Suzhou Metro currently has nine lines in operation and one line in construction. The masterplan consists of nine independent lines. Line 1 started operation on 28 April 2012, Line 2 started operation on 28 December 2013, and Line 4 started operation in 2017. Line 5 began operation in June 2021, followed by Line 11 in June 2023, which connects to Line 11 of the Shanghai Metro. The 3 most recent lines all opened in 2024: Line 6 in June, Line 8 in September, and finally Line 7 in December.

=== Tram ===
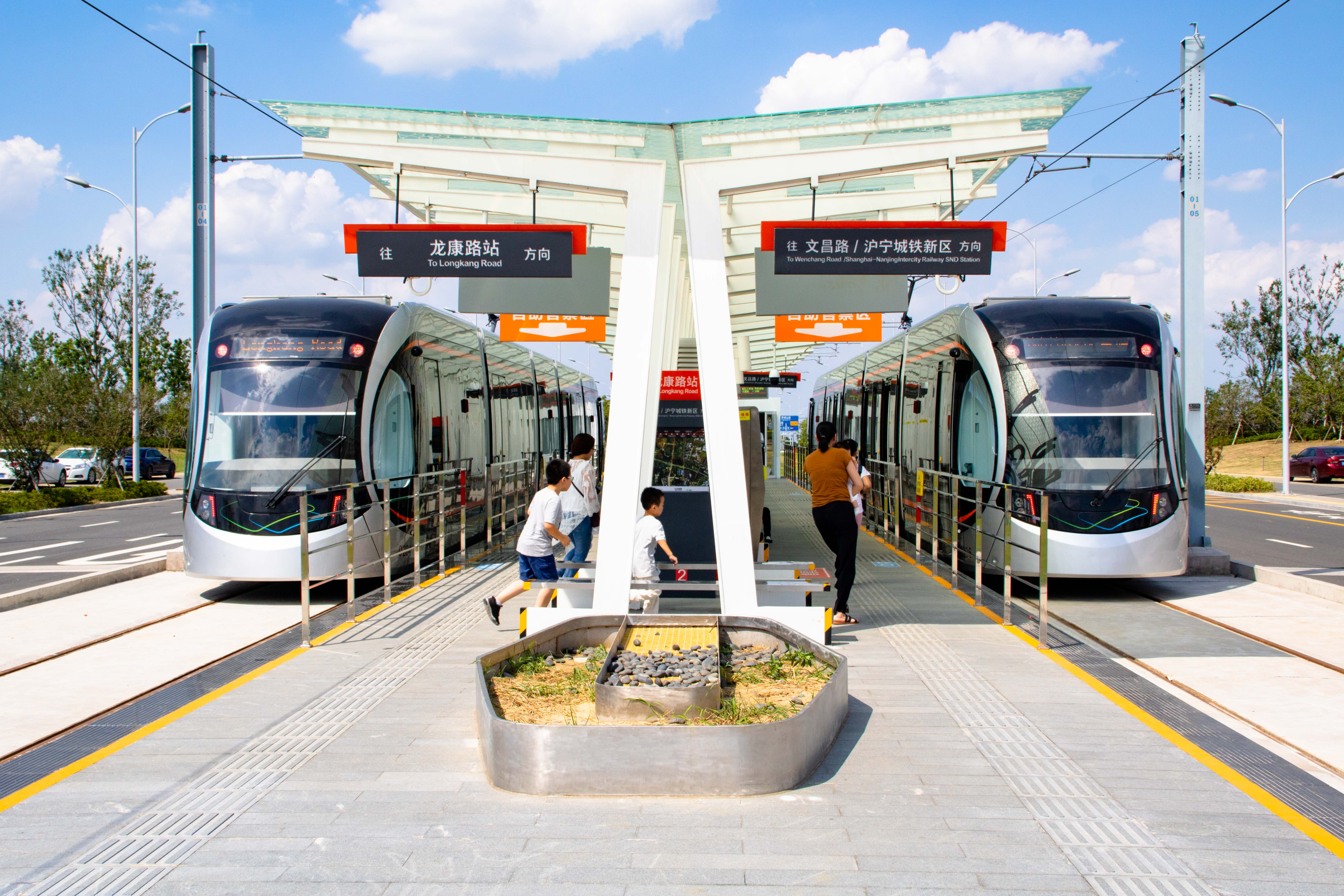
Suzhou Tram's Longkang Road Station

The Suzhou Tram system has two routes in the Suzhou New District.

=== Bus ===
Suzhou has public bus routes that run into all parts of the city. Fares are flat rated, usually 1 Yuan for a non-air-conditioned bus and 2 Yuan for an air-conditioned one. The Suzhou BRT, a 25-kilometer (16 mi)-long bus rapid transit system opened in 2008, operates 5 lines using elevated busways and bus-only lanes throughout the city.

== Culture ==
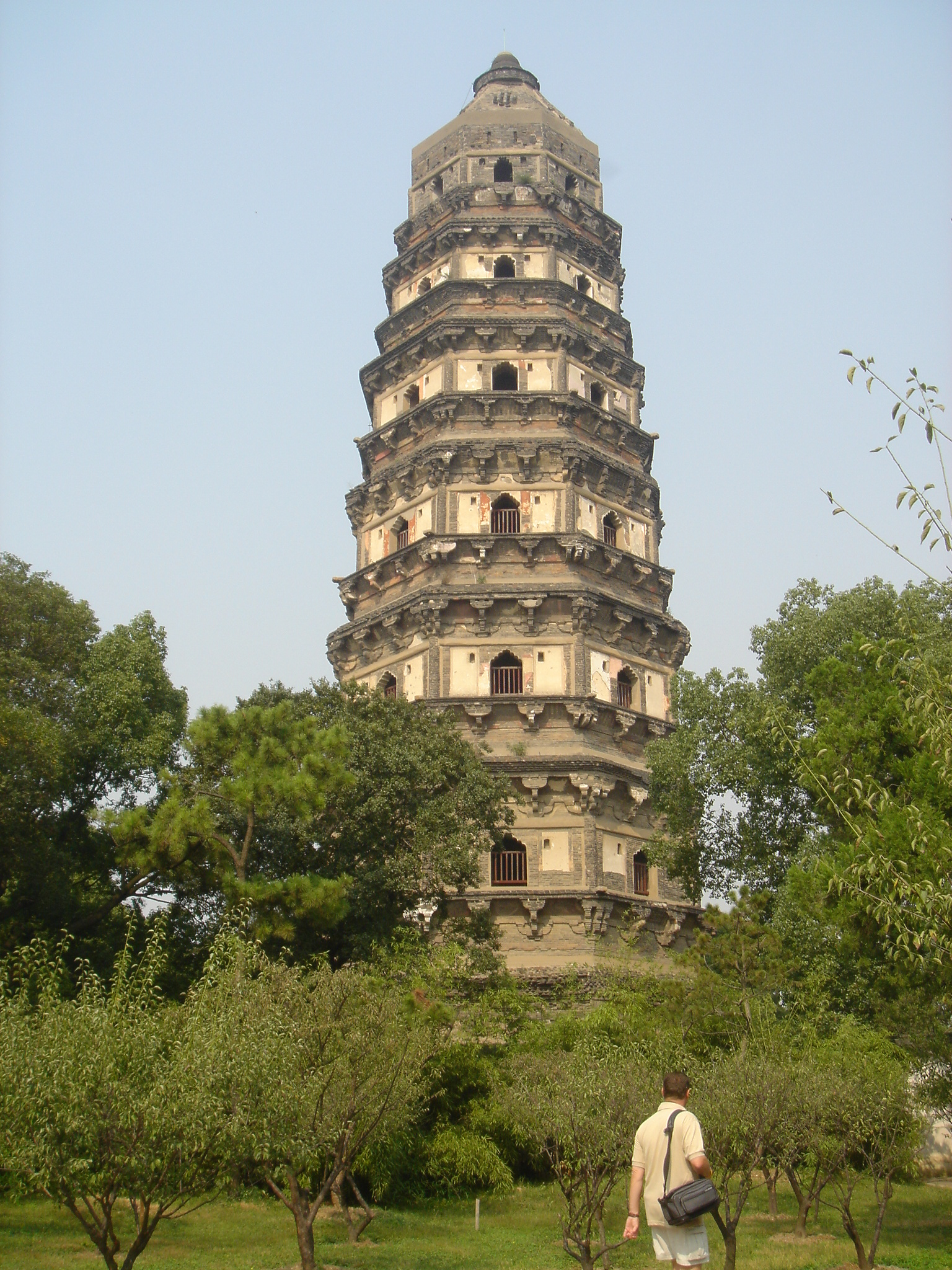
The Yunyan Pagoda, or Huqiu Tower, a tower that is now leaning due to lack of foundational support (half soil, half rock), built during the latter part of the Five Dynasties and Ten Kingdoms era (907–960 AD)

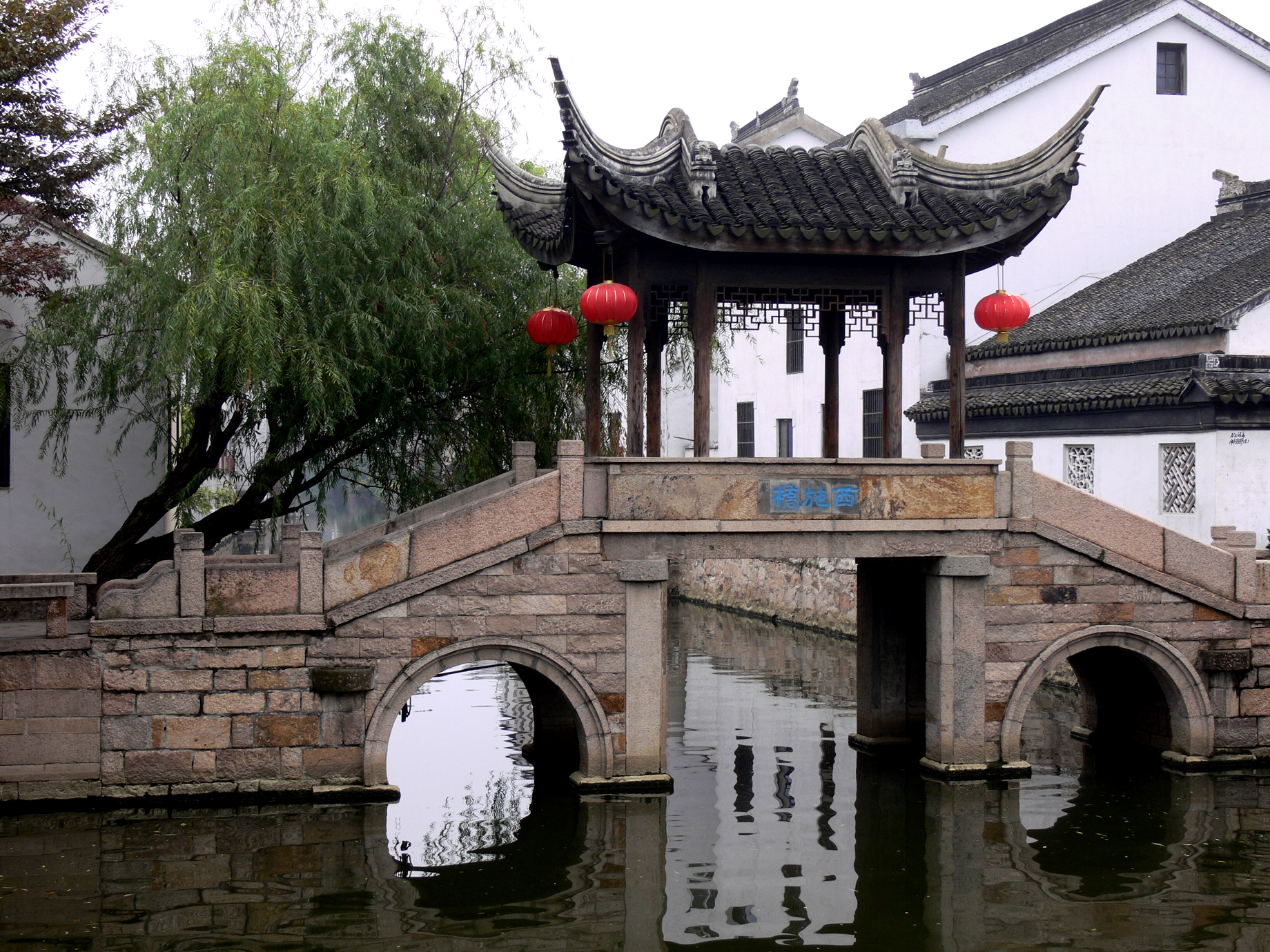
The "xi shi" stone bridge

- Opera: Kunqu originated in the Suzhou region, as does the much later Suzhou Opera. Ballad-singing, or Suzhou pingtan, is a local form of storytelling that mixes singing (accompanied by the pipa and sanxian) with portions in spoken dialect.
- Silk: throughout China's Imperial past, Suzhou silk has been associated with high-quality silk products, supplying silks to ancient royal families. By the 13th century, Suzhou was already the center of the profitable silk trade.
- Song brocade: Suzhou Song-style brocade is one of China's three famous brocades, together with Nanjing Yun brocade and Sichuan Shu brocade. This Song-style brocade, made of silk, has a thin yet strong material with flashy colors, exquisite patterns, and soft texture. Suzhou's brocade production can be traced back to the Five Dynasties. It prospered in the Song dynasty. After the government moved the capital southward, the country's political and cultural center moved to the Yangtze River area.
- Cuisine: Suzhou cuisine (苏帮菜), which is part of Jiangsu cuisine, including Yangcheng Lake large crab, Squirrel fish, etc.
- Handicrafts: Suzhou embroidery, fans, Chinese musical instruments, scroll mounting, lanterns, mahogany furniture, jade carving, silk tapestry, traditional painting pigments of Jiangenxutang Studio, the New Year's wood-block prints of Taohuawu Studio.
- Paintings
- Calligraphic art
- Suzhou Silk Hand Embroidery Art
- Suzhou is the original place of "Jasmine", a song sung by Chinese singers or actresses thousands of times on the occasions of almost every important meeting or celebration. Jasmine is the symbol of Suzhou as well as Tai Hu Lake.
- Suzhou Gardens: Gardens in Suzhou have an ancient history. The first garden in Suzhou belonged to the emperor of the Wu State in the Spring and Autumn period (600 BC). More than 200 gardens existed in Suzhou between the 16th and 18th centuries. Gardens in Suzhou were built according to the style of Chinese paintings. Every view in a garden can be seen as a piece of Chinese painting, and the whole garden is a huge piece of Chinese paintings. At present, the Humble Administrator's Garden, built in the 16th century, is the largest private garden in Suzhou. It belonged to Wang Xianchen, an imperial censor.
- Suzhou embroidery, together with embroidery of Hunan, Sichuan, and Guangdong, is called the "Four Famous Embroideries". Suzhou tapestry method is done in fine silks and gold thread. Other art forms found in this area are sculpture, Song brocade, jade, and rosewood carving. Suzhou embroidery, acknowledged as a cultural heritage, has involved many cultural practitioners in advancing technology and skills with ICH-resources to better engage in economic pursuits.
- The Suzhou Museum has a rich collection of relics from many eras. The collection includes revolutionary records, stele carving, folk customs, drama and verse, Suzhou embroidery, silk cloth, gardens, coins and Buddhist artifacts.
- Wedding gowns

The Suzhou Silk Weaving Technique Inheritance Center, operating under the auspices of the municipal cultural authorities, is dedicated to the live transmission of the Intangible cultural heritage of Song brocade and Kesi weaving. It pairs master artisans with apprentices in a workshop setting that is partially open to the public for observation, ensuring the continuity of these complex craft skills.

== Notable people ==
Lu Xun (陆逊) (183–245) military general and politician of the state of Eastern Wu during the Three Kingdoms era, most famous for his defeat of Liu Bei in the Battle of Xiaoting.

Feng Menglong (冯梦龙) (1574–1645) famous vernacular writer and poet of the late Ming dynasty.

Tang Yin (唐寅) (1470–1524) one of the most renowned painter in China history, calligrapher, and poet of the Ming dynasty, better known by his courtesy name Tang Bohu (Chinese: 唐伯虎)

Wen Zhengming (文徵明) (1470–1559) painter and poet of the Ming dynasty, the founder of Wu School (Chinese: 吴门画派), one of Four Masters of the Ming Dynasty

Weng Tonghe (翁同龢) (1830–1904) Chinese Confucian scholar and imperial tutor of the Tongzhi and Guangxu emperors in the late Qing dynasty, who is one of the most obdurate old guard defending the traditional Confucianism practices while being stubbornly against reform efforts to westernise the country.

I. M. Pei (贝聿铭) (1917–2019) One of the best architects in China history, being recognised as the 'last master of high modernist architecture', famous for his design of Louvre Pyramid, Hong Kong Bank of China tower, Singapore OCBC Centre, East Building of National Gallery of Art in Washington, D.C., Germany Historical Museum, etc.

Cheng Kaijia (程开甲) (1918–2018) A nuclear physicist and engineer. One of the key figure in China's nuclear weapons development and a founding father of the Two Bombs, One Satellite project.

Tsung-Dao Lee (李政道) (1926–2024) Physicist, who won the Nobel Prize in Physics in 1957 at the age of 30, for his work on the violation of the parity law in weak interactions.

Meng Jianzhu (孟建柱) (1947–) Politician, former member of the Politburo and Secretary of the Central Political and Legal Affairs Commission

== Education ==
Suzhou is listed as the #33 cities by scientific output according to the Nature Index 2025.

=== Universities and colleges ===
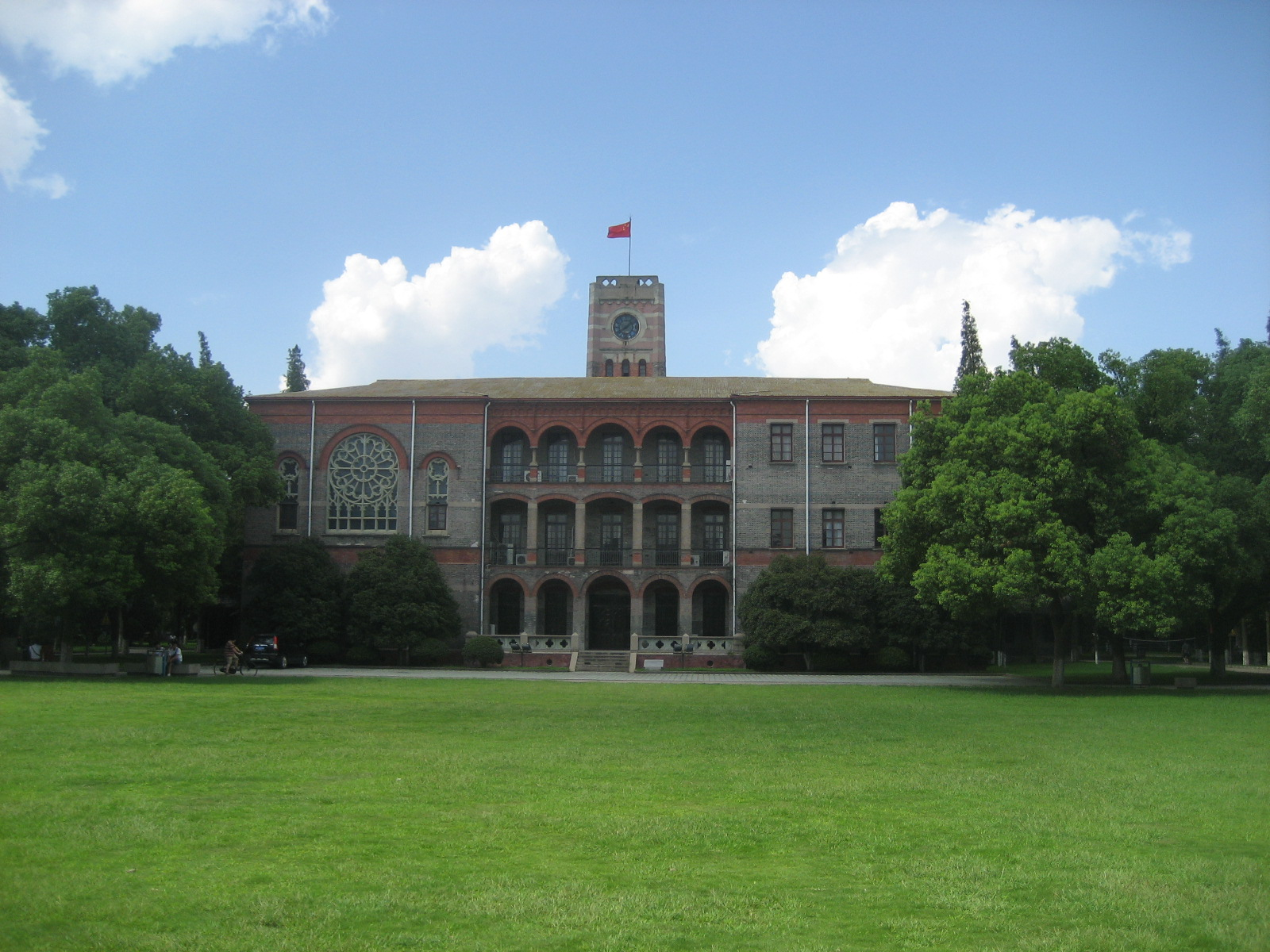
Soochow University

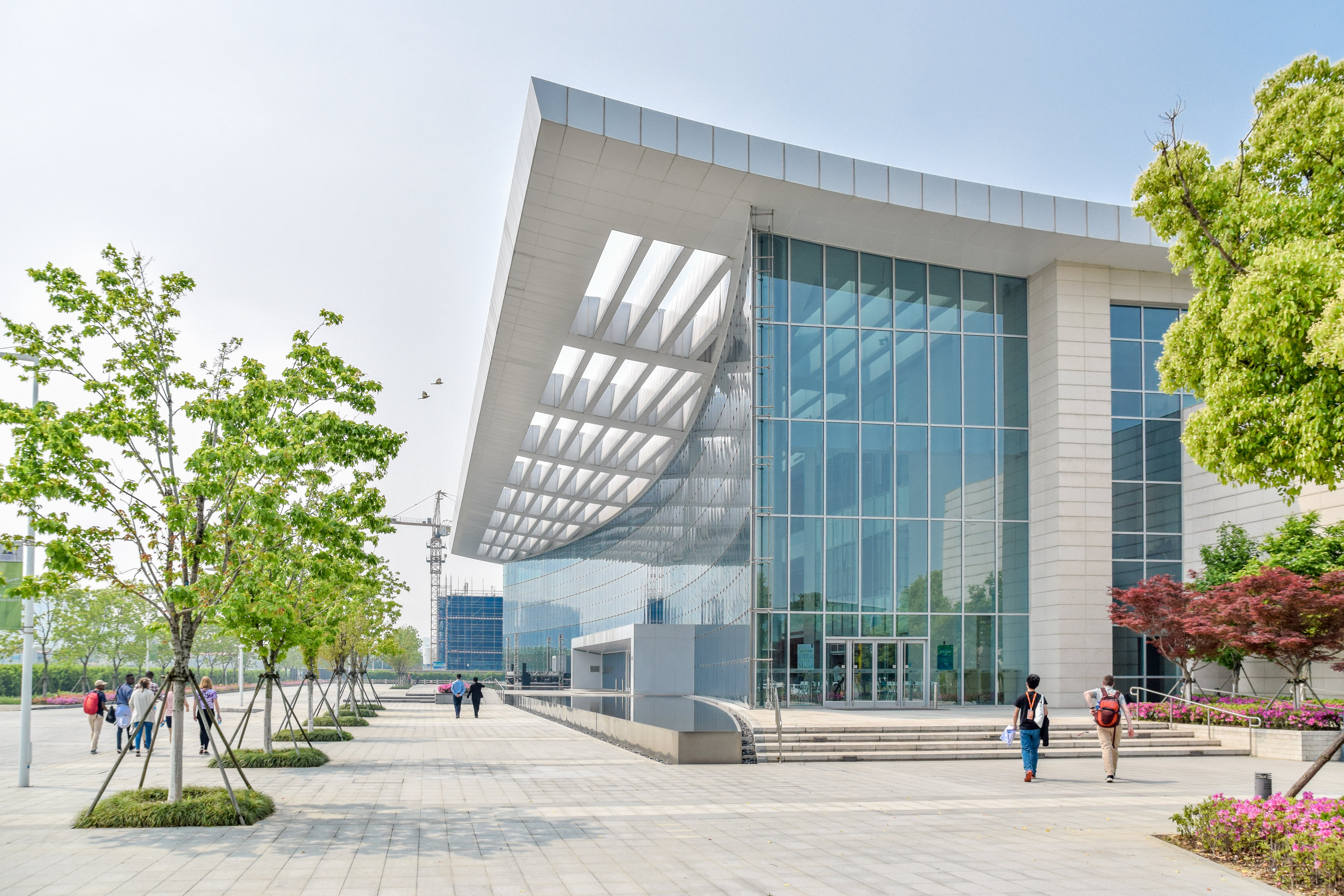
Duke Kunshan University

- Changshu Institute of Technology
- Duke Kunshan University
- KEDGE Business School
- Jiangnan Social University
- Jiangsu University Zhangjiagang Campus
- Nanjing University Suzhou Campus
- Northwestern Polytechnical University Taicang Campus
- Renmin University of China Suzhou Campus
- Skema Business School – Chinese campus of the French business school
- Soochow University
- Suzhou Polytechnic Institute of Agriculture
- Suzhou University of Science and Technology
- Xi'an Jiaotong-Liverpool University
- Suzhou City University

=== High schools ===
- Changshu High School
- Dulwich College Suzhou
- Dulwich International High School Suzhou
- Kunshan Senior High School
- SIP Experimental Middle School
- Suzhou Experimental High School
- Suzhou High School
- Suzhou Singapore International School
- Suzhou No.1 High School
- Suzhou No.10 High School
- Suzhou Wuxian High School (苏州吴县中学)
- Taicang Senior High School
- United World College (UWC) Changshu China
- Zhenze Middle School
- Jiangsu Province Mudu senior High School

=== Postgraduate institutions ===
- Southeast University-Monash University Joint Graduate School
- Suzhou Dushu Lake Higher Education Town (National University of Singapore and Fudan Joint Graduate School, Nanjing University Graduate School, etc.)

=== Others ===
- Japanese School of Suzhou
- Overseas Chinese Academy Chiway Suzhou (苏州工业园区海归人才子女学校)

== See also ==
- List of twin towns and sister cities in China
- Port of Suzhou
- New first-tier city
- Suzhou Library

== External sources ==
- Economic profile: "Market Profiles on Chinese Cities and Provinces : SUZHOU CITY". hktdc.com. Hong Kong Trade Development Council. December 2008. Archived from the original on 27 February 2009.
- Official Resource for English-speaking travelers
- Official website for Suzhou's municipal government
- Suzhou city guide with open directory (Jiangsu Network)
- Geographic data related to Suzhou at OpenStreetMap
