= Suzhou Dushu Lake Higher Education Town =

Area of Suzhou, Jiangsu, China

Coordinates: 31.276336°N 120.726125°E

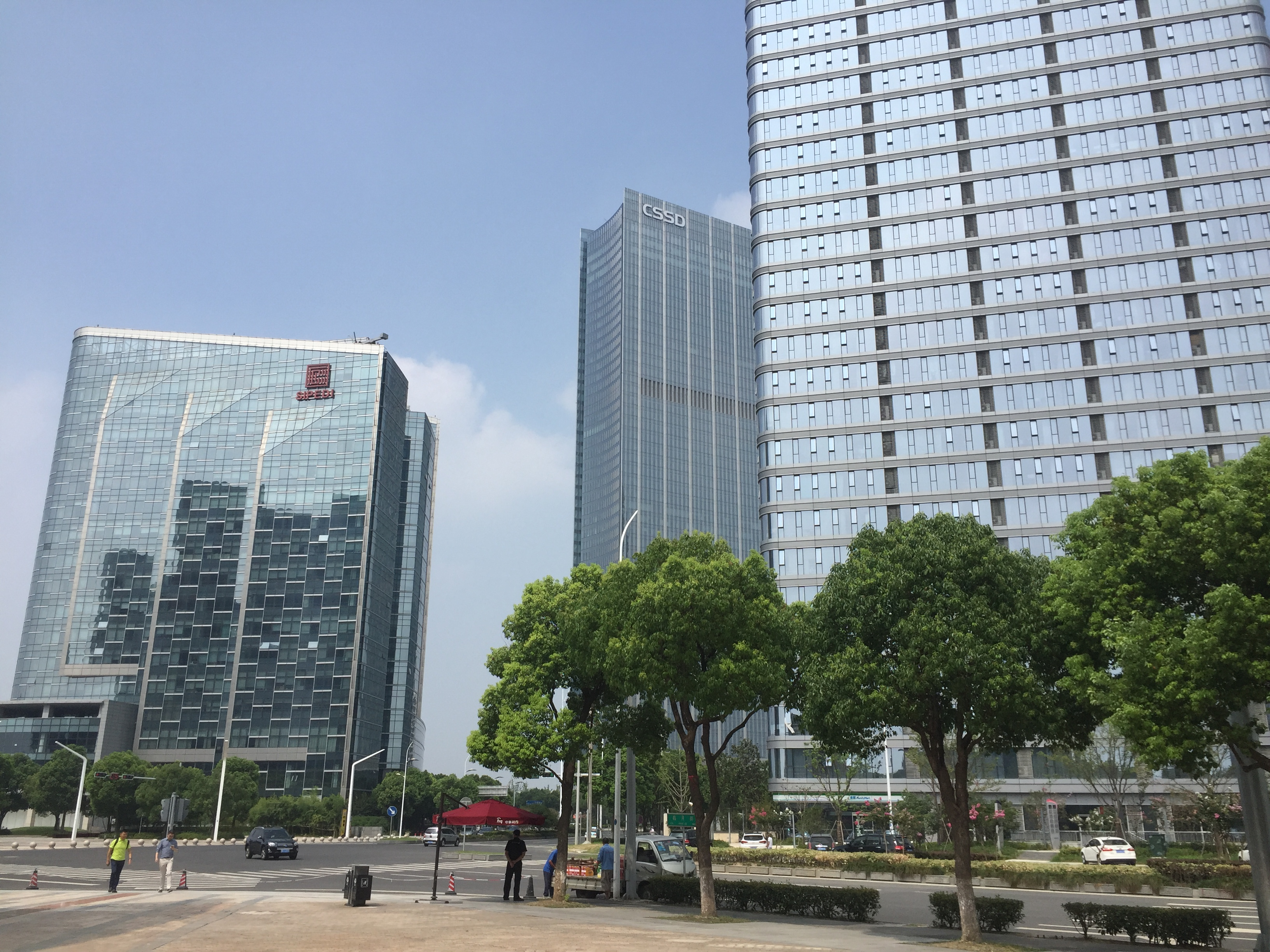
SIPEDI

Suzhou Dushu Lake Higher Education Town (Chinese: 苏州独墅湖高等教育区) is a university town located in the Southern part of Suzhou Industrial Park, Suzhou, Jiangsu, to the East of Dushu Lake, and to the South of Wusong River. It has a total area of 25 km^{2}, and expects to have around 400,000 people by 2016, 100,000 of whom will be students. Its goal is to offer good education, advanced technology, and a pleasant living environment. The area is home to many universities (undergraduate as well as graduate schools) including local Chinese universities and universities from other countries. This community focuses on producing educated and creative people. The area offers facilities including libraries, entertainment venues, parks, a sports centre and accommodation. Wenxing Plaza and Hanlin Plaza are popular locations of many small restaurants and shops. Dushu Lake Library is an experimental library of the National Digital Library.

== Xi'an Jiaotong–Liverpool University ==
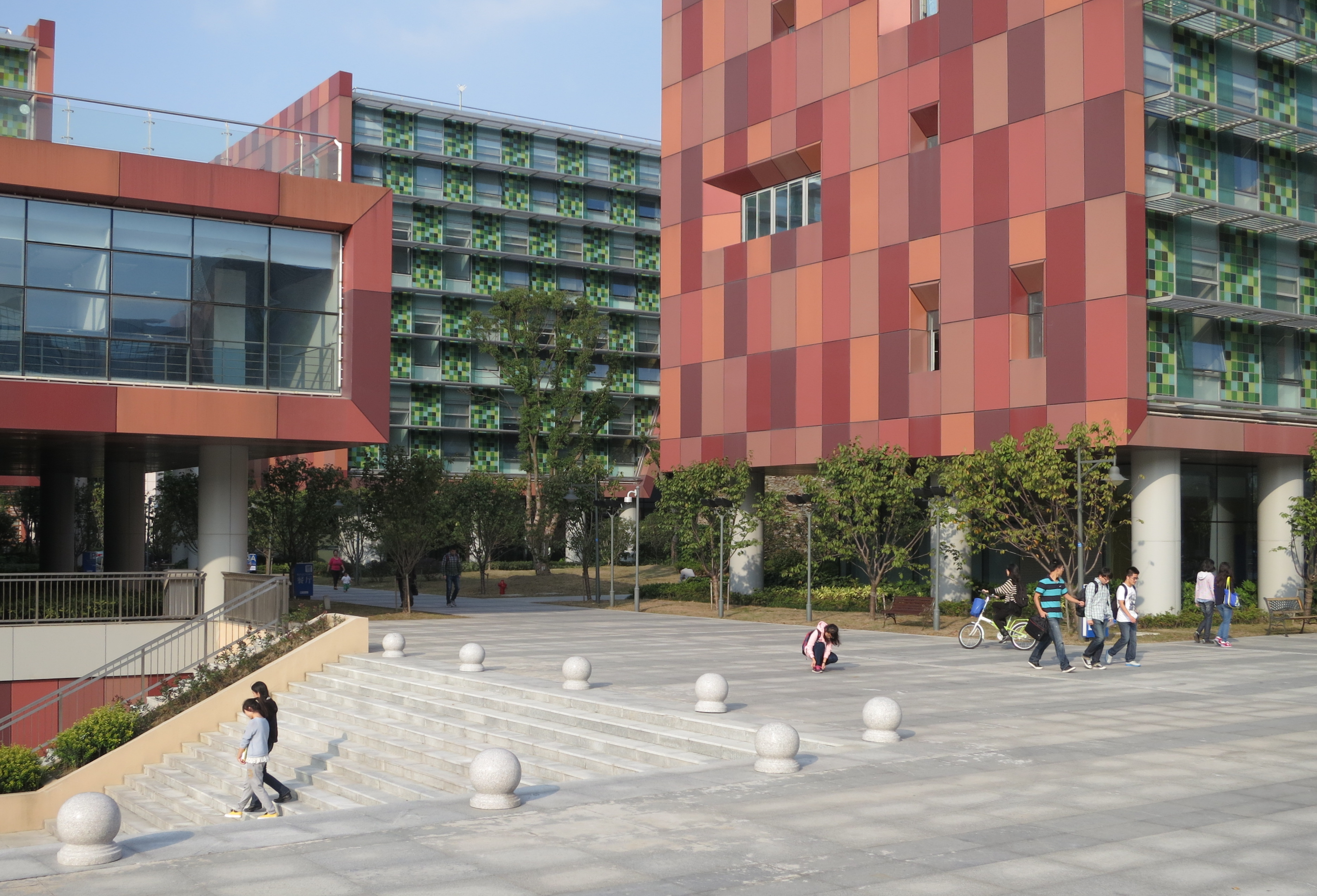
North Campus, Xi'an Jiaotong–Liverpool University, architects: Perkins+Will

In May 2006, Suzhou Industrial Park's Higher Education Town became the location for the first Sino-British University to be approved by the Chinese Ministry of Education when, in partnership with Xi'an Jiaotong University, the University of Liverpool opened a joint University known as the Xi'an Jiaotong–Liverpool University (XJTLU). This is an independent University, offering degree courses in Architecture, Electronics, Communications, Computer Science, and Management (including Financial Mathematics and E-commerce). When fully operational, this independent university will have a student population of up to ten thousand.

== Schools ==
=== Universities ===
- Renmin University of China Suzhou Campus (Sino-French Institute, International College)
- Dushu Lake Campus, Soochow University
- Suzhou Graduate School of Nanjing University
- Xi'an Jiaotong–Liverpool University
- Skema Business School
- Southeast University-Monash University Joint Graduate School
- University of Dayton China Institute

=== Institutes ===
- National University of Singapore (Suzhou) Research Institute
- Suzhou Institute for Advanced Study, University of Science and Technology of China
- Research Institute of Southeast University in Suzhou
- Xi'an Jiaotong University Suzhou Academy
- Suzhou Institute of Shandong University
- Suzhou Institute of Wuhan University
- Suzhou Research Institute, Sichuan University
- Suzhou Institute of Research, North China Electric Power University
- Suzhou Research Center, University of Oxford
- Suzhou Institute for Technology Advancement, University of California, Los Angeles

=== Other schools ===
- Suzhou Industrial Park Institute of Services Outsourcing
- Suzhou Pingtan School
- The Industrial Technology School of Suzhou Industrial Park
- Suzhou Global Institute of Software Technology
- HKU SPACE Global College, Suzhou
- Ulink College of Suzhou Industrial Park
