= Isadora Petrauskas =

Brazilian-Lithuanian performance artist

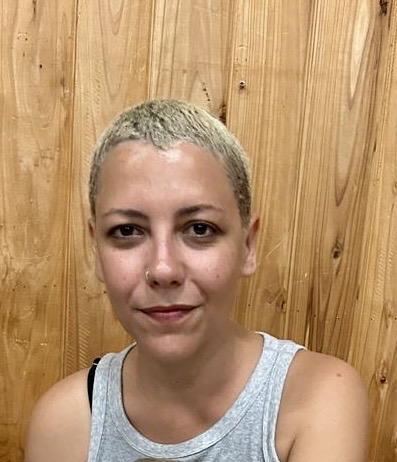
- Petrauskas in 2024
- Born: September 21, 1987 (age 38); Rio de Janeiro, Brazil
- Education: PhD in Fine Arts, University of Porto
- Occupations: Artist, author

Isadora Petrauskas is a Brazilian–Lithuanian multimedia artist, scenographer, and academic. She is a co-founder of the theatre collective Teatro Voador Não Identificado (TVNI), whose work has been featured in Brazilian media outlets such as O Globo, Folha de São Paulo, and O Estado de S. Paulo. Her projects have been developed in Brazil, the United Kingdom, Portugal, and China, combining elements of performance, scenography, and digital media.

== Career ==
Petrauskas has collaborated on multiple productions with TVNI, a group that produces multimedia theatre with political and documentary elements. In 2015, the collective was nominated for the Prêmio Shell de Teatro for its production O Figurante. Other works, including As Mil e Uma Noites and Shuffle, received coverage in national press for their use of personal testimony and mixed-media formats.

In 2020, she presented the solo virtual reality work Tongue-Tied at the Ars Electronica In 2019, she contributed to the Brazilian Pavilion at the Prague Quadrennial.

Her first book, Estados para a Tensão, was published in 2025 by Annablume Editora. The publication collects poetic and theoretical reflections on themes such as embodiment, memory, and tension.

== Academic work ==
Petrauskas holds an MA in Design from Edinburgh Napier University and a PhD in Fine Arts from University of Porto. She has taught at institutions in the United Kingdom and China. As of 2025, she is Associate Professor at Xi’an Jiaotong-Liverpool University (XJTLU), where she teaches in the Academy of Film and Creative Technology.

== Selected works ==
- O Figurante – TVNI, Shell Prize nominee (2015)
- As Mil e Uma Noites – TVNI (2018)
- Tongue-Tied – VR performance, Ars Electronica (2020)
- Estados para a Tensão – Book, Annablume Editora (2025)
