= SSCAC =

SSCAC may refer to:

- South Side Community Art Center, Chicago, United States
- Suzhou Culture and Arts Centre, Suzhou, China (formerly known as Suzhou Science and Culture Arts Centre)
