= Southeast University–Monash University Joint Graduate School =

Postgraduate and research university

The Southeast University–Monash University Joint Graduate School (Chinese: 东南大学-莫纳什大学联合研究生院) is a postgraduate and research university in Suzhou, Jiangsu province, China. The school is situated in the Suzhou Dushu Lake Higher Education Town. It is a joint venture between the Australia-based Monash University and Southeast University (东南大学) in Nanjing. It is the first joint graduate school in China. It consists of both a Joint Graduate School and a Joint Research Institute.

== History ==
Australian universities, including Monash, had for many years sought to establish a physical presence in China. Although it had some teaching and research cooperation with Fudan, Nanjing, Shanghai and Beijing universities, Monash lacked the regulatory approval to operate as a fully fledged university. In 2006, it signed an agreement with Sichuan University, which promised to greatly enlarge the Monash presence in China. In May 2008, the region suffered a major earthquake. This led the region to devote its resources to on its internal recovery, with less scope for international university partnerships.

Australian universities continued to seek collaborations with and campuses in China. In 2011, it was reported that 25 Australian universities had had their applications for licences rejected in that year alone.

In April 2012, it was announced that Monash University had won a full licence to operate as a university in China. The announcement followed several years of cooperation between the two universities and many months of negotiations with the Chinese Ministry of Education.

This was the third time that a university had been granted a licence to operate in China and the first graduate school. The University of Nottingham and the University of Liverpool are the other two foreign universities, although it is widely thought that Duke University and New York University are likely to be granted licences soon.

The main University building was completed in late 2012, as it accepted its first intake of students.

== Location ==
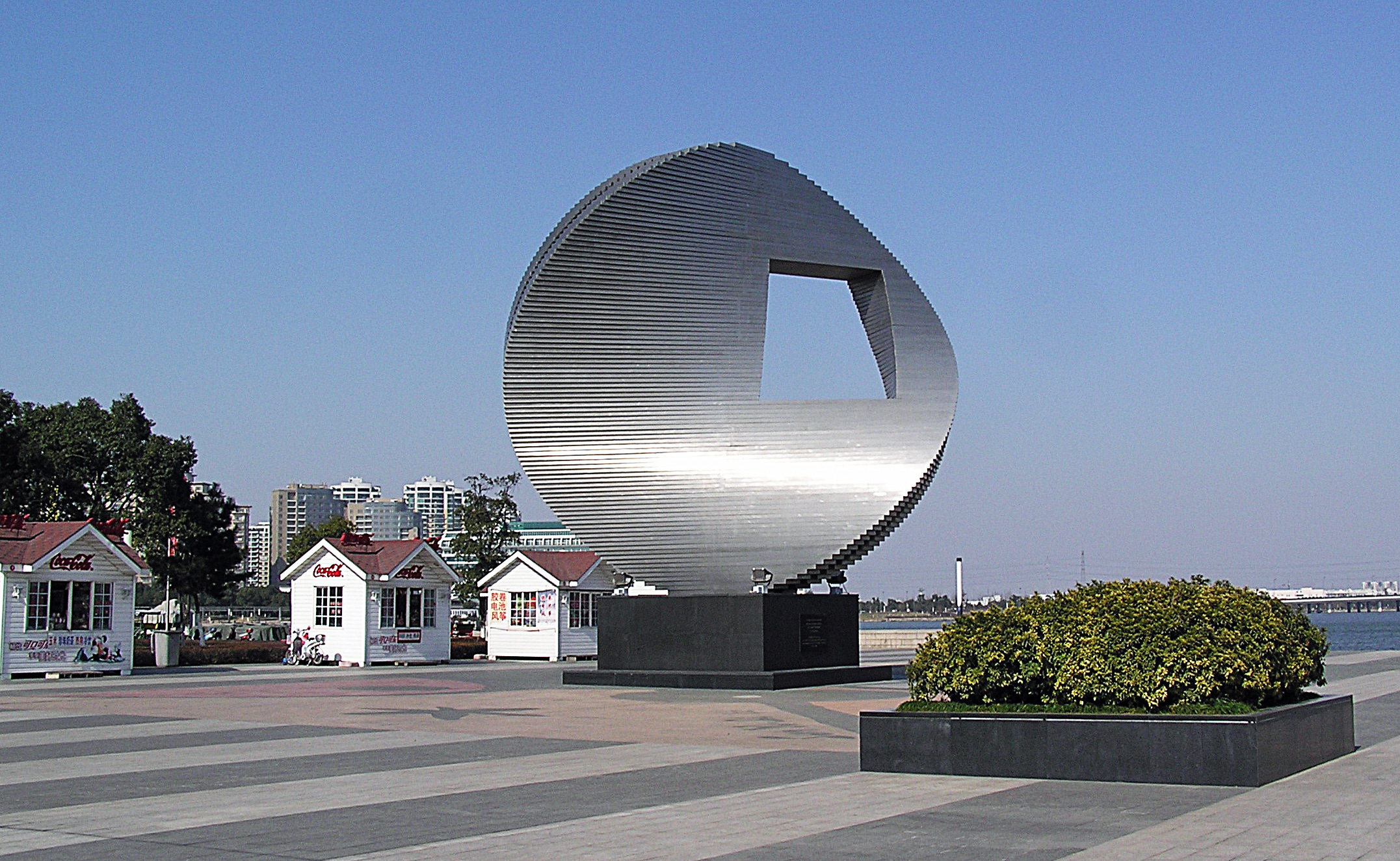
The art sculpture of Harmony, one of the icons in Suzhou Industrial Park

The School is located in Jiangsu province in Suzhou Industrial Park (中国—新加坡苏州工业园区; 中國—新加坡蘇州工業園區). More specifically, it is situated within the Dushu Lake Education Innovation Park.

The Park is home to several thousand foreign companies and research institutes. The School is around 25 minutes by train to Shanghai. The campus is 50 000 square metres, based in an eleven storey, purpose-built facility.

== Teaching and research ==
The School accepts 350 Master's students and 150 PhD students per year. Its student population will grow in coming years, but is expected to be limited to 2000.

The Master's programs are in IT, business, science, engineering, health, humanities and design. The Research Institute offers PhDs in biological engineering, clean energy, drug discovery, economics, food engineering, industrial design, IT, nanotechnology, public health, stem cells, transportation and water.

Classes are conducted in English and students graduate with a degree from both Monash and Southeast University.
