= Jinji Lake =

- 金鸡湖
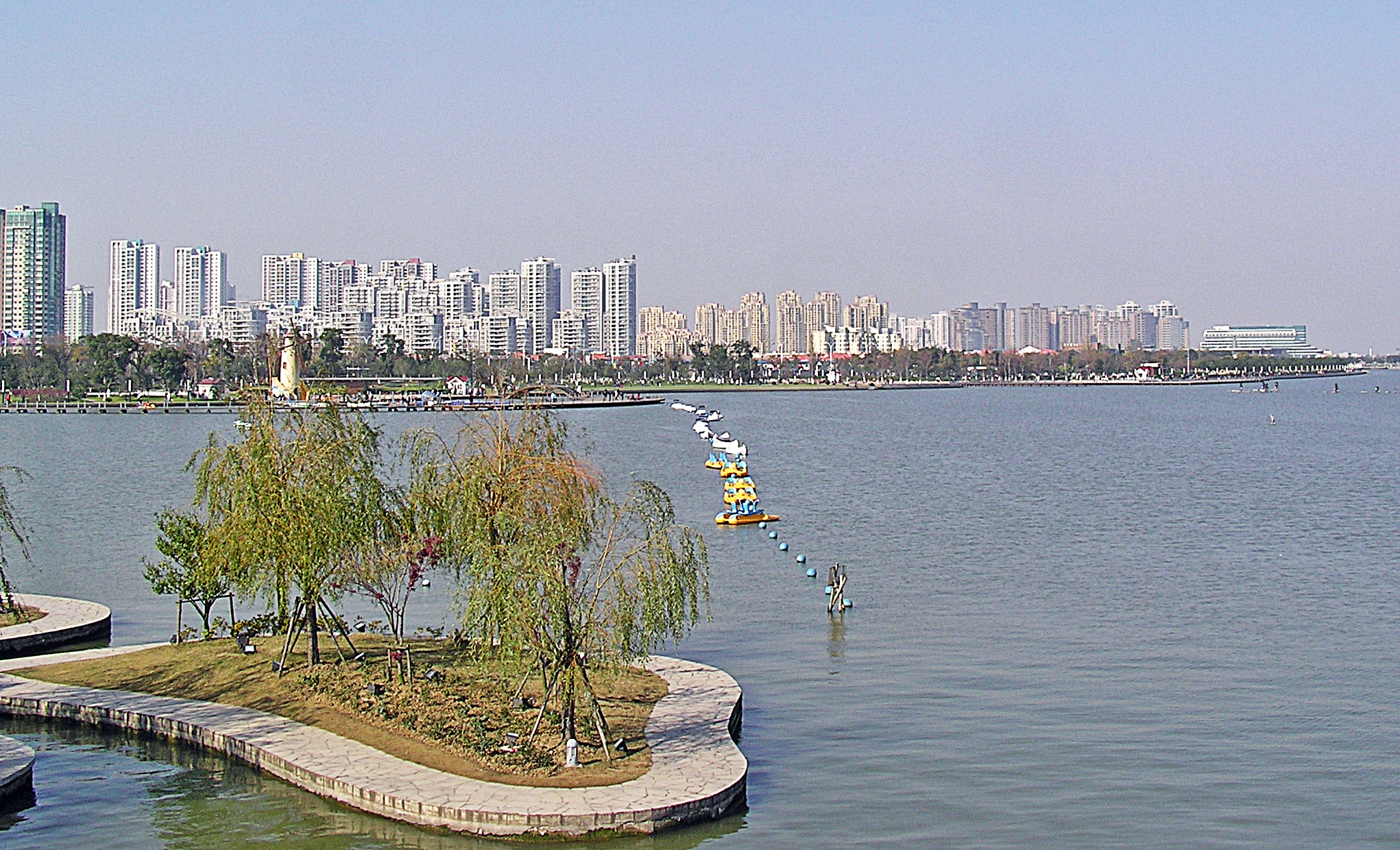
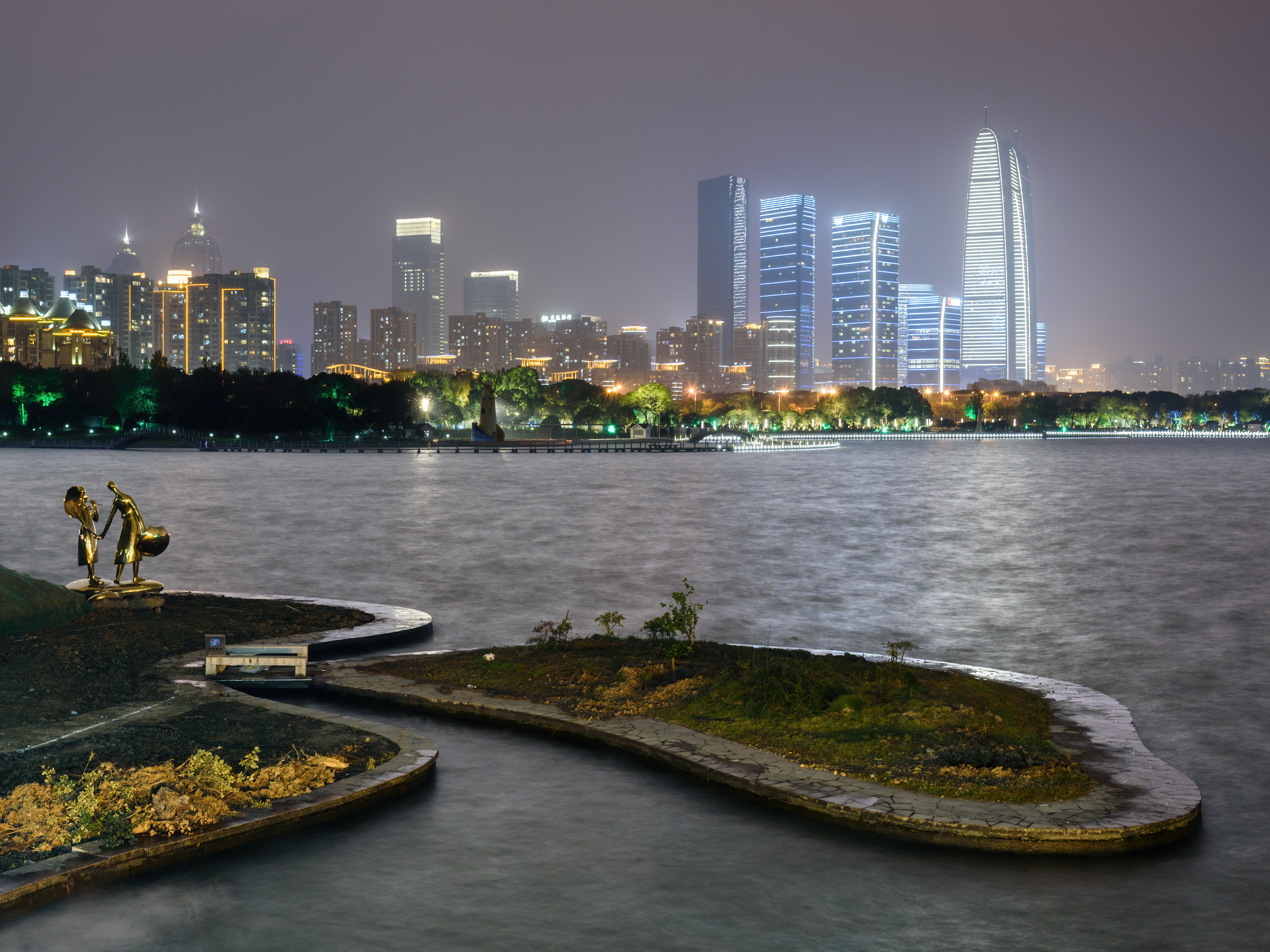
- West bank of Jinji Lake with Suzhou skyline in the background: day (2008, top) and night (2017, bottom)

- Location within Jiangsu
- Location: Suzhou, Jiangsu
- Coordinates: 31.313611°N 120.691667°E
- Type: Fresh water lake
- Basin countries: China
- Average depth: 2.5–3 m (8.2–9.8 ft) (average)
- Islands: 2

Jinji Lake (Chinese: 金鸡湖; pinyin: Jīnjī Hú) is a fresh water lake located in the central part of Suzhou Industrial Park, Jiangsu, China. It occupies an area of 7.18 square kilometers (2.77 sq mi) and its average depth is about 2.5–3 meters (8 ft 2 in – 9 ft 10 in). There are two man-made islands in the lake.

The Suzhou Culture and Arts Centre, which houses the Jinji Lake Art Museum, is located prominently on the shore of the lake.

== History ==
Originally a marshy and shallow pond, Jinji Lake was redeveloped through AECOM's award-winning landscape plan in 2003 into one of China's largest lakefront parks.

== Geography ==
The lake is one of the largest inland lakes in China. The northern and western shores of the lake are concentrated on shopping and entertainment amenities. The green spaces are along the eastern and southern shore.

== See also ==
- Dushu Lake
- Suzhou Ferris Wheel
