= Jinji Lake Art Museum =

Art museum in Suzhou, China

- 金鸡湖美术馆
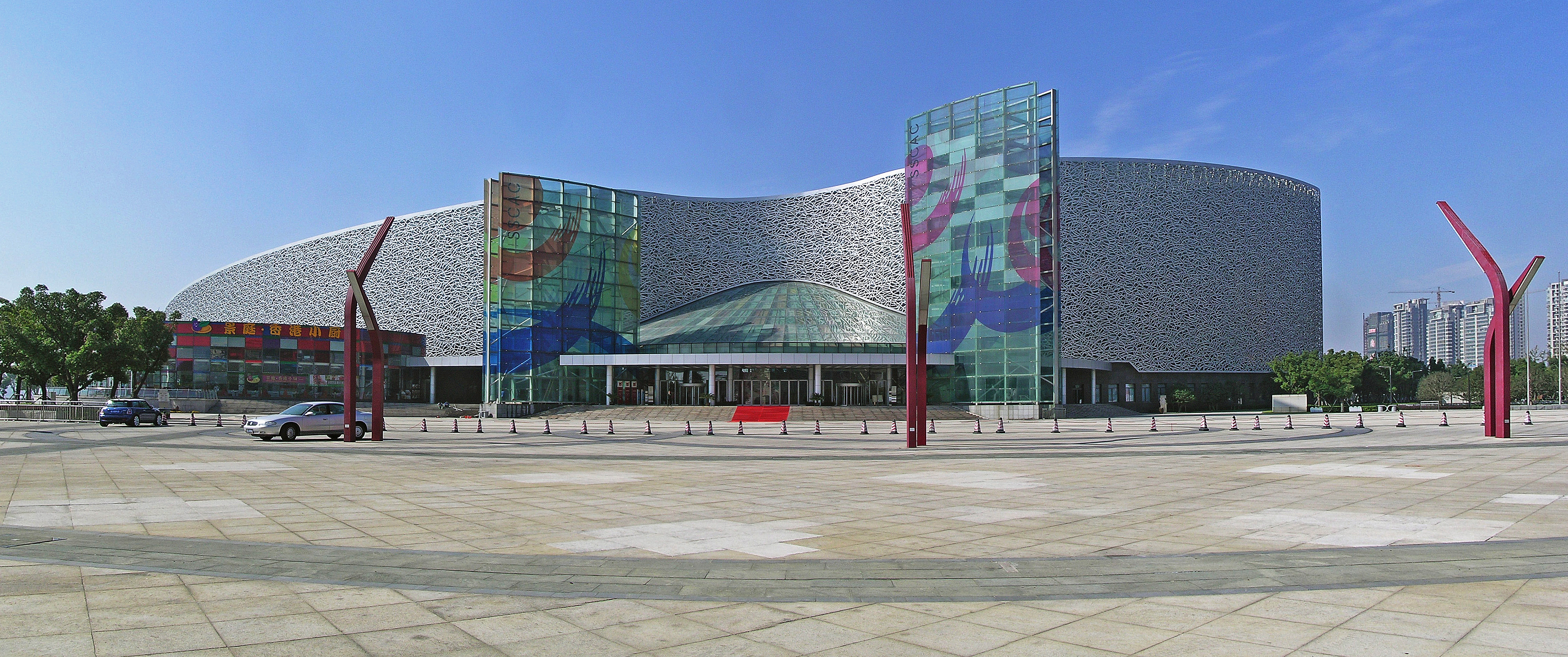
- View of the Suzhou Culture and Arts Centre, which houses the museum
- Established: 2012
- Location: 1 Guanfeng Street, SIP, Suzhou Culture and Arts Centre, Jinji Lake, Suzhou, China
- Type: Art museum

The Jinji Lake Art Museum (Chinese: 金鸡湖美术馆) is a contemporary art museum in Suzhou, China.

The museum is located on Jinji Lake in Suzhou, in the Suzhou Culture and Arts Centre (Chinese: 苏州文化艺术中心). It displays contemporary art, presenting temporary exhibitions by both Chinese and international artists, together with artworks specifically connected with Suzhou. There are four galleries with around 2,000 square meters of exhibition space. Programmes also include talks, workshops, and related public art activities. The museum receives more than 100,000 visitors annually.

During 2024–2025, there was an exhibition entitled "Animated Body" by Tian Mu.

== See also ==
- Suzhou Museum
- List of museums in China
