= Suzhou Industrial Park No. 5 Middle School =

School in Weiting town, Jiangsu province, China

Suzhou Industrial Park No. 5 Middle School (Chinese: 苏州工业园区第五中学) was established in 1958. It was rebuilt in 1999 with an investment of nearly 20 million yuan and moved to Weiting town, Suzhou Industrial Park, Jiangsu province. The new school occupies an area of nearly 100 mu and it is a nine-year compulsory school.

Since 2001, the school has adopted the idea that "scientific research helps a lot in teaching, the quality of school legislation, social integration, the penetration of life".

The school has opened elective courses to all the students, including science, carving art, paper craft, horticultural science, and others.
