= Suzhou Creek =

Suzhou Creek Wusong River (吴淞江)
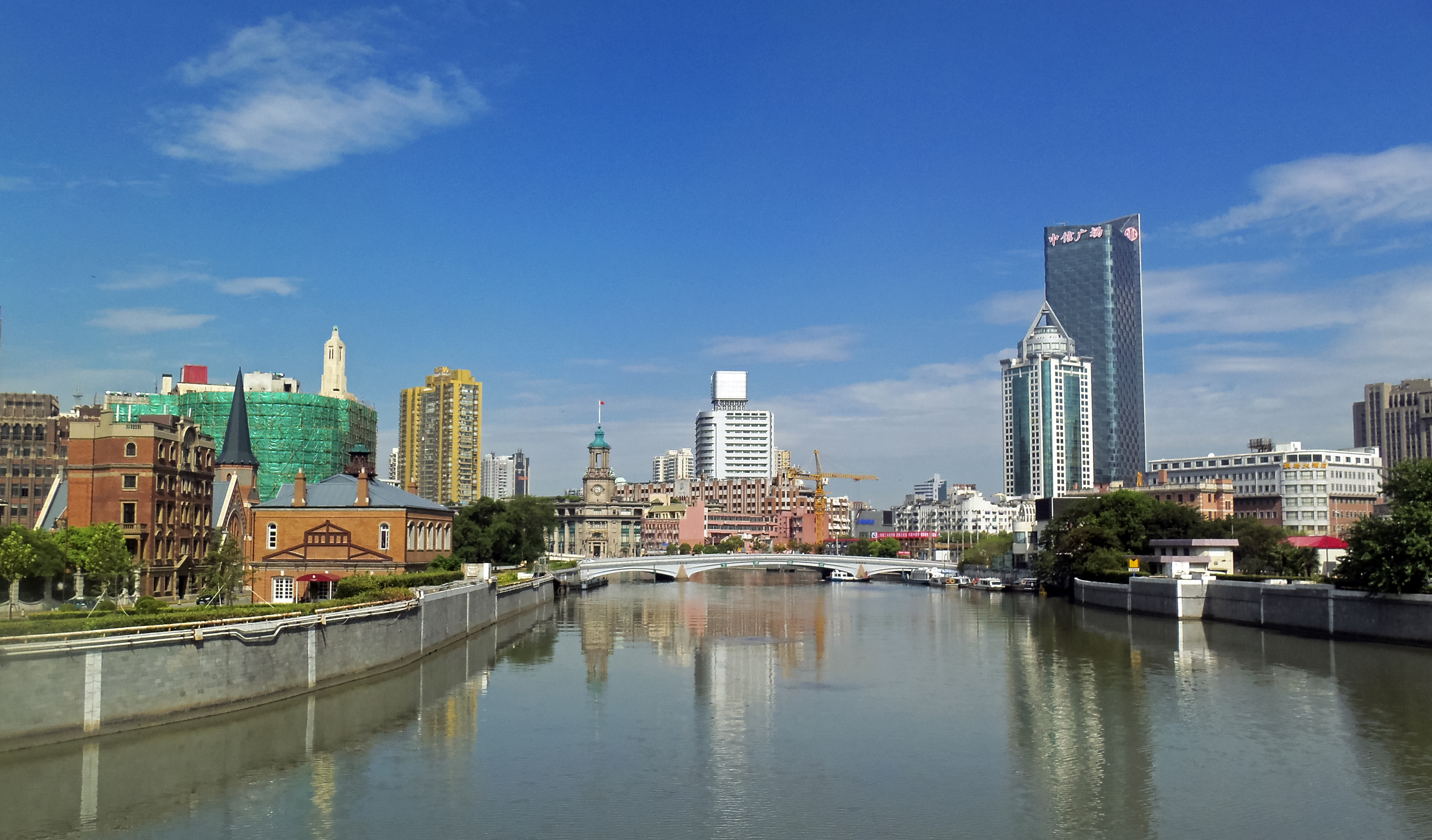
- Suzhou Creek from Waibaidu Bridge
- Etymology: Suzhou and Wusong
- Native name: 苏州河

Location
- Country: China
- Province-level divisions: Jiangsu, Shanghai
- City: Suzhou, Shanghai

Physical characteristics
- Source: Lake Tai
  - location: Suzhou, Jiangsu
  - coordinates: 31°5′35″N 120°35′9″E
- Mouth: Huangpu River
  - location: Shanghai
  - coordinates: 31°14′41″N 121°29′13″E
- Length: 125 km (78 mi)

Basin features
- River system: Huangpu River

Suzhou Creek
- Traditional Chinese: 蘇州河
- Simplified Chinese: 苏州河
- Postal: Soochow River
- Literal meaning: Suzhou River
Transcriptions
Standard Mandarin
- Hanyu Pinyin: Sūzhōu Hé
- Wade–Giles: Su^{1}-chou^{1} Ho^{2}

Wusong River
- Traditional Chinese: 吳淞江
- Simplified Chinese: 吴淞江
- Postal: Woosung River
- Literal meaning: Wusong River
Transcriptions
Standard Mandarin
- Hanyu Pinyin: Wúsōng Jiāng
- Wade–Giles: Wu^{2}-sung^{1} Chiang^{2}

Suzhou Creek (or Soochow Creek) (Chinese: 苏州河), also called the Wusong (Woosung) River (吴淞江), is a river that passes through Shanghai city centre. A sandbar within the river was the cause of navigation issues for the Port of Shanghai until dredging works designed and supervised by Johannis de Rijke, George Arnold Escher and others was completed in 1928. It is named after the neighbouring city of Suzhou (Soochow), Jiangsu, the predominant settlement in this area prior to the rise of Shanghai as a metropolis.

One of the principal outlets of Lake Tai in Wujiang District of Suzhou, Suzhou Creek is 125 km (78 mi) long, of which 54 km are within the administrative region of Shanghai and 24 km within the city's highly urbanized parts. It flows into the Huangpu River at the northern end of the Bund in Huangpu District.

== History ==
The river was originally called "Song Jiang" ("Pine River"). When the former Huating Fu (Prefecture) was renamed Songjiang Fu in 1278, the river's name was changed to "Wusong River".

The Wusong River formerly entered the mouth of the Yangtze at the same point where today the Huangpu River enters the Yangtze estuary; this point is even today called the "Wusongkou" or "Mouth of the Wusong" (Chinese: 吳淞口; pinyin: Wúsōng kǒu).

The mouth of the river was known in the 4th-5th century CE (Jin dynasty) as 滬瀆 (沪渎, Hù Dú, lit "Harpoon Ditch"), at which time it was the main conduit into the ocean; the contraction 沪 (Hù) is today the official abbreviation for Shanghai.

=== From principal outlet to tributary ===
The first recorded works on the river was the building of levees along part of the river bank in 810AD. In 1042, the entire course of the river from Lake Tai to the sea was embanked. The river gradually silted up, and a series of works were undertaken in the 11th century to eliminate bends in the course of the river, in an attempt to speed up water flow and prevent further silting. However, silting continued, necessitating constant dredging and the periodic cutting of new channels. In 1109, 12 sluice gates were completed in the lower reaches of the river in order to control the effect of silt from the nearby and much larger Yangtze River. These works allowed the river to remain a commercial artery during the Song and Yuan dynasties: even as late as 1277, sea-faring merchant ships could sail up the river to reach the gates of Suzhou. By the early 14th century, however, repeated major dredging works were again necessary to maintain the channel. By the late 14th century, during the early Ming dynasty, the lower reaches of the river had almost entirely become land. A major tributary, the Huangpu River, was similarly affected by silt. In 1403, a major flood affected the area. In response, Xia Yuanji, the Vice Minister of Revenue, devised a plan for major works in what is now the Shanghai area. Water from Lake Tai was partially diverted via the Huangpu, and both the Huangpu and the Wusong were joined to the Fanjiabang canal as their channel to the mouth of the Yangtze and the sea. Further works during the Ming dynasty established the Huangpu as the main conduit, and by 1569, after dredging works directed by Hai Rui, the relative arrangement of the two channels became established: the Wusong River flowed into the Huangpu near today's Waibaidu Bridge, and the combined channel flowed to the Mouth of the Wusong via the Fanjiabang channel. In the region of today's central Shanghai, Wusong River was by 1569 a narrow channel of about 50 meters (160 ft) wide on the surface, and half that width at the bottom.

=== Modern era: strategic significance ===
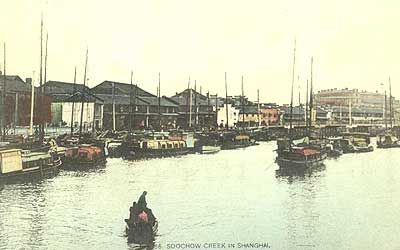
Suzhou Creek during the Qing dynasty.

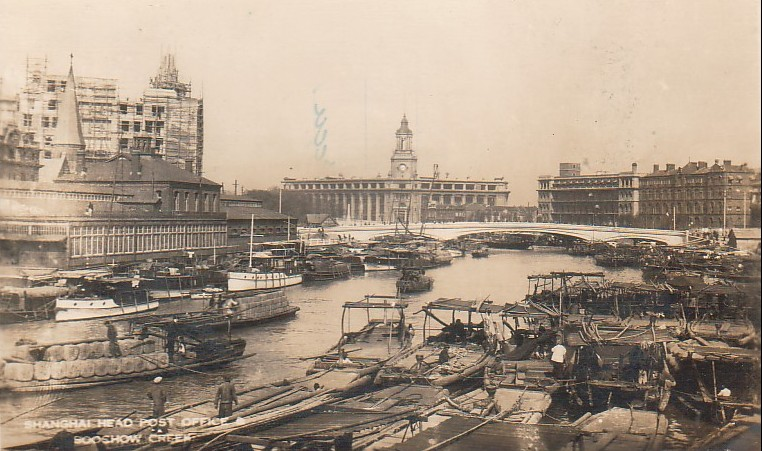
View of the General Post Office in the 1920s from Garden Bridge.

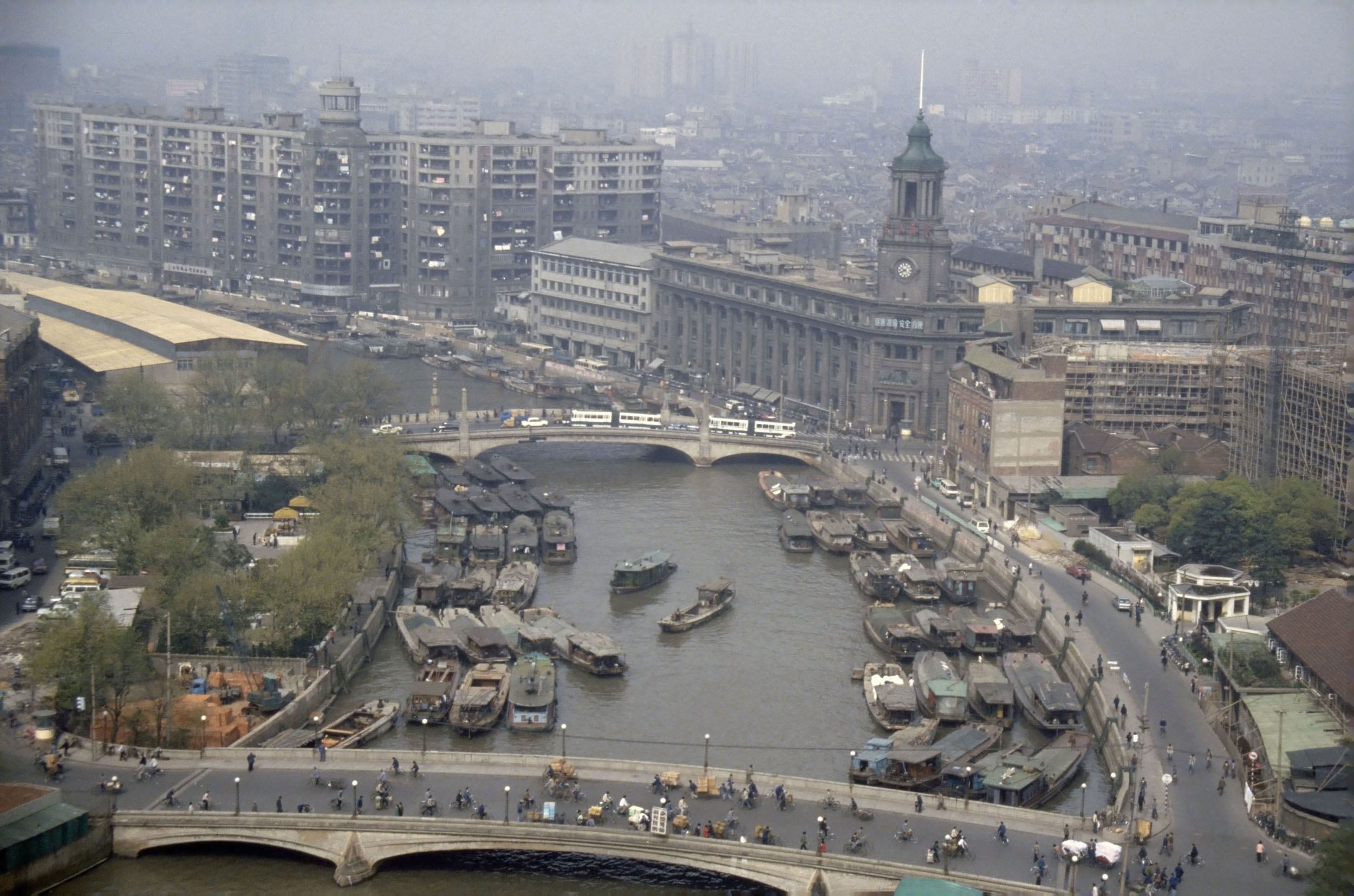
View of the General Post office in 1987.

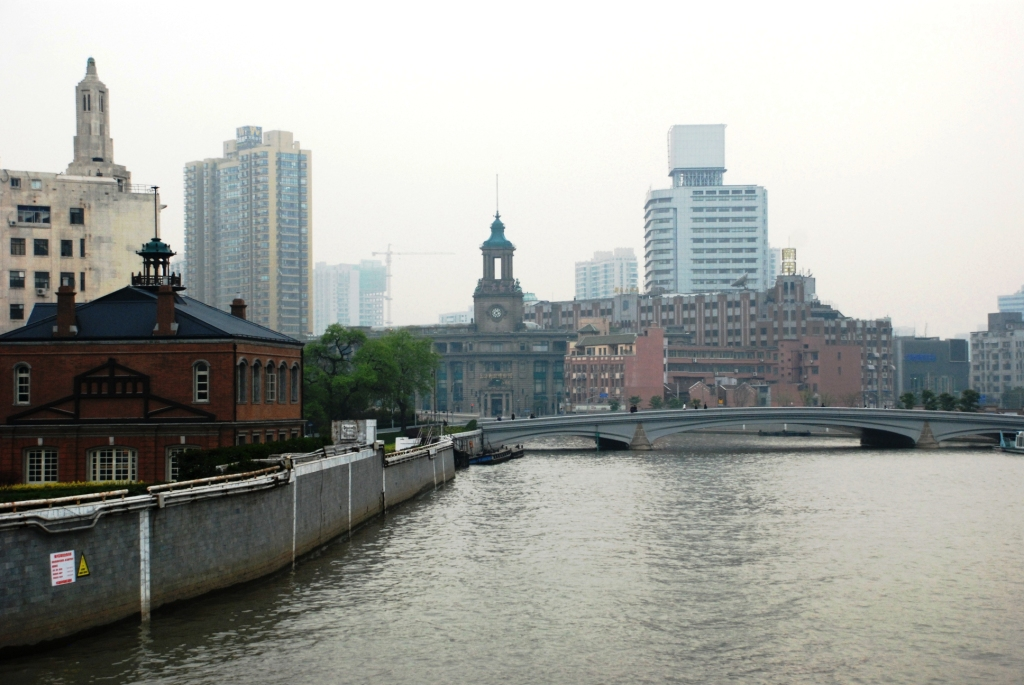
View of the General Post Office in 2011 from Garden Bridge (shortly after the demolition of Wusong Road Gate Bridge).

Suzhou Creek has played an important role for being the demarcation line between political spheres of influences throughout Shanghai's history. After the Treaty of Nanjing forced China to open up in 1842 and Shanghai became an international trade port, the river formed the boundary between the British concession (Southern bank) and the American settlement (Northern bank) until both concessions were merged into the International Settlement in 1863. When the Japanese invaded Shanghai in 1937, the river formed the boundary between the International Settlement (South) and the Japanese concession (North).

The Wusong River acquired its modern name in the mid-19th century: because it connected Shanghai with Suzhou, it was called "Soochow Creek" in English, and the popular Chinese name was a back translation from the English. The first documented mention of "Soochow Creek" occurred in the 1848 version of the Shanghai Land Regulations, the rules which governed the foreign concessions of Shanghai. From there, the name entered popular parlance, and "Suzhou Creek" is now the predominant name used in Shanghai. However, "Wusong Creek" remains in use in some official contexts and is the name used by upstream residents closer to Suzhou.

=== Trade route ===
Due to Shanghai's role as trade port, from the 1930s Suzhou Creek was an important shipping route, facilitating the transport of goods into the interior of China. Along the river banks, a multitude of warehouses and factories were built at this time, making the region close to the river a significant industrial area.

In the course of urbanization, local industries withdrew from the city center, leaving the warehouses and factories abandoned. Up to this point, the river had been heavily polluted by industries as well as domestic waste water, making Suzhou Creek locally known as "the smelly river", the most polluted river in Shanghai since the 1920s.

=== Redevelopment and future ===
Since 1992, the Shanghai Municipal Government has been pursuing a redevelopment of the area. In 1998, authorities launched the Suzhou Creek Rehabilitation Project, a 12-year-program to improve the water quality, mitigate flood impact, introduce wastewater and water resource management and push for urban revitalization and a higher living standard in the desolated areas along Suzhou River. In the meantime, Suzhou River is considered clean enough to host annual rowing competitions.

Originally, most old factories and warehouses along Suzhou River were set be demolished to make way for construction of modern high-rise buildings in Shanghai's fast-developing city center, aiming at a social and economic regeneration of the Suzhou River area. However, following initiatives of artists in the late 1990s, the riverside area has been designated as a protected heritage zone and many warehouses have been conserved, now providing quarters for Shanghai's flourishing art scene.

In 2002, new plans for the redevelopment of the Suzhou Creek's riverfront were approved. These plans, based upon proposals by three international firms, call for the construction of entertainment facilities and 1 square kilometer (250 acres) of parks along the downtown section of Suzhou Creek between Zhongshan Park and its confluence with Huangpu River, aiming to raise the commercial attractiveness of this central part of the river. New structures include shops, bars and a total of 95 greenbelts at the banks of the river, which are supposed to be planted by 2010, the time the Suzhou Creek Rehabilitation Project is completed. While some areas already leased to investors will have to be reclaimed and old residential and industrial facilities are supposed to be replaced, authorities assert that the protection of historical buildings, especially warehouses, will be respected.

From 2007 to 2010, the Bund Tunnel was constructed under the Bund and the mouth of the Suzhou Creek. The construction of the tunnel was designed to relieve the heavy traffic through the Bund area. It rendered obsolete the late 20th century concrete Wusong Road Gate Bridge at the mouth of Suzhou Creek, which had impacted the streetscape and sightlines in the Bund area, allowing it to be removed. The tunnel replaced the road transport function of the bridge (and its water control function was replaced by the new Jinshan Road Gate). The concrete road bridge and flood gate, which was built to the west of Garden Bridge to relieve traffic from the historic bridge, was criticized by some for affecting the historic views between Garden Bridge and landmarks further up Suzhou Creek (such as the General Post Office Building). Wusong Road Gate Bridge was demolished in 2009, prior to the completion of the Bund Tunnel.

== Places along the river ==
Due to its location in the former International Settlement, a number of landmarks from that period can be found along or close to Suzhou Creek. Following the river westward from its confluence, important or famous places include:

- Huangpu Park and the northern end of the Bund
- Astor House
- Consulate-General of Russia
- Fotografiska Shanghai
- Shanghai Mansions (previously Broadway Mansions)
- People's Hospital No. 1
- Shanghai General Post Office
- Suzhou Creek Art District ("M50")
- Sihang Warehouse

In the Suzhou area, where the same river is rather called Wusong River, it passes by Suzhou Industrial Park and Suzhou Dushu Lake Higher Education Town, and connects via Huodi Pond and Dushu Lake to the Grand Canal.

== Bridges ==
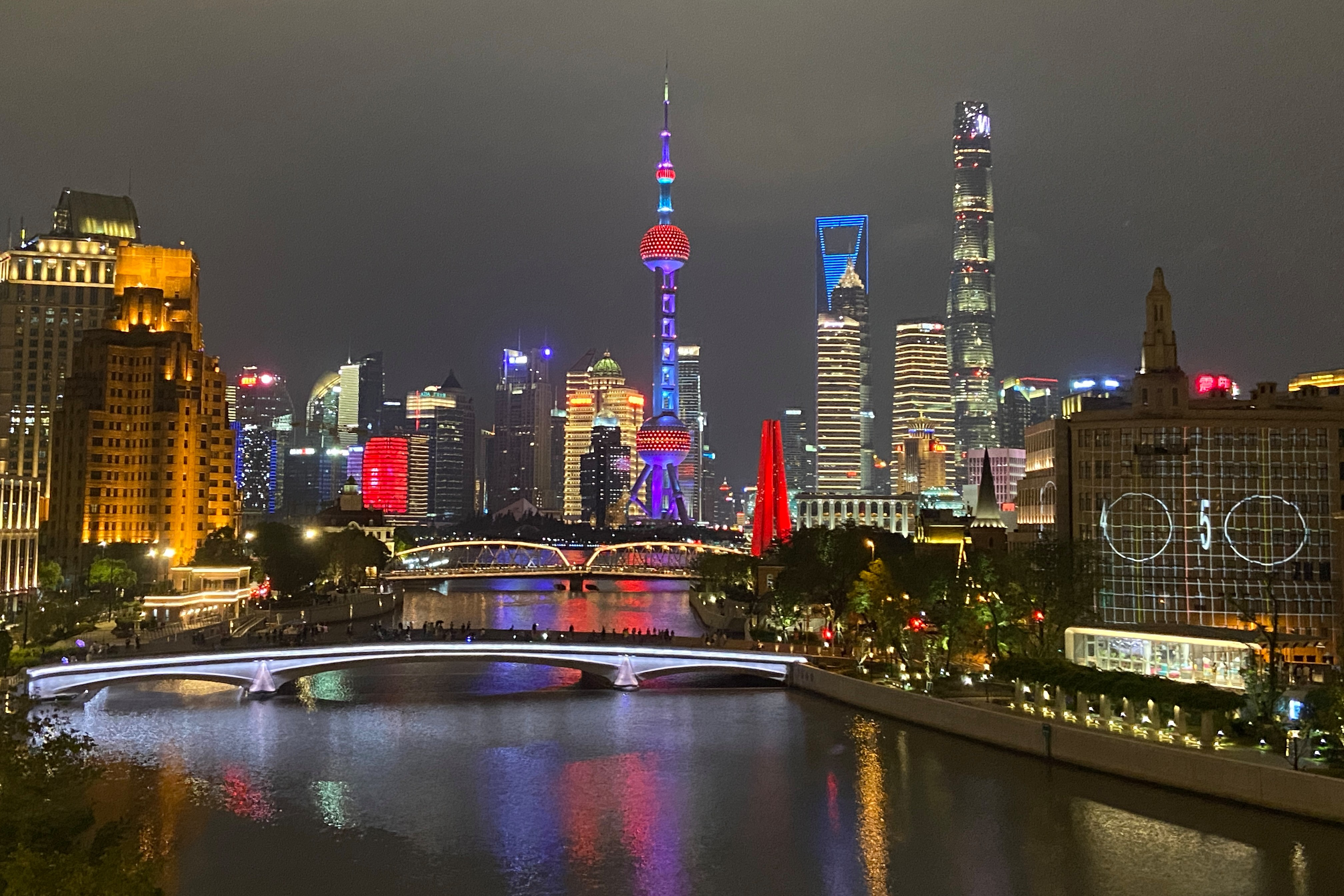
The confluence of Suzhou Creek with Huangpu River, viewed from the General Post Office. Zhapu Road Bridge and Waibaidu Bridge are visible. Lujiazui is in the distance.

Suzhou Creek is crossed by a number of distinctive bridges, often European in style, the most famous one being Waibaidu Bridge (Garden Bridge) right at its confluence with Huangpu River.

Facilitating north–south traffic in the ever-growing metropolis, a number of new bridges are currently being constructed. Gubei Road bridge, to be opened in late 2006, will be the longest bridge over the waterway. By 2007, there will be thirty bridges spanning Suzhou Creek in Shanghai. In the Suzhou area, another 18 bridges are crossing the river as of 2015.

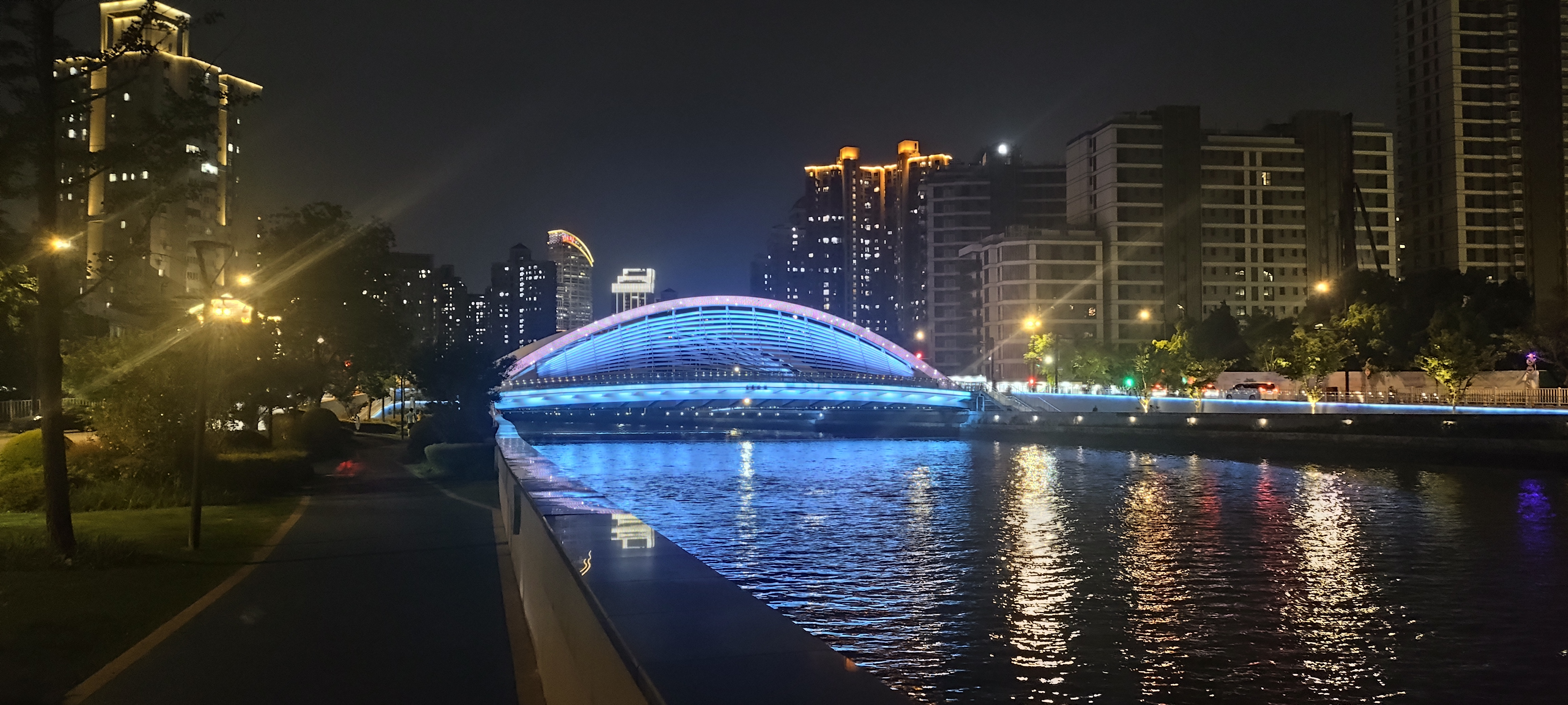
Anyuan Road Bridge, Shanghai, completed December 2022

== In the media ==
The Suzhou Creek plays a pivotal role in Lou Ye's film Suzhou River, which shows the lives of ordinary people living in the old quarters of the northern bank of the river at the turn of the millennium, rather than showcasing modern Shanghai.

In the film Empire of the Sun, Suzhou Creek has an concentration camp/POW camp near an airfield.
