= Suzhou Industrial Park =

Suzhou Industrial Park 苏州工业园区
- District
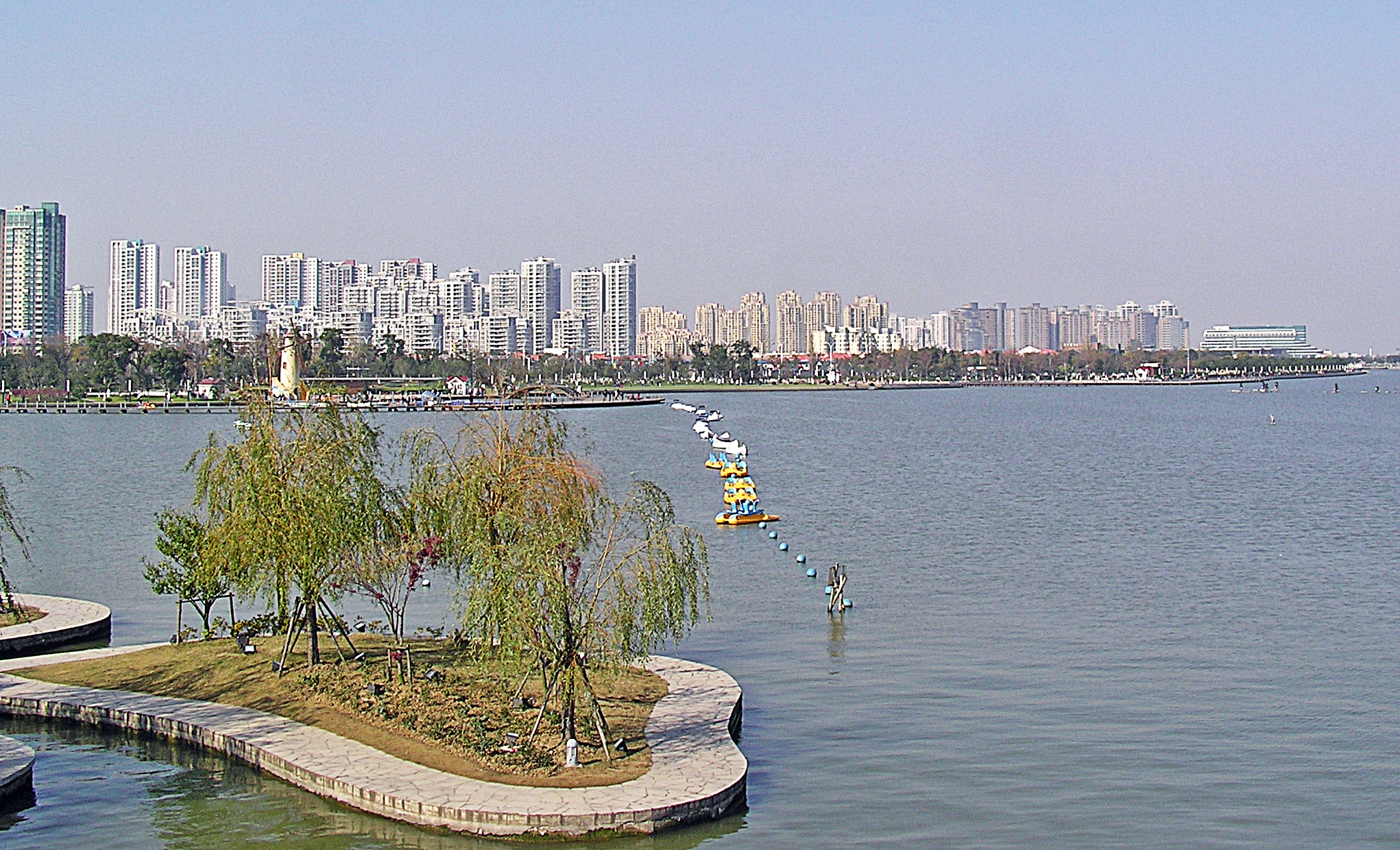
- The park with the west bank of Jinji Lake
- Interactive map of Suzhou Industrial Park
- Coordinates: 31°19′26″N 120°43′24″E
- Country: China
- Province: Jiangsu
- Prefecture-level city: Suzhou

Area
  - Total: 278 km^{2} (107 sq mi)

Population (2019)
  - Total: 807,800
  - Density: 2,910/km^{2} (7,530/sq mi)
- Time zone: UTC+8 (China Standard)
- Website: www.sipac.gov.cn/english/

The Suzhou Industrial Park (苏州工业园区) is a major development zone located in Suzhou, Jiangsu, China. It was formally established in February 1994 as part of China's broader reform and opening up efforts under a bilateral agreement between the Chinese and Singaporean governments. The project was envisioned as a showcase for modern, international standards in urban planning, economic development and public administration, drawing on Singapore's experience in integrated development and effective governance.

Soon after its launch, the park encountered significant difficulties due largely to diverging expectations between China and Singapore, particularly regarding land use priorities and commercial direction. Singapore's vision for long-term planning, transparency and high standards was often undercut by inconsistent local implementation on the Chinese side, which eventually led to Singapore's partial pullout. Despite these early setbacks, the project eventually advanced thanks to Singapore's sustained technical input and governance approach.

These contributions laid the foundation for the park's turnaround and provided a benchmark for future joint developments across China. Today, the Suzhou Industrial Park has grown into one of the most prominent industrial zones in the country, covering 278 square kilometres (107 mi^{2}) and supporting 807,800 permanent residents as of 2019. It has since drawn a wide range of multinational corporations and high-tech firms, alongside integrated residential and commercial infrastructure originally envisioned by the Singaporean planners.

== History ==
The Suzhou Industrial Park was the result of high-level intergovernmental cooperation between China and Singapore, designed to blend Singaporean planning expertise with China's development needs. In the late 1980s, Singapore began adjusting its export-oriented strategy and saw investment in China as a natural extension of its regional engagement. Under the Regional Industrial Parks initiative, Singapore proposed to develop industrial estates abroad, following the model of its own Jurong Industrial Estate. Encouraged by Deng Xiaoping's 1992 southern tour and his remark that Singapore was well managed and worth learning from, Singapore viewed the opportunity as one of long-term strategic partnership. Deng admired how Singapore, under the People's Action Party (PAP), had achieved rapid economic growth while ensuring political stability and public order, qualities he hoped China could emulate.

In 1993, Singaporean Senior Minister Lee Kuan Yew contacted Vice Premier Zhu Rongji to propose a government-to-government joint venture to develop an industrial estate in Suzhou. After negotiations and surveys, both sides agreed to develop a modern industrial park in eastern Suzhou. Suzhou was chosen for its skilled workforce and proximity to Shanghai.

The China–Singapore Suzhou Industrial Park (CS-SIP) was formally launched on 26 February 1994 when Chinese Vice Premier Li Lanqing and Singapore's Lee signed the Agreement on the Joint Development of Suzhou Industrial Park. The CS-SIP company was 65% owned by a consortium of Singaporean state-owned enterprises and 35% owned by a consortium of Chinese state-owned enterprises, and the first chairman was Lim Chee Onn. China established the Suzhou Industrial Park Administrative Committee to be the local government agency for the SIP and made the SIP a special economic zone.

=== Initial disagreements and troubles ===
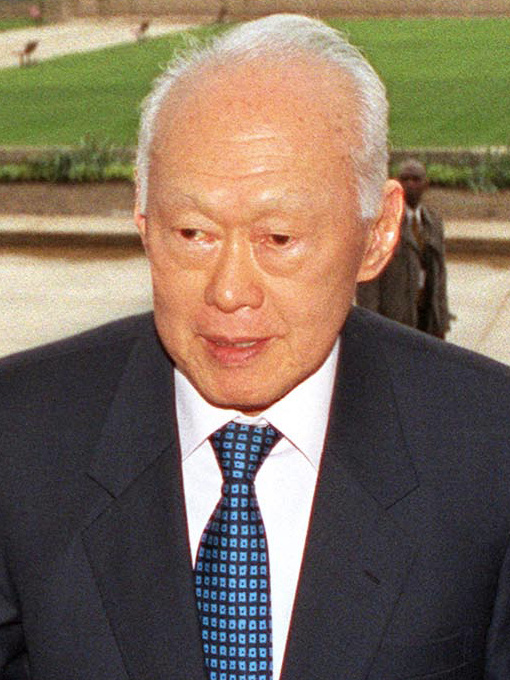
Singapore's Lee Kuan Yew acknowledged that the project fell short of expectations, highlighting challenges in navigating a decentralised bureaucracy and accusing local Chinese officials of leveraging Singapore's reputation to draw foreign investors, only to redirect them to more affordable local areas.

The SIP attracted significant foreign direct investment in its first few years, including US$1.42 billion in its first year.

Early in its development, the SIP imposed relatively high rental rates in an effort to recover the substantial costs of its newly built infrastructure. This strategy drew concern from observers who noted that the SIP was intended to offer a cost advantage over nearby cities such as Shanghai, yet it was charging comparable prices. Compounding the challenges, the Suzhou Municipal Government began heavily promoting the rival Suzhou New District (SND), in which it had a larger stake. Many sources saw the SND as a direct competitor to the SIP.

Singaporean officials raised concerns in 1997 over the visible imbalance in local promotion, citing that citywide advertising favoured the SND over the SIP. Efforts were made by Singapore to negotiate a halt to the SND's publicity for five years, but this was declined by the Suzhou government. Lee warned that Singapore might withdraw from the project if conditions did not improve. In 1999, Singapore reduced its stake in the SIP from a majority share to 35 percent, hoping this would align the local authorities' incentives with the park's success. Most Singaporean civil servants were recalled, with only three remaining on the ground and key infrastructure assets such as power and water treatment plants were sold to Chinese partners. The planned development area was significantly reduced from 70 square kilometres (27 mi^{2}) to 8 square kilometres (3.1 mi^{2}), reflecting a scaled-down commitment from Singapore.

By the late 1990s, reports painted a difficult picture for the SIP. According to Singaporean sources cited by The New York Times, the project had accumulated average annual losses of 23.5 million United States dollars, with a total investment of 147 million dollars by 1999. Projected losses were expected to reach 90 million dollars by the end of 2000. Chinese counterparts, however, disputed these figures and claimed the park was on track to generate a 72 million dollar profit. The New York Times observed that the project, intended to demonstrate Singapore's governance model and efficiency to Chinese administrators, instead revealed the complexities of operating in a system where local officials often disregarded central directives. Reflecting on the experience, Lee stated that the project had not met expectations, citing difficulties in dealing with a decentralised bureaucracy and accusing local Chinese officials of using Singapore's reputation to attract foreign investors before diverting them to cheaper local zones.

=== Early turnaround ===
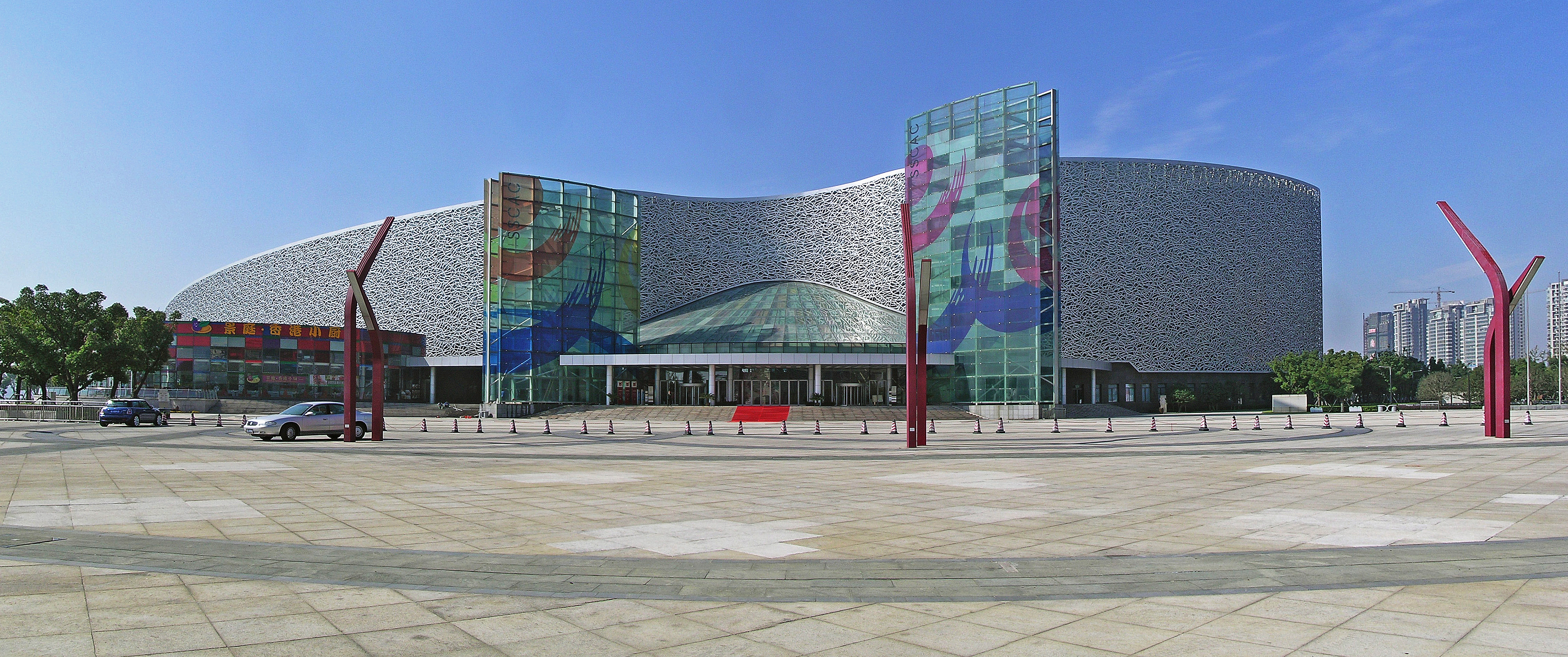
Suzhou Culture and Arts Centre

In response to Singapore's public complaints and partial pullout, the industrial park received new management, with Wang Jinhua, the former manager of the Suzhou New District, and former vice-mayor of Suzhou, leading the park. Under Wang, the industrial park lowered rents, which has been credited by the Far Eastern Economic Review with attracting more investors, and helping the Suzhou Industrial Park compete with other regional industrial parks. In the first ten months of 2001, two years after Singapore lowered its stake, the park made its first profit of $3.8 million. Since assuming a majority stake in the project, Suzhou's city government begun subsidizing the joint-venture development company for shortfalls it suffers if land does not sell, and is offering other financial support, including paying up to three years' rent for some projects. That year, Singapore's top official remaining in the project, Goh Toh Sim, called the previous public disagreement "water under the bridge", and estimated that the SIP would make a profit of $7.5 million by the end of 2001, and be listed on the stock market by 2004.

However, much of the industrial park's early success was derived from its highly desirable real estate. In projecting the project's first profit in 2001, Goh also admitted that most of this profit would come from the sale of residential land, as opposed to industrial land. The scenic lakes in the park, the presence of an international school, and pension schemes by companies in the park which helped with apartment purchases all helped make the residential land in the park highly desirable. From 1998 to 2001, apartment prices in the industrial park rose by more than 50%.

While the industrial side of the project struggled to turn a profit, a number of major companies, such as Nokia, Alcatel and Philips, set up shop in the park, attracted by its large labor pool of workers who had experience in other electronics companies nearby. Semiconductor producers, including Samsung, and Hitachi, also organized production in the park, and the government began implementing further incentives to develop the area's semiconductor industry. One manager interviewed in an article for the Far Eastern Economic Review also noted that, since assuming a majority stake in the project, local authorities began improving their governance of the project, and provided political support for companies involved in the park. In 2001, Newsweek stated that the Suzhou Industrial Park had a significant role in Suzhou's development as a high-tech city.

By 2003, the SIP had recovered its previous deficits. Its economic achievements resulted in the concept of the "Suzhou Model," which developed in the early 2000s and influenced urban development elsewhere in China.

=== Later successes ===
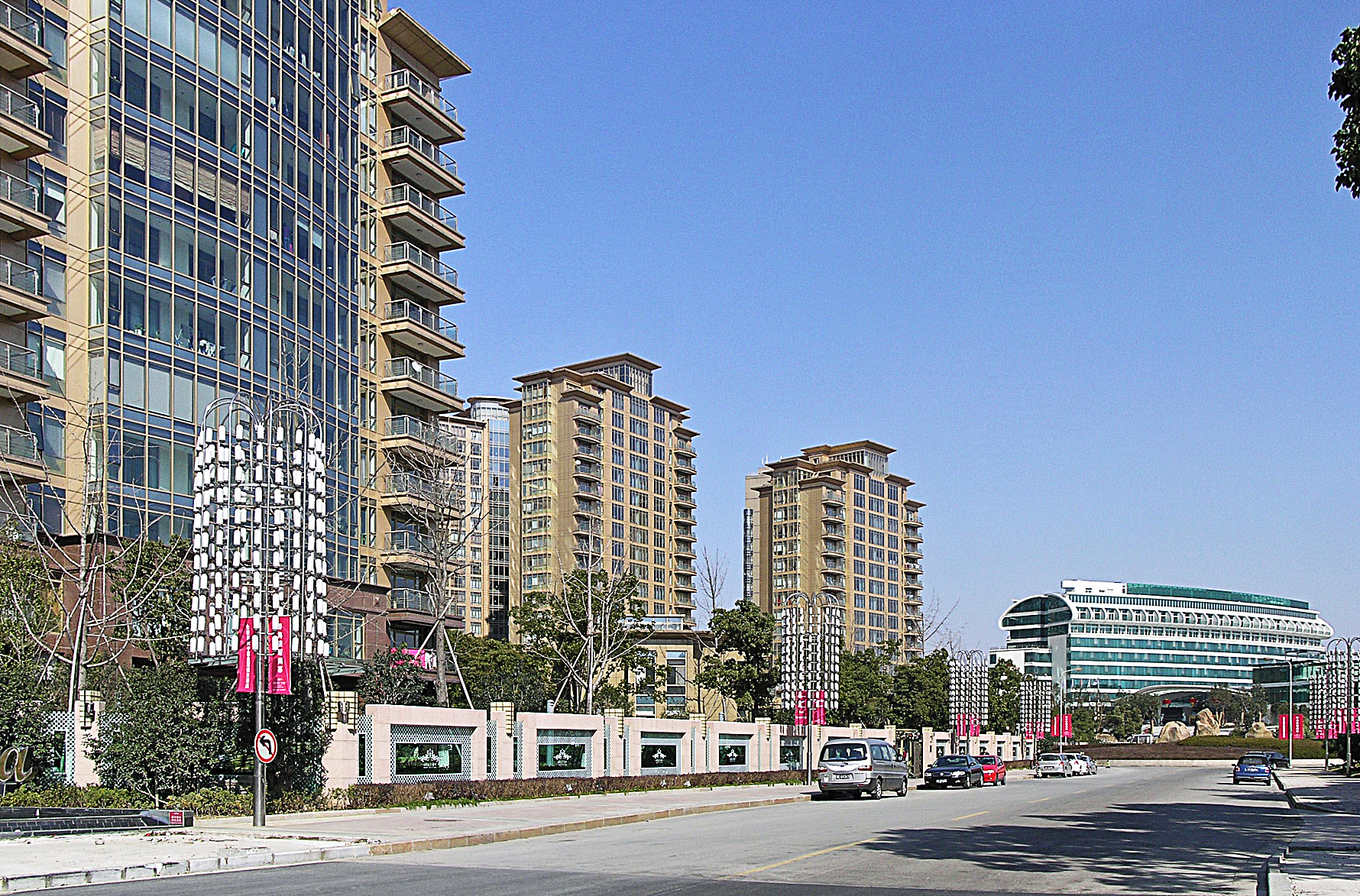
Crown Plaza Suzhou

Despite attracting significant media attention early on for its high-profile setbacks, the project has since been viewed as a success by many. The Straits Times noted in a 2014 article that despite only comprising 3.4% of Suzhou's land area and 5.2% of its population, it contributed 15% of the city's economy. By 2014, some 25,000 companies were doing business in the industrial park, including 91 Fortune 500 companies. As of 2019, the industrial park has contributed about 119.11 billion dollars in tax revenue since its inception, and has achieved more than $1 trillion in foreign trade volume.

Real estate values in the Suzhou Industrial Park continued to rise greatly after its early years. In the first half of 2019 alone, the price of real estate rose 8.6% to 5,270 dollars per square meter. While real estate prices throughout Suzhou surged during this period, the South China Morning Post noted that real estate in the industrial park proved to be especially desirable thanks to the high-quality school systems and jobs in the area, resulting in the park having the most expensive residential properties in the entire city.

In August 2013, China News Service cited the Lianhe Zaobao as reporting that the governments of North Korea and South Korea have modelled the Kaesong Industrial Region upon the Suzhou Industrial Park. In August 2018, Xinhua reported that the China-Belarus Industrial Park was developed using the Suzhou Industrial Park as a model.

As of 2024, it is one of China's largest and most successful industrial parks. Writing in 2025, academic Zhongjie Lin states that in addition to its economic successes, Suzhou Industrial Park's urban landscape is one of the best in China and also contributed to Suzhou's preservation of its cultural heritage.

The success of Suzhou Industrial Park has led to further attempts in China to replicate and build on its urban development model, including through the Sino-Singapore Tianjin Eco-City.

== Geography ==
The Suzhou Industrial Park has an area of 278 square kilometres (107 mi^{2}), of which, the China-Singapore cooperation area covers 80 square kilometres (31 mi^{2}).

Jinji Lake (simplified Chinese: 金鸡湖; traditional Chinese: 金雞湖; pinyin: Jīnjī Hú; lit. 'golden rooster lake') is a small fresh water lake located in the central part of Suzhou Industrial Park. It occupies an area of 7.4 square kilometres (2.9 mi^{2}). Originally a marshy and shallow pond, it was redeveloped into one of China's largest lakefront parks. It is part of the core of the new city.

Dushu Lake is a small fresh water lake located in the southern part of the Suzhou Industrial Park, with an area of about 9.48 square kilometres (3.66 mi^{2}). Yangcheng Lake is also located in the northern part of the industrial park. The Luo River and Suzhou Creek both flow through the industrial park from west to east.

== Governance ==
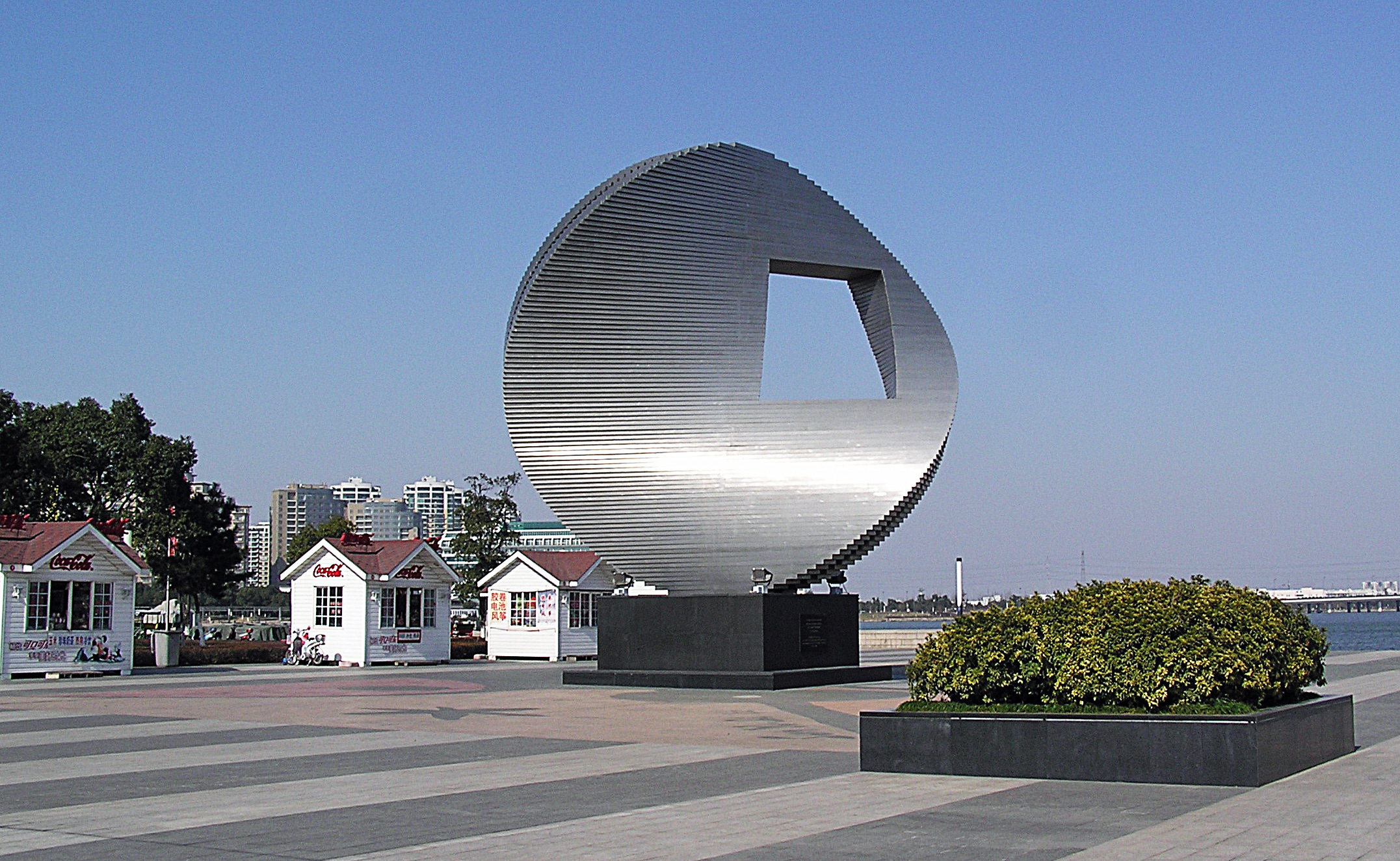
The art sculpture of Harmony, one of the icons in Suzhou Industrial Park

A group known as the China–Singapore Joint Steering Council (simplified Chinese: 中新苏州工业园区联合协调理事会; traditional Chinese: 中新蘇州工業園區聯合協調理事會; pinyin: Zhōng Xīn Sūzhōu Gōngyèyuánqū Liánhé Xiétiáo Lǐshìhuì), comprising both Chinese and Singaporean officials and government bureaus, is tasked with the development of the industrial park. As of 2019, Han Zheng, the Vice Premier of China, serves as the head of the Chinese half of the Joint Steering Council, and Heng Swee Keat, the Deputy Prime Minister of Singapore, serves as the head of the Singaporean half.

=== Administrative divisions ===
The Suzhou Industrial Park administers four subdistricts (Chinese: 街道; pinyin: Jiēdào) and four residential communities (simplified Chinese: 社区; traditional Chinese: 社區; pinyin: Shèqū).

The park's four subdistricts are Loufeng Subdistrict, Xietang Subdistrict, Weiting Subdistrict, and Shengpu Subdistrict.

The park's four residential communities are Huxi Community (Chinese: 湖西社区), Hudong Community (Chinese: 湖东社区), Yueliangwan Community (Chinese: 月亮湾社区), and Dongshahu Community (Chinese: 东沙湖社区).

=== Project management ===
Many companies participate in the development of Suzhou Industrial Park, with state-owned enterprises Zhaorun Group and Zhongxin Group having the lead roles. Zhaorun Group is a local government financing vehicle owned entirely by the local government. It is responsible for primary land development and infrastructure building. Zhongxin Group handles secondary land development, attracting investment and companies to the park, and daily operations.

== Economy ==
In 2019, the GDP from economic activities in Suzhou Industrial Park was 274 billion RMB (an amount larger than many prefecture-level cities), generating 37 billion in tax revenue.

The Suzhou Industrial Park aims to attract high-tech industries, especially software-focused information technology and biotechnology industries. Companies with operations in the industrial park include Samsung, UPS, AI Speech, Robotime Technology, Bosch, Siemens, and Johnson & Johnson.

Oriza Holdings acts as the investment arm of the Suzhou Industrial Park.

Reports surfaced in 2019 that the park was being affected by the US-China trade war, with exports having declined 10 per cent over the first seven months of 2019 when compared to 2018 figures, while imports have fallen 15 per cent over the same period.

== Education ==
Since its early days, Suzhou Industrial Park has attracted many residents due to its exceptional school system, and the industrial park has the most schools of all of Suzhou's county-level divisions. As of March 2021, the district has 81 kindergartens, 15 primary schools, 3 junior high schools, 18 nine-year schools, 3 regular secondary schools, 1 combined junior and senior secondary school, 2 fifteen-year schools, 2 special education schools, 2 schools for children of foreigners, 1 open university for elderly people, 1 youth activity center, and 1 city-wide secondary school.

=== Universities and higher education ===
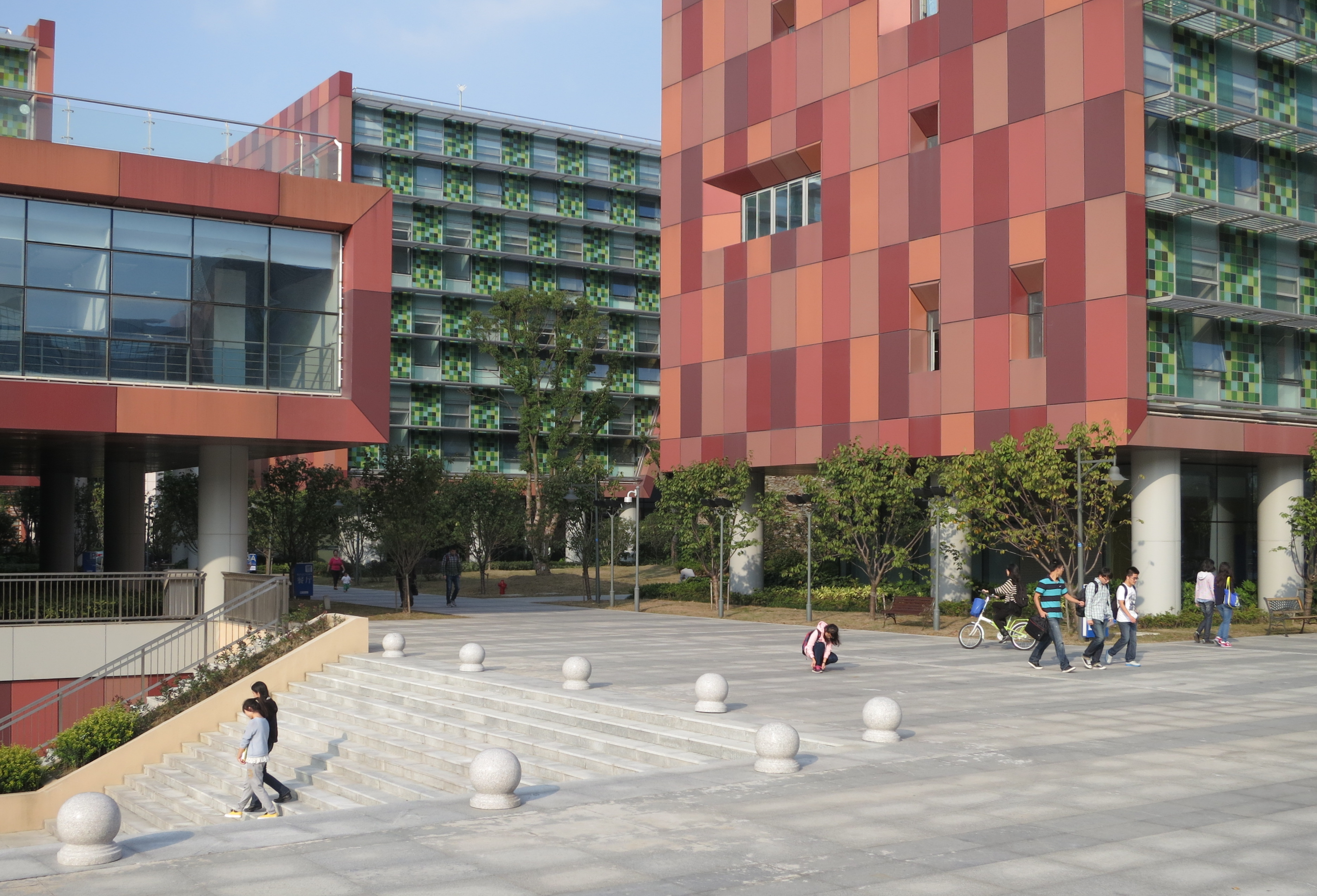
North Campus, Xi’an Jiaotong-Liverpool University, architects: Perkins+Will

Suzhou Dushu Lake Higher Education Town, one of the government's key projects, is located in the industrial park. Major universities in the park include Suzhou University, Xi'an Jiaotong-Liverpool University and Renmin University of China, Suzhou Campus.

=== International schools ===
Dulwich International High School Suzhou (DHSZ) and Dulwich College (DCSZ) are two of the international schools located in the east of SIP. These two schools have a British curriculum, with DHSZ catering mainly to Chinese students, teaching IGCSE and A Level, whereas its neighbour, DCSZ, teaches IGCSE and IB and caters to foreign passport holders.

The Suzhou Singapore International School is located in the Suzhou Industrial Park.

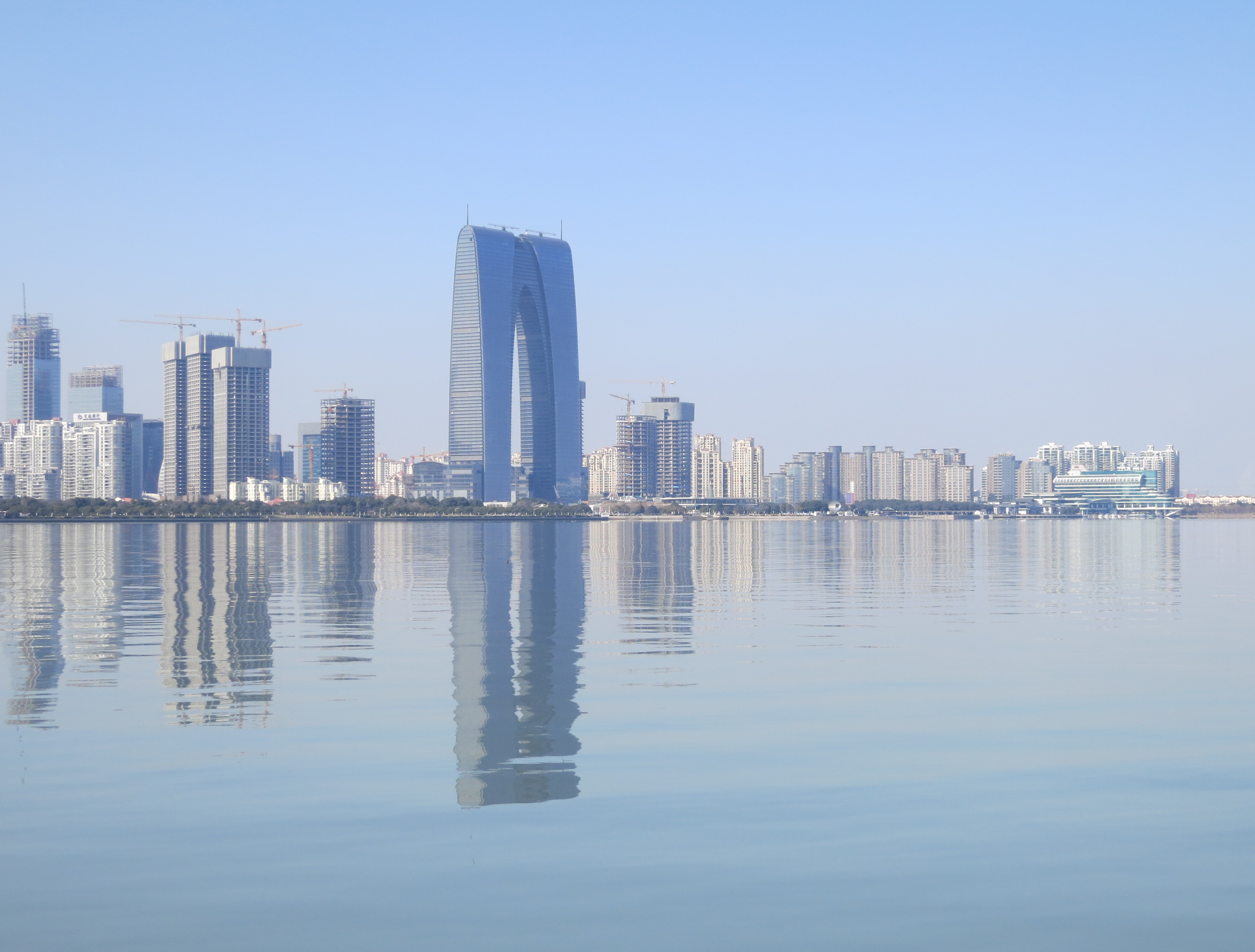
The Gate of the Orient on the bank of Jinji Lake at Suzhou Industrial Park

=== Other schools ===
- Suzhou Industrial Park No. 5 Middle School

== Transportation ==
The G2 Beijing-Shanghai Expressway runs through the Suzhou Industrial Park along a west–east axis. The eastern portion of Suzhou's Intermediate Ring Road (simplified Chinese: 中环路; traditional Chinese: 中環路; pinyin: Zhōng Huán Lù) also passes through the industrial park.

Two high-speed railways serve the industrial park: the Beijing-Shanghai high-speed railway and the Shanghai-Nanjing high-speed railway.

== See also ==
- Dushu Lake
- Gate to the East
- Jinji Lake
- Suzhou Ferris Wheel
- Suzhou Industrial Park railway station
- Suzhou New District
- Yangcheng Lake
