= Dushu Lake =

Fresh water lake in Suzhou, China

- 独墅湖 (Chinese)
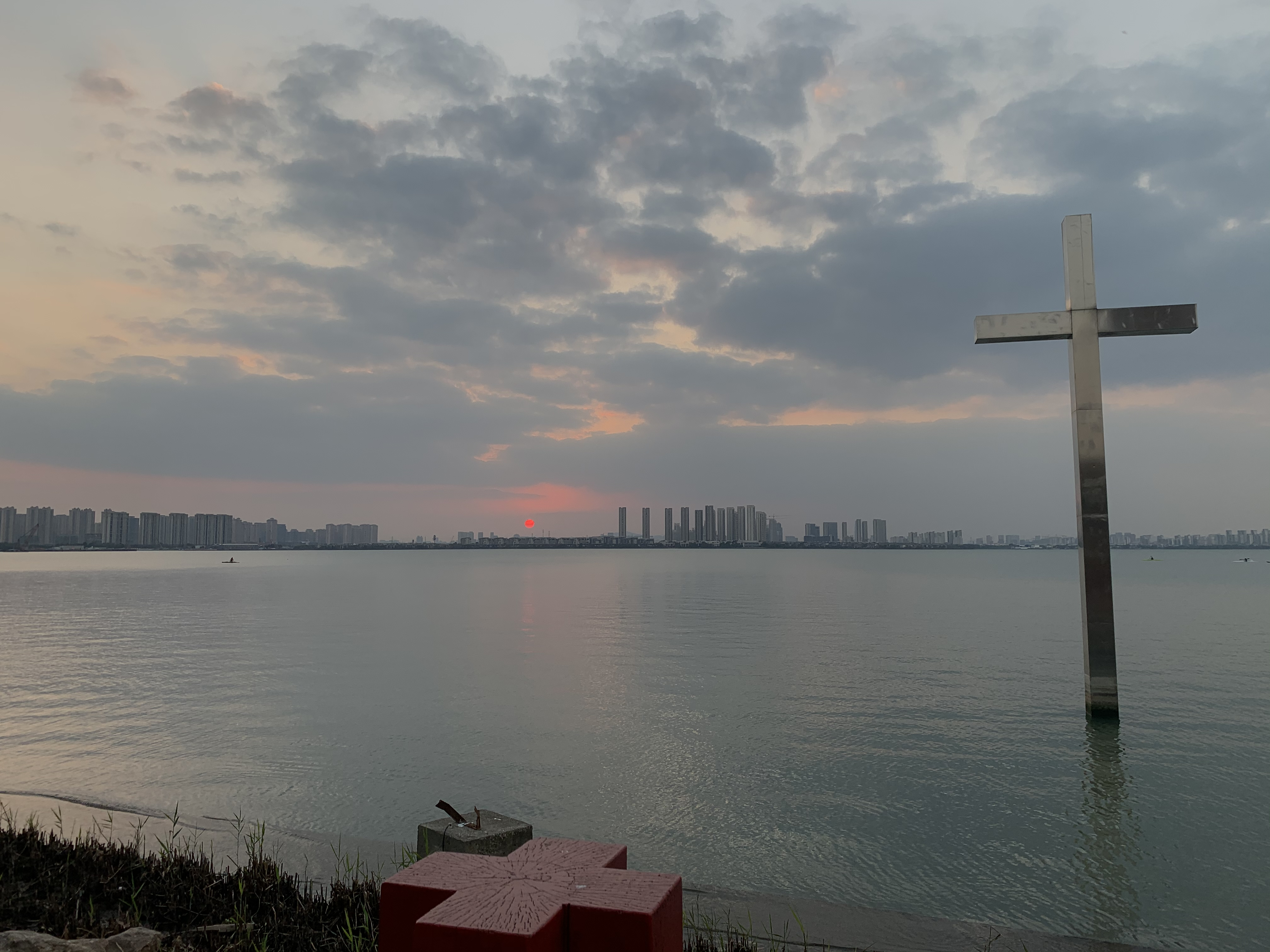
- Dushu Lake

- Location within Jiangsu
- Location: Suzhou, Jiangsu
- Coordinates: 31.273°N 120.700°E
- Lake type: Freshwater Lake
- Basin countries: China
- Max. length: 18.07 km (11.23 mi)
- Surface area: 9.19 km^{2} (3.55 sq mi)
- Average depth: 6.5 m (21 ft)
- Max. depth: 8 m (26 ft)
- Water volume: 620,000,000 m^{3} (2.2×10^{10} cu ft)
- Settlements: Suzhou, Jiangsu

Dushu Lake (Chinese: 独墅湖) is a freshwater lake in the southern part of Suzhou Industrial Park. It is located in the junction of four towns: Guoxiang (郭巷), Chefang (车坊), Xietang (斜塘) and Loufeng (娄葑). The area of Dushu Lake is 9.19 square kilometers with an average depth of 6.5 meters. The lake connects the Jinji Lake (金鸡湖) at its north end, the Fengmen Pond (葑门塘) at its west, and is fed by the Wusong River (吴淞江) from the south-east. The earliest proof of possible human activity around Dushu Lake can be traced back 5500 years, according to an archaeology report conducted in 2001. The findings were significant in analyzing Suzhou's climate, geography, and environment in ancient times. Suzhou Dushu Lake Higher Education Town is located by the east bank of the lake, and two tunnels run through the lake, connecting the east and west bank.

== History ==
In 2001, archaeologists from the Suzhou Cultural Relics Committee (苏州市文物管理委员会) and the Suzhou Museum (苏州博物馆) found more than 1000 (1379 in total) wells from ancient times underneath Dushu Lake, further verifying historical records that indicate human activity from the Neolithic era to the Northern Song dynasty around the area. Evidence of wells were first found accidentally by workers digging under the lake. The findings proved human activity in the Fanxietang Area (泛斜塘地区) 5500 years ago. The two-month archaeology study also found and repaired 155 pieces of cultural relics which were collected and stored by the Suzhou Cultural Relics Committee and the Suzhou Museum under the instruction of the Suzhou government.

== Geography ==
Dushu Lake is connected to Jinji Lake from the north, Fengmen Pond from the west and Wusong River from the south-east. The lakebed is generally flat, and is relatively harder on the east side where the depth of water is shallower. The water gets deeper in the northern part with a softer lakebed. The maximum depth of Dushu Lake is 8 metres (26 ft), with an average of 6.5 metres (21 ft). The total water volume of the lake is 620,000,000 cubic metres (2.2×10^{10} cu ft). The average water level is 2.9 metres (9 ft 6 in) from 1993 to 2005. The maximum length of Dushu Lake is 18.07 kilometres (11.23 mi), separated by Wuzhong District (5.88 km [3.65 mi]) and Suzhou Industrial Park (12.19 km [7.57 mi]).

== Transportation ==
=== Dushu Lake Tunnel (独墅湖隧道) ===
Construction began in May 2006 and has been open to traffic since October 2007. The Dushu Lake Tunnel is the first and longest project that connects the city bridge to the underwater tunnel in mainland China. Dushu Lake Tunnel connects East-South-Ring Highway Interchange and Xinghu Street in Suzhou Industrial Park with a full-length of 7.37 km (4.58 mi). This connection enables future transportation and also encourages growth throughout Suzhou Industrial Park.

=== The Second Dushu Lake Tunnel (独墅湖第二通道) ===
Aiming to ease the traffic flow in Dushu Lake Tunnel, the Second Dushu Lake Tunnel was estimated to be open to traffic by the end of 2021. Connecting Wuzhong District (吴中区) and Suzhou Industrial Park, The Second Dushu Lake Tunnel has a full-length of 3.93 km (2.44 mi), and is a dual-direction underwater tunnel. The tunnel could shorten the commuting time from Suzhou Dushu Lake Higher Education Town to Guoxiang (郭巷) from 30 minutes to 5 minutes. By the end of August 2021, the progress of the tunnel's main body was 87% and the bridge pier was 70% completed.

== Tourist Attractions ==
=== Dushu Lake Christian Church ===
Ten thousand Christians reside in Suzhou Industrial Park, half of whom are non-Chinese. Correspondingly, Dushu Lake Christian Church opened in May 2010 and was the first bilingual church in mainland China. The church takes 5,600 square meters to hold 2,100 people.

=== Egret Park (白鹭园) ===
Egret Park is located by the east bank of Dushu Lake. It was named Egret Park because many egrets reside in the area. The park has 180,000 square meters and 76.5% of the site is covered by landscape greenery.

=== Dongwu Temple (东吴寺) ===
Dongwu Temple is located on Xinghu Road in the southwest part of Dushu Lake. It was built between the end of the Yuan dynasty and the beginning of the Ming dynasty. It was destroyed during the Second Sino-Japanese War and was later rebuilt.

== Gallery ==
Dushu Lake Gallery

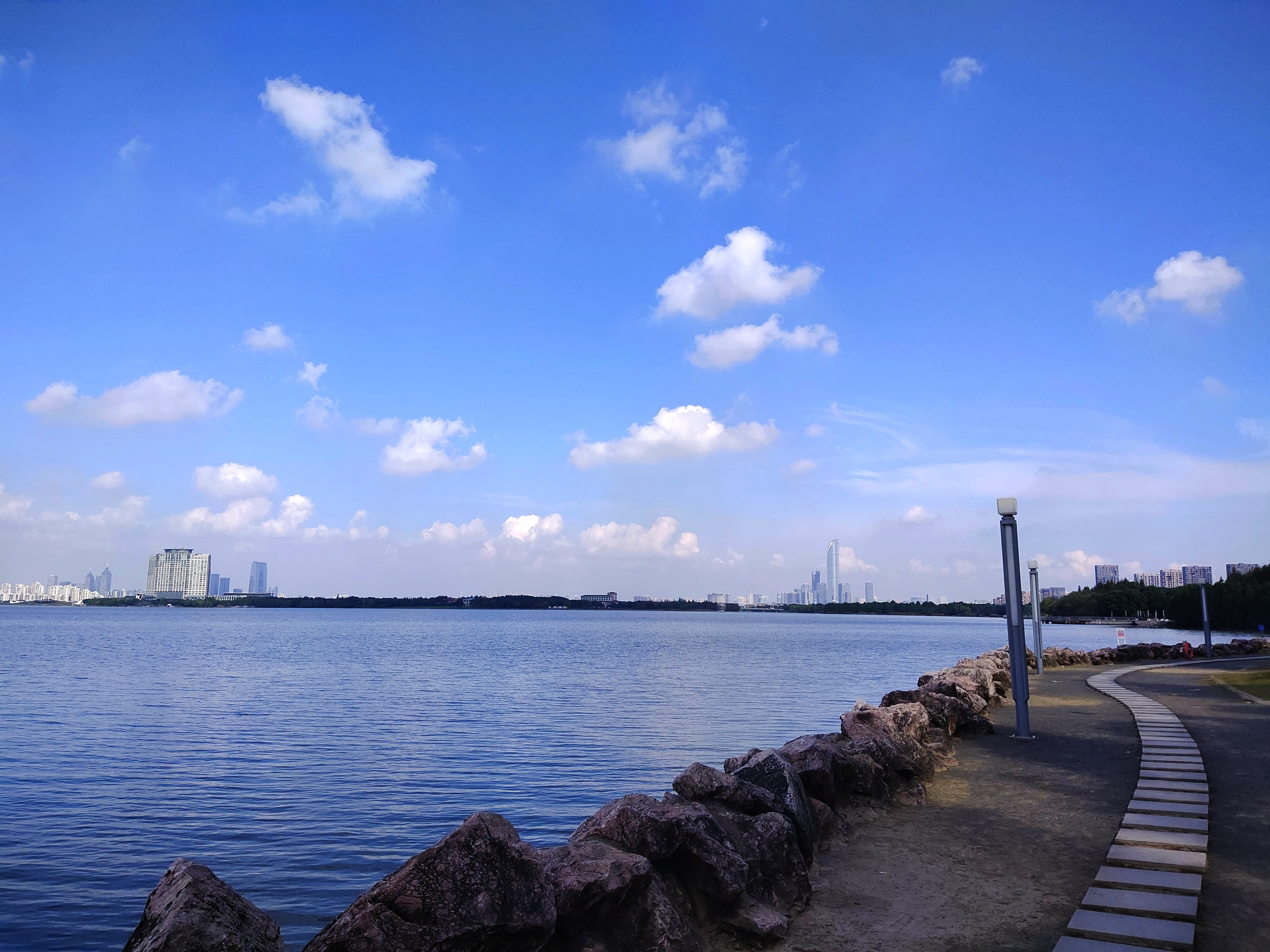
Dushu Lake (Daytime)

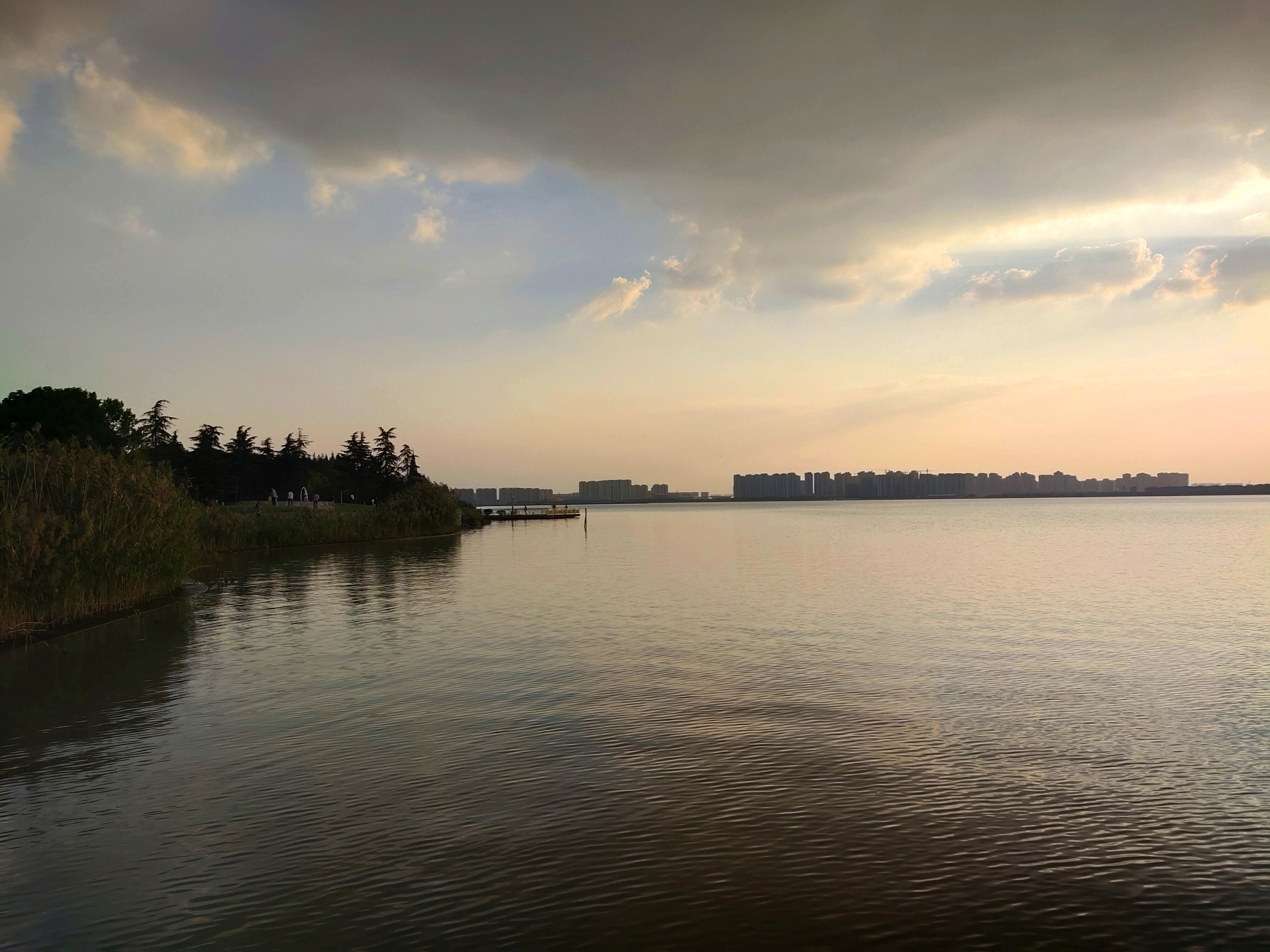
Dushu Lake

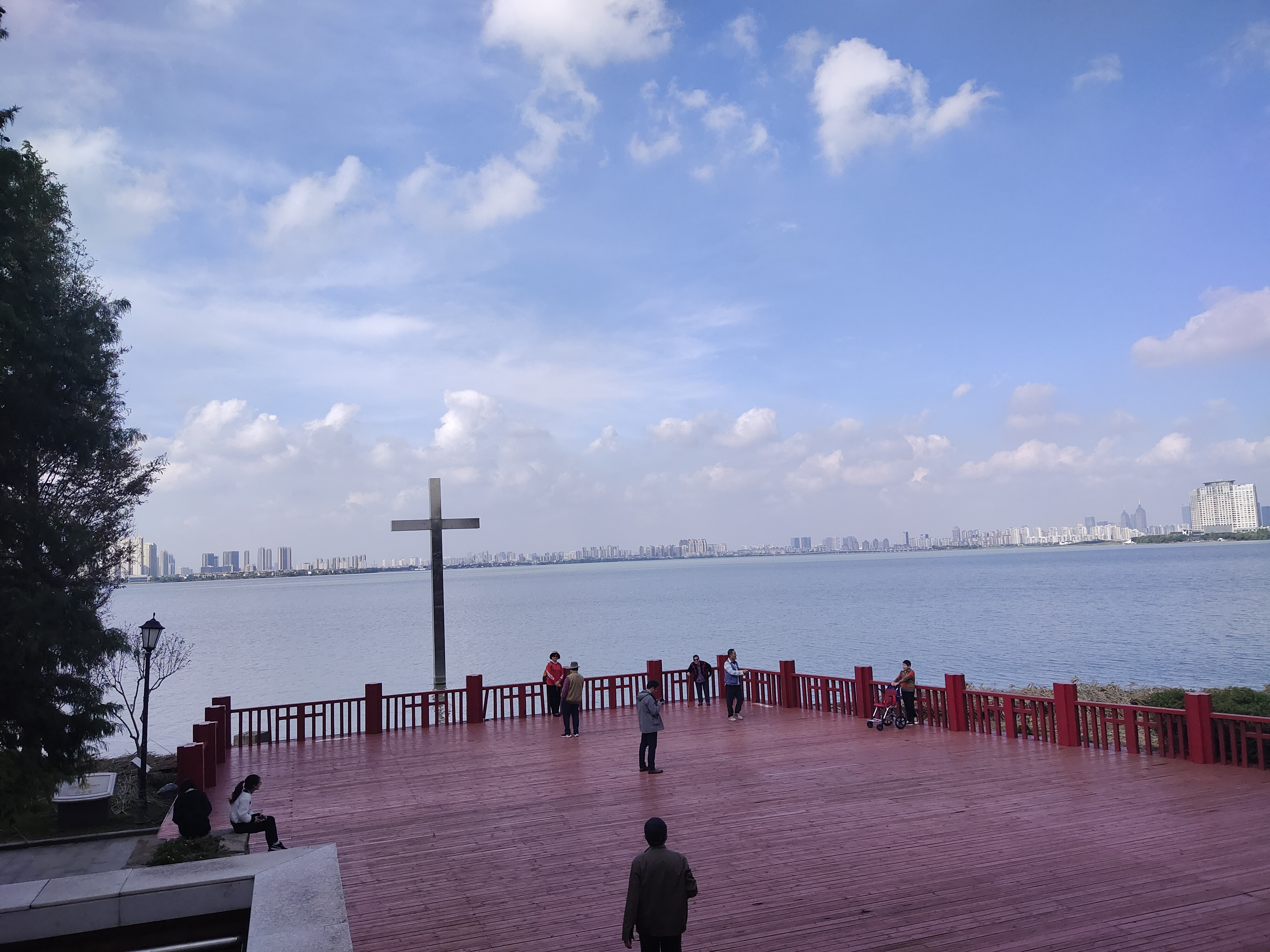
Dushu Lake Christian Church

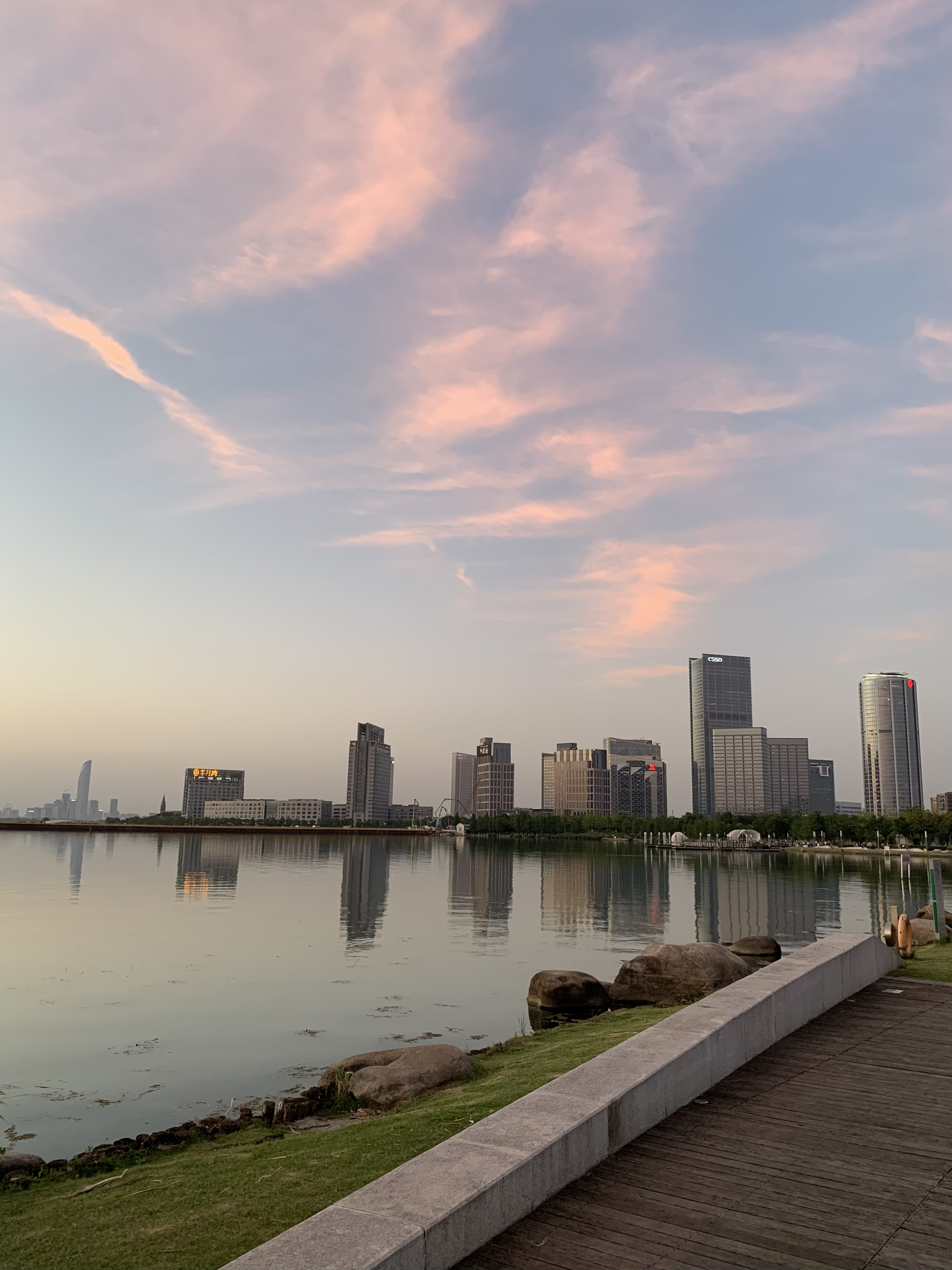
Dushu Lake Sunset

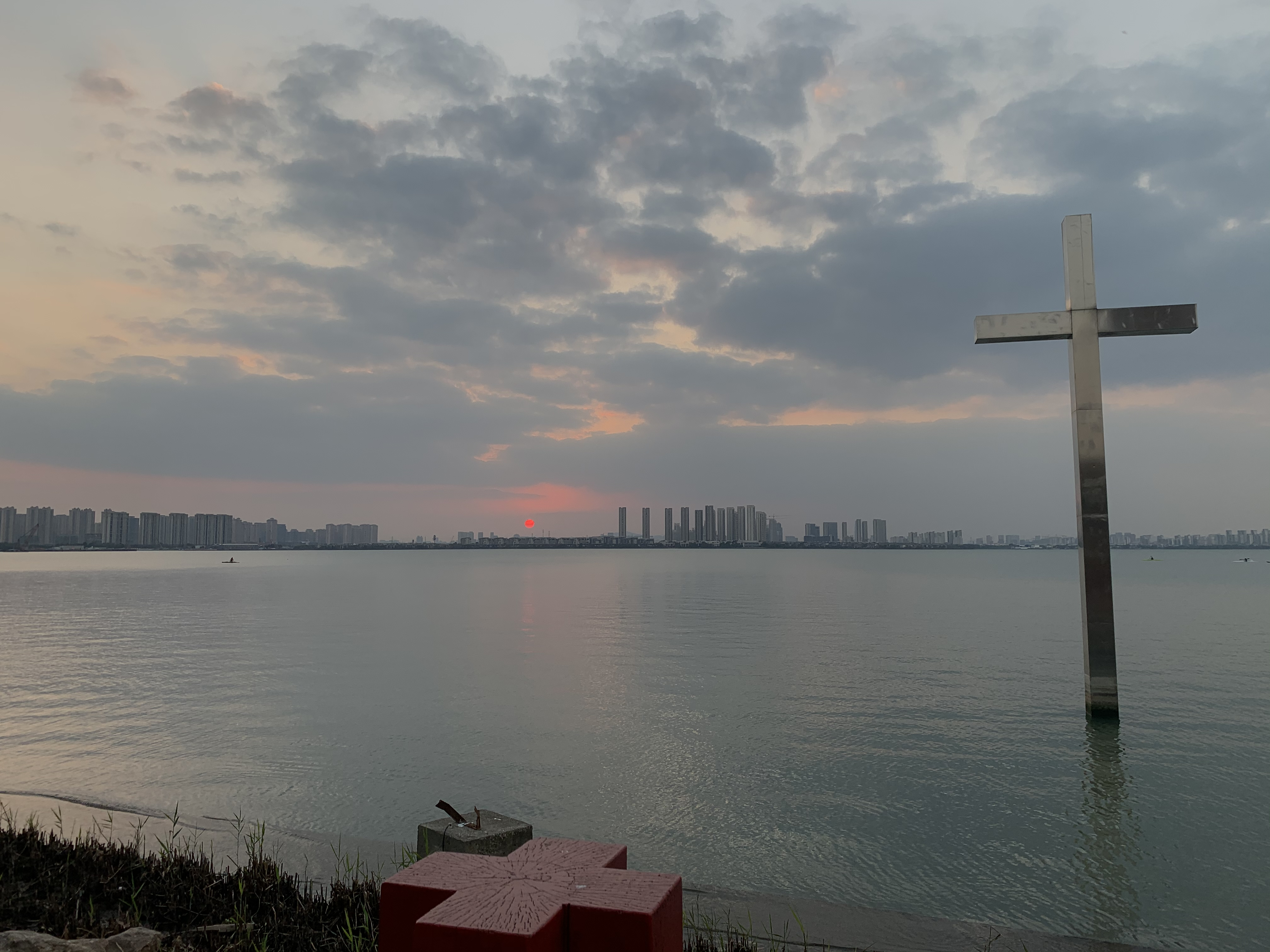
Dushu Lake Christian Church Sunset

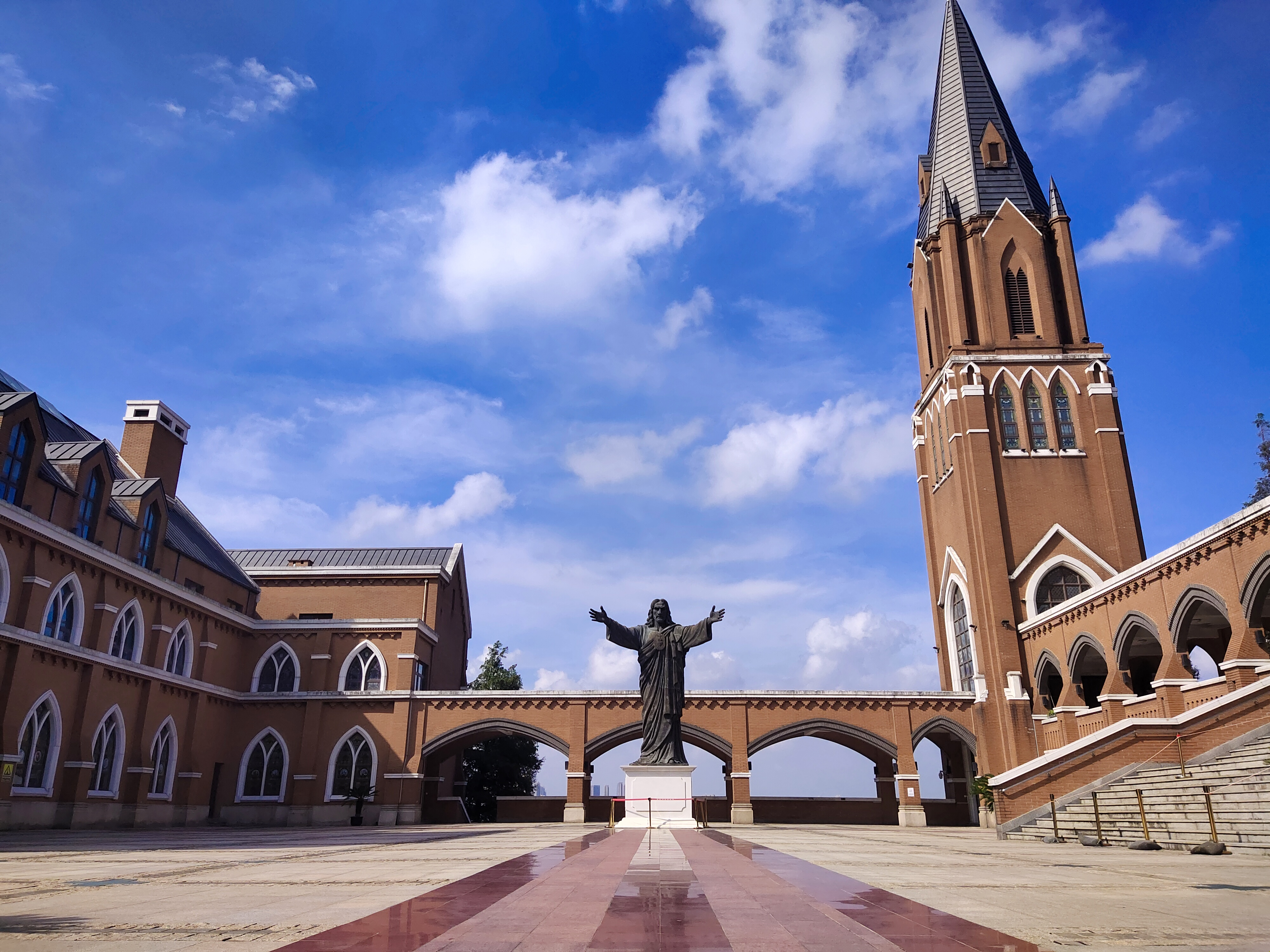
Dushu Lake Christian Church (Square)

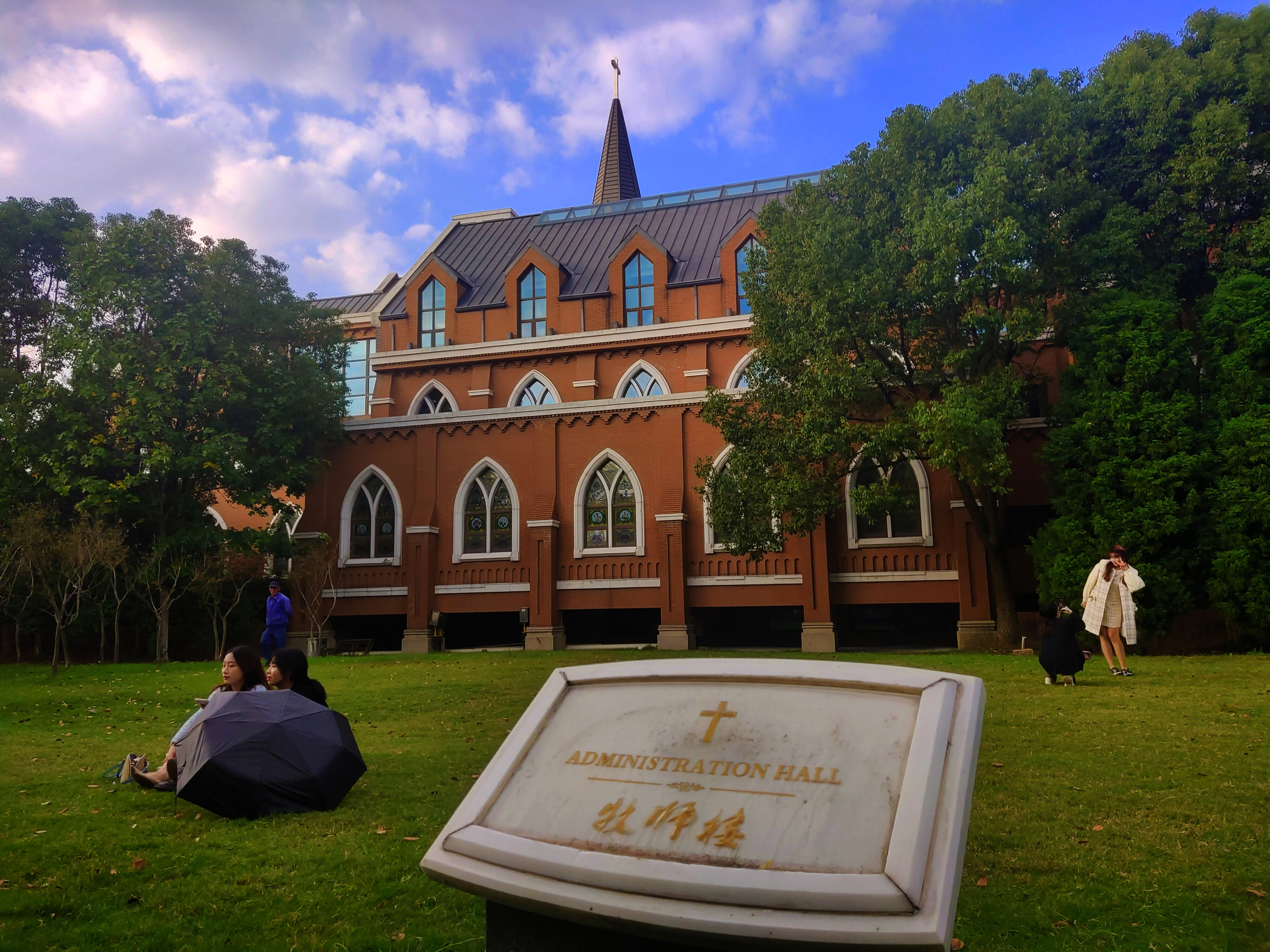
Dushu Lake Christian Church

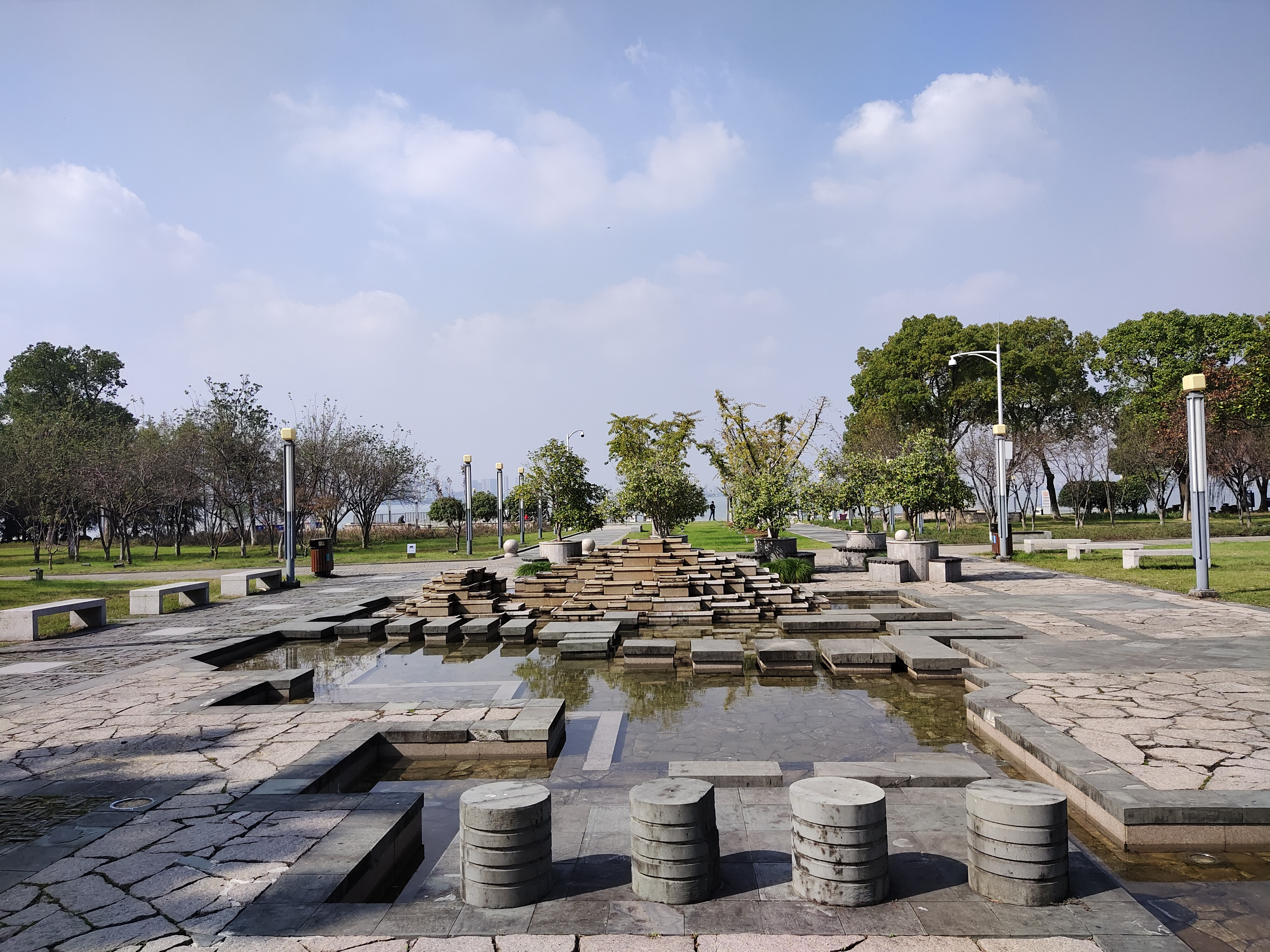
Egret Park

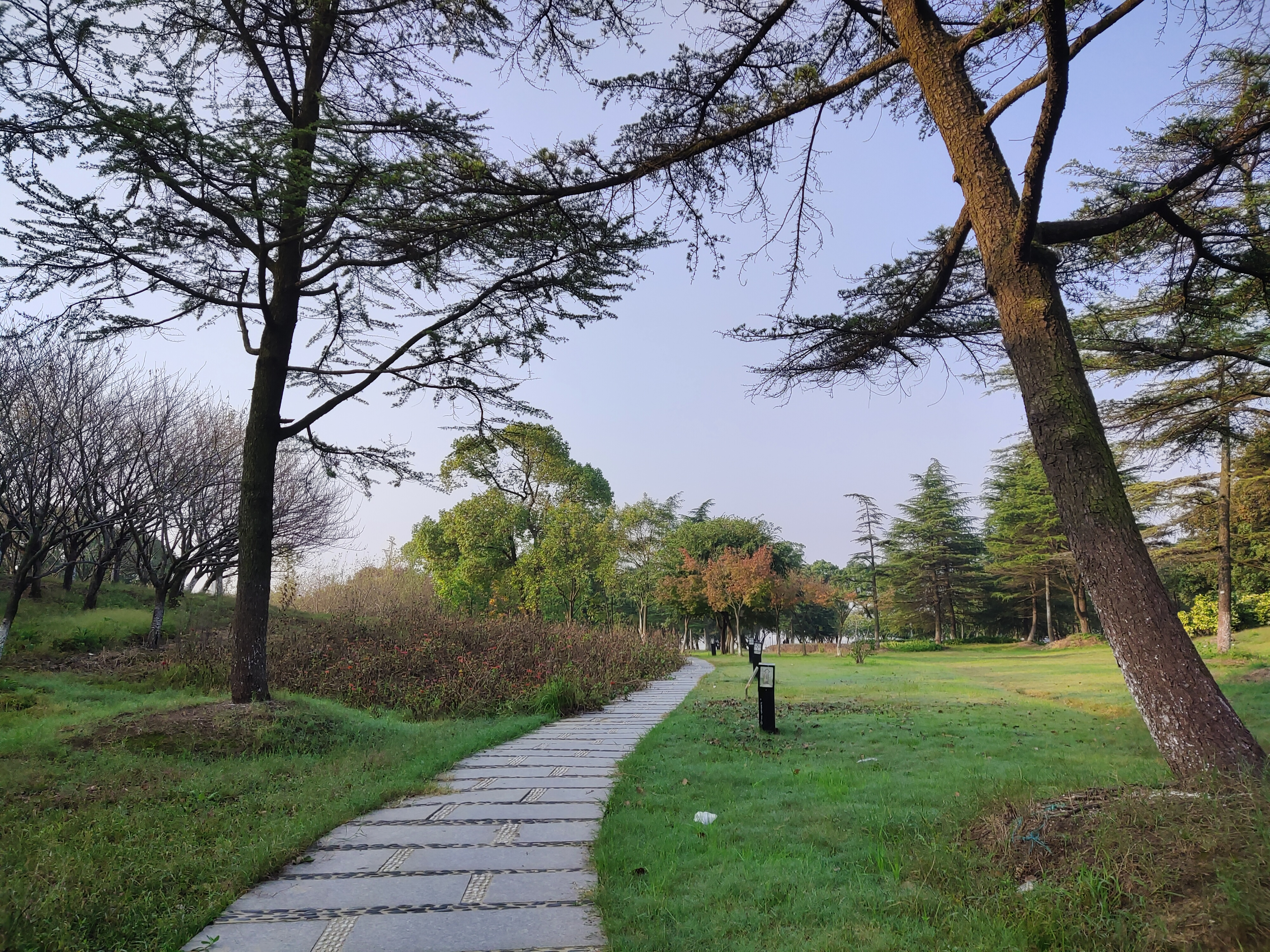
Egret Park
