= Xi'an Jiaotong–Liverpool University =

Chinese-foreign cooperative university in Suzhou, China

- 西交利物浦大学
- Other name: XJTLU
- Motto: Aethera ac lucem petimus 博学明道，笃行任事
- Motto in English: Light and Wings
- Type: Sino-foreign cooperative university
- Established: 22 May 2006; 20 years ago
- Founders: Xi'an Jiaotong University and the University of Liverpool
- Academic affiliations: University Alliance of the Silk Road
- Chairman: Zhiwei Shan
- President: Wenquan Tao
- Location: Suzhou, Jiangsu, 215123, China; 31.2748°N 120.73807°E
- Campuses: Suzhou Industrial Park campus; Taicang campus
- Colours: Dark blue and magenta
- Website: xjtlu.edu.cn
- Campuses in Suzhou and Taicang

Xi'an Jiaotong–Liverpool University (XJTLU; Chinese: 西交利物浦大学; pinyin: Xījiāo Lìwùpǔ Dàxué) is a Sino-foreign cooperative university in Suzhou, Jiangsu, China. It was established in 2006 through a partnership between Xi'an Jiaotong University and the University of Liverpool, and was approved by the Ministry of Education of the People's Republic of China. XJTLU is officially affiliated to both Xi'an Jiaotong University and the University of Liverpool.

Undergraduate students normally receive two degrees: one from XJTLU, recognised by China's Ministry of Education, and one from the University of Liverpool. Postgraduate students receive a University of Liverpool degree.

== History ==
In September 2004, Xi'an Jiaotong University and the University of Liverpool jointly agreed to establish a new institution of higher education in Suzhou. XJTLU was approved by the Ministry of Education of the People's Republic of China and opened on 22 May 2006, with 164 students in its first cohort.

== Institution ==
XJTLU is affiliated to both Xi'an Jiaotong University and the University of Liverpool through its founding partnership. The university is also a member of the University Alliance of the Silk Road.

The partnership allows undergraduate students to receive both an XJTLU degree and a University of Liverpool degree in most cases. It also provides a route for some students to transfer to Liverpool during their studies, commonly referred to by the universities as the "2+2" route.

As of 2026, XJTLU's chair of the board of directors was Zhiwei Shan, its president was Wenquan Tao, and its executive president was Youmin Xi.

=== Accreditations ===
XJTLU's architecture programmes are validated by the Royal Institute of British Architects (RIBA) at Part 1 and Part 2 levels. Its MBA programme is accredited by the Association to Advance Collegiate Schools of Business (AACSB) and the Association of MBAs (AMBA).

== Campus ==
XJTLU is primarily based in Suzhou Industrial Park, with an additional campus, XJTLU Entrepreneur College, in Taicang. As of 2026, the university reported around 26,000 students and more than 2,400 staff. XJTLU expanded outside its main campus in Suzhou Industrial Park. XJTLU Entrepreneur College in Taicang admitted its first students in 2019 and the Taicang campus opened in September 2022.

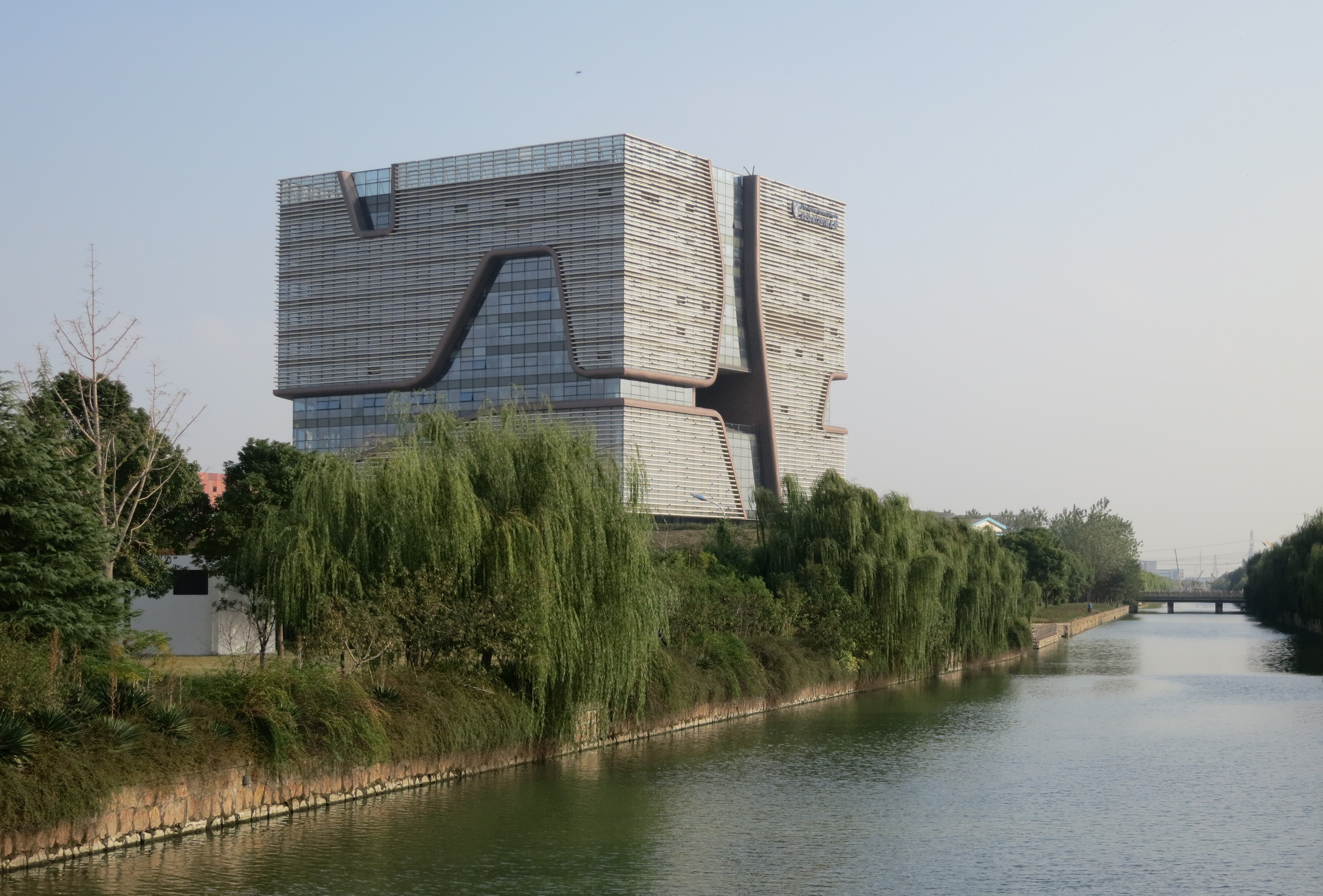
Central Building/Administration and Information Centre, as viewed from Dushu Lake (独墅湖)

=== Suzhou Industrial Park campus ===
XJTLU's main campus is located at 111 Ren'ai Road in Suzhou Industrial Park, within the Dushu Lake Science and Education Innovation District of Suzhou.

The Suzhou Industrial Park campus developed in phases. Its early development focused on the North Campus, whose plan was designed by the American architecture firm Perkins+Will.

The Central Building, designed by Aedas, contains the university library, museum and administrative facilities. Its design was inspired by Taihu stone, and the building was nominated at the 2014 World Architecture Festival.

The South Campus was designed by BDP and developed as the university's second major phase of campus expansion. BDP describes the project as a campus masterplan including teaching, laboratory and research facilities.

=== Taicang campus ===
XJTLU also operates XJTLU Entrepreneur College in Taicang, a county-level city affiliated with the city of Suzhou. The college admitted its first cohort of students in 2019, and the Taicang campus opened in September 2022.

== Rankings ==
Ranking	Scope	Year	Placement
QS World University Rankings	World	2027	1001–1200
Times Higher Education World University Rankings	World	2026	601–800
ShanghaiRanking Academic Ranking of World Universities	World	2026	701-800

== See also ==
- Higher education in China
- Transnational education
- Chinese-foreign cooperative universities
- University Alliance of the Silk Road
- Suzhou Industrial Park
- Dushu Lake
- Taicang
- University of Nottingham Ningbo China
- Duke Kunshan University
- NYU Shanghai
