= Suzhou Culture and Arts Centre =

Culture and arts center in Suzhou, Jiangsu, China

- 苏州文化艺术中心
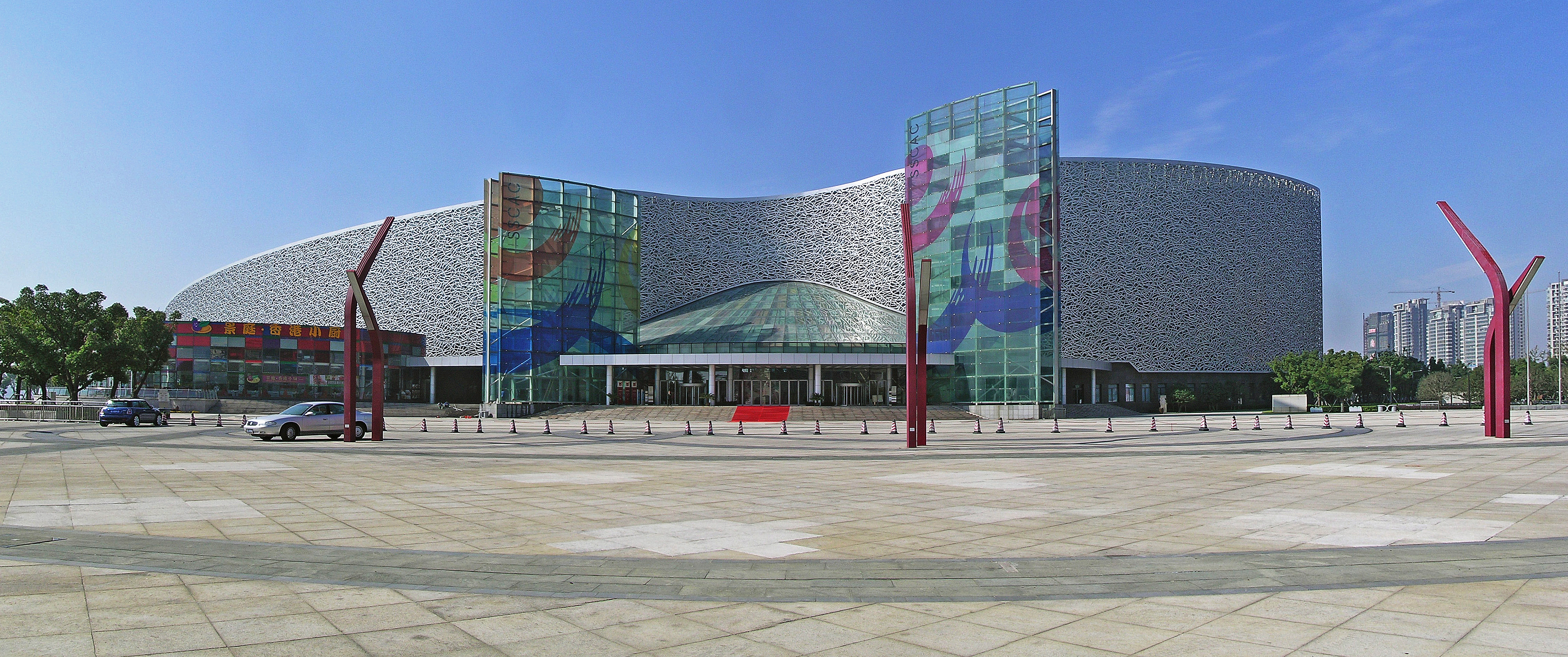
- View of the centre

General information
- Completed: October 1, 2007
- Cost: 1.7 billion yuan

Height
- Height: 22.5 m

Technical details
- Floor area: 150,000 m^{2}

Design and construction
- Architect: Paul Andreu

The Suzhou Culture and Arts Centre (Chinese: 苏州文化艺术中心; pinyin: Sūzhōu wénhuà yìshù zhōngxīn), formerly known as the Suzhou Science and Culture Arts Centre (SSCAC), located to the east of Jinji Lake at the China–Singapore Suzhou Industrial Park, Suzhou, Jiangsu, is a cultural centre in China. It occupies an area of 138,000 m^{2}, and its total gross floor area is 150,000 square metres. It is the permanent awards base of China Film Golden Rooster Awards.

The centre includes the Jinji Lake Art Museum, which displays contemporary art.
