= List of township-level divisions of Jiangsu =

Location of Jiangsu province in China

This is a list of township-level divisions of the province of Jiangsu, People's Republic of China (PRC). After province, prefecture, and county-level divisions, township-level divisions constitute the formal fourth-level administrative divisions of the PRC. There are a total of 1,312 such divisions in Jiangsu, divided into 330 subdistricts, 876 towns, 105 townships, and 1 ethnic townships. This list is divided first into the prefecture-level then the county-level divisions.

== Nanjing ==
Location of Nanjing in the province

=== Gulou District, Nanjing ===
Name	Chinese (S)	Hanyu Pinyin	Nanjing Mandarin Romanization	Population (2014)	Area (km^{2})
Subdistricts
Ninghailu Subdistrict	宁海路街道	Nínghǎi Lù Jiēdào			3.68
Huaqiaolu Subdistrict	华侨路街道	Huáqiáo Lù Jiēdào			3.7
Hunanlu Subdistrict	湖南路街道	Húnán Lù Jiēdào			2.62
Zhongyangmen Subdistrict	中央门街道	Zhōngyāngmén Jiēdào			3.37
Yijiangmen Subdistrict	挹江门街道	Yìjiāngmén Jiēdào			3.34
Jiangdong Subdistrict	江东街道	Jiāngdōng Jiēdào			5
Fenghuang Subdistrict	凤凰街道	Fènghuáng Jiēdào			3.85
Yuejianglou Subdistrict	阅江楼街道	Yuèjiānglóu Jiēdào			3.74
Rehenanlu Subdistrict	热河南路街道	Rèhé Nán Lù Jiēdào			2.73
Mufushan Subdistrict	幕府山街道	Mùfǔ Shān Jiēdào			6.47
Jianninglu Subdistrict	建宁路街道	Jiànníng Lù Jiēdào			2.4
Baotajiao Subdistrict	宝塔桥街道	Bǎotǎqiáo Jiēdào			7.2
Xiaoshi Subdistrict	小市街道	Xiǎoshì Jiēdào			4.9

Subdistricts:

- Huaqiaolu Subdistrict (华侨路街道), Ninghailu Subdistrict (宁海路街道), Hunanlu Subdistrict (湖南路街道), Zhongyangmen Subdistrict (中央门街道), Mochou Subdistrict (莫愁街道), Jiangdong Subdistrict (江东街道), Yijiangmen Subdistrict (挹江门街道), Fenghuang Subdistrict (凤凰街道)

=== Jiangning District ===
Subdistricts:

- Dongshan Subdistrict (东山街道), Moling Subdistrict (秣陵街道), Tangshan Subdistrict (汤山街道), Chunhua Subdistrict (淳化街道), Lukou Subdistrict (禄口街道), Jiangning Subdistrict (江宁街道), Guli Subdistrict (谷里街道), Hushu Subdistrict (湖熟街道), Hengxi Subdistrict (横溪街道), Qilin Subdistrict (麒麟街道)

=== Jianye District ===
Subdistricts:

- Mochouhu Subdistrict (莫愁湖街道), Nanyuan Subdistrict (南苑街道), Xinglong Subdistrict (兴隆街道), Shuangzha Subdistrict (双闸街道), Shazhou Subdistrict (沙洲街道), Jiangxinzhou Subdistrict (江心洲街道)

-Binhu Subdistrict (滨湖街道) and Nanhu Subdistrict (南湖街道) are merged with Mochu Subdistrict(莫愁街道)of Gulou District to form Mochouhu Subdistrict.

=== Luhe (Liuhe) District ===
Subdistricts:

- Shanpan Subdistrict (山潘街道), Xichangmen Subdistrict (西厂门街道), Xiejiadian Subdistrict (卸甲甸街道), Getang Subdistrict (葛塘街道), Changlu Subdistrict (长芦街道), Xiongzhou Subdistrict (雄州街道), Longchi Subdistrict (龙池街道), Chengqiao Subdistrict (程桥街道), Jinniuhu Subdistrict (金牛湖街道), Hengliang Subdistrict (横梁街道)

Towns:

- Yeshan (冶山镇), Guabu (瓜埠镇), Donggou (东沟镇), Zhuzhen (竹镇镇), Maji (马集镇), Longpao (龙袍镇), Yudai (玉带镇), Ma'an (马鞍镇), Xinhuang (新篁镇), Babaiqiao (八百桥镇)

=== Pukou District ===
Subdistricts:

- Taishan Subdistrict (泰山街道), Dingshan Subdistrict (顶山街道), Yanjiang Subdistrict (沿江街道), Jiangpu Subdistrict (江浦街道), Pancheng Subdistrict (盘城街道), Qiaolin Subdistrict (桥林街道), Tangquan Subdistrict (汤泉街道)

Towns:

- Yongning (永宁镇), Xingdian (星甸镇), Shiqiao (石桥镇), Wujiang (乌江镇)

=== Qinhuai District ===
Subdistricts:

- Wulaocun Subdistrict (五老村街道), Hongwulu Subdistrict (洪武路街道), Daguanglu Subdistrict (大光路街道), Ruijinlu Subdistrict (瑞金路街道), Yueyahu Subdistrict (月牙湖街道), Guanghualu Subdistrict (光华路街道), Chaotiangong Subdistrict (朝天宫街道), Fuzimiao Subdistrict (夫子庙街道), Shuangtang Subdistrict (双塘街道), Zhonghuamen Subdistrict (中华门街道), Qinhong Subdistrict (秦虹街道), Honghua Subdistrict (红花街道),

=== Qixia District ===
Subdistricts:

- Yaohua Subdistrict (尧化街道), Maigaoqiao Subdistrict (迈皋桥街道), Maqun Subdistrict (马群街道), Yanziji Subdistrict (燕子矶街道), Longtan Subdistrict (龙潭街道), Qixia Subdistrict (栖霞街道), Xianlin Subdistrict (仙林街道), Baguazhou Subdistrict (八卦洲街道), Jing'an Subdistrict (靖安街道), Xigang Subdistrict (西岗街道)

=== Xuanwu District ===
Subdistricts:

- Meiyuanxincun Subdistrict (梅园新村街道), Xinjiekou Subdistrict (新街口街道), Xuanwumen Subdistrict (玄武门街道), Houzaimen Subdistrict (后宰门街道), Suojincun Subdistrict (锁金村街道), Xiaolingwei Subdistrict (孝陵卫街道), Xuanwuhu Subdistrict (玄武湖街道), Hongshan Subdistrict (红山街道)

- Houzaimen Subdistrict (后宰门街道) was merged into Meiyuanxincun Subdistrict in 2012.

=== Yuhuatai District ===
Subdistricts:

- Yuhua New Village Subdistrict (雨花新村街道), Ningnan Subdistrict (宁南街道), Xishanqiao Subdistrict (西善桥街道), Banqiao Subdistrict (板桥街道), Tiexinqiao Subdistrict (铁心桥街道), Meishan Subdistrict (梅山街道), Saihongqiao Subdistrict (赛虹桥街道)

=== Gaochun District ===
Towns:

- Chunxi (淳溪镇), Gucheng (固城镇), Dongba (东坝镇), Yaxi (桠溪镇), Qiqiao (漆桥镇), Yangjiang (阳江镇), Zhuanqiang (砖墙镇), Gubai (古柏镇)

=== Lishui District ===
Towns:

- Yongyang (永阳镇), Zhetang (柘塘镇), Honglan (洪蓝镇), Shiqiu (石湫镇), Dongping (东屏镇), Baima (白马镇), Hefeng (和凤镇), Jingqiao (晶桥镇)

Others:

- Lishui Development Zone (溧水开发区), Lishui County Forestry (溧水县林场)

== Changzhou ==
=== Qishuyan District ===
Subdistricts:

- Qishuyan Subdistrict (戚墅堰街道), Dingyan Subdistrict (丁堰街道), Lucheng Subdistrict (潞城街道)

=== Tianning District ===
Subdistricts:

- Lanling Subdistrict (兰陵街道 ), Chashan Subdistrict (茶山街道), Diaozhuang Subdistrict (雕庄街道), Hongmei Subdistrict (红梅街道), Qinglong Subdistrict (青龙街道), Tianning Subdistrict (天宁街道)

Other:

- Tianning Economic Development Zone (天宁经济开发区)

=== Wujin District ===
Subdistricts:

- Nanxiashu Subdistrict (南夏墅街道), Xihu Subdistrict (西湖街道)

Towns:

- Hutang (湖塘镇), Niutang (牛塘镇), Luoyang (洛阳镇), Yaoguan (遥观镇), Henglin (横林镇), Xueyan (雪堰镇), Zhenglu (郑陆镇), Hengshanqiao (横山桥镇), Qianhuang (前黄镇), Lijia (礼嘉镇), Zouqu (邹区镇), Jiaze (嘉泽镇), Huangli (湟里镇), Benniu (奔牛镇)

=== Xinbei District ===
Subdistricts:

- Hehai Subdistrict (河海街道), Sanjing Subdistrict (三井街道), Longhutang Subdistrict (龙虎塘街道)

Towns:

- Chunjiang (春江镇), Menghe (孟河镇), Xinqiao (新桥镇), Xuejia (薛家镇), Luoxi (罗溪镇), Xixiashu (西夏墅镇)

=== Zhonglou District ===
Subdistricts:

- Wuxing Subdistrict (五星街道), Yongjiang Subdistrict (永红街道), Beigang Subdistrict (北港街道), Xilin Subdistrict (西林街道), Hehuachi Subdistrict (荷花池街道), Nandajie Subdistrict (南大街街道), Xinzha Subdistrict (新闸街道)

=== Jintan ===
Towns:

- Jincheng (金城镇), Rulin (儒林镇), Yaotang (尧塘镇), Zhixi (直溪镇), Zhulin (朱林镇), Xuebu (薛埠镇), Zhiqian (指前镇)

=== Liyang ===
Towns:

- Licheng (溧城镇), Daitou (埭头镇), Shanghuang (上黄镇), Daibu (戴埠镇), Tianmuhu (天目湖镇), Bieqiao (别桥镇), Shangxing (上兴镇), Zhuze (竹箦镇), Nandu (南渡镇), Shezhu (社渚镇)

== Huai'an ==
Location of Huai'an in the province

=== Huai'an District ===
Towns:

- Huaicheng (淮城镇), Pingqiao (平桥镇), Shanghe (上河镇), Madian (马甸镇), Zhuqiao (朱桥镇), Xihe (溪河镇), Shihe (施河镇), Cheqiao (车桥镇), Jingkou (泾口镇), Liujun (流均镇), Boli (博里镇), Chouqiao (仇桥镇), Fuxing (复兴镇), Suzui (苏嘴镇), Qingong (钦工镇), Shunhe (顺河镇), Jiqiao (季桥镇), Xiqiao (席桥镇), Linji (林集镇), Nanzha (南闸镇), Fanji (范集镇)

Townships:

- Jianhuai Township (建淮乡), Jiaoling Township (茭陵乡), Songji Township (宋集乡), Chengdong Township (城东乡), Sanbao Township (三堡乡), Nanmachang Township (南马厂乡)

=== Huaiyin District ===
Towns:

- Wangying (王营镇), Zhaoji (赵集镇), Wucheng (吴城镇), Matou (码头镇), Nanchenji (南陈集镇), Wangxing (王兴镇), Mianhuazhuang (棉花庄镇), Dingji (丁集镇), Wuli (五里镇), Xuliu (徐溜镇), Yugou (渔沟镇), Wuji (吴集镇), Xisongji (西宋集镇), Sanshu (三树镇)

Townships:

- Hanqiao Township (韩桥乡), Xindu Township (新渡乡), Yuanji Township (袁集乡), Lingqiao Township (凌桥乡), Laozhangji Township (老张集乡), Guzhai Township (古寨乡), Liulaozhuang Township (刘老庄乡)

=== Qinghe District ===
Subdistricts:

- Fuqian Subdistrict (府前街道), Changxi Subdistrict (长西街道), Huaihai Subdistrict (淮海街道), Changdong Subdistrict (长东街道), Liushuwan Subdistrict (柳树湾街道), Donghu Subdistrict (东湖街道), Shuidukou Subdistrict (水渡口街道), Xingang Subdistrict (新港街道), Guangzhou Subdistrict (广州街道)

Townships:

- Bochi Township (钵池乡), Xuyang Township (徐扬乡)

=== Qingpu District ===
Subdistricts:

- Qingjiang Subdistrict (清江街道), Pulou Subdistrict (浦楼街道), Zhakou Subdistrict (闸口街道), Qing'an Subdistrict (清安街道)

Towns:

- Heping (和平镇), Wudun (武墩镇), Yanhe (盐河镇)

Townships:

- Chengnan Township (城南乡), Huangma Township (黄码乡)

=== Hongze County ===
Towns:

- Gaoliangjian (高良涧镇), Jiangba (蒋坝镇), Renhe (仁和镇), Chahe (岔河镇), Xishunhe (西顺河镇), Laozishan (老子山镇), Sanhe (三河镇), Dongshuanggou (东双沟镇), Wanji (万集镇), Huangji (黄集镇), Gonghe (共和镇)

=== Jinhu County ===
Towns:

- Licheng (黎城镇), Jinnan (金南镇), Minqiao (闵桥镇), Taji (塔集镇), Yinji (银集镇), Tugou (涂沟镇), Qianfeng (前锋镇), Lüliang (吕良镇), Chenqiao (陈桥镇), Jinbei (金北镇), Dailou (戴楼镇)

=== Lianshui County ===
Towns:

- Liancheng (涟城镇), Gaogou (高沟镇), Tangji (唐集镇), Baotan (保滩镇), Dadong (大东镇), Wugang (五港镇), Liangcha (梁岔镇), Shihu (石湖镇), Zhuma (朱码镇), Chamiao (岔庙镇), Qianjin (前进镇), Nanji (南集镇), Yixing (义兴镇), Chengji (成集镇), Hongyao (红窑镇), Chenshi (陈师镇), Donghuji (东胡集镇)

Townships:

- Xuji Township (徐集乡), Huangying Township (黄营乡)

=== Xuyi County ===
Towns:

- Xucheng (盱城镇), Maba (马坝镇), Guantan (官滩镇), Jiupu (旧铺镇), Guiwu (桂五镇), Huanghuatang (黄花塘镇), Mingzuling (明祖陵镇), Baoji (鲍集镇), Guanzhen (管镇镇), Heqiao (河桥镇), Tiefo (铁佛镇), Huaihe (淮河镇), Chouji (仇集镇), Guanyinsi (观音寺镇)

Townships:

- Weiqiao Township (维桥乡), Mudian Township (穆店乡), Wangdian Township (王店乡), Gusang Township (古桑乡), Xinglong Township (兴隆乡)

== Lianyungang ==
Location of Lianyungang in the province

=== Haizhou District ===
Subdistricts:

- Haizhou Subdistrict (海州街道), Xingfu Road Subdistrict (幸福路街道), Quyang Subdistrict (朐阳街道), Hongmen Subdistrict (洪门街道), Pudong Subdistrict (浦东街道), Puxi Subdistrict (浦西街道), Xindong Subdistrict (新东街道), Xinnan Subdistrict (新南街道), Lunan Subdistrict (路南街道), Xinhai Subdistrict (新海街道)

Towns:

- Xinba (新坝镇), Jinping (锦屏镇), Banpu (板浦镇), Nancheng (南城镇), Punan (浦南镇)

Township:

- Ninghai Township (宁海乡), Yuntai Township (云台乡), Huaguoshan Township (花果山乡)

=== Lianyun District ===
Subdistricts:

- Xugou Subdistrict (墟沟街道), Lianyun Subdistrict (连云街道), Zhongyun Subdistrict (中云街道), Liandao Subdistrict (连岛街道), Banqiao Subdistrict (板桥街道), Yunshan Subdistrict (云山街道), Houzui Subdistrict (猴嘴街道)

The only town is Chaoyang (朝阳镇)

Townships:

- Sucheng Township (宿城乡), Gaogongdao Township (高公岛乡), Qiansandao Township (前三岛乡)

=== Former Xinpu District ===
It (had 6 subdistricts, 2 towns and 2 township.) is merged to Haizhou District.

=== Donghai County ===
Towns:

- Niushan (牛山镇), Baitabu (白塔埠镇), Huangchuan (黄川镇), Taolin (桃林镇), Qinghu (青湖镇), Shiliu (石榴镇), Wenquan (温泉镇), Shuangdian (双店镇), Shilianghe (石梁河镇), Hongzhuang (洪庄镇), Anfeng (安峰镇), Fangshan (房山镇), Pingming (平明镇)

Townships:

- Tuofeng Township (驼峰乡), Shanzuokou Township (山左口乡), Henggou Township (横沟乡), Linian Township (李埝乡), Nanchen Township (南辰乡), Shihu Township (石湖乡), Quyang Township (曲阳乡), Zhangwan Township (张湾乡)

=== Ganyu County ===
Towns:

- Qingkou (青口镇), Zhewang (柘汪镇), Shiqiao (石桥镇), Jinshan (金山镇), Heilin (黑林镇), Lizhuang (厉庄镇), Haitou (海头镇), Tashan (塔山镇), Ganma (赣马镇), Banzhuang (班庄镇), Chengtou (城头镇), Menhe (门河镇), Chengxi (城西镇), Huandun (欢墩镇), Songzhuang (宋庄镇), Shahe (沙河镇), Dunshang (墩尚镇), Luoyang (罗阳镇)

=== Guannan County ===
Towns:

- Xin'an (新安镇), Changmao (长茂镇), Duigougang (堆沟港镇), Beichenji (北陈集镇), Zhangdian (张店镇), Sankou (三口镇), Mengxingzhuang (孟兴庄镇), Tanggou (汤沟镇), Bailu (百禄镇)

Townships:

- Wudui Township (五队乡), Tianlou Township (田楼乡), Liji Township (李集乡), Xinji Township (新集乡), Huayuan Township (花园乡)

=== Guanyun County ===
Towns:

- Yishan (伊山镇), Yangji (杨集镇), Longju (龙苴镇), Tongxing (同兴镇), Sidui (四队镇), Weifeng (圩丰镇), Yanweigang (燕尾港镇)

Townships:

- Yilu Township (伊芦乡), Luhe Township (鲁河乡), Tuhe Township (图河乡), Yibei Township (沂北乡), Xiache Township (下车乡), Baixian Township (白蚬乡), Shizhuang Township (侍庄乡), Dongwangji Township (东王集乡), Xiaoyi Township (小伊乡), Muxu Township (穆圩乡), Dougou Township (陡沟乡), Nangang Township (南岗乡)

== Nantong ==
Location of Nantong in the province

=== Chongchuan District ===
Subdistricts:

- Chengdong Subdistrict (城东街道), Rengang Subdistrict (任港街道), Hongqiao Subdistrict (虹桥街道), Xuetian Subdistrict (学田街道), Hepingqiao Subdistrict (和平桥街道), Xinchengqiao Subdistrict (新城桥街道), Zhongxiu Subdistrict (钟秀街道), Wenfeng (文峰街道), Zhongxing Subdistrict (中兴街道), Langshanzhen Subdistrict (狼山镇街道), Guanyinshan Subdistrict (观音山街道), Zhuxing Subdistrict (竹行街道), Xiaohai Subdistrict (小海街道)

The only town is Xinkai (新开镇)

=== Gangzha District ===
Subdistricts:

- Yongxing Subdistrict (永兴街道), Tangzhazhen Subdistrict (唐闸镇街道), Tianshenggangzhen Subdistrict (天生港镇街道), Qinzao Subdistrict (秦灶街道), Chenqiao Subdistrict (陈桥街道), Xingfu Subdistrict (幸福街道)

=== Tongzhou District ===
Towns:

- Jinsha (金沙镇), Xiting (西亭镇), Erjia (二甲镇), Dongshe (东社镇), Sanyu (三余镇), Shizong (十总镇), Qi'an (骑岸镇), Wujia (五甲镇), Shigang (石港镇), Si'an (四安镇), Liuqiao (刘桥镇), Pingchao (平潮镇), Pingdong (平东镇), Wujie (五接镇), Xingren (兴仁镇), Xingdong (兴东镇), Chuanjiang (川姜镇), Xianfeng (先锋镇), Zhangzhishan (张芝山镇)

=== Haimen ===
Towns:

- Haimen (海门镇), Sanxing (三星镇), Desheng (德胜镇), Sanchang (三厂镇), Changle (常乐镇), Qilin (麒麟镇), Yuelai (悦来镇), Wannian (万年镇), Sanyang (三阳镇), Sijia (四甲镇), Huolong (货隆镇), Yudong (余东镇), Zhengyu (正余镇), Baochang (包场镇), Liuhao (刘浩镇), Linjiang (临江镇), Wanghao (王浩镇), Shuxun (树勋镇), Dongzaogang (东灶港镇)

The only township is Haiyong Township (海永乡), a 9 km^{2} (3.5 sq mi) pene-enclave on Chongming Island, most of which belongs to Shanghai.

=== Qidong ===
Towns:

- Huilong (汇龙镇), Nanyang (南阳镇), Beixin (北新镇), Wangbao (王鲍镇), Hezuo (合作镇), Haifu (海复镇), Jinhai (近海镇), Yinyang (寅阳镇), Huiping (惠萍镇), Donghai (东海镇), Lüsigang (吕四港镇)

The only township is Qilong Township (启隆乡)

=== Rugao ===
Towns:

- Rucheng (如城镇), Chaiwan (柴湾镇), Xue'an (雪岸镇), Dongchen (东陈镇), Dingyan (丁堰镇), Baipu (白蒲镇), Linzi (林梓镇), Xiayuan (下原镇), Jiuhua (九华镇), Guoyuan (郭园镇), Shizhuang (石庄镇), Changjiang (长江镇), Wuyao (吴窑镇), Jiang'an (江安镇), Gaoming (高明镇), Changqing (常青镇), Banjing (搬经镇), Motou (磨头镇), Taoyuan (桃园镇), Yuanqiao (袁桥镇)

=== Hai'an County ===
Towns:

- Hai'an (海安镇), Chengdong (城东镇), Qutang (曲塘镇), Lipu (李堡镇), Dagong (大公镇), Jiaoxie (角斜镇), Yazhou (雅周镇), Baidian (白甸镇), Nanmo (南莫镇), Duntou (墩头镇)

=== Rudong County ===
Towns:

- Bingcha (栟茶镇), Caobu (曹埠镇), Chahe (岔河镇), Changsha (长沙镇), Dayu (大豫镇), Fengli (丰利镇), Hekou (河口镇), Ju (苴镇), Juegang (掘港镇), Matang (马塘镇), Shuangdian (双甸镇), Xindian (新店镇), Yangkou (洋口镇), Yuanzhuang (袁庄镇)

== Taizhou ==
Location of Taizhou in the province

=== Gaogang District ===
Subdistricts:

- Kou'an Subdistrict (口岸街道), Diaopu Subdistrict (刁铺街道), Xuzhuang Subdistrict (许庄街道)

Towns:

- Yong'anzhou (永安洲镇), Baima (白马镇), Yexu (野徐镇), Huzhuang (胡庄镇), Dasi (大泗镇)

=== Hailing District ===
Subdistricts:

- Chengdong Subdistrict (城东街道), Chengxi Subdistrict (城西街道), Chengnan Subdistrict (城南街道), Chengzhong Subdistrict (城中街道), Chengbei Subdistrict (城北街道), Taishan Subdistrict (泰山街道), Jingtailu Subdistrict (京泰路街道), Fenghuang Subdistrict (凤凰街道), Hongqi Subdistrict (红旗街道), Sixiang Subdistrict (寺巷街道), Mingzhu Subdistrict (明珠街道)

Towns:

- Jiulong (九龙镇), Gangyang (罡杨镇), Suchen (苏陈镇)

=== Jiangyan District ===
Towns:

- Jiangyan Town (姜堰镇), Qintong (溱潼镇), Jiangduo (蒋垛镇), Gugao (顾高镇), Dalun (大伦镇), Zhangdian (张甸镇), Liangxu (梁徐镇), Qiaotou (桥头镇), Yuxi (淤溪镇), Baimi (白米镇), Leizhuang (娄庄镇), Shengao (沈高镇), Xingtai (兴泰镇), Yuduo (俞垛镇), Huagang (华港镇)

=== Jingjiang ===
The only subdistrict is Jingcheng Subdistrict (靖城街道).

Towns:

- Xinqiao (新桥镇), Dongxing (东兴镇), Xieqiao (斜桥镇), Xilai (西来镇), Jishi (季市镇), Gushan (孤山镇), Shengci (生祠镇), Maqiao (马桥镇)

=== Taixing ===
The only subdistrict is Jichuan Subdistrict (济川街道)

Towns:

- Huangqiao (黄桥镇), Fenjie (分界镇), Guxi (古溪镇), Yuanzhu (元竹镇), Shanhu (珊瑚镇), Guangling (广陵镇), Quxia (曲霞镇), Zhangqiao (张桥镇), Heshi (河失镇), Xinjie (新街镇), Yaowang (姚王镇), Xuanbao (宣堡镇), Hongqiao (虹桥镇), Binjiang (滨江镇) | 济川街道办事处

The only township is Gensi Township (根思乡)

=== Xinghua ===
Towns:

- Daiyao (戴窑镇), Hechen (合陈镇), Yongfeng (永丰镇), Xinduo (新垛镇), Anfeng (安丰镇), Hainan (海南镇), Diaoyu (钓鱼镇), Dazou (大邹镇), Shagou (沙沟镇), Zhongbao (中堡镇), Lizhong (李中镇), Xijiao (西郊镇), Lincheng (临城镇), Duotian (垛田镇), Zhuhong (竹泓镇), Shenlun (沈伦镇), Daduo (大垛镇), Huoduo (荻垛镇), Taozhuang (陶庄镇), Changrong (昌荣镇), Maoshan (茅山镇), Zhouzhuang (周庄镇), Chenbao (陈堡镇), Dainan (戴南镇), Zhangguo (张郭镇), Zhaoyang (昭阳镇), Daying (大营镇), Xiaxu (下圩镇), Chengdong (城东镇)

Townships:

- Laowei Township (老圩乡), Zhoufen Township (周奋乡), Ganggu Township (缸顾乡), Xibao Township (西鲍乡), Linhu Township (林湖乡)

== Suqian ==
Location of Suqian in the province

=== Sucheng District ===
Subdistricts:

- Xingfu Subdistrict (幸福街道), Shunli Subdistrict (项里街道), Hebin Subdistrict (河滨街道), Gucheng Subdistrict (古城街道), Huanghe Subdistrict (黄河街道), Guchu Subdistrict (古楚街道)

Towns:

- Shuangzhuang (双庄镇), Gengche (耿车镇), Buzi (埠子镇), Longhe (龙河镇), Yangbei (洋北镇), Cangji (仓集镇), Yanghe (洋河镇), Zhongyang (中杨镇), Zhenglou (郑楼镇), Chenji (陈集镇)

Townships:

- Sankeshu Township (三棵树乡), Luowei Township (罗圩乡), Nancai Township (南蔡乡), Tuyuan Township (屠园乡)

=== Suyu District ===
Towns:

- Shunhe (顺河镇), Xiaodian (晓店镇), Caiji (蔡集镇), Dingzui (丁嘴镇), Zaohe (皂河镇), Yanghua (仰化镇), Daxing (大兴镇), Wangguanji (王官集镇), Lailong (来龙镇), Huangdun (黄墩镇), Luji (陆集镇), Guanmiao (关庙镇), Shiling (侍岭镇), Xinzhuang (新庄镇)

Townships:

- Jingtou Township (井头乡), Caoji Township (曹集乡), Bao'an Township (保安乡)

=== Shuyang County ===
Subdistricts:

- Shucheng (沭城镇), Mengxi (梦溪街道), Nanhu (南湖街道), Zhangji(章集街道), Qixiong(七雄街道), Shizi(十字街道)

Towns:

- Longji (陇集镇), Huji (胡集镇), Qianji (钱集镇), Tanggou (塘沟镇), Machang (马厂镇), Yishou (沂涛镇), Miaotou (庙头镇), Hanshan (韩山镇), Huachong (华冲镇), Sangxu (桑墟镇), Yuelai (悦来镇), Liuji (刘集镇), Lihuan (李恒镇), Zhaxia (扎下镇), Yanji (颜集镇), Tongyang (潼阳镇), Longmiao (龙庙镇), Gaoxu (高墟镇), Gengxu (耿圩镇), Tangjian (汤涧镇), Xinhe (新河镇), Xianguan (贤官镇), Wuji (吴集镇), Hudong (湖东镇), Qingyihu (青伊湖镇)

Townships:

- Beidingji Township (北丁集乡), Zhouji Township (周集乡), Dongshaodian Township (东小店乡), Zhangwei Township (张圩乡), Maowei Township (茆圩乡), Xiwei Township (西圩乡), Wanpi Township (万匹乡), Guandun Township (官墩乡)

=== Sihong County ===
Towns:

- Qingyang (青阳镇), Shuanggou (双沟镇), Shangtang (上塘镇), Weiying (魏营镇), Linhuai (临淮镇), Bancheng (半城镇), Sunyuan (孙园镇), Meihua (梅花镇), Guiren (归仁镇), Jinsuo (金锁镇), Zhuhu (朱湖镇), Jieji (界集镇), Taiping (太平镇), Longji (龙集镇)

Townships:

- Sihe Township (四河乡), Fengshan Township (峰山乡), Caomiao Township (曹庙乡), Chemen Township (车门乡), Yaogou Township (瑶沟乡), Shiji Township (石集乡), Chengtou Township (城头乡), Chenxu Township (陈圩乡), Tianganghu Township (天岗湖乡)

=== Siyang County ===
Towns:

- Zhongxing (众兴镇), Aiyuan (爱园镇), Wangji (王集镇), Peixu (裴圩镇), Xinyuan (新袁镇), Likou (李口镇), Linhe (临河镇), Chuancheng (穿城镇), Luji (卢集镇), Gaodu (高渡镇), Zhangjiaxu (张家圩镇)

Townships:

- Zhuangwei Township (庄圩乡), Liren Township (里仁乡), Sanzhuang Township (三庄乡), Baji Township (八集乡), Nanliuji Township (南刘集乡)

== Suzhou ==
Location of Suzhou in the province

=== Canglang District ===
Subdistricts:

- Shuangta Subdistrict (双塔街道), Nanmen Subdistrict (南门街道), Xujiang Subdistrict (胥江街道), Wumenqiao Subdistrict (吴门桥街道), Fengmen Subdistrict (葑门街道), Youxin Subdistrict (友新街道)

=== Gusu District ===
Gusu District has eight subdistricts.

Its subdistricts are Baiyangwan Subdistrict (Chinese: 白洋湾街道), Pingjiang Subdistrict (Chinese: 平江街道), Jinchang Subdistrict (Chinese: 金阊街道), Canglang Subdistrict (Chinese: 沧浪街道), Shuangta Subdistrict (Chinese: 双塔街道), Huqiu Subdistrict (Chinese: 虎丘街道), Sujin Subdistrict (Chinese: 苏锦街道), and Wumenqiao Subdistrict (Chinese: 吴门桥街道).

=== Huqiu District ===
Subdistricts:

- Fengqiao Subdistrict (枫桥街道), Shishan Subdistrict (狮山街道), Hengtang Subdistrict (横塘街道)

Towns:

- Hushuguan (浒墅关镇), Tong'an (通安镇), Dongzhu (东渚镇)

=== Jinchang District ===
Subdistricts:

- Shilu Subdistrict (石路街道), Caixiang Subdistrict (彩香街道), Liuyuan Subdistrict (留园街道), Huqiu Subdistrict (虎丘街道), Baiyangwan Subdistrict (白洋湾街道)

=== Wuzhong District ===
Subdistricts:

- Suyuan Subdistrict (苏苑街道), Changqiao Subdistrict (长桥街道), Longxi Subdistrict (龙西街道), Chengnan Subdistrict (城南街道), Zhaoxi Subdistrict (越溪街道), Hengjing Subdistrict (横泾街道), Guoxiang Subdistrict (郭巷街道), Xiangshan Subdistrict (香山街道)

Towns:

- Luzhi (甪直镇), Guangfu (光福镇), Linhu (临湖镇), Mudu (木渎镇), Jinting (金庭镇), Dongshan (东山镇), Xukou (胥口镇)

=== Wujiang District ===
The only subdistrict is Binhu Subdistrict (滨湖街道)

Towns:

- Songling (松陵镇), Tongli (同里镇), Pingwang (平望镇), Shengze (盛泽镇), Qidu (七都镇), Zhenze (震泽镇), Taoyuan (桃源镇), Fenhu (汾湖镇)

=== Xiangcheng District ===
Subdistricts:

- Yuanhe Subdistrict (元和街道), Taiping Subdistrict (太平街道), Huangqiao Subdistrict (黄桥街道), Beiqiao Subdistrict (北桥街道)

Towns:

- Wangting (望亭镇), Huangdai (黄埭镇), Weitang (渭塘镇), Yangchenghu (阳澄湖镇)

Other:

- Xiangcheng Economic Development Zone (相城经济开发区)

=== Changshu ===
The only subdistrict is Bixi Subdistrict (碧溪街道)

Towns:

- Yushan (虞山镇), Haiyu (海虞镇), Xinzhuang (辛庄镇), Shanghu (尚湖镇), Meili (梅李镇), Zhitang (支塘镇), Dongbang (董浜镇), Guli (古里镇), Shajiabang (沙家浜镇)

=== Kunshan ===
Towns:

- Yushan (玉山镇), Zhouzhuang (周庄镇), Zhoushi (周市镇), Jinxi (锦溪镇), Bacheng (巴城镇), Huaqiao (花桥镇), Lujia (陆家镇), Zhangpu (张浦镇), Qiandeng (千灯镇), Dianshanhu (淀山湖镇)

=== Taicang ===
Towns:

- Chengxiang (城厢镇), Shaxi (沙溪镇), Ludu (陆渡镇), Liuhe (浏河镇), Fuqiao (浮桥镇), Huangjing (璜泾镇), Shuangfeng (双凤镇)

=== Zhangjiagang ===
Towns:

- Yangshe (杨舍镇), Jinfeng (锦丰镇), Tangqiao (塘桥镇), Leyu (乐余镇), Nanfeng (南丰镇), Jingang (金港镇), Fenghuang (凤凰镇), Daxin (大新镇)

Other areas:

- Changyinsha Modern Agriculture Demonstration Zone (常沙阴现代农业示范园区), Shuangshandao Island Tourist Resort (双山岛旅游度假区), (张家港经济技术开发区), (张家港保税区), (张家港市市稻麦良种场), (张家港市畜禽良种场), (张家港市冶金工业园)

=== Suzhou Industrial Park ===
Towns:

- Loufeng (娄葑镇), Weiting (唯亭镇), Shengpu (胜浦镇)

== Wuxi ==
Location of Wuxi in the province

=== Beitang District ===
Subdistricts:

- Huangxiang Subdistrict (黄巷街道), Shanbei Subdistrict (山北街道), Beidajie Subdistrict (北大街街道), Huishan Subdistrict (惠山街道), Wuhe Subdistrict (五河街道)

=== Binhu District ===
Subdistricts:

- Helie Subdistrict (河埒街道), Rongxiang Subdistrict (荣巷街道), Lihu Subdistrict (蠡湖街道), Liyuan Subdistrict (蠡园街道), Huazhuang Subdistrict (华庄街道), Taihu Subdistrict (太湖街道), Binhu Subdistrict (滨湖街道), Xuelang Subdistrict (雪浪街道), Mashan Subdistrict (马山街道)

=== Chong'an District ===
Subdistricts:

- Chong'ansi Subdistrict (崇安寺街道), Tongjiang Subdistrict (通江街道), Guangrui Road Subdistrict (广瑞路街道), Mashangdun Subdistrict (上马墩街道), Jianghai Subdistrict (江海街道), Guangyi Subdistrict (广益街道)

=== Huishan District ===
Subdistricts:

- Yanqiao Subdistrict (堰桥街道), Chang'an Subdistrict (长安街道), Qianqiao Subdistrict (钱桥街道), Qianzhou Subdistrict (前洲街道), Yuqi Subdistrict (玉祁街道)

Towns:

- Luoshe (洛社镇), Yangshan (阳山镇)

=== Nanchang District ===
Subdistricts:

- Yinglongqiao Subdistrict (迎龙桥街道), Nanchansi Subdistrict (南禅寺街道), Qingmingqiao Subdistrict (清名桥街道), Jinxing Subdistrict (金星街道), Jinkui Subdistrict (金匮街道), Yangming Subdistrict (扬名街道)

=== Xishan District ===
Subdistricts:

- Dongting Subdistrict (东亭街道), Dongbeitang Subdistrict (东北塘街道), Anzhen Subdistrict (安镇街道), Mashan Subdistrict (马山街道)

Towns:

- Yangjian (羊尖镇), Ehu (鹅湖镇), Xibei (锡北镇), Donggang (东港镇)

=== Jiangyin ===
Subdistricts:

- Chengjiang Subdistrict (澄江街道), Shengang Subdistrict (申港街道), Xiagang Subdistrict (夏港街道), Nanzha Subdistrict (南闸街道), Yunting Subdistrict (云亭街道)

Towns:

- Huangtu (璜土镇), Ligang (利港镇), Yuecheng (月城镇), Qingyang (青阳镇), Xuxiake (徐霞客镇), Huashi (华士镇), Zhouzhuang (周庄镇), Xinqiao (新桥镇), Changjing (长泾镇), Gushan (顾山镇), Zhutang (祝塘镇)

=== Yixing ===
Subdistricts:

- Yicheng Subdistrict (宜城街道), Qiting Subdistrict (屺亭街道), Xinzhuang Subdistrict (新庄街道), Xinjie Subdistrict (新街街道)

Towns:

- Dingshu (丁蜀镇), Zhangzhu (张渚镇), Heqiao (和桥镇), Guanlin (官林镇), Zhoutie (周铁镇), Xushe (徐舍镇), Gaocheng (高塍镇), Hufu (湖父镇), Yangxiang (杨巷镇), Taihua (太华镇), Xinjian (新建镇), Fangqiao (芳桥镇), Xizhu (西渚镇), Wanshi (万石镇)

=== Wuxi New Area ===
Subdistricts:

- Wangzhuang Subdistrict (旺庄街道), Nanzhan Subdistrict (南站街道), Shuofang Subdistrict (硕放街道), Fangqian Subdistrict (坊前街道), Xin'an Subdistrict (新安街道), Meicun Subdistrict (梅村街道), Hongshan Subdistrict (鸿山街道)

== Xuzhou ==
Location of Xuzhou in the province

=== Gulou District, Xuzhou ===
Subdistricts:

- Huanglou Subdistrict (黄楼街道), Fengcai Subdistrict (丰财街道), Pipa Subdistrict (琵琶街道), Pailou Subdistrict (牌楼街道), Tongpei Subdistrict (铜沛街道), Huancheng Subdistrict (环城街道), Jinshanqiao Subdistrict (金山桥街道), Donghuan Subdistrict (东环街道)

The only town is Miaoshan (庙山镇)

=== Jiawang District ===
Subdistricts:

- Laokuang Subdistrict (老矿街道), Xiaqiao Subdistrict (夏桥街道)

Towns:

- Jiawang Town (贾汪镇), Qingshanquan (青山泉镇), Dawu (大吴镇), Zizhuang (紫庄镇), Tashan (塔山镇), Biantang (汴塘镇), Jiangzhuang (江庄镇)

=== Quanshan District ===
Subdistricts:

- Wangling Subdistrict (王陵街道), Yong'an Subdistrict (永安街道), Hubin Subdistrict (湖滨街道), Duanzhuang Subdistrict (段庄街道), Zhaishan Subdistrict (翟山街道), Kuishan Subdistrict (奎山街道), Heping Subdistrict (和平街道), Taishan Subdistrict (泰山街道), Jinshan Subdistrict (金山街道), Qiligou Subdistrict (七里沟街道), Huohua Subdistrict (火花街道), Sushan Subdistrict (苏山街道 ), Taoyuan Subdistrict (桃园街道), Pangzhuang Subdistrict (庞庄街道)

=== Tongshan District ===
Subdistricts:

- Yi'an Subdistrict (义安街道), Liguo Subdistrict (利国街道), Chacheng Subdistrict (垞城街道), Dianchang Subdistrict (电厂街道), Zhangshuanglou Subdistrict (张双楼街道), Sanhejian Subdistrict (三河尖街道), Shitun Subdistrict (拾屯街道), Zhangji Subdistrict (张集街道)

Towns:

- Tongshan (铜山镇), Heqiao (何桥镇), Huangji (黄集镇), Mapo (马坡镇), Zhengji (郑集镇), Liuxin (柳新镇), Liuji (刘集镇), Dapeng (大彭镇), Hanwang (汉王镇), Sanbao (三堡镇), Tangzhang (棠张镇), Zhangji (张集镇), Fangcun (房村镇), Yizhuang (伊庄镇), Danji (单集镇), Xuzhuang (徐庄镇), Daxu (大许镇), Maocun (茅村镇), Liuquan (柳泉镇), Liguo (利国镇)

=== Yunlong District ===
Subdistricts:

- Pengcheng Subdistrict (彭城街道), Qingnian Subdistrict (青年街道), Tianqiao Subdistrict (天桥街道 Zifang Subdistrict (子房街道), Huangshan Subdistrict (黄山街道), Luotuoshan Subdistrict (骆驼山街道), Daguozhuang Subdistrict (大郭庄街道), Cuipingshan Subdistrict (翠屏山街道), Pantang Subdistrict (潘塘街道)

=== Pizhou ===
Towns:

- Yunhe (运河镇), Picheng (邳城镇), Guanhu (官湖镇), Sihu (四户镇), Suyangshan (宿羊山镇), Bayiji (八义集镇), Tushan (土山镇), Nianzhuang (碾庄镇), Gangshang (港上镇), Zouzhuang (邹庄镇), Zhancheng (占城镇), Xinhe (新河镇), Balu (八路镇), Paoche (炮车镇), Tiefu (铁富镇), Chahe (岔河镇), Daixu (戴圩镇), Chenlou (陈楼镇), Xinglou (邢楼镇), Daizhuang (戴庄镇), Chefushan (车辐山镇), Yanzibu (燕子埠镇), Zhaodun (赵墩镇), Yitang (议堂镇)

=== Xinyi ===
Towns:

- Xin'an (新安镇), Wayao (瓦窑镇), Gangtou (港头镇), Tangdian (唐店镇), Hegou (合沟镇), Caoqiao (草桥镇), Yaowan (窑湾镇), Qipan (棋盘镇), Xindian (新店镇), Shaodian (邵店镇), Beigou (北沟镇), Shiji (时集镇), Gaoliu (高流镇), Ahu (阿湖镇), Shuangtang (双塘镇), Malingshan (马陵山镇)

=== Feng County ===
Towns:

- Fengcheng (凤城镇), Shouxian (首羡镇), Shunhe (顺河镇), Changdian (常店镇), Huankou (欢口镇), Shizhai (师寨镇), Huashan (华山镇), Liangzhai (梁寨镇), Fanlou (范楼镇), Sunlou (孙楼镇), Songlou (宋楼镇), Dashahe (大沙河镇), Wanggou (王沟镇), Zhaozhuang (赵庄镇)

=== Pei County ===
Towns:

- Longgu (龙固镇), Yangtun (杨屯镇), Datun (大屯镇), Peicheng (沛城镇), Huzhai (胡寨镇), Weimiao (魏庙镇), Wuduan (五段镇), Zhangzhuang (张庄镇), Zhangzhai (张寨镇), Jing'an (敬安镇), Hekou (河口镇), Qishan (栖山镇), Lulou (鹿楼镇), Zhuzhai (朱寨镇), Anguo (安国镇)

=== Suining County ===
Subdistricts:

- Suicheng (睢城街道), Jincheng (金城街道), Suihe (睢河街道)

Towns:

- Wangji (王集镇), Shuanggou (双沟镇), Lanshan (岚山镇), Liji (李集镇), Taoyuan (桃园镇), Guanshan (官山镇), Gaozuo (高作镇), Shaji (沙集镇), Lingcheng (凌城镇), Qiuji (邱集镇), Gupi (古邳镇), Yaoji (姚集镇), Weiji (魏集镇), Liangji (梁集镇), Qing'an (庆安镇)

== Yancheng ==
Location of Yancheng in the province

=== Tinghu District ===
Subdistricts:

- Wuxing Subdistrict (五星街道), Wenfeng Subdistrict (文峰街道), Xianfeng Subdistrict (先锋街道), Yulong Subdistrict (毓龙街道), Dayang Subdistrict (大洋街道), Huanghai Subdistrict (黄海街道), Xinyang Subdistrict (新洋街道), Xincheng Subdistrict (新城街道), Wuyou Subdistrict (伍佑街道)

Towns:

- Nanyang (南洋镇), Xinxing (新兴镇), Biancang (便仓镇), Bufeng (步凤镇), Huangjian (黄尖镇), Yandong (盐东镇)

=== Yandu District ===
Subdistricts:

- Panhuang Subdistrict (潘黄街道), Yanlong Subdistrict (盐龙街道), Xindu Subdistrict (新都街道), Zhangzhuang Subdistrict (张庄街道)

Towns:

- Longgang (龙冈镇), Dazonghu (大纵湖镇), Dagang (大冈镇), Louwang (楼王镇), Xuefu (学富镇), Shangzhuang (尚庄镇), Qinnan (秦南镇), Guomeng (郭猛镇)

=== Dafeng ===
Towns:

- Dazhong (大中镇), Caoyan (草堰镇), Baiju (白驹镇), Liuzhuang (刘庄镇), Xituan (西团镇), Xiaohai (小海镇), Daqiao (大桥镇), Caomiao (草庙镇), Wanying (万盈镇, Nanyang (南阳镇)

=== Dongtai ===
Towns:

- Qindong (溱东镇), Shinian (时埝镇), Wulie (五烈镇), Liangduo (梁垛镇), Anfeng (安丰镇) Dongtai Town (东台镇), Fu'an (富安镇), Tangyang (唐洋镇), Xinjie (新街镇), Xuhe (许河镇), Sancang (三仓镇), Touzao (头灶镇), Jianggang (弶港镇), Nanshenzao (南沈灶镇)

=== Binhai County ===
Towns:

- Dongkan (东坎镇), Wuxun (五汛镇), Caiqiao (蔡桥镇), Zhenghong (正红镇), Tongyu (通榆镇), Jiepai (界牌镇), Baju (八巨镇), Batan (八滩镇), Binhuai (滨淮镇), Binhaigang (滨海港镇),

Townships:

- Tianchang Township (天场乡), Datao Township (大套乡), Chentao Township (陈涛乡), Zhendong Township (振东乡), Fanji Township (樊集乡)

=== Funing County ===
Towns:

- Fucheng (阜城镇), Goudun (沟墩镇), Wutan (吴滩镇), Heli (合利镇), Chenliang (陈良镇), Shizhuang (施庄镇), Sanzao (三灶镇), Guoshu (郭墅镇), Xingou (新沟镇), Chenji (陈集镇), Yangzhai (羊寨镇), Lupu (芦蒲镇), Shuoji (硕集镇), Banhu (板湖镇), Donggou (东沟镇), Yilin (益林镇), Gongxing (公兴镇), Yangji (杨集镇), Guhe (古河镇), Luoqiao (罗桥镇)

=== Jianhu County ===
Towns:

- Jinhu (近湖镇), Jianyang (建阳镇), Jiangying (蒋营镇), Hengji (恒济镇), Yandan (颜单镇), Yanhe (沿河镇), Lugou (芦沟镇), Qingfeng (庆丰镇), Shanggang (上冈镇), Gaozuo (高作镇), Gangxi (冈西镇), Baota (宝塔镇)

=== Sheyang County ===
Towns:

- Hede (合德镇), Linhai (临海镇), Qianqiu (千秋镇), Siming (四明镇), Haihe (海河镇), Haitong (海通镇), Xingqiao (兴桥镇), Xintan (新坍镇), Changdang (长荡镇), Panwan (盘湾镇), Teyong (特庸镇), Yangma (洋马镇), Huangshagang (黄沙港镇)

=== Xiangshui County ===
Eight towns:

- Xiangshui (响水镇), Chenjiagang (陈家港镇), Xiaojian (小尖镇), Huangwei (黄圩镇), Dayou (大有镇), Shuanggang (双港镇), Nanhe (南河镇), Yunhe (运河镇)

Three other areas:

- Xiangshui County Economic and Technological Development Zone (县开发区), Huanghai Farm (省属黄海农场), Guandong Saltern (省属灌东盐场)

== Yangzhou ==
Location of Yangzhou in the province

=== Guangling District ===
Subdistricts:

- Dongguan Subdistrict (东关街道), Wenhe Subdistrict (汶河街道), Wenfeng Subdistrict (文峰街道), Qujiang Subdistrict (曲江街道)

The only town is Wantou (湾头镇), and the only township is Tangwang Township (汤汪乡)

=== Hanjiang District ===
Subdistricts:

- Hanshang Subdistrict (邗上街道), Xinsheng Subdistrict (新盛街道), Jiangwang Subdistrict (蒋王街道), Chahe Subdistrict (汊河街道), Shuangqiao Subdistrict (双桥街道), Meiling Subdistrict (梅岭街道), Ganquan Subdistrict (甘泉街道), Shouxihu Subdistrict (瘦西湖街道), Yangzijin Subdistrict (扬子津街道), Wenhui Subdistrict (文汇街道)

Towns:

- Gongdao (公道镇), Fangxiang (方巷镇), Huaisi (槐泗镇), Guazhou (瓜洲镇), Touqiao (头桥镇), Yangshou (杨寿镇), Tai'an (泰安镇), Yangmiao (杨庙镇), Xihu (西湖镇), Puxi (朴席镇)

Townships:

- Pingshan Township (平山乡), Shuangqiao Township (双桥乡), Chengbei Township (城北乡)

=== Jiangdu District ===
Towns:

- Xiannü (仙女镇), Xiaoji (小纪镇), Hongjian (武坚镇), Fanchuan (樊川镇), Zhenwu (真武镇), Yiling (宜陵镇), Dinggou (丁沟镇), Guocun (郭村镇), Shaobo (邵伯镇), Dinghuo (丁伙镇), Daqiao (大桥镇), Wuqiao (吴桥镇), Putou (浦头镇)

=== Gaoyou ===
Towns:

- Gaoyou Town (高邮镇), Longqiu (龙虬镇), Mapeng (马棚镇), Cheluo (车逻镇), Baqiao (八桥镇), Hanliu (汉留镇), Tangzhuang (汤庄镇), Xiejia (卸甲镇), Sanduo (三垛镇), Ganduo (甘垛镇), Situ (司徒镇), Hengjing (横泾镇), Jieshou (界首镇), Zhoushan (周山镇), Zhouxiang (周巷镇), Linze (临泽镇), Songqiao (送桥镇), Guoji (郭集镇), Tianshan (天山镇)

The only township is Lingtang Hui Ethnic Township (菱塘回族乡)

=== Yizheng ===
Towns:

- Zhenzhou (真州镇), Qingshan (青山镇), Xinji (新集镇), Xincheng (新城镇), Maji (马集镇), Liuji (刘集镇), Chenji (陈集镇), Dayi (大仪镇), Yuetang (月塘镇)

=== Baoying County ===
Towns:

- Anyi (安宜镇), Fanshui (范水镇), Xiaji (夏集镇), Liubao (柳堡镇), Caodian (曹甸镇), Shanyang (山阳镇), Luduo (鲁垛镇), Huangcheng (黄塍镇), Jinghe (泾河镇), Sheyanghu (射阳湖镇), Xi'anfeng (西安丰镇), Guangyanghu (广洋湖镇), Xiaoguanzhuang (小官庄镇), Wangzhigang (望直港镇)

== Zhenjiang ==
Location of Zhenjiang in the province

=== Dantu District ===
The only subdistrict is Gaozi Subdistrict (高资街道)

Towns:

- Gaoqiao (高桥镇), Xinfeng (辛丰镇), Guyang (谷阳镇), Shangdang (上党镇), Baoyan (宝堰镇), Shiye (世业镇)

=== Jingkou District ===
Subdistricts:

- Zhengdong Road Subdistrict (正东路街道), Jiankang Road Subdistrict (健康路街道), Dashikou Subdistrict (大市口街道), Sipailou Subdistrict (四牌楼街道), Xiangshan Subdistrict (象山街道), Jianbi Subdistrict (谏壁街道), Dingmao Subdistrict (丁卯街道), Dagang Subdistrict (大港街道)

Towns: Yaoqiao (姚桥镇), Dalu (大路镇), Dinggang (丁岗镇)

=== Runzhou District ===
Subdistricts:

- Baota Road Subdistrict (宝塔路街道), Heping Road Subdistrict (和平路街道), Qilidian Subdistrict (七里甸街道), Jinshan Subdistrict (金山街道), Jiangqiao Subdistrict (蒋乔街道), Guantangqiao Subdistrict (官塘桥街道), Weigang Subdistrict (韦岗街道)

=== Danyang ===
Towns:

- Lingkou (陵口镇), Erling (珥陵镇), Fangxian (访仙镇), Situ (司徒镇), Yanling (延陵镇), Picheng (埤城镇), Xinqiao (新桥镇), Jiepai (界牌镇), Houxiang (后巷镇), Lücheng (吕城镇), Daoshu (导墅镇), Yunyang (云阳镇), Huangtang (皇塘镇)

Other:

- Danyang Economic and Technological Development Zone (丹阳经济技术开发区)

=== Jurong ===
Towns:

- Huayang (华阳镇), Baohua (宝华镇), Xiashu (下蜀镇), Baitu (白兔镇), Biancheng (边城镇)

Other:

- Jurong Economic Development Zone (句容市经济开发区)

=== Yangzhong ===
Towns:

- Xinba (新坝镇), Sanmao (三茅镇), Youfang (油坊镇), Baqiao (八桥镇), Xilaiqiao (西来桥镇)

Others:

- Yangzhong Economic Development Zone (扬中经济开发区), Yangzhong Fine Breeding Farm (扬中市良种繁育场), Yangzhong Pig Breeding Farm (扬中市种猪场), Yangzhong Fishery Cooperative (扬中市渔业社), Yangzhong Leigong Island Aquaculture Farm (扬中市雷公岛水产养殖场), Yangzhong Xisha Luliu Management Office (扬中市西沙芦柳管理所)

=== Zhenjiang New Area ===
Subdistricts:

- Dagang Subdistrict (大港街道), Dingmao Subdistrict (丁卯街道)

Towns:

- Dalu (大路镇), Yaoqiao (姚桥镇), Dinggang (丁岗镇)
