= Tong-Tai Mandarin =

Lower Yangtze Mandarin dialects

Tong-Tai
- Tai-Ru
- Region: eastern Jiangsu
- Speakers: 11.95 million (Tai-Ru) (2012)
- Language family: Sino-Tibetan: Sinitic; Chinese; Mandarin; Jianghuai; Tong-Tai

Language codes
- ISO 639-3: –
- Glottolog: None

Tong–Tai (Chinese: 通泰), also known as Tai–Ru (Chinese: 泰如), is a group of Lower Yangtze Mandarin dialects spoken in the east-central part of Jiangsu province in the prefecture-level cities of Nantong (formerly Tongzhou) and Taizhou. The alternative name refers to the county-level city of Rugao within Nantong. This region includes the areas which are to the north of Yangtze River and to the east of Grand Canal. There are about 11.37 million speakers there (in 2004) and this region occupies about 15,000 square kilometers.

This region can also be divided further into three districts: the west, the middle and the east. The west part includes Taizhou, Jiangyan, west of Hai'an, west of Dongtai, Dafeng, Xinghua, east of Jiangdu. The middle part includes Rugao, Rudong, Taixing, east of Dongtai, east of Hai'an and southwest of Jingjiang. The east part includes downtown of Nantong and southwest of Tongzhou. These vernaculars are distinguished by the difference in consonants.

However these districts used to be the region of the Wu culture, so there are many features of Wu Chinese in these vernaculars, especially the vernacular in the middle part, known as middle Tong-Tai dialect. It is closely bounded on the Changzhou part in the Wu region.

Conversely, Benjamin Ao argues that based on the aspiration of devoiced initials, the merger between the Middle Chinese velar nasal initial and glottal stop initial, and the merger/loss of glottal stop finals, the Tai-Tong dialects are most closely related to Huizhou Chinese rather than any other neighbouring grouping.

== Phonology ==
The Nantong variety will be taken as representative.

=== Consonants ===
Consonants of Nantong
		Labial	Alveolar	Alveolo- palatal	Post- alveolar	Velar	Glottal
Nasal		m	n			ŋ	
Plosive	aspirated	pʰ	tʰ			kʰ	
Plosive	unaspirated	p	t			k	ʔ
Affricate	aspirated		tsʰ	tɕʰ			
Affricate	unaspirated		ts	tɕ			
Fricative		f v	s	ɕ ʑ	ʃ	x	
Lateral approximant		w	l	j			

=== Vowels ===
r-colored ɜ: ɜ˞

tongue position for [ø] is slightly higher than the standard [ø], but lower than [y]

[ɛ] is slightly lower than the standard [ɛ], sounds close to [æ]

[ʌ] is higher than the standard [ʌ], close to [ɜ]

Tones

Dark level 阴平21 Light level 阳平35

(Light)Rising 上声（阳上）55

Light departing 阳去213 Dark departing 阴去42

Light entering 阳入55ʔ Dark entering 阴入42ʔ

== Dialects ==
=== Rugao dialect ===
The Rugaohua dialect of Jianghuai does not follow the T3 sandhi rule which most other Mandarin dialects follow. Linguists speculate that changes to pitch countours over time also removed the original motivation for T3 sandhi in the Beijing dialect underlying modern Standard Mandarin (putonghua), but the sandhi was retained.

When Chinese people were subjected to listening to various dialects such as Northern Mandarin (Yantai dialect), Standard Mandarin (Putonghua), and Jianghuai Mandarin (Rugao dialect of Jiangsu), "cross dialectal" differences appeared in their reactions.
