= Tianshan (disambiguation) =

Tian Shan or Tianshan is a mountain range in Central Asia.

Tianshan (天山) may also refer to the following in China:

- Tianshan District, Ürümqi, Xinjiang
- Tianshan Town, Ar Horqin Banner, Inner Mongolia
- Tianshan, Jiangsu, town in Gaoyou

== See also ==
- Tian Shan Pai (disambiguation)
