= Middle Tong-Tai dialect =

The Middle Tong-Tai dialect (Chinese: 通泰方言中区; pinyin: Tōng-Tài fāngyán zhōngqū) is a branch of the Tong-Tai dialect and is mainly used in the districts including Rugao, Rudong (excluding Binfang), Taixing, east of Dongtai, east of Hai'an and southwest of Jinhai, China. Although it is classified into the category of Jianghuai Mandarin, a communication barrier still exists between it and other dialects of Jianghuai Mandarin like the Yangzhou dialect. The reason could be that these areas are closely linked to the Wu region in history. For example, there is marked preservation of Wu Chinese features in vernaculars of Rudong. Thus, it can be seen as a dialect based on Wu, but later reformed by Jianghuai Mandarin, or as an interim zone between Wu and Jianghuai.
