= Hainan (disambiguation) =

Hainan is a province of the People's Republic of China.

Hainan may also refer to:

== Places in China ==
=== Other places in China ===
- Hainan Tibetan Autonomous Prefecture, Qinghai
- Hainan District, Wuhai, Inner Mongolia
- Hainan, Jiangsu, a town in Xinghua, Jiangsu

=== Townships ===
- Hainan Township, Hailun, Heilongjiang
- Hainan Korean Ethnic Township, Xi'an District, Mudanjiang, Heilongjiang
- Hainan Township, Sichuan, in Xichang, Sichuan

== Other uses ==
- Hainan Airlines, an airline based in Haikou, Hainan
- Hainan people, the indigenous people of Hainan province
- Hainan University, Haikou, Hainan
- Chinese landing helicopter dock Hainan, Chinese People's Liberation Army Navy ship

== See also ==
- Henan, a province in China
- Hunan, a province in China
- Haenam County, a county in South Korea
- Kainan, Wakayama, a city in Japan
