= Liu Yuan =

Liu Yuan or Liuyuan may refer to:

== People ==
- Liu Yuan (Han-Zhao) (died 310), Xiongnu leader who became the founding emperor of Former Han (Han Zhao)
- Liu Yuan (PRC general) (born 1951), general and politician of the People's Republic of China
- Liu Yuan (musician) (1960–2024), Chinese jazz musician
- Liu Yuan (boxer) (born 1979), Chinese boxer
- Liu Yuan (table tennis)

== Places in China ==
- Liuyuan, Gansu (柳园), town in Guazhou County, Gansu
- Liuyuan, Hebei (柳园), town in Linzhang County, Hebei
- Liuyuan, Shandong (榴园), town in Yicheng District, Zaozhuang, Shandong
- Liuyuan Township (流源乡), in Guidong County, Hunan
- Liuyuan Subdistrict, Shandong (柳园街道), in Dongchangfu District, Liaocheng, Shandong
- Liuyuan Subdistrict, Jiangsu, a township-level division of Gusu District, Suzhou, Jiangsu, China
- Lingering Garden (留園), a Chinese garden in Suzhou, Jiangsu
