= Yingyuehu Park station =

Wuxi Metro station

Coordinates: 31°35′18″N 120°26′40″E

Yingyuehu Park Station 映月湖公园
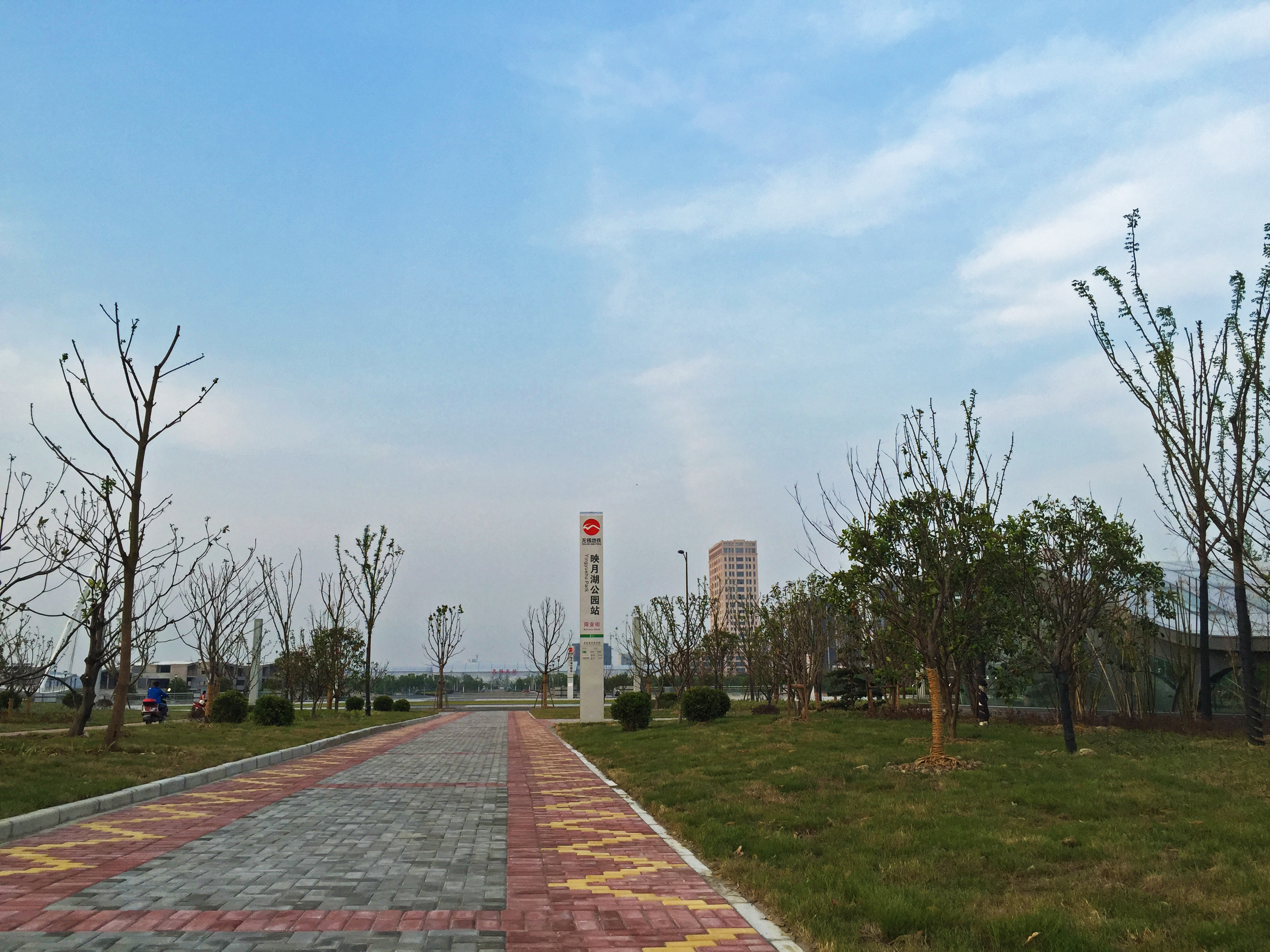
- Near the Entrance 4

General information
- Location: Xishan District, Wuxi, Jiangsu; China
- Operator: Wuxi Metro Corporation
- Lines: Line 2; Line 4 (under construction)
- Platforms: 2 (1 island platform)

Construction
- Structure type: Underground

History
- Opened: 28 April 2015

Services
Preceding station	Wuxi Metro	Following station
Zhaqiao towards Meiyuan Kaiyuan Temple	Line 2	Yingbin Square towards Wuxi East Railway Station
Location

Yingyuehu Park Station (Chinese: 映月湖公园站) is a metro station of Line 2 of the Wuxi Metro. It started operations on 28 April 2015. It will be the terminus of Line 4.

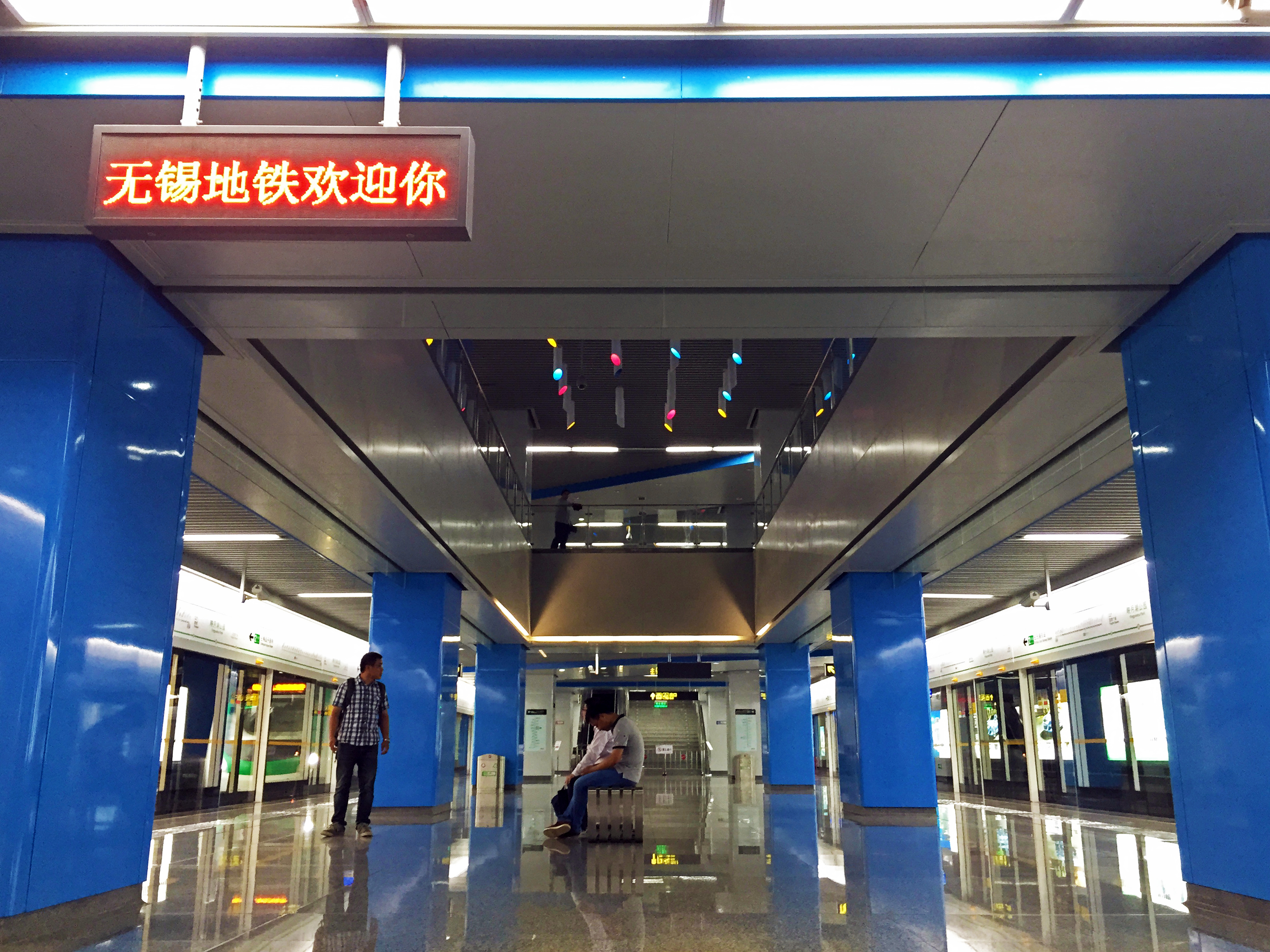
Platform

== Station layout ==
Ground
Ground	Exits

B1	Station Hall	Service Center, Ticket vending machine, Toilet, Elevator, Shops
B2	West	←█ towards Meiyuan Kaiyuan Temple
B2	Island Platform, doors will open on the left
B2	East	█ towards Anzhen→

B3	West	←█ towards Liutan
B3	Island Platform, doors will open on the left
B3	East	█ Terminus

== Exits ==
There are 4 exits for this station.
