= Dagong =

Dagong may refer to the following places and institutions in China:

- Dagong Global Credit Rating (Chinese: 大公; pinyin: dàgōng)
- Dalian University of Technology, Liaoning Province (Chinese: 大工; pinyin: dàgōng)
- Dagong, Jiangsu, a town in Hai'an County, Jiangsu, China
