= Xujiang Subdistrict =

Xujiang Subdistrict 胥江街道
- Subdistrict
- Location within Jiangsu Location within China
- Coordinates: 31.30069°N 120.6035°E
- Country: China
- Province: Jiangsu
- City: Suzhou
- District: Gusu District
- Time zone: UTC+8 (China Standard Time)

Xujiang Subdistrict (pinyin: Xūjiāng Jiēdào) is a former subdistrict of Gusu District, Suzhou, Jiangsu, China. The subdistrict was abolished on March 24, 2017 when it was merged into Canglang Subdistrict.

== Administrative divisions ==
As of 2016, shortly before its abolition, Xujiang Subdistrict administered 8 residential communities.

- Wannian Community (Chinese: 万年社区)
- Sanxiang Community (Chinese: 三香社区)
- Tainan Community (Chinese: 泰南社区)
- Xujiang Community (Chinese: 胥江社区)
- Xuhong Community (Chinese: 胥虹社区)
- Xincang Community (Chinese: 新沧社区)
- Tongjing First Community (Chinese: 潼泾一社区)
- Tongjing Second Community (Chinese: 潼泾二社区)

== See also ==
- Canglang Subdistrict
- List of township-level divisions of Suzhou
