= Chushui Experimental School =

School in Jiangsu, China

Chushui Experimental School (楚水实验学校) is located in Xinghua, Jiangsu province. It is an education modernization project demonstration and a four star high and junior school. It is surrounded by the ancient Zhaoyang city and the Canglang River with an area of more than 250 acres (more than 170,000 square meters). The school was established in 2000 with the development idea "high school building, high grade school, high efficiency management, high quality education". With 100 classes and 340 full-time teachers the school has 7,000 students on roll.

== The Environment ==
The beautiful environment and the quality service have made the ChuShui Experimental School become the preferred school for many locals. The school is surrounded by the ancient "Yangshan attractions" city and to the east, the Canglang River. Being located in the town center, convenient transportation, varieties of modern teaching facilities and all the modern conveniences are available. The campus is also equipped with computer network systems, a satellite network system for distance education, multimedia teaching and management systems and office automation, networking, management information, etc. The school has built several student apartments with dining rooms and bathrooms, equipped with guidance counselors, a logistics management and support system, and security departments.

== The teacher resources ==
The school endeavors to carry out a community-oriented plan of open recruitment of teachers and the implementation of a full employment under contract and elimination system. As a result, it has higher senior teachers as leaders to take control of the whole staff team. There are more than 340 full-time teachers, 63 senior teachers in middle school, 13 graduate students and two native-speaking English teachers in the school.
