= Fengmen Subdistrict =

Fengmen Subdistrict 葑门街道
- Subdistrict
- Location within Jiangsu Location within China
- Coordinates: 31.29772°N 120.64473°E
- Country: China
- Province: Jiangsu
- City: Suzhou
- District: Gusu District
- Time zone: UTC+8 (China Standard Time)

Fengmen Subdistrict (simplified Chinese: 葑门街道; traditional Chinese: 葑門街道; pinyin: Fēngmén Jiēdào) is a former subdistrict of Gusu District, Suzhou, Jiangsu, China. The subdistrict was abolished on March 24, 2017, when it was merged into Shuangta Subdistrict.

== Administrative divisions ==
In 2016, before its abolition, Fengmen Subdistrict administered the following 11 residential communities:

- Fengxi Community (Chinese: 葑溪社区)
- Changdao Community (Chinese: 长岛社区)
- Heng Street Community (Chinese: 横街社区)
- Hongfeng Community (Chinese: 宏葑社区)
- Yangzhi Community (Chinese: 杨枝社区)
- Midu Community (Chinese: 觅渡社区)
- Lihe Community (Chinese: 里河社区)
- Cuiyuan Community (Chinese: 翠园社区)
- Lianqing Community (Chinese: 联青社区)
- Xingxiu Community (Chinese: 杏秀社区)
- Chengwan Community (Chinese: 城湾社区)

== See also ==
- List of township-level divisions of Suzhou
- Shuangta Subdistrict
