= Liuyuan Subdistrict, Jiangsu =

Liuyuan Subdistrict 留园街道
- Subdistrict
- Location within Jiangsu Location within China
- Coordinates: 31.31729°N 120.57172°E
- Country: China
- Province: Jiangsu
- City: Suzhou
- District: Gusu District
- Time zone: UTC+8 (China Standard Time)

Liuyuan Subdistrict (simplified Chinese: 留园街道; traditional Chinese: 留園街道; pinyin: Liúyuán Jiēdào) is a former subdistrict of Gusu District, Suzhou, Jiangsu, China. The subdistrict was abolished on March 24, 2017 when it was merged into Huqiu Subdistrict.

== Administrative divisions ==
In 2016, before its abolition, Liuyuan Subdistrict administered the following 11 residential communities:

- Liuyuan Community (Chinese: 留园社区)
- Xiyuan Community (Chinese: 西园社区)
- Hutian Community (Chinese: 湖田社区)
- Ren'an Community (Chinese: 仁安社区)
- Boqian Road Community (Chinese: 玻纤路社区)
- Huqiu Road Community (Chinese: 虎丘路社区)
- Xinzhuang New Village Community (Chinese: 新庄新村社区)
- Shuofangzhuang Community (Chinese: 硕房庄社区)
- Guanjing Community (Chinese: 观景社区)
- Laiyun Community (Chinese: 来运社区)
- Jiaye Sunshine City Community (Chinese: 嘉业阳光城社区)

== See also ==
- Huqiu Subdistrict
- List of township-level divisions of Suzhou
