= Canglang Subdistrict =

Canglang Subdistrict 沧浪街道
- Subdistrict
- Location within Jiangsu Location within China
- Coordinates: 31.30347°N 120.61615°E
- Country: China
- Province: Jiangsu
- City: Suzhou
- District: Gusu District

Area
  - Total: 6.17 km^{2} (2.38 sq mi)

Population (2017)
  - Total: 80,111
  - Density: 13,000/km^{2} (33,600/sq mi)
- Time zone: UTC+8 (China Standard Time)

Canglang Subdistrict (Chinese: 沧浪街道) is a subdistrict of Gusu District, Suzhou, Jiangsu, China. The subdistrict spans an area of 6.17 square kilometres (2.38 mi^{2}), and has a population of 80,111 as of 2017.

== History ==
On March 24, 2017, the subdistrict of Xujiang Subdistrict was merged into Canglang Subdistrict.

== Administrative divisions ==
As of 2020, the subdistrict administers 21 residential communities.

- Guihua Community (Chinese: 桂花社区)
- Yulan Community (Chinese: 玉兰社区)
- Yangcanli First Community (Chinese: 养蚕里第一社区)
- Yangcanli Second Community (Chinese: 养蚕里第二社区)
- Zhuhui Community (Chinese: 竹辉社区)
- Ruiguang Community (Chinese: 瑞光社区)
- East Avenue Community (Chinese: 东大街社区)
- West Avenue Community (Chinese: 西大街社区)
- Jia'an Community (Chinese: 佳安社区)
- Jiqing Community (Chinese: 吉庆社区)
- Jinshi Community (Chinese: 金狮社区)
- Daoqian Community (Chinese: 道前社区)
- Ximei Community (Chinese: 西美社区)
- Wannian Community (Chinese: 万年社区)
- Sanxiang Community (Chinese: 三香社区)
- Tongjing First Community (Chinese: 潼泾一社区)
- Tongjing Second Community (Chinese: 潼泾二社区)
- Xincang Community (Chinese: 新沧社区)
- Xuhong Community (Chinese: 胥虹社区)
- Xujiang Community (Chinese: 胥江社区)
- Tainan Community (Chinese: 泰南社区)

== See also ==
- List of township-level divisions of Suzhou
- Xujiang Subdistrict
