= Duotian =

Division in Jiangsu, China

Duotian 垛田镇
- Town
- Location in Jiangsu
- Coordinates: 32°55′54″N 119°51′21″E
- Country: People's Republic of China
- Province: Jiangsu
- Prefecture-level city: Taizhou
- County-level city: Xinghua
- Time zone: UTC+8 (China Standard)

Duotian (Chinese: 垛田) is a township-level division situated in Xinghua, Jiangsu, China.

== See also ==
- List of township-level divisions of Jiangsu
