= Dainan =

Dainan 戴南镇
- Town
- Interactive map of Dainan
- Coordinates: 32°43′02″N 120°08′02″E
- Country: People's Republic of China
- Province: Jiangsu
- Prefecture-level city: Taizhou
- County-level city: Xinghua

Area
  - Total: 108 km^{2} (42 sq mi)

Population
  - Total: 93,000
  - Density: 860/km^{2} (2,200/sq mi)
- Time zone: UTC+8 (China Standard)

Dainan (Chinese: 戴南; pinyin: Dàinán) is a town under the administration of Xinghua City in east-central Jiangsu province, China. It has 4 residential communities (居委会) and 33 villages under its administration. The town is located in the southeast of Xinghua City, bordering Dongtai to the east and Jiangyan to the south, and has a population of 93,000 living in an area of 108 km^{2} (42 sq mi). Part of that area is known as the "cradle of stainless steel" (中国不锈钢之乡) production, and this economic activity gives rise to the nickname "No. 1 Town of Central Jiangsu" (苏中第一镇).
