= Baiyangwan Subdistrict =

Coordinates: 31.33796°N 120.55584°E

Baiyangwan Subdistrict 白洋湾街道
- Subdistrict
- Interactive map of Baiyangwan Subdistrict
- Country: China
- Province: Jiangsu
- City: Suzhou
- District: Gusu District
- Time zone: UTC+8 (China Standard Time)

Baiyangwan Subdistrict (Chinese: 白洋湾街道) is a township-level division of Gusu District, Suzhou, Jiangsu, China.

== See also ==
- List of township-level divisions of Suzhou
