= Shuangta Subdistrict, Suzhou =

Shuangta Subdistrict 双塔街道
- Subdistrict
- Location within Jiangsu Location within China
- Coordinates: 31.30356°N 120.62453°E
- Country: China
- Province: Jiangsu
- City: Suzhou
- District: Gusu District

Area
  - Total: 7.95 km^{2} (3.07 sq mi)

Population (2017)
  - Total: 93,778
  - Density: 11,800/km^{2} (30,600/sq mi)
- Time zone: UTC+8 (China Standard Time)

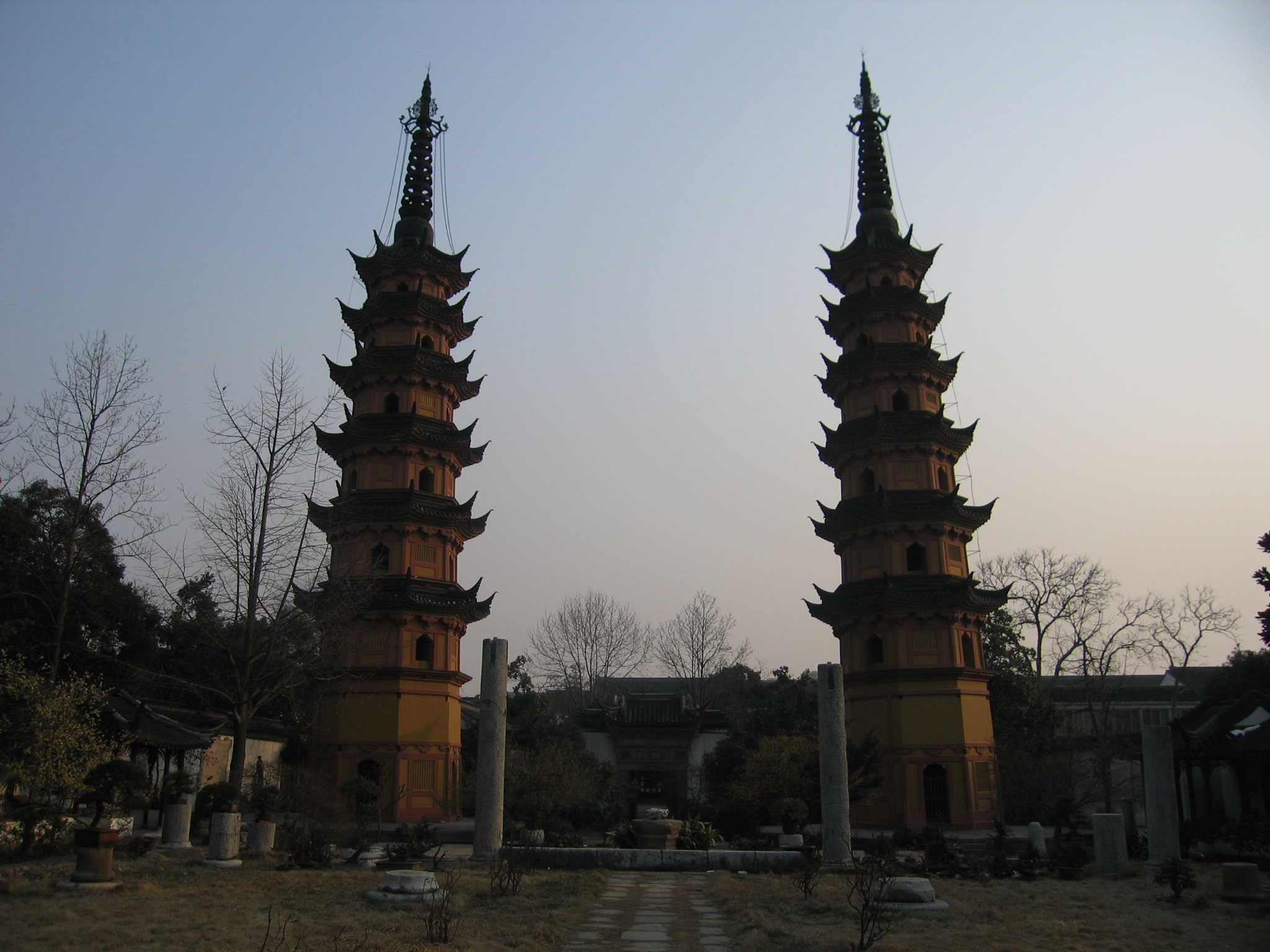
The Twin Pagodas in Suzhou's Old Town

Shuangta Subdistrict (simplified Chinese: 双塔街道; traditional Chinese: 雙塔街道; pinyin: Shuāngtǎ Jiēdào) is a township-level division of Gusu District, Suzhou, Jiangsu, China. The subdistrict spans an area of 7.95 square kilometres (3.07 mi^{2}), and a population of 93,778.

== History ==
On March 24, 2017, Fengmen Subdistrict was merged into Shuangta Subdistrict.

== Administrative divisions ==
As of 2020, Shuangta Subdistrict administers the following 21 residential communities:

- Baibu Street Community (Chinese: 百步街社区)
- Changdao Community (Chinese: 长岛社区)
- Canglangting Community (Chinese: 沧浪亭社区)
- Chengwan Community (Chinese: 城湾社区)
- Cuiyuan Community (Chinese: 翠园社区)
- Dagongyuan Community (Chinese: 大公园社区)
- Dinghuisixiang Community (Chinese: 定慧寺巷社区)
- Erlangxiang Community (Chinese: 二郎巷社区)
- Fengxi Community (Chinese: 葑溪社区)
- Gunxiufang Community (Chinese: 滚绣坊社区)
- Hongfeng Community (Chinese: 宏葑社区)
- Heng Street Community (Chinese: 横街社区)
- Jinfan Road Community (Chinese: 锦帆路社区)
- Lihe Community (Chinese: 里河社区)
- Lianqing Community (Chinese: 联青社区)
- Midu Community (Chinese: 觅渡社区)
- Tangjiaxiang Community (Chinese: 唐家巷社区)
- Wangshixiang Community (Chinese: 网师巷社区)
- Xingxiu Community (Chinese: 杏秀社区)
- Yangzhi Community (Chinese: 杨枝社区)
- Zhonglou Community (Chinese: 钟楼社区)

== See also ==
- Fengmen Subdistrict
- List of township-level divisions of Suzhou
