= Dalun, Jiangsu =

Dalun 大伦镇
- Town
- Location in Jiangsu Dalun (China)
- Coordinates: 32°26′22″N 120°15′03″E
- Country: People's Republic of China
- Province: Jiangsu
- Prefecture-level city: Taizhou
- District: Jiangyan
- Elevation: 5 m (16 ft)
- Time zone: UTC+8 (China Standard)
- Area code: 0523

Dalun (simplified Chinese: 大伦; traditional Chinese: 大倫; pinyin: Dàlún) is a town of Jiangyan District, Taizhou in south-central Jiangsu province, China. As of 2018, it has 2 residential communities (社区) and 16 villages under its administration.

== See also ==
- List of township-level divisions of Jiangsu
