= Xinghua Campaign =

1945 in the Chinese Civil War

- Part of the Chinese Civil War
| Date | August 29, 1945 – September 1, 1945 |
| Location | Xinghua, Jiangsu, China |
| Result | Communist victory |

Belligerents
| National Revolutionary Army | New Fourth Army |

Commanders and leaders
| Liu Xiangtu | unknown |

Strength
| 7,000 | 10,000 |

Casualties and losses
| 7,000 (2,000 killed) | 49 killed 325 wounded |

The Xinghua Campaign (兴化战役; also known as the Hinghwa Campaign) consisted of two battles fought between the Communist New Fourth Army and the nationalist forces of the Kuomintang. The campaign took place during the Chinese Civil War in the immediate post-World War II era, and resulted in a communist victory.

== Prelude ==
Like similar clashes following World War II between the communists and the nationalists in China, the Xinghua Campaign stemmed from Chiang Kai-shek's realization that his nationalist regime had neither sufficient troops nor adequate transportation to move his army into the Japanese-occupied regions of China. Chiang feared that the communists, who already dominated much of rural China, would further expand their territories by being the first Chinese faction to accept the official Japanese surrender, thus adding the regions occupied by Japan to the area controlled by the communists. Chiang Kai-shek ordered the Japanese and their wartime puppet regime not to surrender to the communists, and furthermore to quell unrest and fight off the communists until the eventual arrival of the nationalist troops.

One result of the Xinghua Campaign was that most of the members of the Japanese-installed puppet regime rejoined the nationalists, whom they had deserted following the earlier Japanese victory over the nationalist army. These former nationalists consisted mostly of Chinese warlords and their private armies, only nominally under Chiang Kai-shek's control before and after World War II. The warlords felt no loyalty to a cause greater than their own, and had defected to the Japanese side when Japanese invaders offered to let them keep some of their former power in exchange for their collaboration.

Although the warlords' lack of loyalty and independence from the nationalist power structure posed a great threat to Chiang, he recognised that they needed to be handled with delicacy. Moving against the warlords would alienate other factions within the nationalist ranks and would deprive Chiang of soldiers who could garrison nationalist territory. These manned garrisons would allow Chiang's own troops to fight the communists.

=== The Nationalists' Strategy ===
In accordance with his strategy to simultaneously solve the warlord problem that had plagued China for so long and exterminate communism, Chiang Kai-shek and his followers had hoped that these former Japanese puppet regime's warlords who rejoined the nationalists would be able to hold on to the regions long enough for Chiang to deploy his own troops to hold off the communists. If the communists were victorious in such conflicts, however, the result would still benefit to Chiang and China because the power of these warlords would be reduced as their military forces were smashed by the communists, and the warlord problem that plagued China for so long could thus be greatly reduced; at the same time, communists would be weakened by the fights, and Chiang's own troops would have an easier time taking control.

=== Warlord armies' honor ===
The former nationalist forces had no problem following Chiang Kai-shek's orders, as they were eager to prove themselves. These warlords and their troops were well aware that due to their collaboration with the Japanese invaders during the Second Sino-Japanese War, they were very hated by China's general population, especially by those nationalists who had refused to surrender to the enemy and had fought the enemy until the eventual victory. The warlords and their armies would certainly be disarmed and discharged, at best, and possibly eliminated. Thus, they saw Chiang Kai-shek's order for them to fight the communists as a way for them to legitimize themselves and retain their power.

=== Communists' strategy ===
The communists' strategy was much simpler than that of the nationalists because there were no significant division within the communist ranks, as there were with the nationalist ranks. The communists had already earned considerable popular support by being the only remaining regional Chinese force to continue fighting the Japanese invaders and their puppet regime after the nationalists withdrew. Further, because the communist-established bases in rural regions were more prosperous, compared to those of Japanese-occupied regions, the general Chinese populace agreed that the communists better deserved to represent China and to regain control over the regions formerly occupied by the invaders.

== Campaign ==
Chiang Kai-shek allowed the former nationalists to rejoin his army. The former nationalists were given the instruction to fight the communists until the arrival of Chiang's troops. The city of Xinghua, located in central Jiangsu, was guarded by the nationalists. The Japanese puppet regime force rejoined the nationalists, totaling more than 7,000, including the 22nd Division and local security regiments. The communist New Fourth Army was determined to take the city, and amassed units from the communists' Central Jiangsu Military District.

The communist units began to enter the positions for attack starting on August 26, 1945, and were ready two days later. On August 29, the first battle of the campaign began. The communists started to take nationalist positions along the outskirts of the city. The defenders were soon forced to abandon their strongholds outside the city wall and retreat into the city. At 8:00 pm on August 31, the assault on the city itself began, and under cover from mountain guns, the communists soon breached the city's defenses and penetrated the city. By the end of the following day, after fierce street fighting, the city fell into communist hands, concluding the Xinghua campaign.

The entire nationalist garrison of Xinghua was decimated. Out of the 7,000 defenders, around 2,000 were killed. The remaining 5,000, were captured alive, including the commander of the city's defense and of the Kuomintang's 22nd division. Also captured were 64 artillery units, 122 machine guns, and 3,324 repeating rifles, in addition to other weaponry and provisions. The communists' loss was extremely light in comparison: only 49 killed, and 325 wounded, including 40 officers wounded.

== Outcome ==
Like other similar clashes immediately after the end of World War II between the communists and the nationalists in China, this conflict showed that Chiang Kai-shek's attempt to simultaneously solve China's long-standing warlord problem and to exterminate communism proved to be a critical mistake. Although the result of the campaign turned out exactly like Chiang Kai-shek and his subordinates had predicted, reducing the power of the warlords in the region, the positive impact of any secondary objectives were negated by the loss of primary ones. The people of the region had already blamed the nationalists for the previous loss to the Japanese invaders, and the reassignment of the former nationalist forces to fight the communists only further alienated the local populace and strengthened popular resentment of Chiang Kai-shek and his nationalist regime.

== See also ==
- Outline of the Chinese Civil War
- National Revolutionary Army
- History of the People's Liberation Army
