= Xinduo =

Township-level division of Jiangsu, China

Xinduo 新垛镇
- Town
- Location in Jiangsu
- Coordinates: 33°05′19″N 120°10′53″E
- Country: People's Republic of China
- Province: Jiangsu
- Prefecture-level city: Taizhou
- County-level city: Xinghua
- Time zone: UTC+8 (China Standard)

Xinduo (Chinese: 新垛) is a township-level division in Xinghua, Jiangsu, China.

== See also ==
- List of township-level divisions of Jiangsu
