= Zhoutie =

Town in Yixing, China

Zhoutie 周铁镇
- Town
- Location in Jiangsu
- Coordinates: 31°26′12″N 119°59′57″E
- Country: People's Republic of China
- Province: Jiangsu
- Prefecture-level city: Wuxi
- County-level city: Yixing
- Time zone: UTC+8 (China Standard)

Zhoutie Town (simplified Chinese: 周铁镇; traditional Chinese: 周鐵鎮; pinyin: Zhōutiě Zhèn) is a town in Yixing, Wuxi, Jiangsu, to the west of Lake Taihu (太湖), China.

== See also ==
- List of township-level divisions of Jiangsu
