= Yangjian =

Yangjian 羊尖镇
- Town
- Location in Jiangsu Yangjian (China)
- Coordinates (Town government): 31°37′25″N 120°33′13″E
- Country: People's Republic of China
- Province: Jiangsu
- Prefecture-level city: Wuxi
- District: Xishan
- Time zone: UTC+8 (China Standard)

Yangjian (Chinese: 羊尖; pinyin: Yángjiān) is a town in Xishan District, Wuxi, Jiangsu, China. As of 2020, it administers Yangjian Residential Neighborhood and the following eight villages:

- Yangjian Village
- Nan Village (南村)
- Wanshan Village (宛山村)
- Langxia Village (廊下村)
- Nanfeng Village (南丰村)
- Yanjiaqiao Village (严家桥村)
- Li'an Village (丽安村)
- Longfengxiang Village (龙凤巷村)

== See also ==
- List of township-level divisions of Jiangsu
