= Dagang, Yancheng =

Dagang, Yancheng 大冈
- Town
- Location in Jiangsu Province Location in China
- Coordinates: 33.1890°N 120.1046°E
- Country: China
- Province: Jiangsu
- City: Yancheng
- District: Yandu

Dagang (Chinese: 大冈; pinyin: Dàgāng) is a town in Yandu District, Yancheng, Jiangsu Province, China. Founded during the Neolithic Age, Dagang was named after a huge sandy hill (Chinese: 沙岗之巨: "巨" in Chinese means large and the two characters gang 岗 (hill) and 冈 are homophonous).

== Geography ==
Dagang is located to the south of the downtown area of Yancheng (Chinese: 盐城), bordering Xinghua (Chinese: 兴化), Dafeng and Tinghu District. After the incorporation of Gangzhong (Chinese: 冈中) into Dagang in June, 2001, the town grew to a total area of 130.71 square kilometers, with approximately 88,400 residents. It has a flat terrain, a dense river network and fertile soil. The climate features four distinct seasons and abundant rainfall.

== Culture ==
According to oral history, there has been commercial activity in Dagang throughout the Yuan, Ming and Qing dynasties. Cooperage and shoemaking were prominent industries. Traditional crafts of shoemaking such as embroidered tiger shoes and embroidery cotton-padded shoes have been maintained up to the present day. There is a fair every five days. In Dagang, there are some historical sites like Wolong Bridge (Chinese: 卧龙桥), Boots Ditch (Chinese: 靴子沟) and Dayun Mountain Temple (Chinese: 大云山寺). Today the old streets of Dagang still retain examples of traditional architecture, such as slab stone bridges and houses built of old blue bricks and tile.

== Economy ==
Dagang mainly manufactures machines for shoemaking at present. It has established a "Shoemaking Hub" and is known as "China's Shoemaking Machinery Capital." The famous sociologist Fei Xiaotong, the vice-chairman of the Standing Committee of the National People's Congress, visited Dagang twice and provided the calligraphy for the inscription: "Yancheng's Shoemaking Machines Shall Conquer the World."

== Honors ==
Dagang Town has earned the following distinctions:

- (2002)
- Province key towns (2006)
- Province Town of Health (2009)
- Shoemaking Industry Base (2009)
- Innovative Town (2010)

== See also ==
- Yuan dynasty
- Economy of the Ming dynasty
- Qing dynasty
- Economic history of China until 1912
