= Touzao =

Touzao 头灶镇
- Town
- Location in Jiangsu Touzao (China)
- Coordinates: 32°53′14″N 120°33′08″E
- Country: People's Republic of China
- Province: Jiangsu
- Prefecture-level city: Yancheng
- County-level city: Dongtai
- Time zone: UTC+8 (China Standard)
- Postal code: 224200
- Area code: 0515

Touzao (simplified Chinese: 头灶; traditional Chinese: 頭灶; pinyin: Tóuzào) is a town of eastern Jiangsu province, People's Republic of China, lying on the roadside of Jiangsu Provincial Highway 333 (or S333). It is located nearly due east and under the administration of Dongtai City, and has a population of about 50,000, residing in six residential communities (社区) and 23 villages.
