= Hechen =

Hechen 合陈镇
- Town
- Interactive map of Hechen
- Coordinates: 33°00′24″N 120°14′24″E
- Country: People's Republic of China
- Province: Jiangsu
- Prefecture-level city: Taizhou
- County-level city: Xinghua
- Time zone: UTC+8 (China Standard)
- Postal code: 225743

Hechen (simplified Chinese: 合陈; traditional Chinese: 合陳; pinyin: Héchén) is a town located in the east of Xinghua City in east-central Jiangsu province. The area has approximately 60,000 inhabitants spread over 16,200 households. The town is an old revolutionary base and was the location of many well-known battles. The flat terrain, fertile soil, spaced water network, superior ecological environment and rich natural resources have made the town relatively prosperous.

== Agriculture ==
Xinghua is a national grain county, and Hechen is the “granary” of Xinghua city. In Hechen, people focus on planting rice, wheat, oilseed and cotton. It is also riched in fish and poultry, such as rabbits, chickens, ducks, geese, pigs, and sheep. Approximately 400,000 poultry are produced annually, and about 150,000 pigs.

== Industrial development ==
In recent years, Hechen has planned to establish 2000 acres of industrial parks in the town and has developed a number of preferential policies to create a favorable investment environment and attract a group of investors from Shanghai, Zhejiang and Yancheng. The aim is to strengthen investment and the development of industrial economy while still paying attention to agricultural production. The town's industrial economy has increased at a 40% rate.

== Administrative divisions ==
There is one residential community and 27 villages under the town's administration:

Residential community: Minjian (民建社区)

Villages:

- Hechen (合陈村)
- Pozhai (卜寨村)
- Shengli (胜利村)
- Donglianhe (东联合村)
- Dongxiangyang (东向阳村)
- Fengcun (凤存村)
- Jinxian (锦贤村)
- Jiepai (界牌村)
- Louzi (娄子村)
- Zhuchen (朱陈村)
- Zhutian (朱甜村)
- Luqian (陆谦村)
- Hongqi (红旗村)
- Lixiu (李秀村)
- Jiuligang (九里港村)
- Gaojia (高桂村)
- Xugang (许港村)
- Wanshen (万沈村)
- Guishan (桂山村)
- Fanxi (樊奚村)
- Zhangju (张居村)
- Zhengsun (征孙村)
- Tagang (塔港村)
- Qiqiao (邓桥村)
- Chengzhang (成章村)
- Xingfu (幸福村)
- Ganyang (甘杨村)

== Transport ==
There are many methods of transport to and from Hechen, including the Tongyu Canal, the Chuanchang river, the 204 State Road, the Yan Jing Ning Expressway and the nearby Xinghua railway station.
