= Shigang =

Shigang could refer to:

- Shigang Chen, computer scientist at the University of Florida
- Shigang District (Chinese: 石岡區), a district in Taichung City, Taiwan

- Shigang Dam (Chinese: 石岡壩), a dam in Shigang and Dongshi districts, Taichung City, Taiwan

- Shigang station (Chinese: 施岗站), a train station in Wuhan, Hubei, China
- Shigang Subdistrict (Chinese: 石岗大街街道), a subdistrict in Xinhua District, Shijiazhuang, Hebei, China
