= Huqiu Subdistrict =

Coordinates: 31.32668°N 120.57638°E

Huqiu Subdistrict 虎丘街道
- Subdistrict
- Interactive map of Huqiu Subdistrict
- Country: China
- Province: Jiangsu
- City: Suzhou
- District: Gusu District
- Time zone: UTC+8 (China Standard Time)

Huqiu Subdistrict (Chinese: 虎丘街道) is a township-level division of Gusu District, Suzhou, Jiangsu, China.

== See also ==
- List of township-level divisions of Suzhou
