= Xishan, Wuxi =

Xishan 锡山区
- District
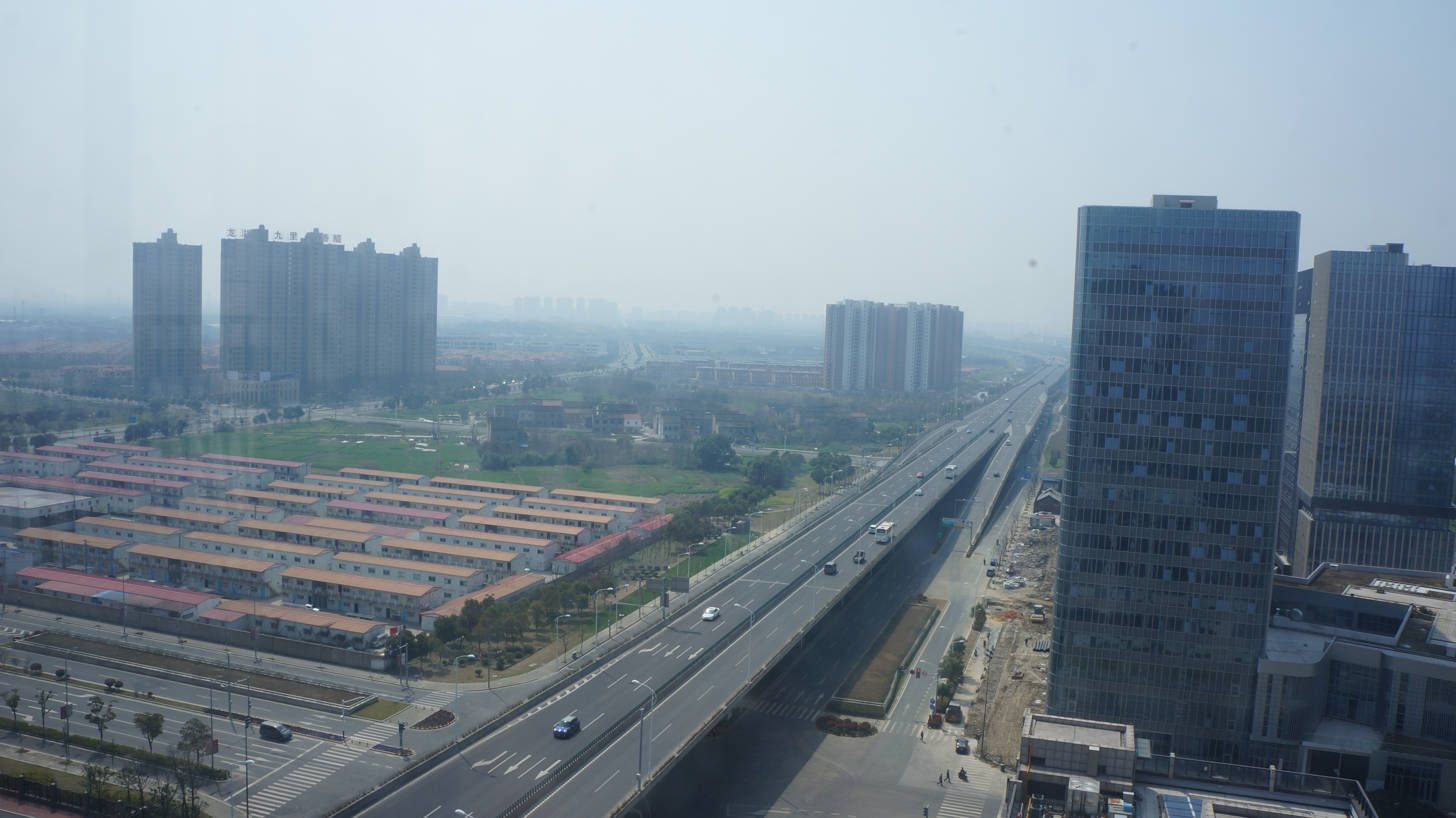
- Xidong New Town

- Location in Jiangsu
- Coordinates: 31°35′32″N 120°27′36″E
- Country: People's Republic of China
- Province: Jiangsu
- Prefecture-level city: Wuxi

Area
  - District: 399 km^{2} (154 sq mi)

Population (2020 census)
  - District: 882,387
  - Density: 2,210/km^{2} (5,730/sq mi)
  - Urban: 769,067
  - Rural: 113,320
- Time zone: UTC+8 (China Standard)
- Postal Code: 214101

Xishan District (simplified Chinese: 锡山区; traditional Chinese: 錫山區; pinyin: Xīshān Qū) is one of five urban districts of Wuxi, Jiangsu Province, People's Republic of China.

With a total area of 454 km^{2} (175 sq mi), the district's 2020 population was 882,387.

== Administrative divisions ==
At present, Xishan District has 4 subdistricts and 4 towns.

4 subdistricts

- Dongting (东亭街道)
- Dongbeitang (东北塘街道)
- Anzhen (安镇街道)
- Mashan (马山街道)

4 towns

- Yangjian (羊尖镇)
- Ehu (鹅湖镇)
- Xibei (锡北镇)
- Donggang (东港镇)

== Notable people ==
- An Guo, scholar, inventor, and publisher during Ming Dynasty.
