= Hainan, Jiangsu =

Hainan 海南镇
- Town
- Location in Jiangsu
- Coordinates: 33°2′34″N 119°59′0″E
- Country: People's Republic of China
- Province: Jiangsu
- Prefecture-level city: Taizhou
- County-level city: Xinghua
- Time zone: UTC+8 (China Standard)

Hainan (Chinese: 海南; pinyin: Hǎinán) is a town under the administration of Xinghua, in central Jiangsu, China. As of 2018, it has one residential community and 18 villages under its administration.
