= Tian Shan Pai =

Tian Shan Pai or Tianshan Pai may refer to:

- Mount Heaven Sect, a fictional martial arts school featured in wuxia fiction
- Tien Shan Pai, a martial arts school unrelated to the fictional one
