= Haifu =

Chinese medical device manufacturer

Chongqing Haifu (HIFU) Technology Co., Ltd.
- Industry: Medical equipment manufacturing
- Founded: 1999
- Headquarters: Chongqing, People's Republic of China
- Website: http://www.haifu.com.cn

Haifu (Chinese: 海扶; pinyin: hǎi fǘ) is a company founded in 1999 and headquartered in Chongqing, China, which is a leading manufacturer of non-invasive ultrasound therapeutic systems for both malignant and benign tumors.

In October 2005, the National Engineering Research Center of Ultrasound Medicine was built in Haifu. China's Development and Reform Commission planned to create top 10 national engineering research centers in 10 key fields. The one in Haifu is the only one in the digital medical device field.

Haifu is a medical device manufacturer, producing high-intensity focused ultrasound (HIFU) equipment. The HIFU machines produced are CE certified. The company sells in foreign markets and was noted in a China Daily article as an example of Chinese businesses manufacturing goods of higher sophistication for the international market.

The company exported a HIFU unit to Oxford University Hospitals NHS Trust (Churchill Hospital) in 2002. The installed base for the product includes 24 medical institutions in 14 countries.
