= Hainan Township, Hailun =

Hainan Township 海南乡
- Township
- Location in Heilongjiang Hainan Township (China)
- Coordinates: 47°13′55″N 126°58′53″E
- Country: People's Republic of China
- Province: Heilongjiang
- Prefecture-level city: Suihua
- County-level city: Hailun
- Time zone: UTC+8 (China Standard)

Hainan Township (simplified Chinese: 海南乡; traditional Chinese: 海南鄉; pinyin: Hǎinán Xiāng) is a township under the administration of Hailun, in Heilongjiang, China. As of 2018, it has 10 villages under its administration.
