= Dagong, Jiangsu =

Dagong 大公镇
- Town
- Location in Jiangsu Dagong (China)
- Coordinates: 32°36′54″N 120°30′50″E
- Country: People's Republic of China
- Province: Jiangsu
- Prefecture-level city: Nantong
- County-level city: Hai'an
- Time zone: UTC+8 (China Standard)

Dagong (Chinese: 大公; pinyin: Dàgōng) is a town in Hai'an in Jiangsu province, China. As of 2018, it has three residential communities and 12 villages under its administration.

== See also ==
- List of township-level divisions of Jiangsu
