= Xinghua, Jiangsu =

City in Jiangsu, China

Xinghua 兴化市 Hinghwa
- County-level city
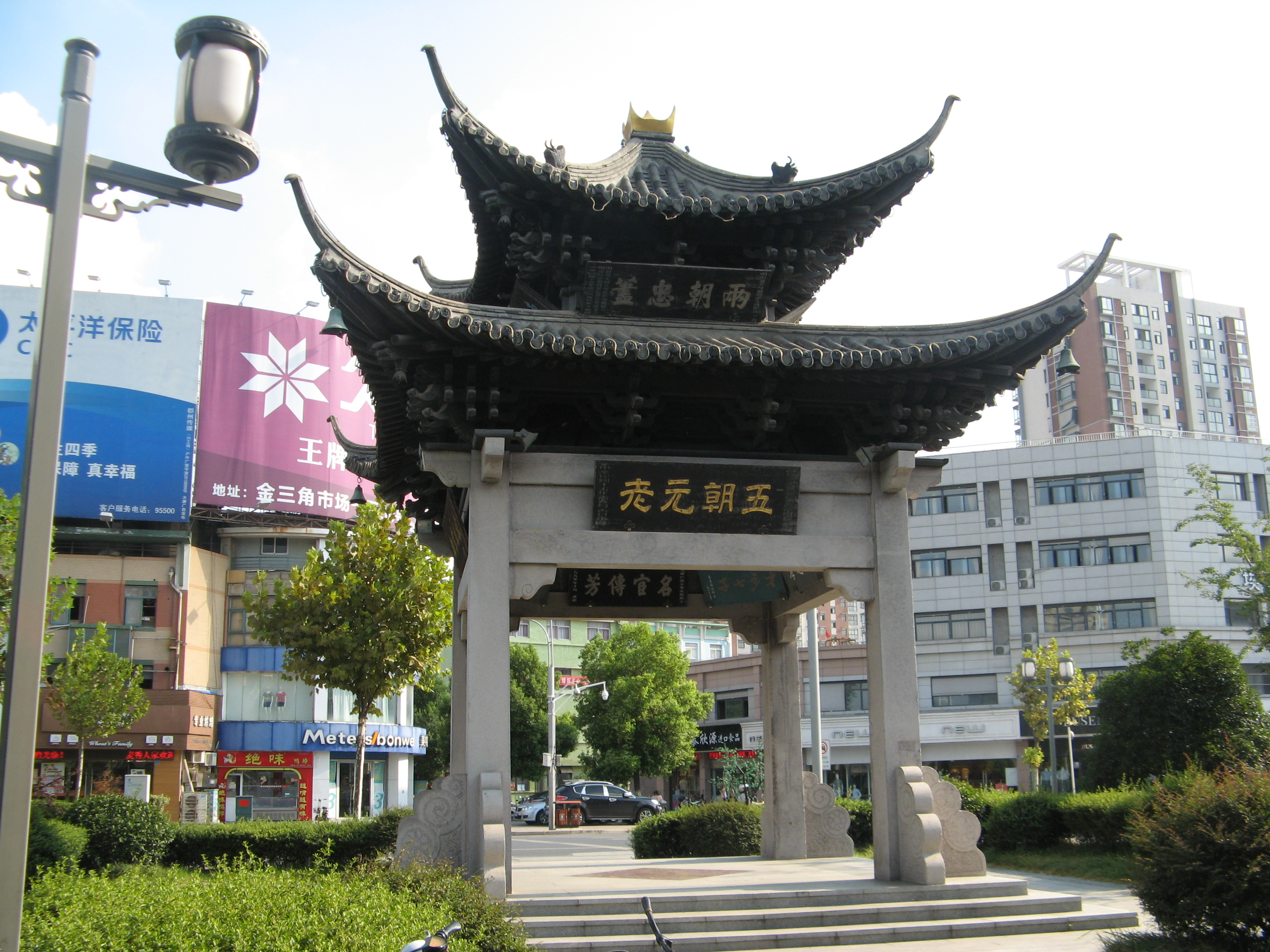
- Sipai Tower (四牌楼; 四牌樓), the emblem of the Xinghua Ancient City (兴化古城; 興化古城)

- Location of the city center in Jiangsu
- Coordinates: 32°54′43″N 119°51′09″E
- Country: People's Republic of China
- Province: Jiangsu
- Prefecture-level city: Taizhou

Area
  - Total: 2,393.35 km^{2} (924.08 sq mi)

Population (2019)
  - Total: 1,542,600
  - Density: 644.54/km^{2} (1,669.3/sq mi)
- Time zone: UTC+8 (China Standard)
- Postal code: 225700

Xinghua (simplified Chinese: 兴化; traditional Chinese: 興化; pinyin: Xīnghuà) is a county-level city under the administration of Taizhou, Jiangsu province, China. It is located in the central part of Jiangsu Province. It borders the prefecture-level cities of Yancheng to the north and east and Yangzhou to the west.

Xinghua's name (兴化) is the abbreviation for "兴盛教化" (xīngshèng jiàohuà) which means "prospering (the Confucian) teaching".

== History ==
In 920, the Yang Wu state of the Ten Kingdoms separated the northern part of the then Hailing county to establish Xinghua county. The county was downgraded to Zhaoyang township in 1135, but was restored in 1149.

In 1987, the county was turned into a city of Yangzhou. The area was under the jurisdiction of Yangzhou until 1996, and then reassign to Taizhou, Jiangsu.

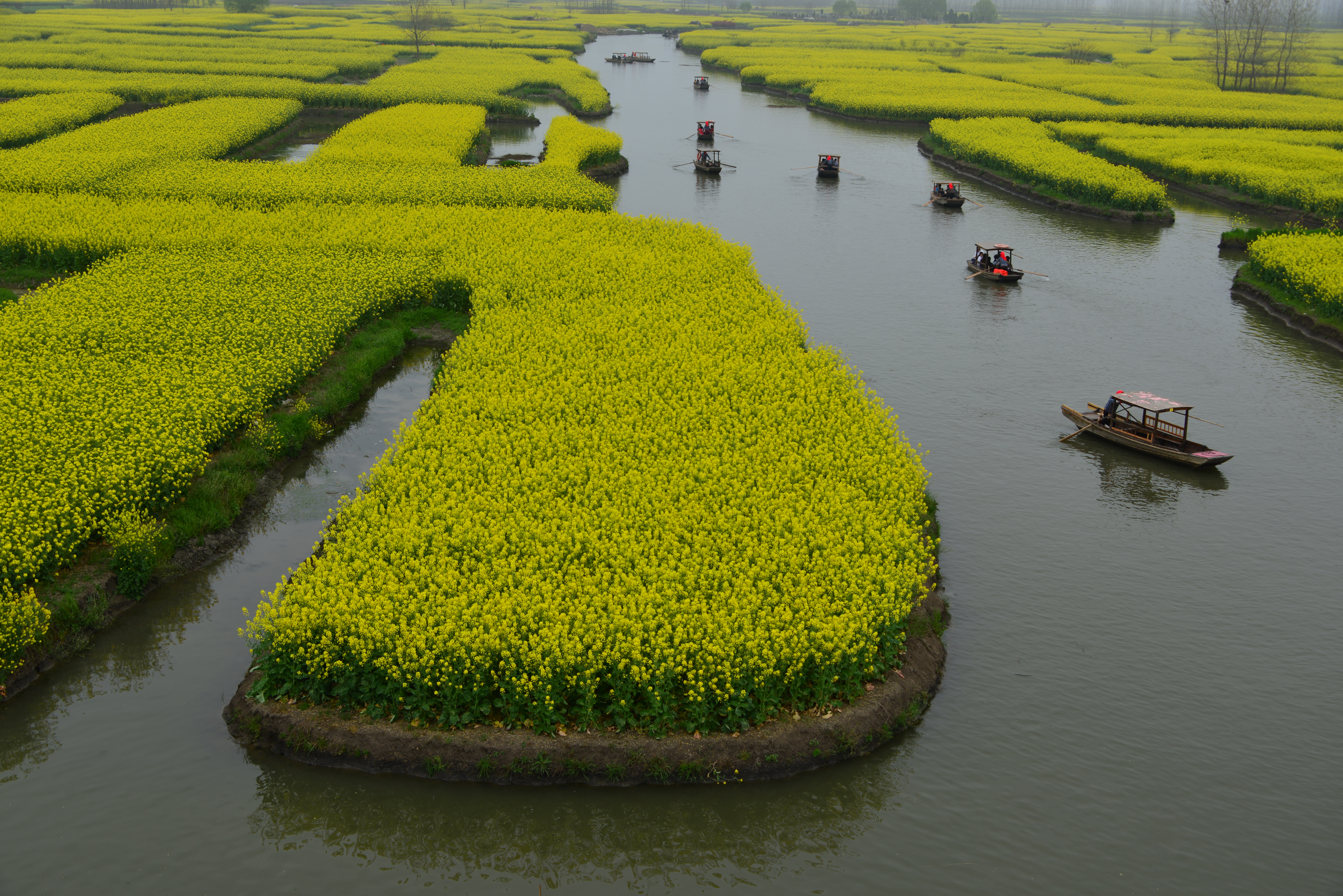
Canola field on water

== Administrative divisions ==
At present, Xinghua City has 29 towns and 5 townships.

29 towns

- Daiyao (戴窑镇)
- Hechen (合陈镇)
- Yongfeng (永丰镇)
- Xinduo (新垛镇)
- Anfeng (安丰镇)
- Hainan (海南镇)
- Diaoyu (钓鱼镇)
- Dazou (大邹镇)
- Shagou (沙沟镇)
- Zhongbao (中堡镇)
- Lizhong (李中镇)
- Xijiao (西郊镇)
- Lincheng (临城镇)
- Duotian (垛田镇)
- Zhuhong (竹泓镇)
- Shenlun (沈伦镇)
- Daduo (大垛镇)
- Huoduo (荻垛镇)
- Taozhuang (陶庄镇)
- Changrong (昌荣镇)
- Maoshan (茅山镇)
- Zhouzhuang (周庄镇)
- Chenbao (陈堡镇)
- Dainan (戴南镇)
- Zhangguo (张郭镇)
- Zhaoyang (昭阳镇)
- Daying (大营镇)
- Xiaxu (下圩镇)
- Chengdong (城东镇)

5 townships

- Laowei (老圩乡)
- Zhoufen (周奋乡)
- Ganggu (缸顾乡)
- Xibao (西鲍乡)
- Linhu (林湖乡)

== Climate ==
Climate data for Xinghua, elevation 3 m (9.8 ft), (1991–2020 normals, extremes 1981–present)
| Month | Jan | Feb | Mar | Apr | May | Jun | Jul | Aug | Sep | Oct | Nov | Dec | Year |
|---|---|---|---|---|---|---|---|---|---|---|---|---|---|
| Record high °C (°F) | 19.4 (66.9) | 25.3 (77.5) | 33.6 (92.5) | 32.6 (90.7) | 35.8 (96.4) | 36.8 (98.2) | 37.8 (100.0) | 39.7 (103.5) | 36.1 (97.0) | 31.5 (88.7) | 28.0 (82.4) | 21.3 (70.3) | 39.7 (103.5) |
| Mean daily maximum °C (°F) | 6.5 (43.7) | 9.0 (48.2) | 13.9 (57.0) | 20.2 (68.4) | 25.6 (78.1) | 28.8 (83.8) | 31.5 (88.7) | 31.0 (87.8) | 27.2 (81.0) | 22.3 (72.1) | 15.7 (60.3) | 9.0 (48.2) | 20.1 (68.1) |
| Daily mean °C (°F) | 2.4 (36.3) | 4.6 (40.3) | 9.0 (48.2) | 15.0 (59.0) | 20.5 (68.9) | 24.4 (75.9) | 27.8 (82.0) | 27.4 (81.3) | 23.2 (73.8) | 17.7 (63.9) | 11.2 (52.2) | 4.7 (40.5) | 15.7 (60.2) |
| Mean daily minimum °C (°F) | −0.7 (30.7) | 1.1 (34.0) | 5.2 (41.4) | 10.6 (51.1) | 16.2 (61.2) | 20.9 (69.6) | 24.8 (76.6) | 24.6 (76.3) | 20.0 (68.0) | 14.0 (57.2) | 7.6 (45.7) | 1.3 (34.3) | 12.1 (53.8) |
| Record low °C (°F) | −10.0 (14.0) | −10.4 (13.3) | −7.4 (18.7) | 0.3 (32.5) | 7.1 (44.8) | 12.7 (54.9) | 17.6 (63.7) | 17.7 (63.9) | 10.6 (51.1) | 2.4 (36.3) | −4.6 (23.7) | −10.3 (13.5) | −10.4 (13.3) |
| Average precipitation mm (inches) | 39.8 (1.57) | 38.8 (1.53) | 64.8 (2.55) | 62.6 (2.46) | 82.8 (3.26) | 166.6 (6.56) | 234.0 (9.21) | 177.6 (6.99) | 78.2 (3.08) | 53.2 (2.09) | 54.3 (2.14) | 32.6 (1.28) | 1,085.3 (42.72) |
| Average precipitation days (≥ 0.1 mm) | 7.6 | 7.7 | 8.8 | 7.9 | 9.7 | 9.6 | 12.7 | 12.0 | 8.1 | 7.0 | 7.4 | 6.1 | 104.6 |
| Average snowy days | 2.9 | 2.3 | 1.0 | 0 | 0 | 0 | 0 | 0 | 0 | 0 | 0.4 | 0.8 | 7.4 |
| Average relative humidity (%) | 73 | 73 | 71 | 70 | 71 | 75 | 80 | 81 | 77 | 73 | 74 | 72 | 74 |
| Mean monthly sunshine hours | 145.7 | 143.5 | 172.6 | 197.0 | 203.4 | 167.5 | 193.0 | 203.9 | 184.7 | 184.9 | 158.0 | 156.3 | 2,110.5 |
| Percentage possible sunshine | 46 | 46 | 46 | 50 | 47 | 39 | 45 | 50 | 50 | 53 | 51 | 51 | 48 |
Source: China Meteorological Administration all-time extreme temperature all-time January high

== Education ==
- Chushui Experimental School

== Notable people ==
- Bi Feiyu, fiction writer
- Fan Zhongyan, politician, was once magistrate in Xinghua
- Hou Yifan, chess grandmaster, born in Xinghua
- Kong Shangren, Qing dynasty dramatist and poet
- Li Jitong (1897–1961), botanist and phytophysiologist
- Zheng Banqiao, Qing dynasty painter

== See also ==
- Xinghua Campaign
