= Tianshan, Jiangsu =

Town in Gaoyou, Jiangsu, China

Tianshan 天山镇
- Town
- Location in Jiangsu
- Coordinates: 32°37′49″N 119°14′51″E
- Country: People's Republic of China
- Province: Jiangsu
- Prefecture-level city: Yangzhou
- County-level city: Gaoyou
- Time zone: UTC+8 (China Standard)

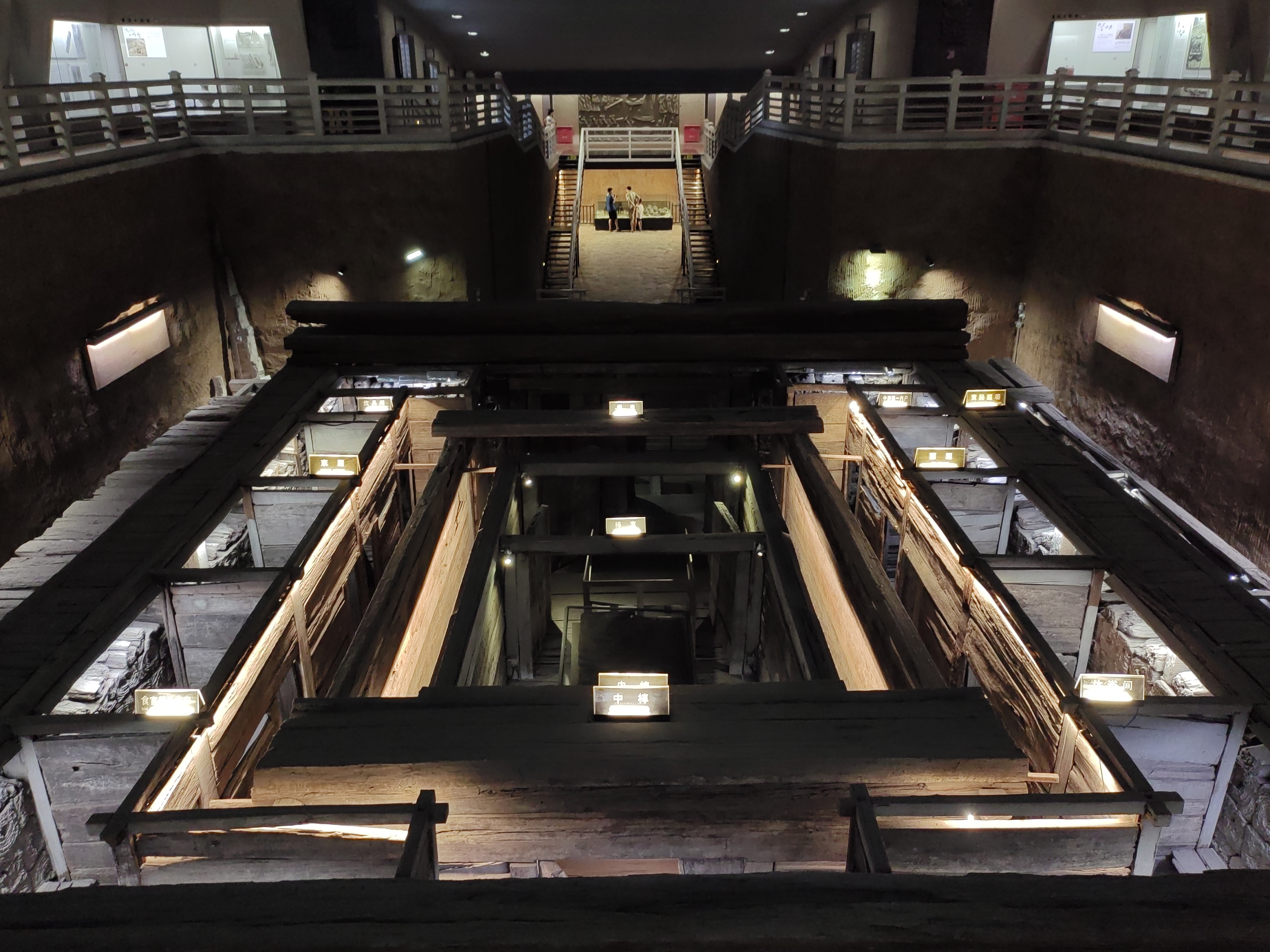
The tomb of Liu Xu, the Han Guangling King, reconstructed in the Han Guangling Royal Tomb Museum in Yangzhou

Tianshan Town (Chinese: 天山镇; pinyin: Tiānshān zhèn) is a town in Gaoyou County-level city, which in its turn is part of Yangzhou Prefecture-level city, in China's Jiangsu Province.

The town is located about 30 km southwest (straight-line distance) from Gaoyou central city, and about the same distance northwest from downtown Yangzhou.

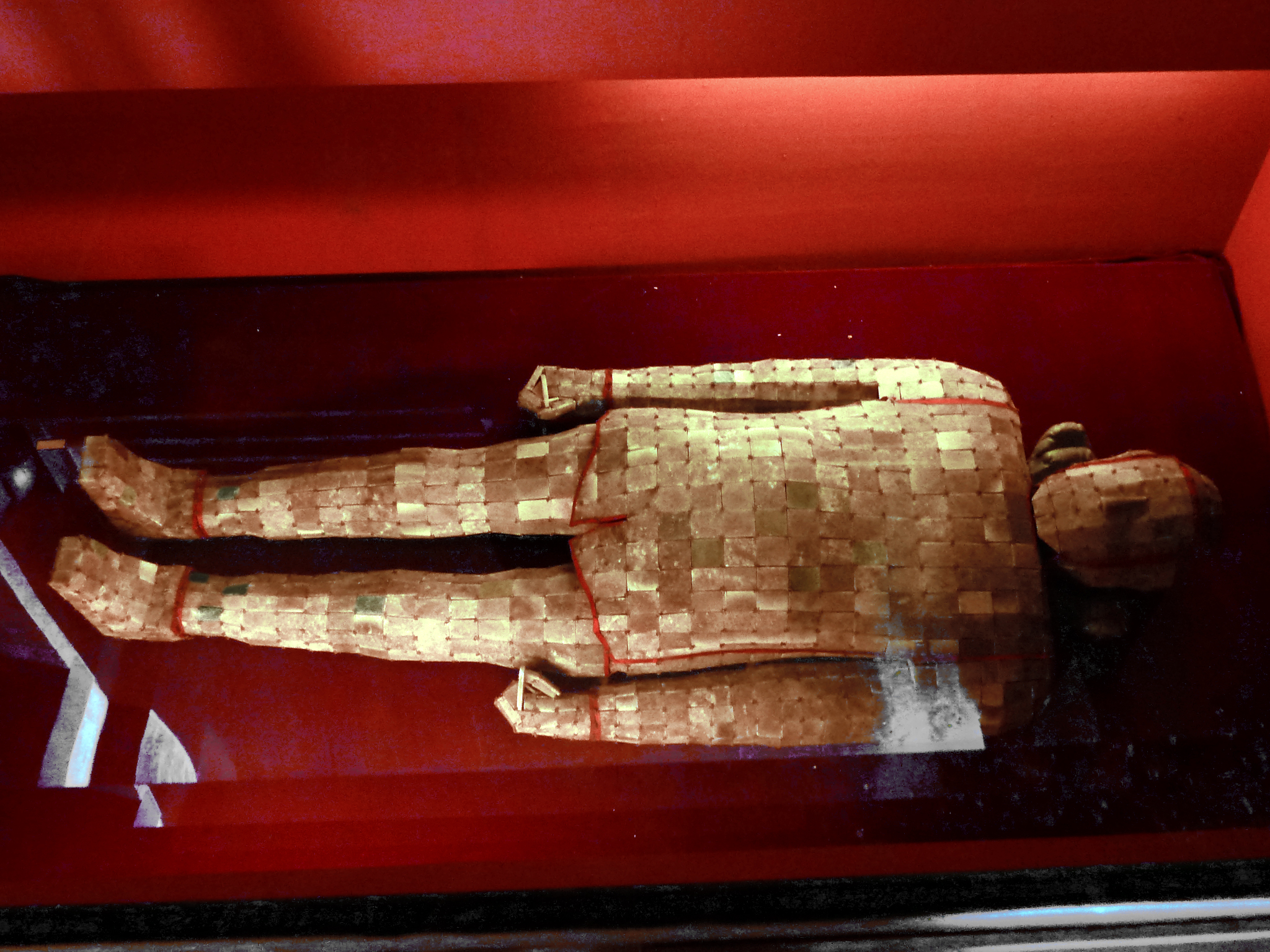
Liu Xu jade funeral suit replica, Han Guangling Tomb Museum

Tianshan town has received its name from its best known natural feature, the Shenju Hill (神居山, literally "home of the spirits"; 32°39′40″N 119°13′29″E), formerly known as "Tianshan" (literally, "heavenly mountain"). Although it is not tall (no more than 50 m above the sea level), it is a basaltic extinct volcano, the only extinct volcano in Yangzhou Prefecture. The tomb of Liu Xu (刘胥), the ruler the Guangling state within the Han Empire, was located at the depth of 25 m inside the extinct volcano. The largely intact tomb was excavated by Chinese archaeologists in 1979–1980. Later, the tomb was re-created, with the original artifacts on display in a purpose-built museum (Han Guangling Royal Tomb Museum, 汉广陵王墓博物馆) in Yangzhou. Although the original funeral jade shroud of Liu Xiu (d. 55 BCE) has been removed to the National Museum of China in Beijing, a full-scale replica is housed here.
