= Hai'an =

Hai'an 海安市 Haian
- County-level city
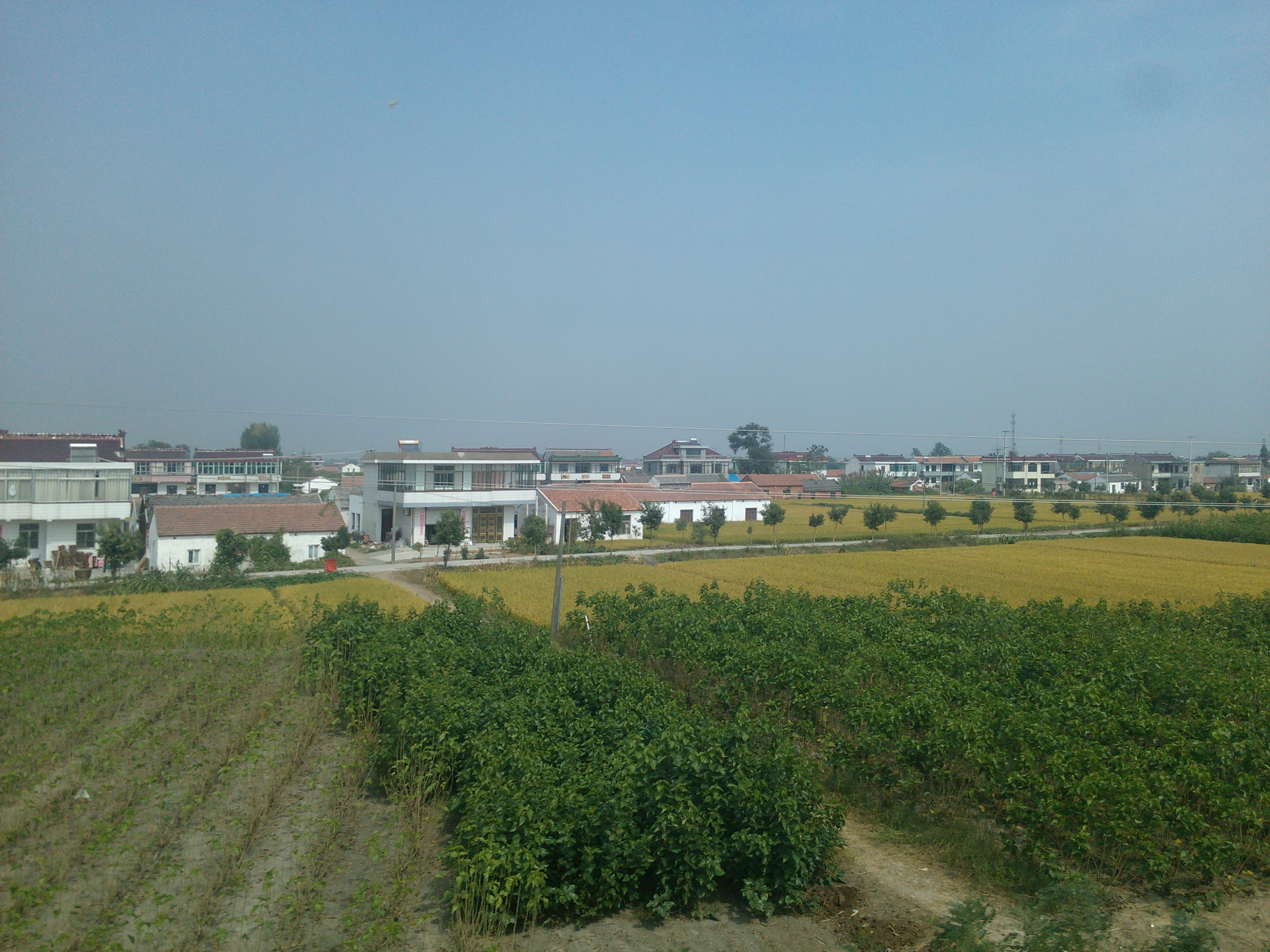
- Hai'an in October 2012

- Location in Jiangsu Hai'an (China)
- Coordinates: 32°32′06″N 120°33′47″E
- Country: People's Republic of China
- Province: Jiangsu
- Prefecture-level city: Nantong

Area
  - Total: 1,180 km^{2} (460 sq mi)

Population (2020 census)
  - Total: 874,334
  - Density: 741/km^{2} (1,920/sq mi)
- Time zone: UTC+8 (China Standard)
- Postal code: 226600
- Website: www.haian.gov.cn/zgha/

Hai'an (Chinese: 海安; pinyin: Hǎi'ān; lit. 'sea peace') is a county-level city under the administration of the prefecture-level city of Nantong, in eastern Jiangsu province, China. Bordering Dongtai to the north, Rudong to the south-east, Rugao to the south, Taixing to the south-west, and Jiangyan to the west, the city is located on the south-western shores of the Yellow Sea.

Hai'an city includes 14 towns. They are Hǎi'ān (海安), Lǎobàgǎng (老坝港), Jiǎoxié (角斜), Lǐbǎo (李堡), Xīchǎng (西场), Dàgōng (大公镇), Chéngdōng (城东), Sūnzhuāng (孙庄), Yǎzhōu (雅周), Qūtáng (曲塘), Hújí (胡集), Nánmò (南莫), Báidiàn (白甸) and Dūntóu (墩头).

== History ==
In 411, Haining (海宁, not the one in Zhejiang), a county administered the area of Hai'an nowadays and its environs was founded. In 471, western Haining was separated to create Hai'an county. The county was dissolved soon, but it was created again in 708. Fourteen years later, it was reduced to town status and annexed by Hailing county, then Taizhou. During the second Sino-Japanese war, Zishi (紫石) county was founded by the communist government there in 1943, it was renamed Hai'an in 1948. It was transferred to Nantong in 1950.

== Administrative divisions ==
At present, Hai'an County has 10 towns.

10 towns

- Hai'an (海安镇)
- Chengdong (城东镇)
- Qutang (曲塘镇)
- Lipu (李堡镇)
- Dagong (大公镇)
- Jiaoxie (角斜镇)
- Yazhou (雅周镇)
- Baidian (白甸镇)
- Nanmo (南莫镇)
- Duntou (墩头镇)

== Climate ==
Climate data for Hai'an, elevation 6 m (20 ft), (1991–2020 normals, extremes 1981–present)
Month	Jan	Feb	Mar	Apr	May	Jun	Jul	Aug	Sep	Oct	Nov	Dec	Year
Record high °C (°F)	19.6 (67.3)	25.4 (77.7)	32.7 (90.9)	33.3 (91.9)	35.0 (95.0)	37.3 (99.1)	39.1 (102.4)	39.0 (102.2)	37.0 (98.6)	32.6 (90.7)	28.5 (83.3)	22.0 (71.6)	39.1 (102.4)
Mean daily maximum °C (°F)	7.2 (45.0)	9.4 (48.9)	14.2 (57.6)	20.4 (68.7)	25.7 (78.3)	28.7 (83.7)	31.9 (89.4)	31.4 (88.5)	27.6 (81.7)	22.7 (72.9)	16.6 (61.9)	9.8 (49.6)	20.5 (68.9)
Daily mean °C (°F)	3.0 (37.4)	4.8 (40.6)	9.0 (48.2)	14.9 (58.8)	20.3 (68.5)	24.2 (75.6)	27.8 (82.0)	27.5 (81.5)	23.4 (74.1)	18.0 (64.4)	11.8 (53.2)	5.3 (41.5)	15.8 (60.5)
Mean daily minimum °C (°F)	−0.1 (31.8)	1.4 (34.5)	5.2 (41.4)	10.3 (50.5)	15.8 (60.4)	20.6 (69.1)	24.7 (76.5)	24.5 (76.1)	20.1 (68.2)	14.2 (57.6)	8.1 (46.6)	1.9 (35.4)	12.2 (54.0)
Record low °C (°F)	−9.8 (14.4)	−8.5 (16.7)	−5.8 (21.6)	−0.9 (30.4)	5.4 (41.7)	11.7 (53.1)	17.5 (63.5)	16.8 (62.2)	9.9 (49.8)	0.9 (33.6)	−4.3 (24.3)	−10.0 (14.0)	−10.0 (14.0)
Average precipitation mm (inches)	46.9 (1.85)	46.6 (1.83)	72.6 (2.86)	65.6 (2.58)	87.6 (3.45)	151.7 (5.97)	206.4 (8.13)	170.8 (6.72)	87.4 (3.44)	50.5 (1.99)	53.5 (2.11)	35.2 (1.39)	1,074.8 (42.32)
Average precipitation days (≥ 0.1 mm)	8.3	8.9	10.1	9.0	10.6	11.1	13.0	12.8	8.5	7.0	7.9	6.9	114.1
Average snowy days	3.1	2.8	0.9	0	0	0	0	0	0	0	0.3	0.9	8
Average relative humidity (%)	74	74	73	72	73	78	81	82	79	75	74	73	76
Mean monthly sunshine hours	134.8	133.9	164.7	187.7	196.6	151.6	186.4	200.6	174.0	176.2	146.6	146.2	1,999.3
Percentage possible sunshine	42	43	44	48	46	36	43	49	47	50	47	47	45
Source: China Meteorological Administration

== See also ==
- Chinese cutter Hai'an
