= Dongtai =

Dongtai 东台市 Tungtai
- County-level city
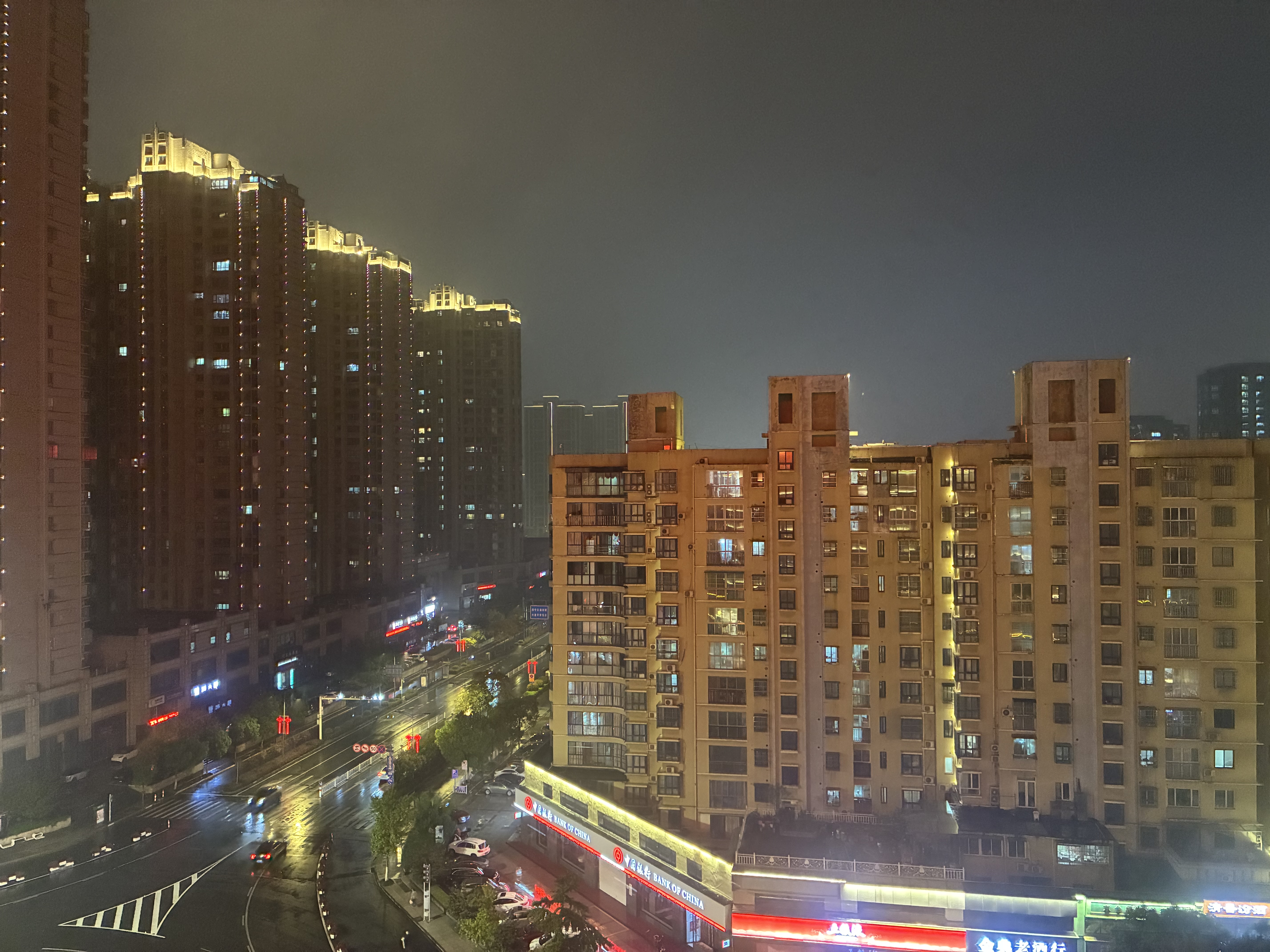

- Location in Jiangsu
- Coordinates: 32°47′42″N 120°31′08″E
- Country: People's Republic of China
- Province: Jiangsu
- Prefecture-level city: Yancheng

Area
  - Total: 3,175.67 km^{2} (1,226.13 sq mi)

Population (2020)
  - Total: 888,410
  - Density: 279.76/km^{2} (724.56/sq mi)
- Time zone: UTC+8 (China Standard)
- Postal code: 224200
- Area code: 0515

Dongtai (simplified Chinese: 东台; traditional Chinese: 東台; pinyin: Dōngtái) is a coastal county-level city under the administration of Yancheng, Jiangsu province, China. It has a population of roughly 1,170,000 estimated for 2007. Out of the total population, about 260,000 live in the Dongtai urban core, others are distributed in the 23 suburban towns and rural regions (Some famous towns include Touzao, Anfeng, Qingdong, Sancang, Qianggang, Fu'an, Tangyang, etc.). With some Yellow Sea coast, it borders the prefecture-level cities of Nantong to the south and Taizhou to the west, and is the southernmost county-level division of Yancheng.

== Administrative divisions ==
There are 14 towns under the city's administration:

- Qindong (溱东镇)
- Shinian (时埝镇) - It Has been renamed to Shiyan (时堰镇)
- Wulie (五烈镇)
- Liangduo (梁垛镇)
- Anfeng (安丰镇)
- Dongtai Town (东台镇)
- Fu'an (富安镇)
- Tangyang (唐洋镇)
- Xinjie (新街镇)
- Xuhe (许河镇)
- Sancang (三仓镇)
- Touzao (头灶镇)
- Jianggang (弶港镇) - It Has been renamed to Yigang (弶港镇)
- Nanshenzao (南沈灶镇)

== Climate ==
Climate data for Dongtai, elevation 3 m (9.8 ft), (1991–2020 normals, extremes 1953–present)
Month	Jan	Feb	Mar	Apr	May	Jun	Jul	Aug	Sep	Oct	Nov	Dec	Year
Record high °C (°F)	20.0 (68.0)	25.4 (77.7)	32.6 (90.7)	32.3 (90.1)	36.7 (98.1)	37.2 (99.0)	38.5 (101.3)	38.8 (101.8)	37.2 (99.0)	36.2 (97.2)	28.2 (82.8)	21.3 (70.3)	38.8 (101.8)
Mean daily maximum °C (°F)	6.6 (43.9)	9.0 (48.2)	13.7 (56.7)	19.9 (67.8)	25.3 (77.5)	28.5 (83.3)	31.5 (88.7)	31.0 (87.8)	27.2 (81.0)	22.3 (72.1)	16.0 (60.8)	9.2 (48.6)	20.0 (68.0)
Daily mean °C (°F)	2.4 (36.3)	4.4 (39.9)	8.6 (47.5)	14.5 (58.1)	20.0 (68.0)	23.9 (75.0)	27.5 (81.5)	27.1 (80.8)	22.9 (73.2)	17.4 (63.3)	11.2 (52.2)	4.7 (40.5)	15.4 (59.7)
Mean daily minimum °C (°F)	−0.8 (30.6)	0.9 (33.6)	4.6 (40.3)	9.9 (49.8)	15.5 (59.9)	20.3 (68.5)	24.5 (76.1)	24.2 (75.6)	19.6 (67.3)	13.5 (56.3)	7.4 (45.3)	1.2 (34.2)	11.7 (53.1)
Record low °C (°F)	−11.8 (10.8)	−11.1 (12.0)	−7.6 (18.3)	−1.4 (29.5)	4.4 (39.9)	11.5 (52.7)	15.4 (59.7)	14.8 (58.6)	9.8 (49.6)	1.7 (35.1)	−5.0 (23.0)	−10.8 (12.6)	−11.8 (10.8)
Average precipitation mm (inches)	40.9 (1.61)	38.5 (1.52)	66 (2.6)	63.2 (2.49)	84.6 (3.33)	154.3 (6.07)	237.1 (9.33)	177.7 (7.00)	83.5 (3.29)	51 (2.0)	54 (2.1)	32.3 (1.27)	1,083.1 (42.61)
Average precipitation days (≥ 0.1 mm)	7.9	7.7	9.2	8.4	10.0	10.3	13.3	12.0	8.5	7.1	7.5	6.4	108.3
Average snowy days	2.7	2.3	0.9	0	0	0	0	0	0	0	0.3	0.8	7
Average relative humidity (%)	76	76	75	74	75	79	83	84	82	78	77	75	78
Mean monthly sunshine hours	146.5	142.4	172.5	198.7	201.2	162.2	182.4	200.4	178.7	183.3	155.2	156.3	2,079.8
Percentage possible sunshine	46	46	46	51	47	38	42	49	49	53	50	51	47
Source: China Meteorological Administration extremes

== Transport ==
Transportation in Dongtai is fairly convenient. There are four International airports (Shanghai Pudong, Shanghai Hongqiao, Nanjing Lukou, Yancheng Nanyang) within 200 kilometers. There are also several other domestic airports nearby. The Xinchang Railway traverses the downtown. China National Highway 204, No. 333 provincial highway, Anqiang provincial road, and G15 Shenyang–Haikou Expressway, alternatively known in the province as the Coastal Expressway (沿海高速公路).

== Culture ==
The dialect in Dongtai is quite different from Mandarin. The local accent is closely related to nearby Taizhou, Haiyan, Xinghua, Dafeng area.

The cuisine in Dongtai is closely related to Huai-Yang. The taste is not strong, and that is different from most of other regions in China. In Dongtai, people also have chance to eat different seafood.

Tourist can also find fun in Dongtai. Xi-xi ancient town is the cradle of Dongtai and it is also a Holy land of Buddhism. The Yellow Sea (Huanghai) National Park is on the east coastal region of Dongtai and there are also a national everglade protection region and a five-A (the highest level) precious animal protection region nearby.
