= Pingjiang Road =

Road in China

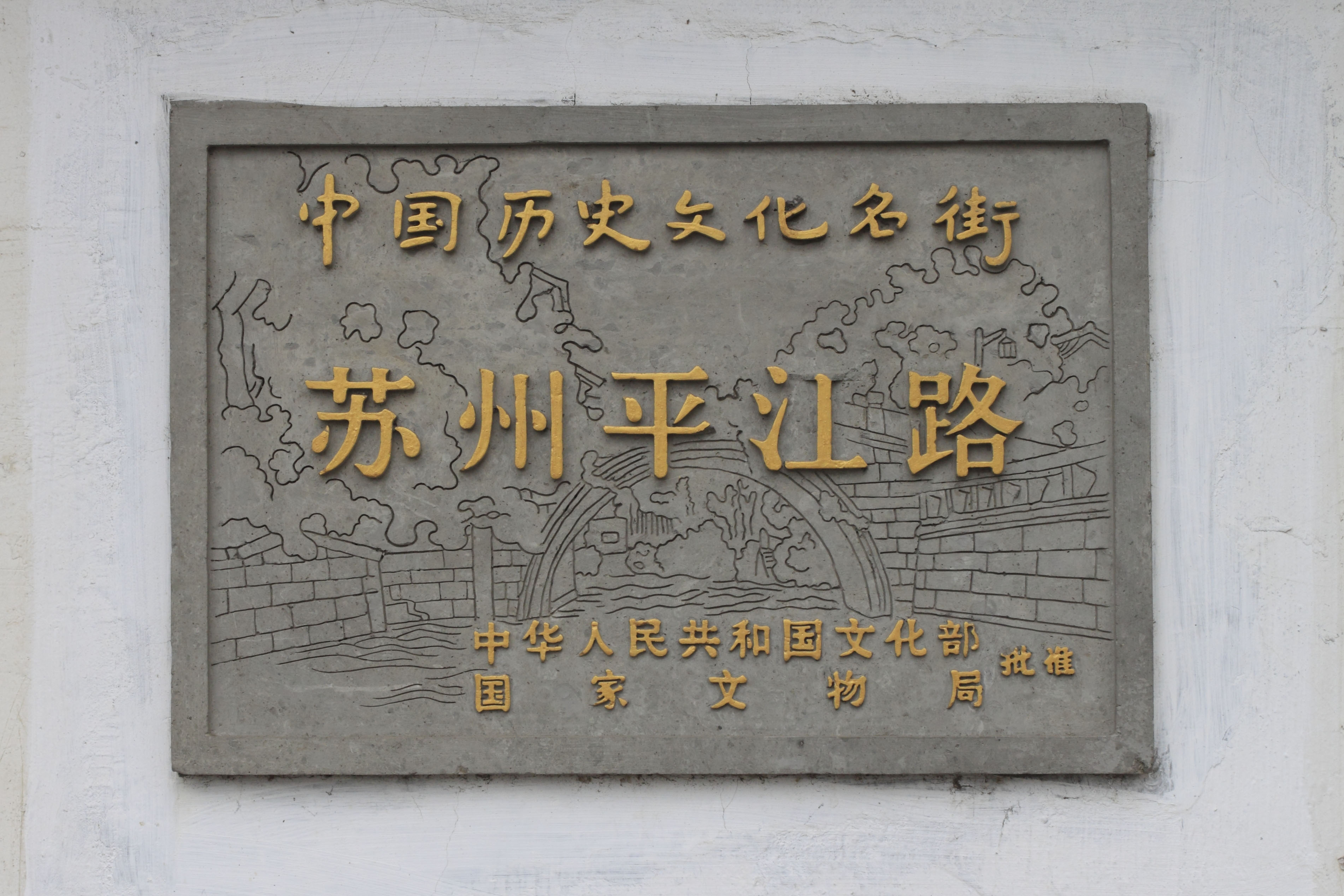
- Pingjiang Road
- Interactive map of Pingjiang Road
- Native name: 平江路 (Chinese)
- Former name: 十泉里
- Length: 1,606 m (5,269 ft)

Other
- Status: Complete
- Website: pj-road.com/En/Default

Pingjiang Road (Chinese: 平江路; pinyin: Píngjiāng Lù), historically known as Shiquan Li (Chinese:十泉里), is a street and historic district in Gusu District (formerly the Pingjiang District), northeastern Suzhou, Jiangsu, China. It is a well-preserved area and is part of the so-called Old Town of Suzhou.

In 2015, the Pingjiang Road Historical Block was added to the list of China's "National Historic and Cultural Streets".

== Overview ==
The main street (Pingjiang Road) is located along Pingjiang He (Chinese:平江河) and is 1,606 metres (5,269 ft) in length. It stretches from Ganjiang Donglu (Chinese:干将东路) in the south to Baita Road East (Chinese:白塔东路) in the northwest, near the Humble Administrator's Garden and Suzhou Museum. The entire historic district covers an area of 0.4 square kilometres (0.15 sq mi). The city of Suzhou was known as Pingjiang during Southern Song dynasty. As a major thoroughfare of eastern Suzhou back then, the street carries on the former name of the city. It was featured in the map Pingjiang Tu (Chinese:平江图), produced in the year 1229. There are 51 smaller alleys intersecting the street. There are also about 3 kilometres (1.9 mi) of canals within the historic district.

In 2009, Pingjiang Road was listed as a Zhongguo Lishi Wenhua Mingjie (Chinese:中国历史文化名街, literally: Famous historical and cultural street of China), one of the first nine streets with such title across China. Along with Shantang Street, the area was also declared a Zhongguo Lishi Wenhua Jiequ (Chinese:中国历史文化街区, literally: Historical and cultural block of China) in 2015.

A BBC Travel article describes Pingjiang Road as less touristy than Shantang Street and states that it is "lined with houses that embody Suzhou’s style – graceful, simple and timeless. Pingjiang Road gives an insight into the leisurely existence of the city’s residents. [It is a] centre of Suzhou's artistic life, lined with bookshops and local opera theatres. There are also several teahouses, where people gather for performances of traditional storytelling and ballad singing".

Couple's Retreat Garden (Ou Yuan), a noted Classical Garden located within the historic district, is part of the UNESCO World Heritage Site Classical Gardens of Suzhou. Guanqian Street is also in walking distance. There are two national-class and 12 provincial-class protection units within the historic district. Pingjiang Road undergone a major renovation prior to the 28th Session of the World Heritage Committee which took place in Suzhou in 2004.

== Bridges within the district ==
There are 18 stone bridges in the Pingjiang Road historic district. Among them, 12 bridges (or in their previous forms) are shown on the Song dynasty Pingjiang Tu. They are namely Sipo, Shou'an, Xuegao, Jiqing, Sujun, Zhong'an, Tongli, Huxingsi, Beikaiming, Tangjia, Zhumajiao and Xiaoxin. 10 of the bridges are lying in the north–south direction, the other eight in the east–west direction. The historic district thus has the highest density of bridges across Suzhou.

English name	Chinese name	Built/Renovated	Notes and references
Zhumajiao Bridge	朱马交桥	Unknown. Renovated 1250, 1684, 1982, 2003	Also known as Zhumagao Bridge (Chinese:朱马高桥). Sometimes written as 朱马茭桥
Tangjia Bridge	唐家桥	Renovated 1744, 1984, 2003	
Huxiangsi Bridge	胡相思桥	Renovated 1744, 1983	The only archbridge in Pingjiang Road Historic District, formerly known as Huxingshi Bridge (Chinese:胡厢使桥)
Tongli Bridge	通利桥	Renovated 1814, 1984	
Xiaoxin Bridge and Zhong'an Bridge	小新桥与众安桥	Xiaoxin Bridge was renovated in 1918 and 1984	Xiaoxin Bridge was known as Beizhangjie Bridge (Chinese:北张家桥) on Pingjiang Tu and Xin Bridge (Chinese:新桥) on the Qing dynasty Suzhou Fuzhi, while Zhong'an Bridge is also known as Daxin Bridge (Chinese:大新桥). The two bridges lie close together.
Sujun Bridge	苏军桥	Renovated 1814, 1960, 1980	Also known as Sujin Bridge (Chinese:苏锦桥) and colloquially as Qingshi Bridge (Chinese:青石桥)
Jiqing Bridge	积庆桥		also known as Shengli Bridge (Chinese:胜利桥), and colloquially as Jiqing Bridge (Chinese:吉庆桥)
Sipo Bridge	思婆桥	Renovated 1805, 1985	Formerly known as Shipo Bridge (Chinese:师婆桥)
Shou'an Bridge	寿安桥	Renovated 1960, 1985	Known as Zifu Bridge (Chinese:资福桥) in the early Qing dynasty
Xuegao Bridge	雪糕桥	Renovated 1753, 1905, 1985	

== The story of Hong Jun and Sai Jinhua ==
Hong Jun, a scholar and diplomat temporarily residing on 27 Xuanqiao Lane, Pingjiang Road, met 20-year-old Sai Jinhua in 1886, then as a prostitute while on a flower boat. At the time Hong Jun was in mourning due to his mother's death. Hong Jun made Sai Jinhua his concubine one year after meeting her. Sai Jinhua followed Hong Jun in his diplomatic visits to Russia, Germany, Australia and the Netherlands, Sai Jinhua also gave birth to a daughter named Deguan. The couple returned to Suzhou in 1893 and made 29 Xuanqiao Lane home, neighboring Hong Jun's former residence. However, two months after their return, Hong Jun became sick and died at age 55. Sai Jinhua was forced to leave the house after Hong's death and carried on her profession as a courtesan in Shanghai.

== Transportation ==
Pingjiang Road is within walking distance to the Xiangmen Station of Line 1 of the Suzhou Metro.

== Gallery ==
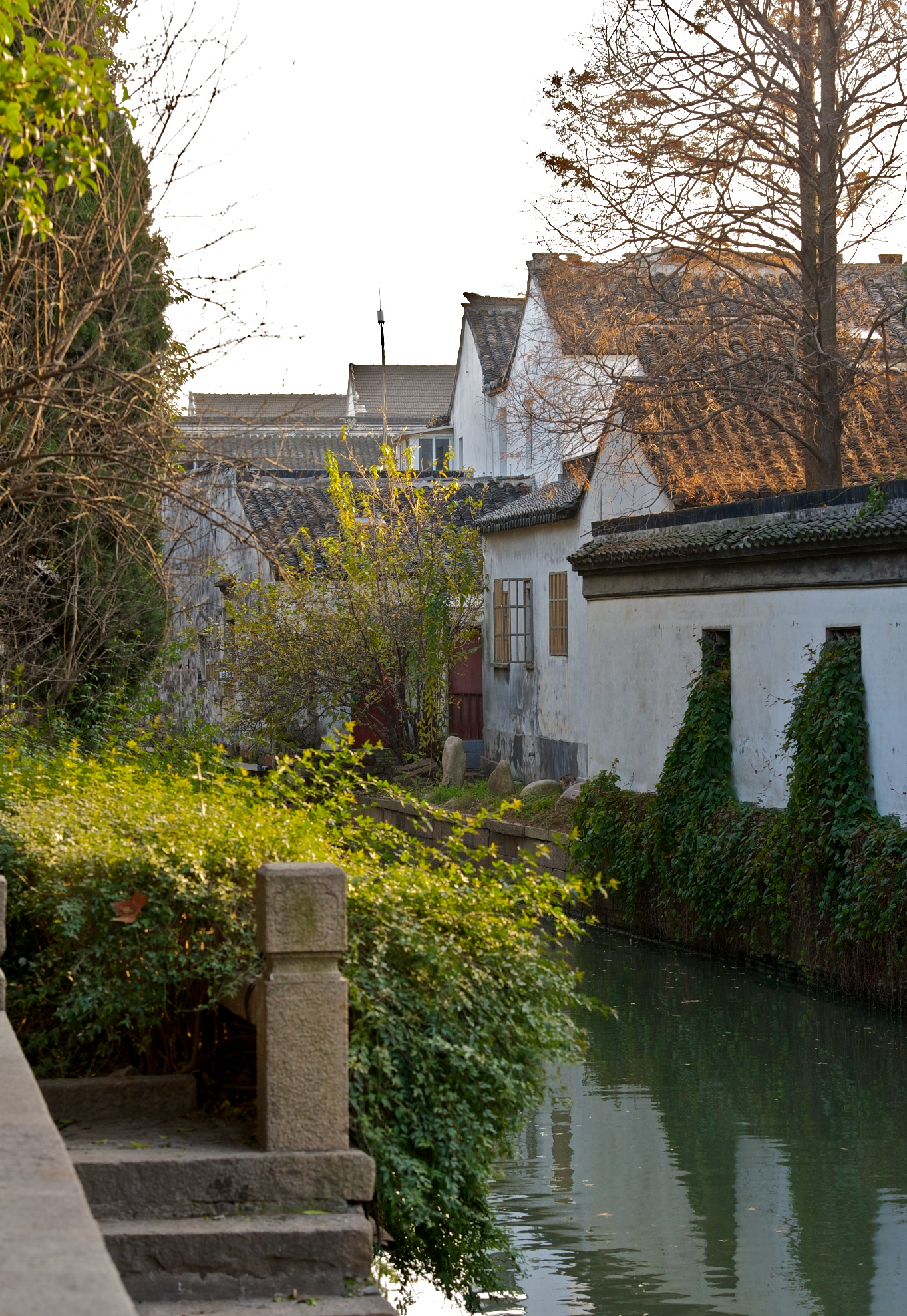

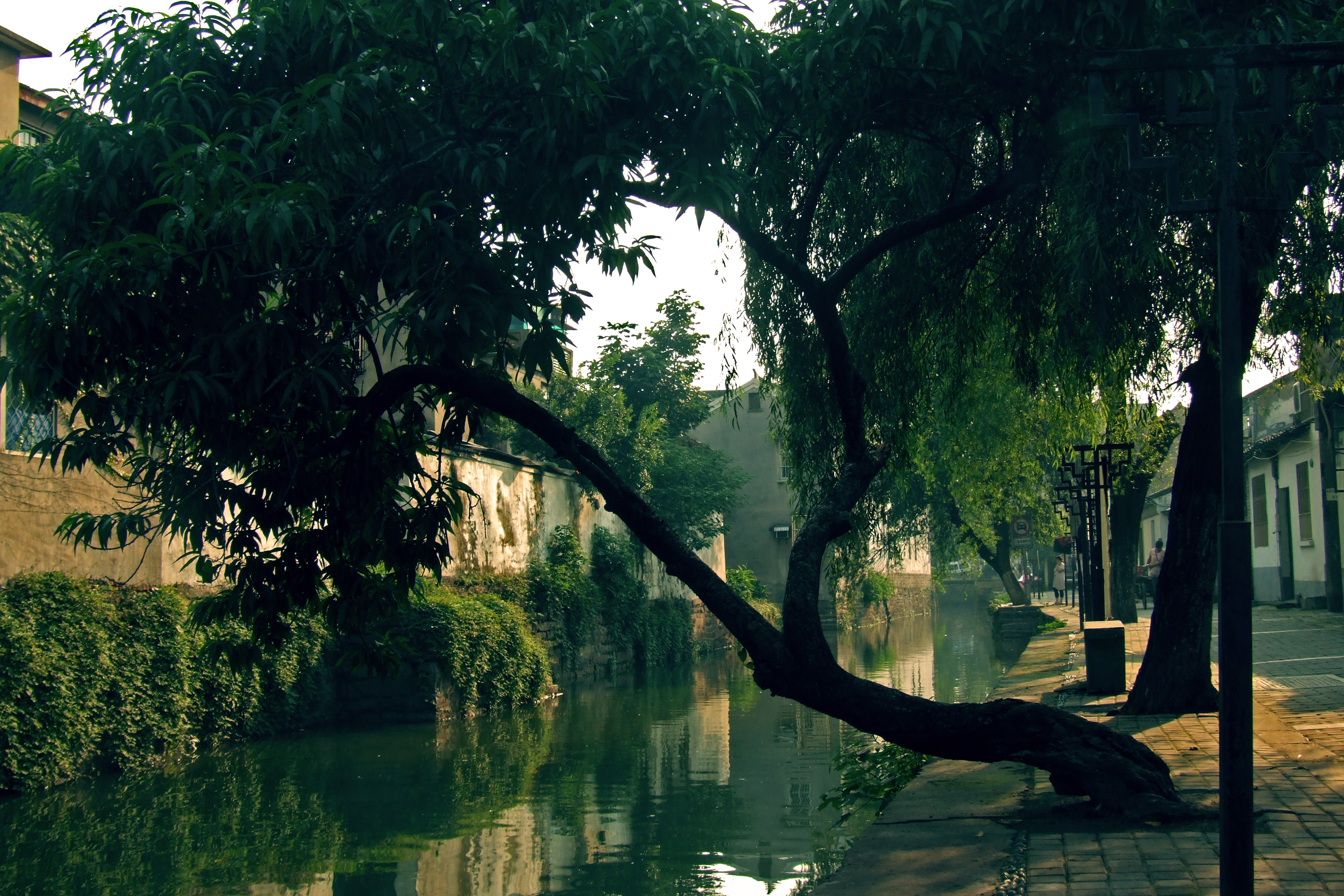

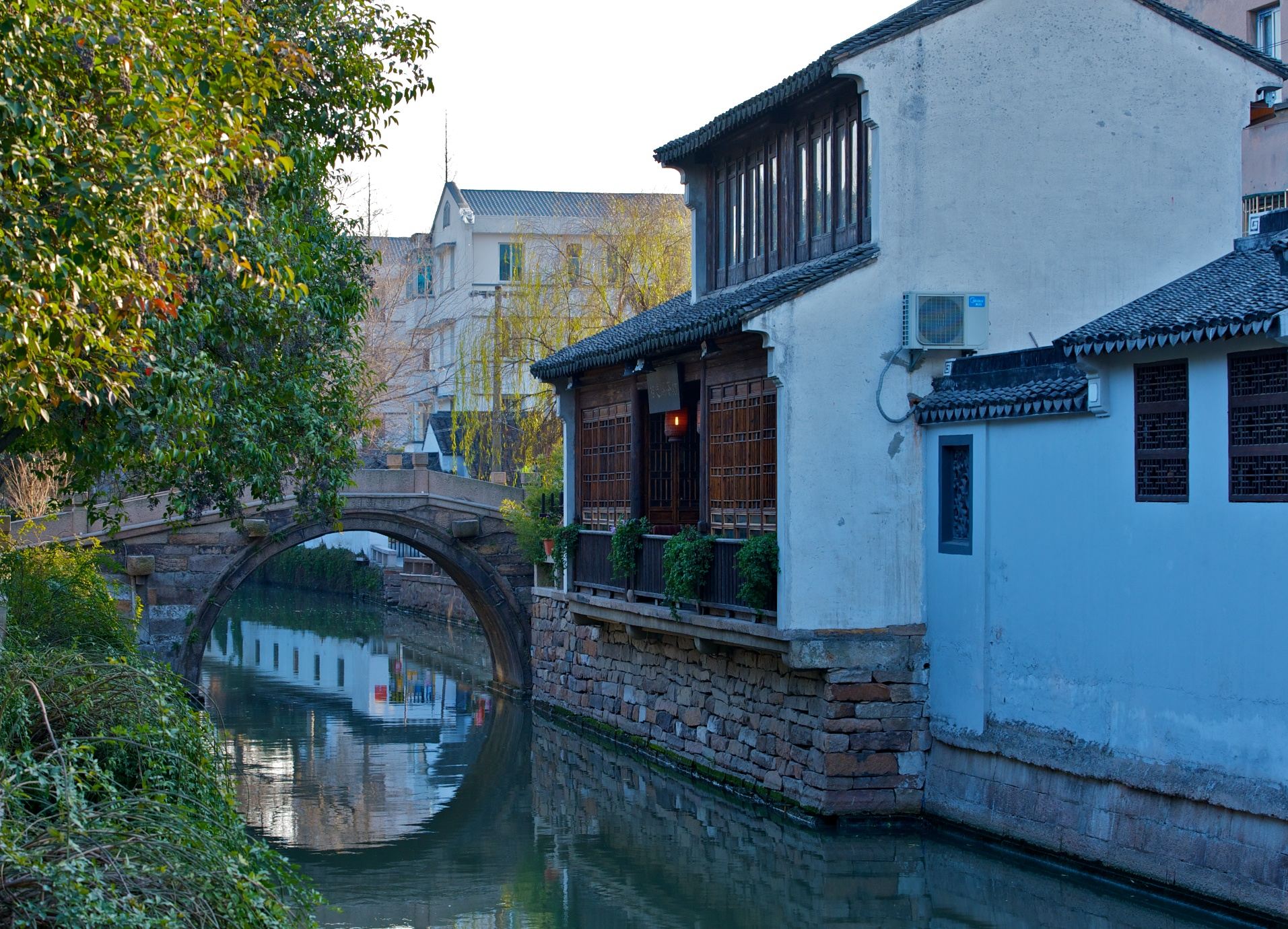

== See also ==
- Pingjiang Subdistrict
- Momi cafe, a cafe in Pingjiang Road
