= Shilu Subdistrict =

Shilu Subdistrict 石路街道
- Subdistrict
- Location within Jiangsu Location within China
- Coordinates: 31.31145°N 120.58872°E
- Country: China
- Province: Jiangsu
- City: Suzhou
- District: Gusu District
- Time zone: UTC+8 (China Standard Time)

Shilu Subdistrict (Chinese: 石路街道) is a former subdistrict of Gusu District, Suzhou, Jiangsu, China. The subdistrict was abolished on March 24, 2017, when it was merged into Jinchang Subdistrict.

== Administrative divisions ==
In 2016, before its abolition, Shilu Subdistrict administered the following 7 residential communities:

- Caixiang First Village South District Community (Chinese: 彩香一村南区社区)
- Caixiang First Village Third District Community (Chinese: 彩香一村三区社区)
- Caixiang First Village Fourth District Community (Chinese: 彩香一村四区社区)
- Jialing Community (Chinese: 佳菱社区)
- Xinji Community (Chinese: 信记社区)
- Sanlewan Community (Chinese: 三乐湾社区)
- Zhujiazhuang Community (Chinese: 朱家庄社区)

== See also ==
- Jinchang Subdistrict
- List of township-level divisions of Suzhou
