= Zhuhuiqiao station =

Suzhou Metro station

Zhuhuiqiao 竹辉桥
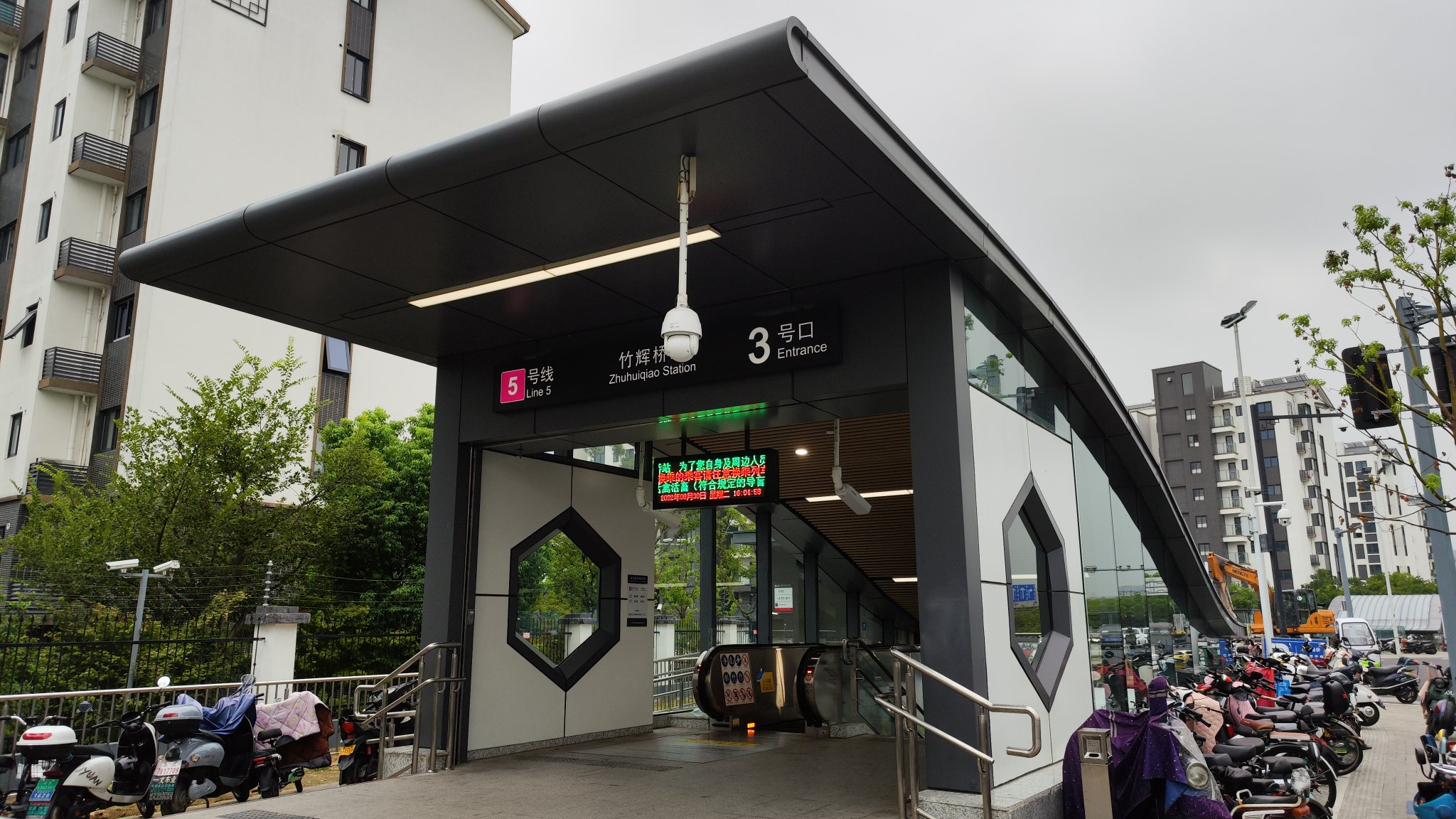

General information
- Location: Gusu District, Suzhou, Jiangsu; China
- Coordinates: 31.29635°N 120.64276°E
- Operator: Suzhou Rail Transit Co., Ltd
- Line: Line 5
- Platforms: 2 (1 island platform)

Construction
- Structure type: Underground

History
- Opened: June 29, 2021

Services
Preceding station	Suzhou Metro	Following station
Nanyuanbeilu towards Taihu Xiangshan	Line 5	Hehuadang towards Yangchenghu South
Location
- Location within Jiangsu

Zhuhuiqiao Station (Chinese: 竹辉桥) is a station on Line 5 of the Suzhou Metro. The station is located in Gusu District, Jiangsu. It has been in use since June 29, 2021, when Line 5 first opened to the public.
