= Pingjiang =

Pingjiang may refer to:

- Pingjiang County, in Yueyang, Hunan, China
- Pingjiang District, in Suzhou, Jiangsu, China
