= Momi =

Momi may refer to:

== People ==
- Hilaire Momi (born 1990), Central African footballer
- Momi Zafran (born 1956), Israeli football coach
- Momi Gul Durrani (1938–1965), Pakistani air hostess and model
- Raaginder (born 1992), Thai Indian musician

== Places ==
- Museum of the Moving Image, a museum in New York
- Museum of the Moving Image (London), a museum in London
- Pali Momi Medical Center, a nonprofit hospital located in West O‘ahu, Hawai‘i
- Momi cafe, a coffee house in Pingjiang Road, Suzhou, China

== Other uses ==
- Abies firma, the momi fir, a species of fir native to central and southern Japan
- Momi (ship), several Japanese ships
