= Xuanmiao Temple =

Taoist temple in Suzhou, China

Coordinates: 31°18′52″N 120°37′19″E

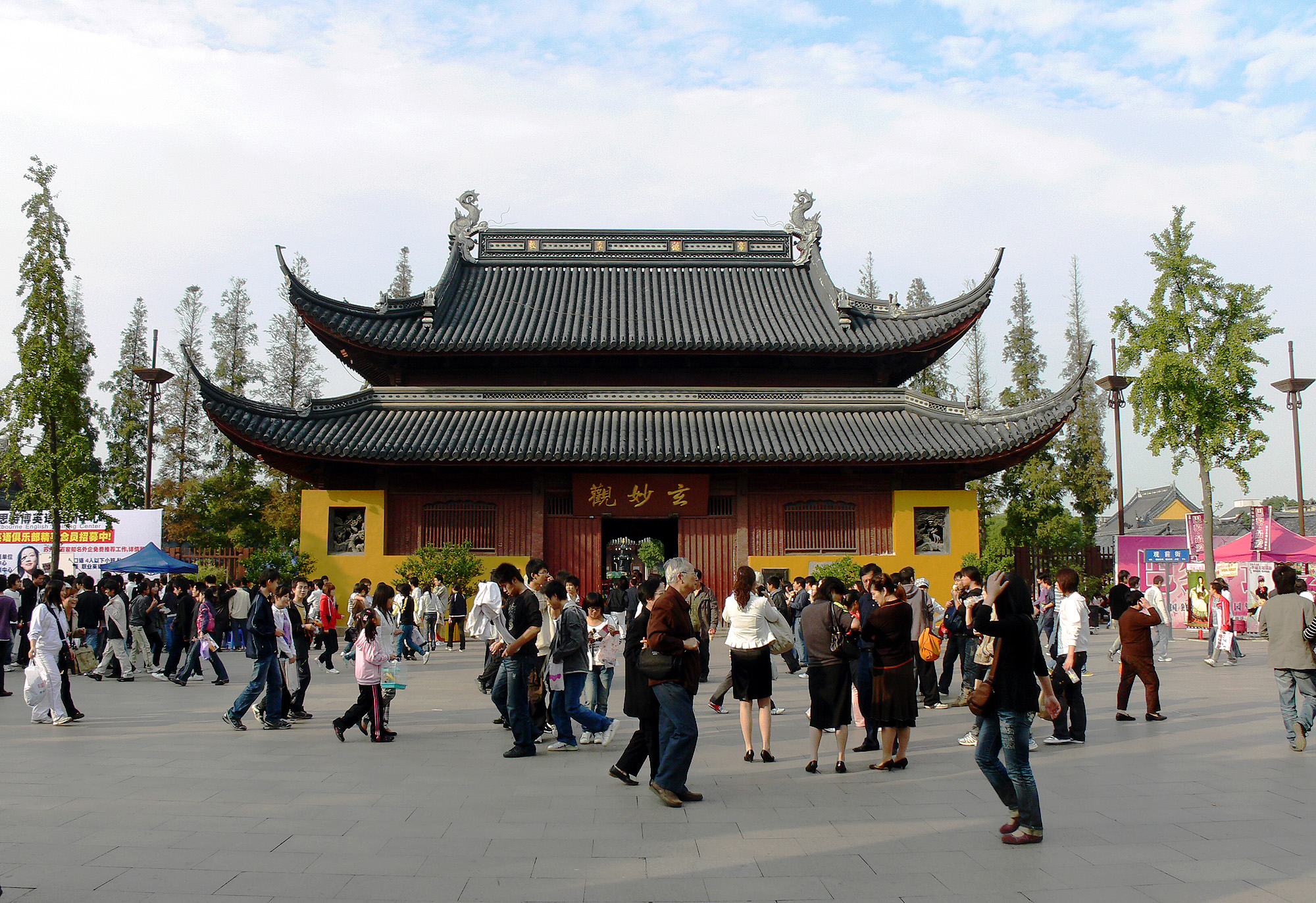
Xuanmiao Guan

Xuanmiao Temple (Chinese: 玄妙观; pinyin: Xuánmiào Guàn; lit. 'Temple of Mystery') is a prominent Taoist temple with a long history, located at the center of old Suzhou City.

The street along the east–west direction in front of the temple is called Guanqian Street, a famed business pedestrian street in Suzhou. A lane called Gong Xiang (宫巷) along north–south direction leads directly to the gate.

== History ==
Xuanmiao Temple was founded in Xianning 2nd year (AD 276), Western Jin dynasty, and was initially named "Zhenqing Daoyuan" (真庆道院). It was destroyed by wars in Southern Song dynasty. It was rebuilt in the Chunxi era (1174–1189) of the reign of Emperor Xiaozong of Song, and was renamed Xuanmiao Guan in 1264. During the reign of the Kangxi Emperor in the Qing dynasty, the temple was renamed Yuanmiao Guan (元妙观) to avoid naming taboo because the emperor's personal name, Xuanye (玄烨), contained the Chinese character xuan (玄).

The first structure of the temple that visitors see is the Zheng Shan Men. It is built entirely from wood. The Zheng Shan Men is aligned south to north, with the main entrance facing south. It has two side entrances, in the east and west. The temple dates back to the Tang dynasty. It suffered some damages in the eighteenth century and had to be rebuilt in 1775. The temple houses six statues of Taoist gods. There are also idols of four marshals and two generals. The temple's flank has a tablet commemorating the restoration of the temple.

== Gallery ==
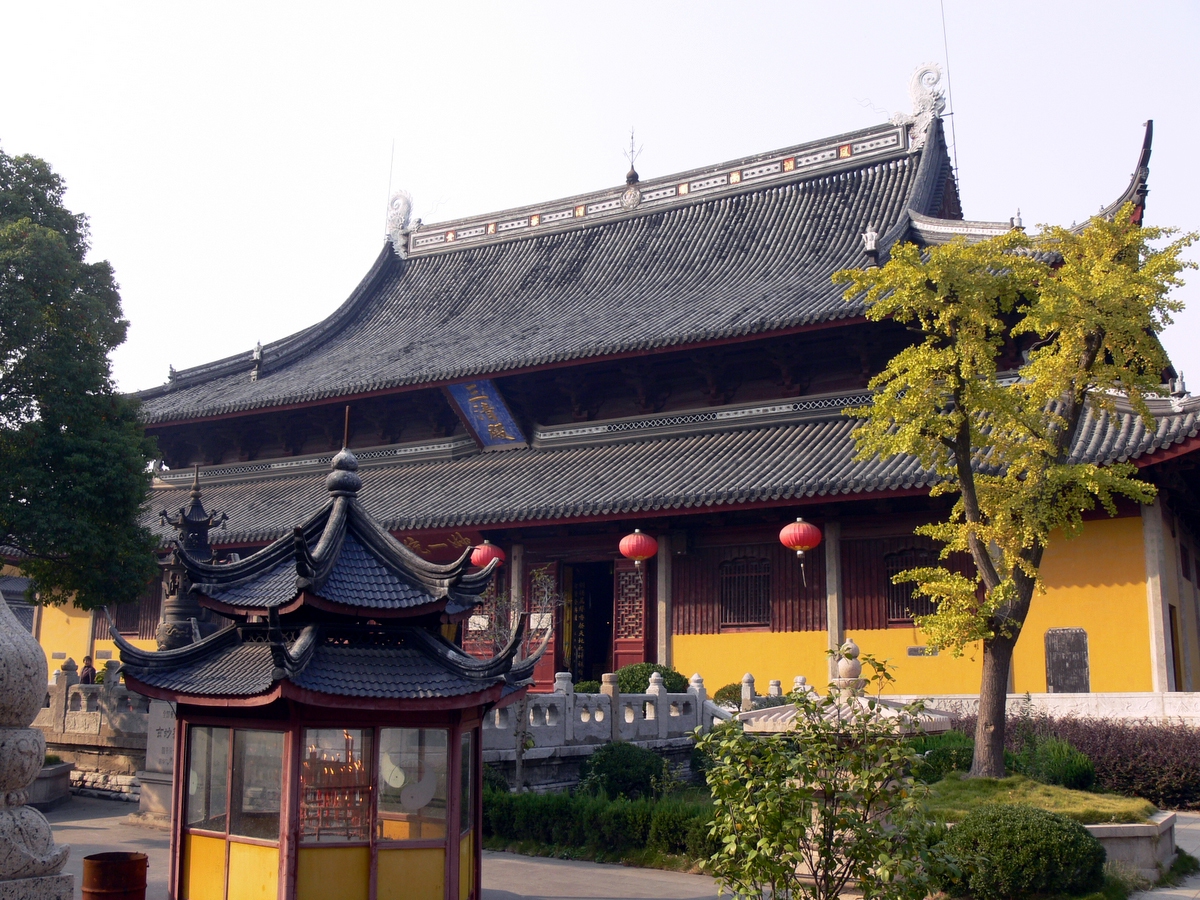
San Qing Hall

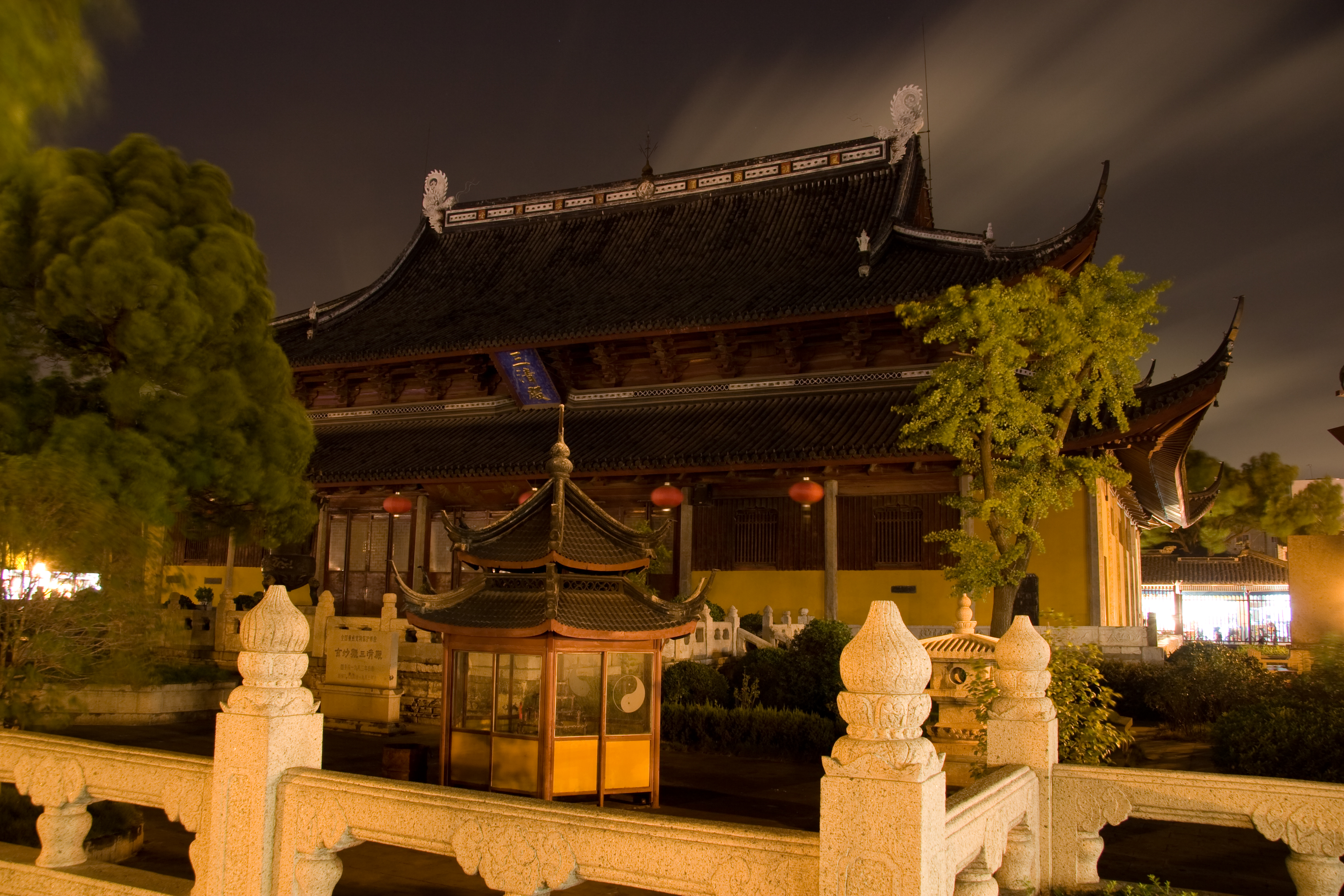
Xuanmiao Temple at night
