= Guanqian Subdistrict =

Guanqian Subdistrict 观前街道
- Subdistrict
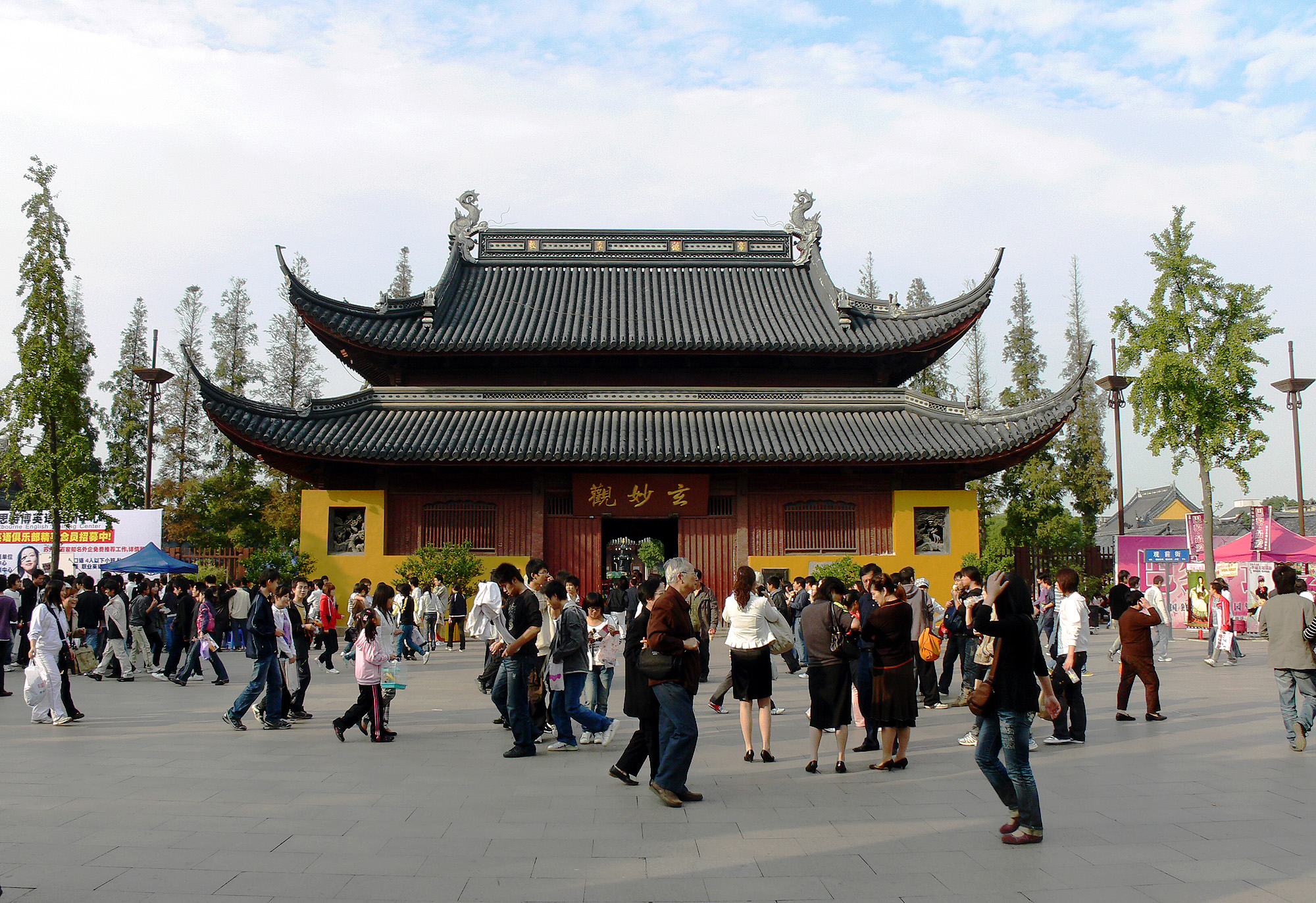
- Xuanmiaoguan.jpg

- Location within Jiangsu
- Coordinates: 31.31996°N 120.61582°E
- Country: China
- Province: Jiangsu
- City: Suzhou
- District: Gusu District
- Time zone: UTC+8 (China Standard Time)

Guanqian Subdistrict (simplified Chinese: 观前街道; traditional Chinese: 觀前街道; pinyin: Guānqián Jiēdào) was a subdistrict of Gusu District, Suzhou, Jiangsu, China. It was abolished in March 2017, when it was merged into Pingjiang Subdistrict.

== Administrative divisions ==
In 2016, before its abolition, Guanqian Subdistrict administered the following eight residential communities (Chinese: 社区; pinyin: shèqū):

- Chayuanchang Community (Chinese: 察院场社区)
- Xiaogongyuan Community (Chinese: 小公园社区)
- Xuanmiaoguan Community (Chinese: 玄妙观社区)
- Jiuxueqian Community (Chinese: 旧学前社区)
- Zhuangjiaqiao Community (Chinese: 装驾桥社区)
- Xianghuaqiao Community (Chinese: 香花桥社区)
- Xibeijie Community (Chinese: 西北街社区)
- Beisita Community (Chinese: 北寺塔社区)

== See also ==
- Gusu District
- List of township-level divisions of Suzhou
- Pingjiang Subdistrict
