= Beisita station =

Metro station in Suzhou, China

Beisita 北寺塔
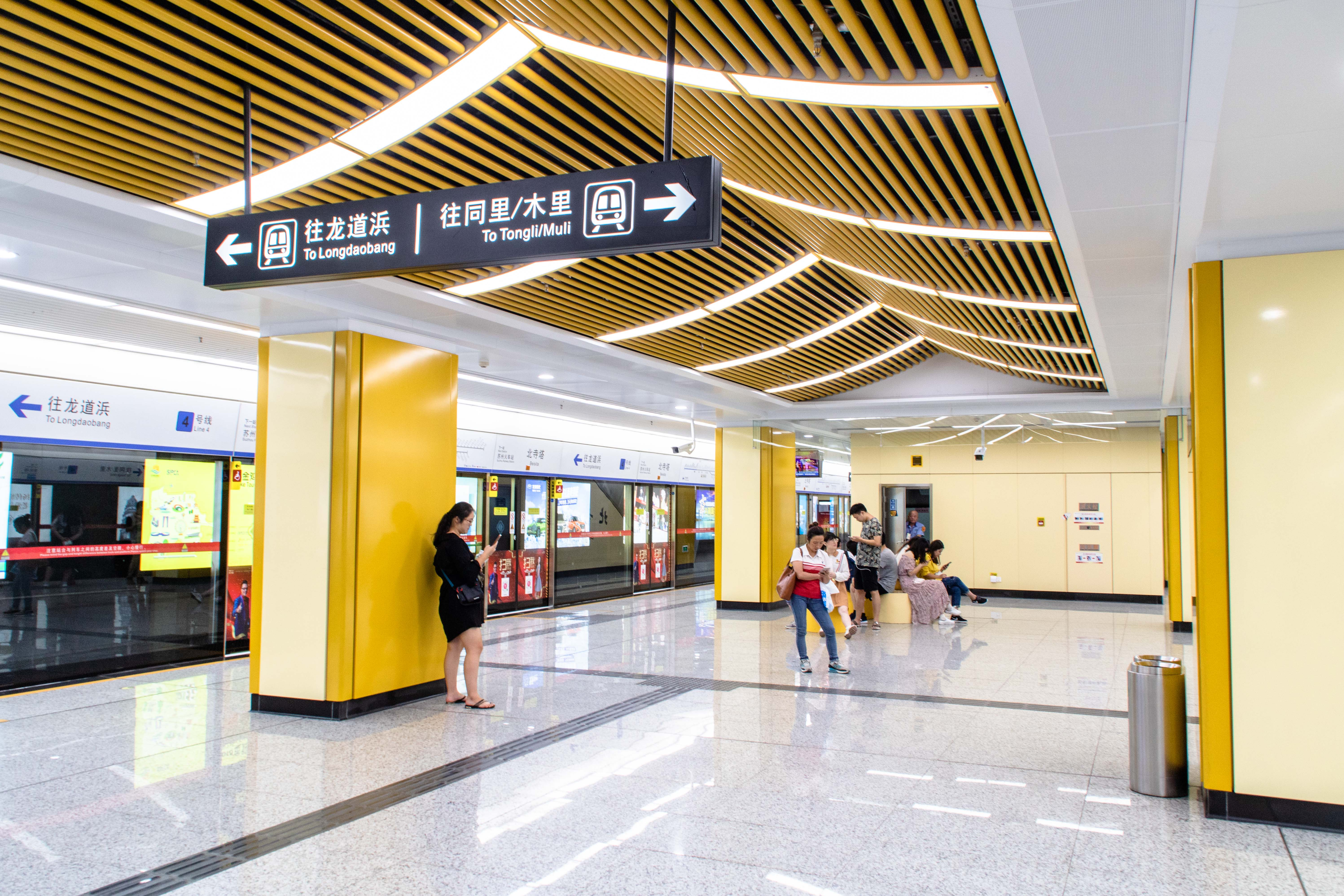

General information
- Location: Renmin Road × Taohuawu Street & Xibei Street; Gusu District, Suzhou, Jiangsu; China
- Coordinates: 31°19′23″N 120°36′54″E
- Operated by: Suzhou Rail Transit Co., Ltd
- Line: Line 4
- Platforms: 2 (1 island platform)

Construction
- Structure type: Underground

History
- Opened: April 15, 2017

Services
Preceding station	Suzhou Metro	Following station
Suzhou Railway Station towards Longdaobang	Line 4	Chayuanchang towards Tongli
Location

Beisita (Chinese: 北寺塔) is a station on Line 4 of the Suzhou Metro. The station is located in Gusu District of Suzhou. It has been in use since April 15, 2017, when Line 4 first opened.
