= Sujin Subdistrict =

Coordinates: 31.3279°N 120.6226°E

Sujin Subdistrict 苏锦街道
- Subdistrict
- Interactive map of Sujin Subdistrict
- Country: China
- Province: Jiangsu
- City: Suzhou
- District: Gusu District
- Time zone: UTC+8 (China Standard Time)

Sujin Subdistrict (Chinese: 苏锦街道) is a township-level division of Gusu District, Suzhou, Jiangsu, China.

== See also ==
- List of township-level divisions of Suzhou
