= Youxin Subdistrict =

Youxin Subdistrict 友新街道
- Subdistrict
- Location within Jiangsu Location within China
- Coordinates: 31.27419°N 120.60461°E
- Country: China
- Province: Jiangsu
- City: Suzhou
- District: Gusu District
- Time zone: UTC+8 (China Standard Time)

Youxin Subdistrict (Chinese: 友新街道) is a former subdistrict of Gusu District, Suzhou, Jiangsu, China. The subdistrict was abolished on March 24, 2017 when it was merged into Wumenqiao Subdistrict.

== Administrative divisions ==
In 2016, before its abolition, Youxin Subdistrict administered the following 14 residential communities:

- Guxiang Community (Chinese: 姑香社区)
- Fuxing First Community (Chinese: 福星第一社区)
- Xinkang First Community (Chinese: 新康第一社区)
- Youlian First Community (Chinese: 友联第一社区)
- Youlian Second Community (Chinese: 友联第二社区)
- Youlian Third Community (Chinese: 友联第三社区)
- Xiangya Community (Chinese: 象牙社区)
- Meiting Community (Chinese: 梅亭社区)
- Sijijinghua Community (Chinese: 四季晶华社区)
- Xinguo Community (Chinese: 新郭社区)
- Youlian Community (Chinese: 友联社区)
- Shuangqiao Community (Chinese: 双桥社区)
- Canglang Xincheng Community (Chinese: 沧浪新城社区)
- Fuyun Community (Chinese: 福运社区)

== See also ==
- List of township-level divisions of Suzhou
- Wumenqiao Subdistrict
