= Japanese ship Momi =

Several ships have been named Momi (樅 / もみ; "abies firma"):

- Japanese destroyer Momi (1919), lead ship of her class
  - Momi-class destroyer, a class of destroyers of the Imperial Japanese Navy
- Japanese submarine I-52 (1943), a submarine of the Imperial Japanese Navy, code-named Momi
- Japanese destroyer Momi (1944), a Matsu-class destroyer of the Imperial Japanese Navy during World War II
- JDS Momi (PF-284), a Kusu-class patrol frigate of the Japan Maritime Self-Defense Force, formerly USS Poughkeepsie (PF-26)

== See also ==
- Momi (disambiguation)
