= Loumen Subdistrict =

Coordinates: 31.3238°N 120.64337°E

Loumen Subdistrict 娄门街道
- Subdistrict
- Interactive map of Loumen Subdistrict
- Country: China
- Province: Jiangsu
- City: Suzhou
- District: Gusu District
- Time zone: UTC+8 (China Standard Time)

Loumen Subdistrict (Chinese: 娄门街道) is a township-level division of Gusu District, Suzhou, Jiangsu, China.

== See also ==
- List of township-level divisions of Suzhou
