= Jinchang District =

Former district of Suzhou, Jiangsu, China

Coordinates: 31°39′N 120°37′E

Jinchang 金阊区
- District of the People's Republic of China
- 1955–2012
- History
  - Established: 1955
  - Disestablished: 2012
Succeeded by
Gusu District
- Today part of: Part of the Gusu District, Suzhou

Jinchang District (simplified Chinese: 金阊区; traditional Chinese: 金閶區; pinyin: Jīnchāng Qū) is a former district of Suzhou in Jiangsu Province. The district had an area of 35.7 km^{2} (13.8 sq mi) and in 2001 the population was around 250,000.

The postal code for Jinchang District is 215008 and the telephone code is 0512.

On 1 September 2012, Jinchang District was merged with Pingjiang District and Canglang District to form Gusu District.
