= Hong Jun =

Chinese diplomat

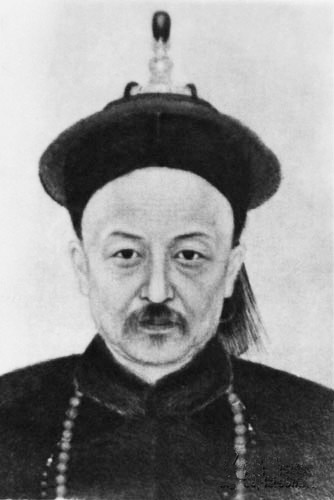
Hong Jun

Hong Jun (traditional Chinese: 洪 鈞; simplified Chinese: 洪 钧; pinyin: Hóng Jūn; Wade–Giles: Hung^{2} Chün^{1}; 1839–1893) was a Chinese diplomat. From 1887 to 1890 he had served as a special emissary of the Qing dynasty government to Russia, Germany, the Netherlands, and Austria.

== Biography ==
Hong was born in 1839. At age 30, he became a zhuangyuan. In 1887 Hong Jun, by then a major Chinese official, met Sai Jinhua ("Prettier Than Golden Flower") while he visited Suzhou. At the time Hong Jun was in mourning due to his mother's death. Hong Jun made Sai Jinhua his concubine one year after meeting her. In April of that year, Sai Jinhua went to Beijing with Hong Jun.

Empress Dowager Cixi appointed Hong Jun as the Chinese envoy to Europe, and so Hong Jun traveled to Russia, Austria, the Netherlands, and Germany as part of his diplomatic duties. Sai Jinhua accompanied him because Hong Jun's wife was not willing to travel with him. Sai Jinhua, with Hong Jun, lived in Europe for three years. In Berlin Hong Jun mostly stayed in his residence when not attending his duties. When he did go outside, he went on walks on the Tiergarten. In Berlin Hong Jun did not allow Sai Jinhua to attend most of his parties, including those that he held at his residence. Hong Jun was opposed to European customs, especially those involving females and males associating with one another. He did begin wearing European socks after initial vehemence against doing so when he discovered their comfort.

David Der-wei Wang wrote that Hong Jun was dismissed from his position "for allegedly settling boundary disputes on the basis of twelve Russian maps of the Chinese border area that turned out to be faulty and thus made China lose land to Czarist Russia." Hong Jun's term finished. After the end of the diplomatic tour, the couple moved to Beijing. There, Hong Jun was held a post in the Foreign Office (zongli yamen) and concurrently received an appointment to being the senior vice-minister of the Ministry of War.

Sai Jinhua gave birth to her daughter Deguan (德官; Déguān; Te^{2}-kuan^{1}) in 1890. Hong Jun became sick and died in 1893, shortly after his return to their home at 29 Xuanqiao Lane, Pingjiang Road, Suzhou. In 1894 Sai Jinhua became a prostitute again because Hong Jun's relatives did not support her financially. Sai Jinhua and Deguan traveled to Suzhou with the coffin of Hong Jun as his body was moved there.

== Views on race ==
After receiving insults from White Europeans at a church, Hong Jun said that Jesus was a Jew. He argued that like himself, Jesus had black hair and black eyes. Therefore, he accused them of insulting a fellow man of Jesus.

== Legacy ==
The character Jin Jun (Jin Wenqing) in A Flower in a Sinful Sea (Niehai Hua) is based on Hong Jun.
