= Canglang District =

Former district of Suzhou, Jiangsu, China

Coordinates: 31°18′09″N 120°37′52″E

Canglang 沧浪区
- District of the People's Republic of China
- 1955–2012
- History
  - Established: 1955
  - Disestablished: 2012
Succeeded by
Gusu District
- Today part of: Part of the Gusu District

Canglang District (simplified Chinese: 沧浪区; traditional Chinese: 滄浪區; pinyin: Cānglàng Qū) is a former district of Suzhou in Jiangsu Province. The district had an area of 30 km^{2} (12 sq mi) and in 2001 the population was around 310,000.

The postal code for Canglang District is 215006 and the telephone code is 0512.

On 1 September 2012, Canglang District was merged with Pingjiang District and Jinchang District to form Gusu District.
