= Wumenqiao Subdistrict =

Wumenqiao Subdistrict 吴门桥街道
- Subdistrict
- Location within Jiangsu Location within China
- Coordinates: 31.28412°N 120.6321°E
- Country: China
- Province: Jiangsu
- City: Suzhou
- District: Gusu District

Area
  - Total: 12.19 km^{2} (4.71 sq mi)

Population (2017)
  - Total: 148,091
  - Density: 12,150/km^{2} (31,460/sq mi)
- Time zone: UTC+8 (China Standard Time)

Wumenqiao Subdistrict (simplified Chinese: 吴门桥街道; traditional Chinese: 吳門橋街道; pinyin: Wúménqiáo Jiēdào) is a subdistrict in Gusu District, Suzhou, Jiangsu, China. The subdistrict spans an area of 12.19 square kilometres (4.71 mi^{2}), and has a population of 148,091.

== History ==
On March 24, 2017, Youxin Subdistrict was merged into Wumenqiao Subdistrict.

== Administrative divisions ==
The subdistrict administers the following 29 residential communities:

- Youlian First Community (Chinese: 友联一社区)
- Youlian Second Community (Chinese: 友联二社区)
- Youlian Third Community (Chinese: 友联三社区)
- Fuxing Community (Chinese: 福星社区)
- Xinkang Community (Chinese: 新康社区)
- Meiting Community (Chinese: 梅亭社区)
- Guxiang Community (Chinese: 姑香社区)
- Xiangya Community (Chinese: 象牙社区)
- Sijijinghua Community (Chinese: 四季晶华社区)
- Xincheng Community (Chinese: 新城社区)
- Youlian Community (Chinese: 友联社区)
- Xinguo Community (Chinese: 新郭社区)
- Shuangqiao Community (Chinese: 双桥社区)
- Fuyun Community (Chinese: 福运社区)
- Nanhuan First Community (Chinese: 南环第一社区)
- Nanhuan Second Community (Chinese: 南环第二社区)
- Nanhuan Third Community (Chinese: 南环第三社区)
- Meichang Community (Chinese: 湄长社区)
- Neima Road Community (Chinese: 内马路社区)
- Xinglongqiao Community (Chinese: 兴隆桥社区)
- Panxi First Community (Chinese: 盘溪第一社区)
- Panxi Second Community (Chinese: 盘溪第二社区)
- Jiefang Community (Chinese: 解放社区)
- Jintang Community (Chinese: 金塘社区)
- Hejiata Community (Chinese: 何家塔社区)
- Runda Community (Chinese: 润达社区)
- Longgangyuan Community (Chinese: 龙港苑社区)
- Dalong Community (Chinese: 大龙社区)
- Nanhua Community (Chinese: 南华社区)

== See also ==
- List of township-level divisions of Suzhou
- Youxin Subdistrict
