= Taohuawu Subdistrict =

Coordinates: 31.31568°N 120.61092°E

Taohuawu Subdistrict 桃花坞街道
- Subdistrict
- Interactive map of Taohuawu Subdistrict
- Country: China
- Province: Jiangsu
- City: Suzhou
- District: Gusu District
- Time zone: UTC+8 (China Standard Time)

Taohuawu Subdistrict (Chinese: 桃花坞街道) is a township-level division of Gusu District, Suzhou, Jiangsu, China.

== See also ==
- List of township-level divisions of Suzhou
