= Shantang Street =

Street in Suzhou, Jiangsu, China

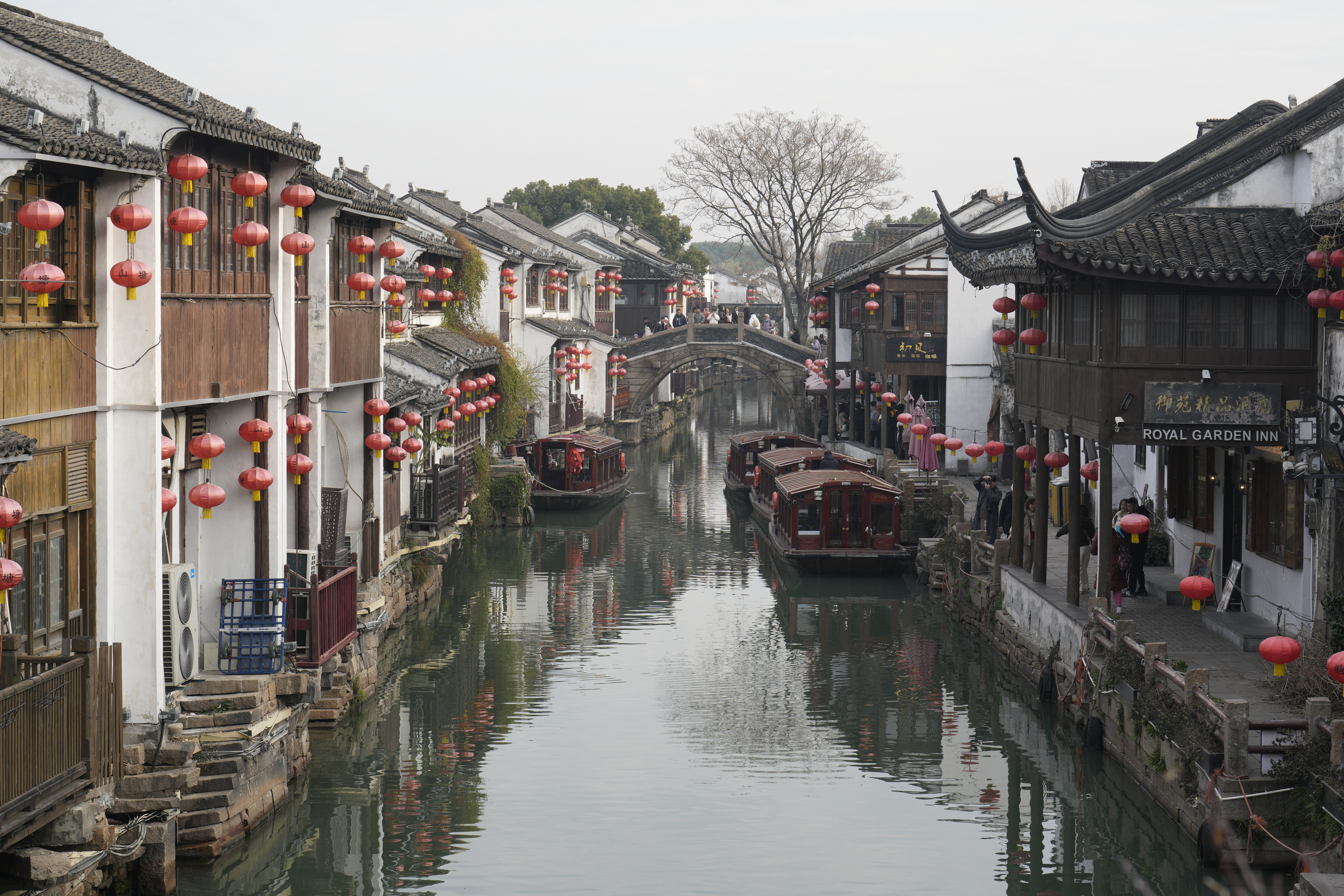
- Shantang Canal
- Native name: 山塘街 (Chinese)
- Length: 3,830 m (12,570 ft)
- Location: Northwestern Gusu District, Suzhou

Construction
- Inauguration: 825 AD

Other
- Status: Complete

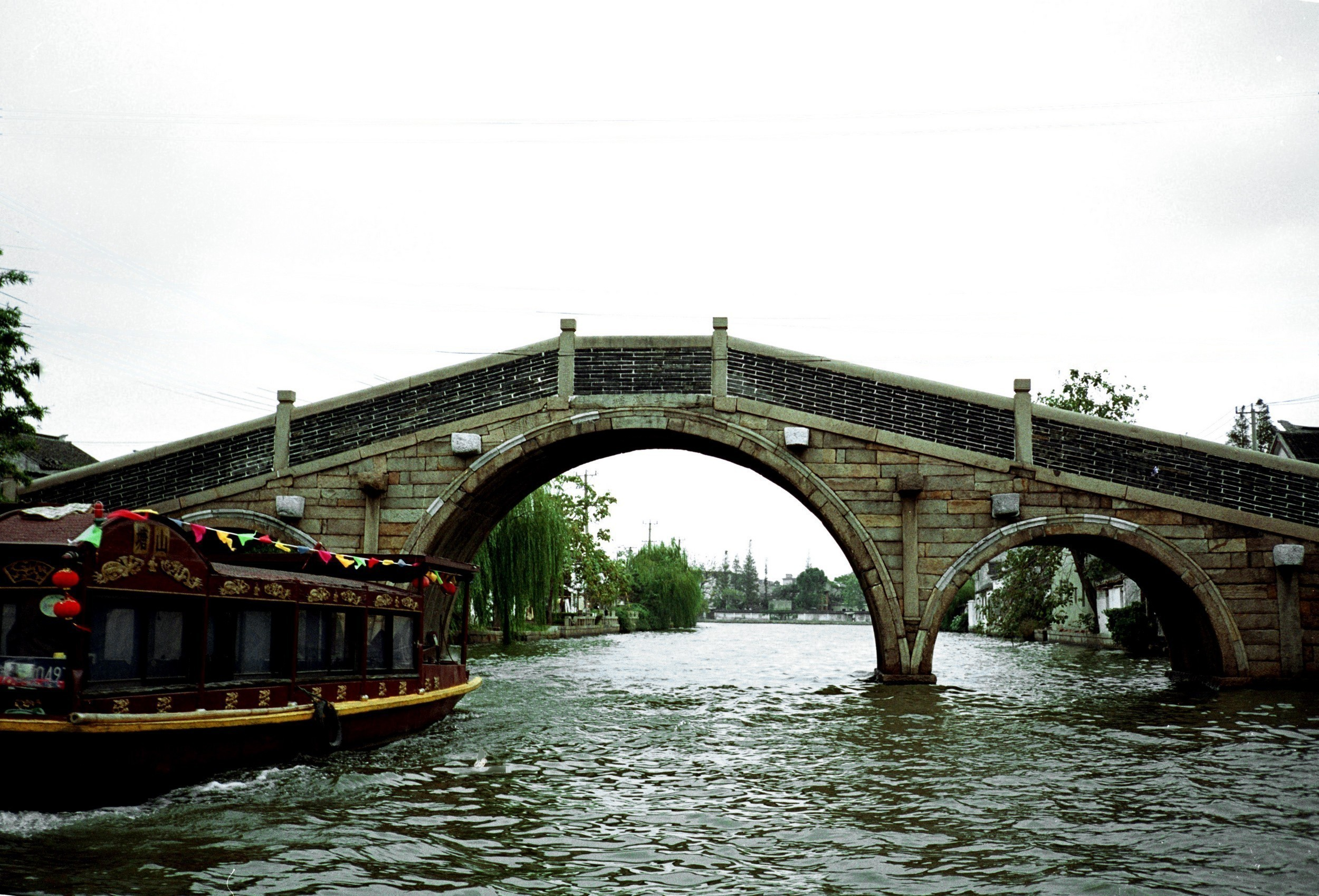
Puji Bridge (普济桥)

Shantang Street (Chinese: 山塘街; pinyin: Shāntáng Jiē; Suzhou Wu, Wugniu: Se^{1} daon^{2} ka^{1}, Wu Chinese pronunciation: [se̞ dɑ̃ kɑ]), also known as Seven-li Shantang (Chinese: 七里山塘), is a street in northwestern Gusu District, Suzhou, Jiangsu, China. The street connects Changmen (Chinese: 阊门) in the east with Huqiu in the west, with a total length of about 3,829.6 meters (2.38 miles), or a little more than seven li or traditional "Chinese miles". Due to the great history and events involving Shantang Street it is sometimes stated as being the "First Street in Shuzou".

In 2015, the Shantang Street Scenic Area was added to the list of China's "National Historic and Cultural Streets".

== History ==
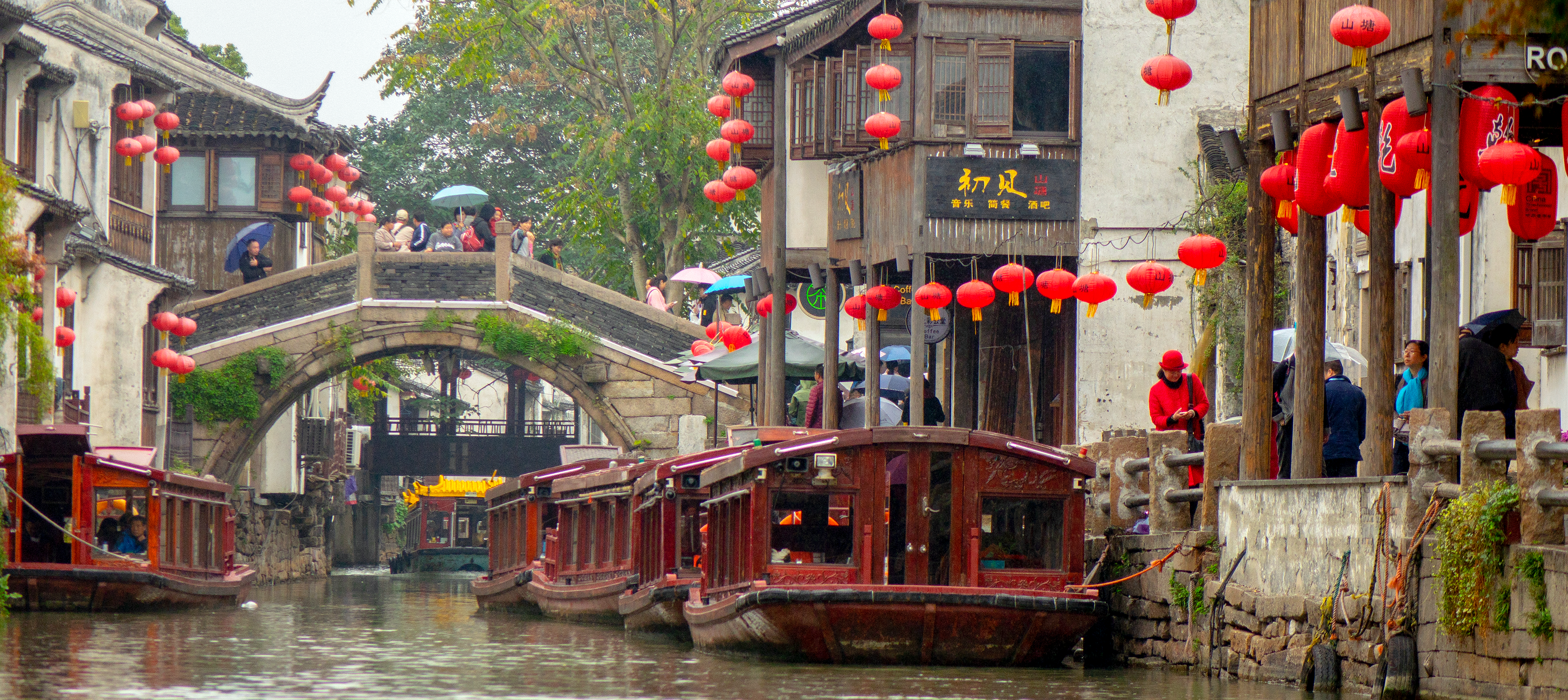
The Tonggui bridge over the canal at Shentang Street

Construction of the Shantang Canal (Chinese: 山塘河) started in 825 AD, during the Tang Dynasty by Bai Juyi, a poet and the Cishi (modern-day equivalent of the prefectural governor) of Suzhou, to provide a link between Huqiu and the city. The sludge that was dug out from the construction formed a dam along the north bank of the canal known as Baigong Dam (Chinese: 白公堤) in honor of Bai Juyi. A street was then built on the dam, which later became the modern-day Shantang Street.

Along with Pingjiang Road, the street was declared a Historical and cultural block of China (Chinese: 中国历史文化街区) in 2015.

Today, it is a popular tourist destination with visitors being attracted by the heritage nature of the buildings and the various old stone bridges.
