= Chengbei Subdistrict, Suzhou =

Coordinates: 31.34079°N 120.60074°E

Chengbei Subdistrict 城北街道
- Subdistrict
- Interactive map of Chengbei Subdistrict
- Country: People's Republic of China
- Province: Jiangsu
- City: Suzhou
- District: Gusu District
- Time zone: UTC+8 (China Standard)

Chengbei Subdistrict (Chinese: 城北街道; pinyin: Chéngběi Jiēdào; lit. 'city north') is a township-level division of Gusu District, Suzhou, Jiangsu, China.

== See also ==
- List of township-level divisions of Suzhou
