= Wei Sijiong =

Chinese public official

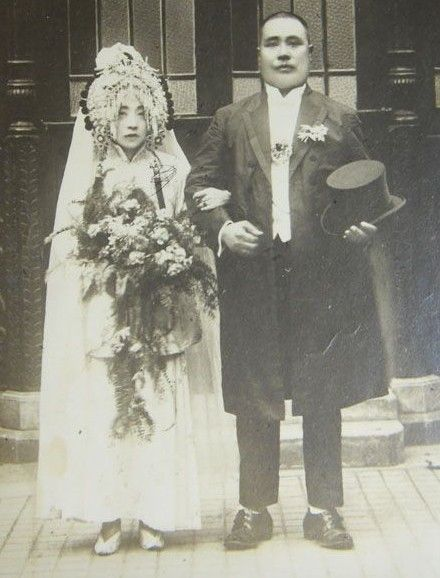
Marriage of Wei Sijiong and Sai Jinhua in 1918

Wei Sijiong (Chinese: 魏斯炅; pinyin: Wèi Sījiǒng; Wade–Giles: Wei Ssu-chiung, 1873-1922), courtesy name (zi) Fuou (traditional Chinese: 阜歐; simplified Chinese: 阜欧; pinyin: Fùōu; Wade–Giles: Fu-ou) was a former head of the Jiangxi Province Bureau of Civil Affairs, and a member of the National Assembly of the Republic of China. His name is often falsely stated to be Siling (斯靈; 斯灵; Sīlíng; Ssu-ling).

Wei, from Jiangxi, studied economics in Japan during the beginning of the 20th century, and he was involved in the 1911 Xinhai Revolution. When he met Sai Jinhua, was the head of Jiangxi Province's tax authority.

On 20 June 1918 he and Sai Jinhua married in Shanghai. Sai Jinhua adopted a hao (an art name, Chinese: 號), Weizhao Lingfei, a combination of her family name and her husband, to illustrate her devotion to him. The couple moved to Peking (Beijing). Wei Sijiong died shortly after Sai Jinhua's mother's 1922 death, and his family refused to allow Sai Jinhua to share his property.
