= Sai Jinhua =

Chinese famous prostitute

- 賽金花
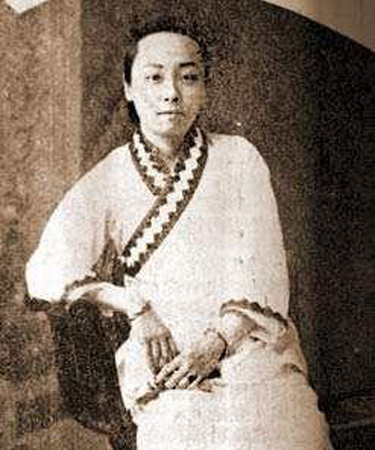
- Sai Jinhua
- Born: Zhao Lingfei; October 9, 1872; Yixian, Huizhou, Anhui, Qing Empire
- Died: December 4, 1936 (aged 64); Beiping, Republic of China
- Other names: Fu Caiyun; Hong Mengluan; Cao Menglan; Sai Jinhua; Weizhao Lingfei
- Occupations: Courtesan (prostitute), Procuring (prostitution)
- Spouse(s): 1. Hong Jun (m. 1888); 2.; Huang (m. 1908): 3. Wei Sijiong (m. 1918)
- Children: Deguan (1890-1908)

Sai Jinhua
- Traditional Chinese: 賽金花
- Simplified Chinese: 赛金花
- Literal meaning: Prettier Than Golden Flower
Transcriptions
Standard Mandarin
- Hanyu Pinyin: Sài Jīnhuā
- Wade–Giles: Sai4 Chin1-hua1

Fu Caiyun
- Traditional Chinese: 傅彩雲
- Simplified Chinese: 傅彩云
Transcriptions
Standard Mandarin
- Hanyu Pinyin: Fù Cǎiyún
- Wade–Giles: Fu4 Ts'ai3-yün2

Weizhao Lingfei
- Traditional Chinese: 魏趙靈飛
- Simplified Chinese: 魏赵灵飞
Transcriptions
Standard Mandarin
- Hanyu Pinyin: Wèizhào Língfēi
- Wade–Giles: Wei4-chao4 Ling2-fei1

Cao Menglan
- Traditional Chinese: 曹夢蘭
- Simplified Chinese: 曹梦兰
Transcriptions
Standard Mandarin
- Hanyu Pinyin: Cáo Mènglán
- Wade–Giles: Ts'ao2 Meng4-lan2

Sai Erye
- Traditional Chinese: 賽二爺
- Simplified Chinese: 赛二爷
- Literal meaning: Second Master Sai
Transcriptions
Standard Mandarin
- Hanyu Pinyin: Sài èryé
- Wade–Giles: Sai4 erh4-yeh2

Sai Jinhua (Chinese: 賽金花; October 9, 1872 — December 4, 1936) was a Chinese prostitute who became an acquaintance of Alfred von Waldersee, a German field marshal. Her real family name was Cao or Zhao. During her career, she used the names Fu Caiyun (傅彩雲), Sai Jinhua, and Cao Menglan (曹夢蘭). Her art name (hao) was Weizhao Lingfei (魏趙靈飛). Some people referred to her as Sai Erye (賽二爺).

In an encyclopedia article, Wenxian Zhang wrote that Sai Jinhua "was regarded by some as a cross-cultural courtesan". In another, Wan Xianchu wrote: "Regardless of whether Sai Jinhua's role in China's foreign relations may have been exaggerated and despite the controversies surrounding her conduct and affairs, she lived a tough and spectacular life that has assured her a place in the modern history of China."

== Early life ==
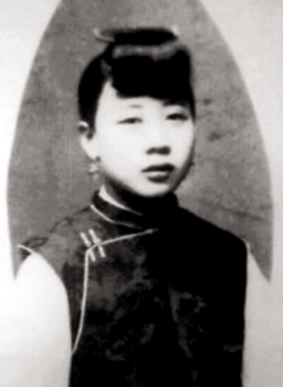
Sai Jinhua in 1887

Sai Jinhua was allegedly born with the name Zhao Lingfei (趙靈飛; 赵灵飞; Zhào Língfēi; Chao Ling-fei) on October 9, 1872. Sai Jinhua was from Yixian, Huizhou, Anhui, she and her father moved to Suzhou as a child. Her ancestral home was Xiuning, Anhui. At age 13 she became a prostitute after her father died and financial difficulties for her family occurred. She first became a prostitute while on a flower boat. At that time she used the professional name "Fu Caiyun". In 1887, Hong Jun, a major Chinese official, met Sai Jinhua while he visited Suzhou. At the time Hong Jun was in mourning due to his mother's death. Hong Jun made Sai Jinhua his concubine one year after meeting her. After becoming a concubine, Sai Jinhua began using the name Hong Mengluan (洪夢鸞; 洪梦鸾; Hóng Mèngluán; Hung Meng-luan). In April 1887, Sai Jinhua went to Beijing with Hong Jun.

Empress Dowager Cixi appointed Hong Jun as the Chinese envoy to Europe, and so Hong Jun traveled to Russia, Austria, the Netherlands, and Germany as part of his diplomatic duties. Sai Jinhua accompanied him for the five year term because Hong Jun's wife was unwilling to travel with him. Sai Jinhua lived in Europe for three years.

In Berlin, Hong Jun did not allow Sai Jinhua to attend most of his parties, including those that he held at his residence. She was unable to dance at the parties she did attend due to her bound feet and because Hong Jun asked her not to. Wenxian Zhang, author of the Encyclopedia of Prostitution and Sex Work, Volume 2, wrote that when Sai Jinhua was in Berlin, she reportedly became the acquaintance of Alfred von Waldersee. David Der-wei Wang, author of Fin-de-siècle Splendor: Repressed Modernities of Late Qing Fiction, 1849-1911, wrote that the affair between Sai Jinhua and Waldersee began at that point as legends have it. In addition to Waldersee, she met Emperor William II, Chancellor Otto von Bismarck, and German Empress Victoria in Berlin. She also visited St. Petersburg, Vienna, The Hague, Paris, and London. After the end of the diplomatic tour, the couple moved to Beijing.

Sai Jinhua gave birth to her daughter Deguan (德官; Déguān; Te-kuan) in 1890. Hong Jun died in 1893, shortly after his return to China. In 1894 Sai Jinhua became a prostitute again because Hong Jun's relatives did not support her financially. Sai Jinhua and her daughter Deguan had accompanied the coffin of Hong Jun as it was returned to Suzhou. When she resumed her prostitution career she used the stage name "Cao Menglan". She became a celebrity since she had been in a relationship with a Chinese envoy to Europe. In 1898, she had to move her business out of Shanghai. After re-establishing it in Tianjin she took the name "Sai Jinhua". Several years after restarting her prostitution career she started the Golden Flower Troupe (金花班; Jīnhuā bān; Chin-hua pan), a prostitute high-end brothel. This brothel became known in Beijing and Tianjin. Her prostitution business moved to Beijing in 1899.

== Boxer Rebellion ==
In 1900, Waldersee became the chief commander of the occupation army after the end of the Boxer Rebellion. Sai Jinhua renewed her connection with Waldersee. Ying Hu, author of Tales of Translation: Composing the New Woman in China, 1899-1918, stated that Waldersee much favored Sai Jinhua allegedly due to her proficiency in several European languages. Ying Hu wrote that she allegedly tried and sometimes succeeded in curbing the brutality of the troops through her bedside conversations with Waldersee. Wenxian Zhang wrote that Sai Jinhua "was credited with influencing Waldsee [sic] to moderate the harsh treatment of Beijing residents". After the end of the Boxer-related hostilities, Sai Jinhua continued to be a prostitute. Wenxian Zhang wrote that the Qing Dynasty government was not grateful for her efforts.

Fan Zengxiang wrote some poems about Sai Jinhua and Waldersee. David Der-wei Wang wrote that the poems consolidated the legend. The poem repeated a rumor stating that the two were in the palace of the Empress Dowager and that they ran out of it naked when a fire occurred. Sai Jinhua admitted in her autobiography that she was on good terms with Waldersee but, as stated by Hu Ying, she vigorously disputed that she had a sexual relationship with him. David Wang wrote that because of several reasons, including differences in political concerns, social status, and age, it was unlikely that a romance between the two happened. Wang further explained: "It is believed, however, that Sai Jinhua might have had contacts with some lower-ranking German officers at the time, thanks to her ability to speak a little German."

== Later life ==
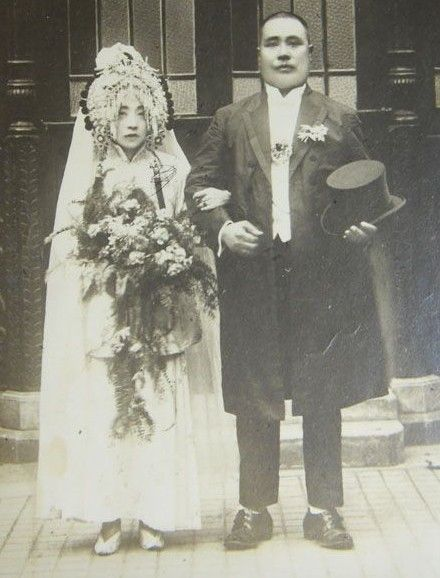
Sai Jinhua's marriage to Wei Sijiong in 1918

In 1903, along Shaanxi Lane, Sai Jinhua created a Nanban, or a southern prostitute troupe. She capitalized on the rumors of her romance with Waldersee and became very popular. In 1905 Fengling, a prostitute working under Sai Jinhua's direction, committed suicide, Authorities charged Sai Jinhua of torturing Fengling, causing her to commit suicide. She was placed in prison due to the charge and spent most of her funds having the charges reduced to manslaughter. Sai Jinhua was expelled from Beijing, and therefore banished to her hometown. In 1908, her daughter Deguan died.

In 1908, Sai Jinhua married a railroad official, Huang. Huang died during the beginning of the Republican Era. Afterwards she lived with a Mr. Cao. Subsequently, she married a member of the National Assembly, Wei Sijiong, a former head of the Jiangxi Province Bureau of Civil Affairs, in Shanghai, on 20 June 1918. Sai Jinhua adopted the art name (hao) Weizhao Lingfei, which used a combination of her family name with that of her husband, to show her devotion to him. The couple moved to Beijing (then romanized as Peking). Sai Jinhua's mother died in 1922. Wei Sijiong, Sai Jinhua's husband, died shortly afterwards and his family refused to allow Sai Jinhua to share his property. Sai Jinhua began smoking opium and she lived in solitude in her remaining years. Sai Jinhua, who was in poverty at the time of her death, subsisted off of the money curious historians and journalists gave her.

Sai Jinhua died on December 4, 1936, succumbing to an illness at 62 sui. At the time of her death, Beijing (then known as Beiping) was experiencing a strong winter. A servant found her body the morning after her death. Sai Jinhua was buried in Beijing. Qi Baishi, a well-known calligrapher, crafted her headstone.

== Legacy ==
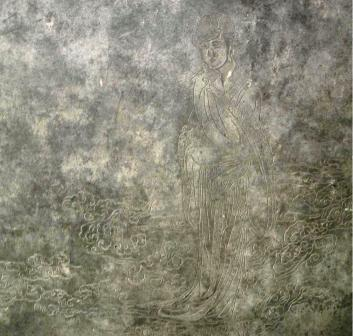
Carving of Sai Jinhua on her gravestone

The life of Sai Jinhua had been adapted into several films, plays, and television series. In works she is portrayed as a heroine of the Chinese nation who saved the country single-handedly during a time of crisis or as a yaonie (妖孽; yāoniè; yao-nie), a woman with abnormal powers or a female demon. Ying Hu, author of Tales of Translation: Composing the New Woman in China, 1899-1918, wrote that Sai Jinhua "is often portrayed in extreme colors" in fiction.

Ying Hu wrote that "portraits of Sai Jinhua in the first decade of the twentieth century tended to be ambivalent, if not outright censorious". Hu Baoyu (胡寶玉; 胡宝玉; Hú Bǎoyù; Hu Pao-yü) by Wu Jianren and Fantianlu conglu (梵天廬叢錄; 梵天庐丛录; Fàntiānlú Cónglù; Fan-t'ien-lu Ts'ung-lu; "Anecdotes Collected from the Fantianlu Studio") refer to her negatively. The character Fu Caiyun in Niehai Hua is based on Sai Jinhua. Ying Hu wrote that Sai Jinhua's portrayal in that work was "resolutely ambiguous". In the serialized novel The Nine-tailed Turtle by Zhang Chunfan, the main character Zhang Qiugu has sexual intercourse with Sai Jinhua. Unlike other portrayals of Sai Jinhua in fiction, in The Nine-tailed Turtle she is portrayed as past her prime.

Beginning in the 1930s several works portrayed Sai Jinhua in a positive manner. In 1933 Liu Bannong, a professor of Chinese literature at Peking University, conducted an interview with Sai Jinhua. He wrote The Wife of Zhuangyuan: Sai Jinhua, which he called her true story.

Xia Yan's seven-act play Sai Jinhua was a popular success and an example of the national defense drama genre. The writing on the play's title page, "The country is everyone's country; to save the country is everyone's duty", is in Sai Jinhua's own handwriting.

Jung Chang wrote that Sai Jinhua was "regarded by many as something of a tragic heroine".

The play The Beauty (simplified Chinese: 风华绝代; traditional Chinese: 風華絕代; pinyin: Fēnghuá Juédài) is about Sai Jinhua. In 2012, Chinese actress Liu Xiaoqing played Sai Jinhua in a performance of The Beauty. Chang Dai-chien, a painter, made a stone engraving portrait of Sai Jinhua.
