= Pingjiang District =

Former district of Suzhou, Jiangsu, China

Coordinates: 31°18′50″N 120°37′47″E

Pingjiang 平江区
- District of the People's Republic of China
- 1955–2012
- History
  - Established: 1955
  - Disestablished: 2012
Succeeded by
Gusu District
- Today part of: Part of the Gusu District, Suzhou, Jiangsu

Pingjiang District (simplified Chinese: 平江区; traditional Chinese: 平江區; pinyin: Píngjiāng Qū) is a former district of Suzhou in Jiangsu Province. The district had an area of 25 km^{2} (9.7 sq mi) and in 2001 the population was around 180,000.

The postal code for Pingjiang District is 215005 and the telephone code is 0512.

On 1 September 2012, Pingjiang District was merged with Canglang District and Jinchang District to form Gusu District.

== Gallery ==
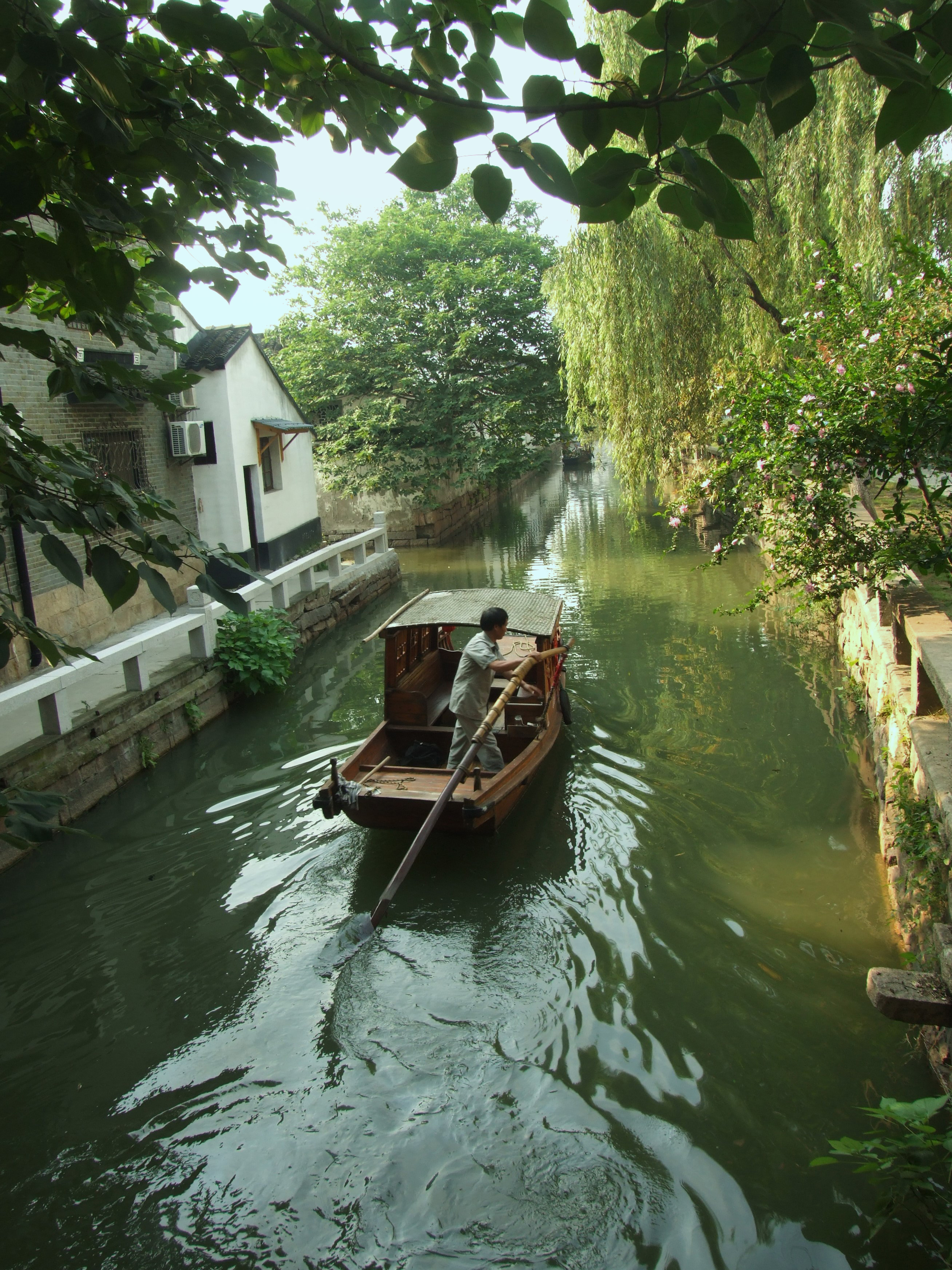
A river by the side of Pingjiang Road

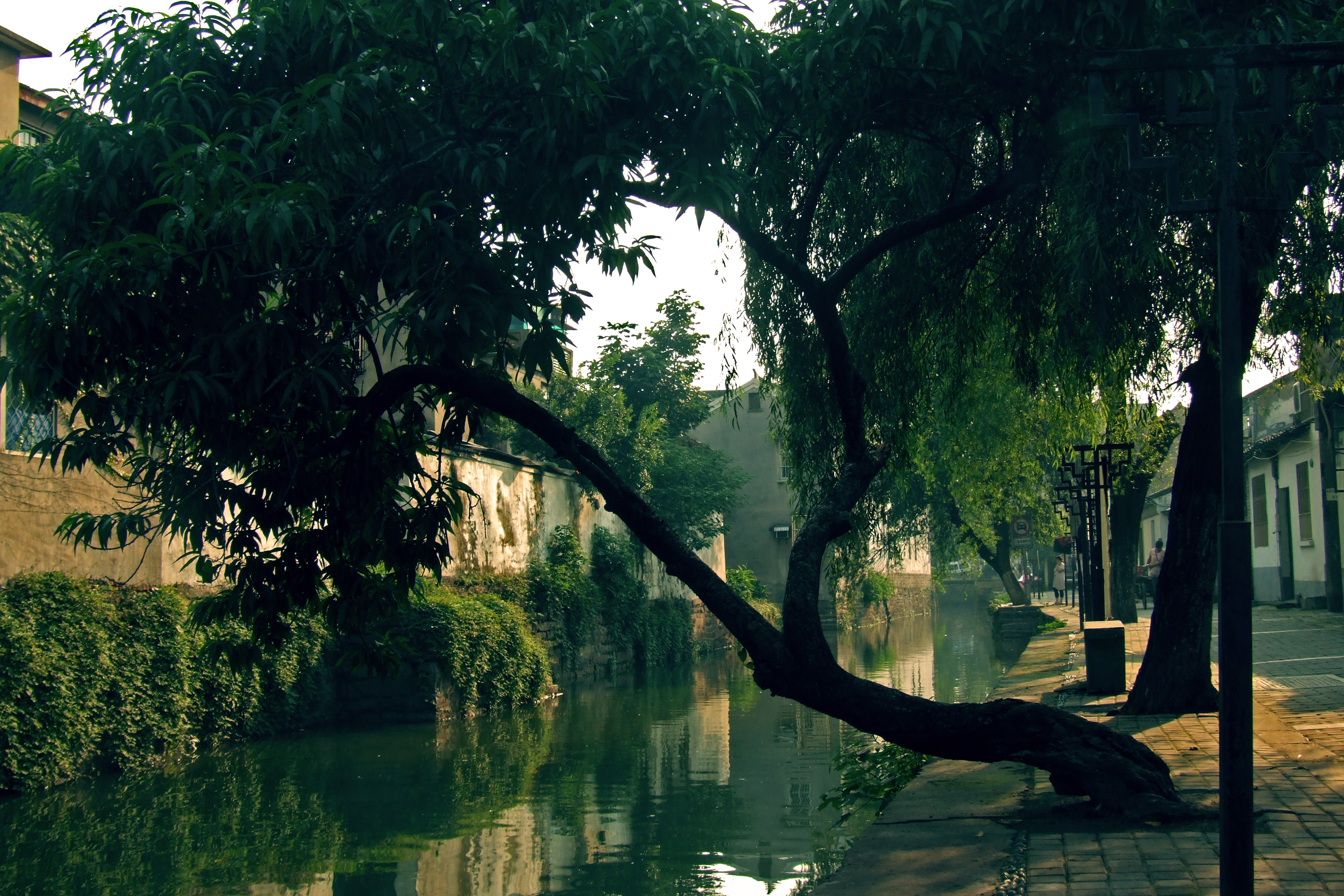
An old area near Pingjiang Road

== See also ==
- Pingjiang Road
