= Momi cafe =

Coffee house in Pingjiang Road, China

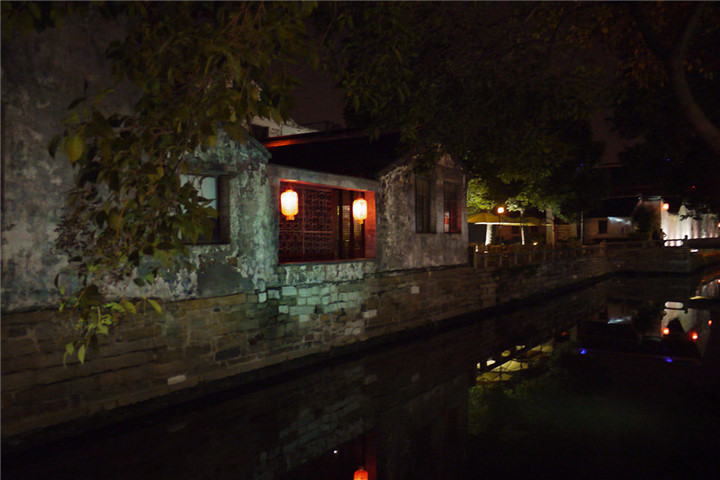
A part of Pingjiang Road taken at night

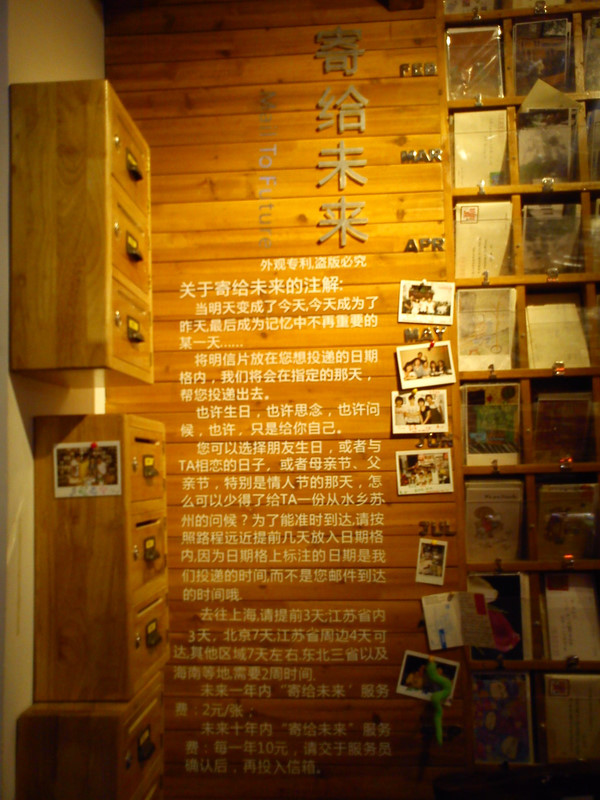
The "Mail to Future" wall at Momi cafe

Momi Café (Chinese: 猫的天空之城; pinyin: MāodeTiānKōngzhīChéng) is a coffee house located in Pingjiang Road in Suzhou, China. It has many branches, including stores in Wuxi, Shanghai, Xitang and many other cities.

== Overview ==
The cafe is famous for its handmade milk tea called Siwa milk tea. Known for its natural ingredients, it has no additives and is made from imported materials. Two examples are the Hong Kong silk stocking milk tea, and the British Earl Grey Tea.

The cafe sells books covering three categories: travel, art, and literature. It sells magazines such as 02 life, little thing, and DuKu.

Another notable aspect of the cafe is the wall called "Mail to Future". There are 365 slots on this wall, and each slot corresponds with one day in a year. Patrons can choose a postcard, write down the receiver’s name and address, and put it into any slot and the postcard will be sent on that day. The wall is a treasure of the market town and it is also known as the only one around China. Additionally, all of the postcards are designed by the shopkeepers. With the help of many friends, there are almost 300 different kinds of postcards that have come out and most of them are related to Suzhou.

== Gallery ==
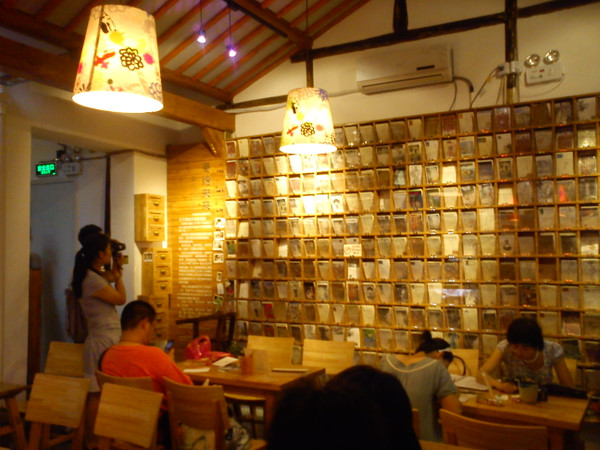
Postcards

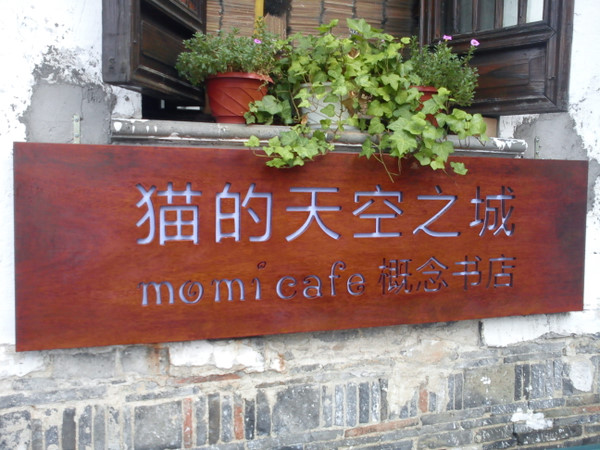
Sign

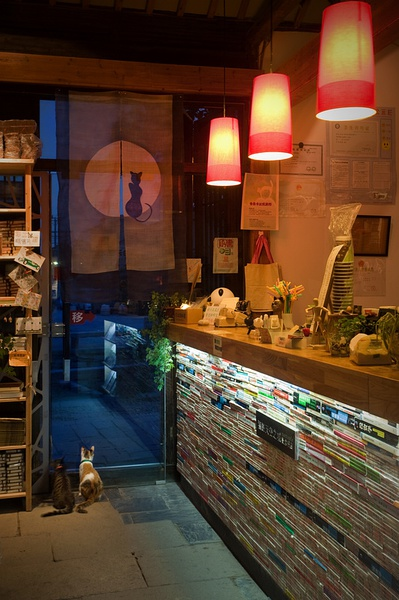
Doorway

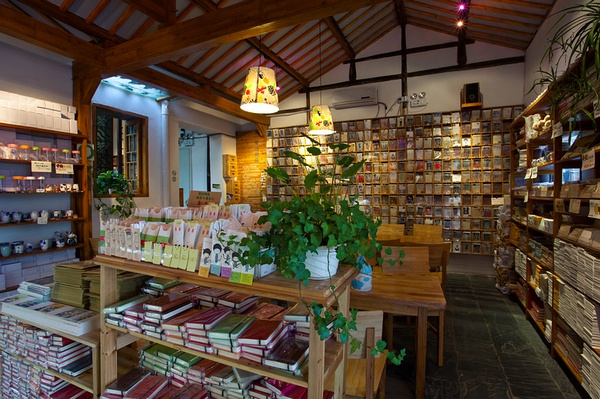
View

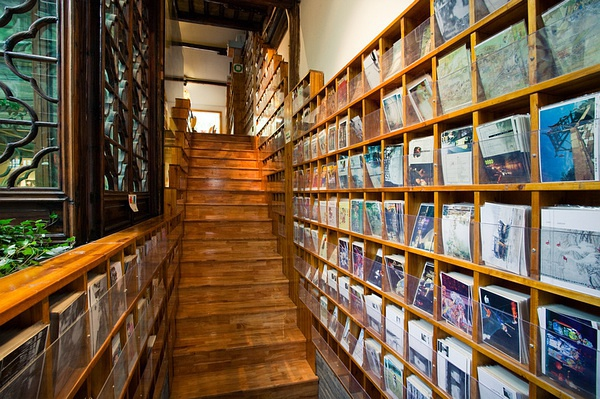
The way to the second floor

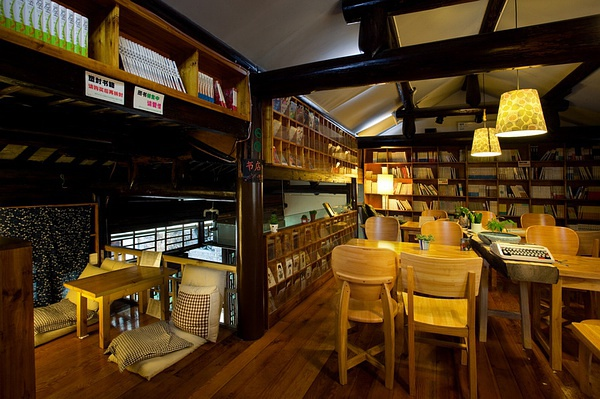
The second floor

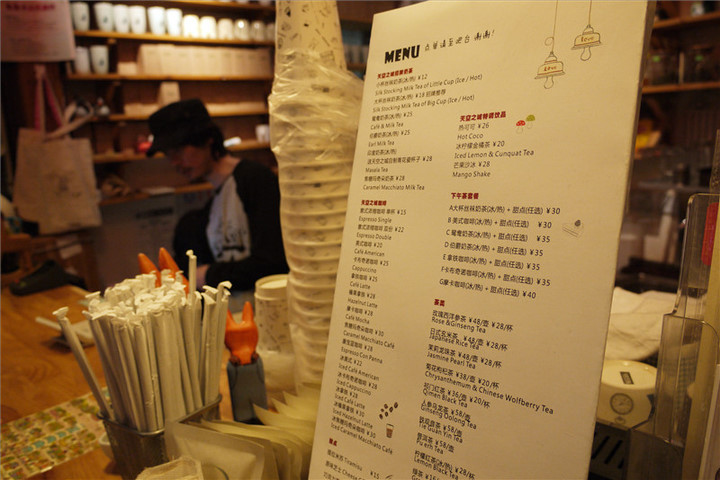
Menu

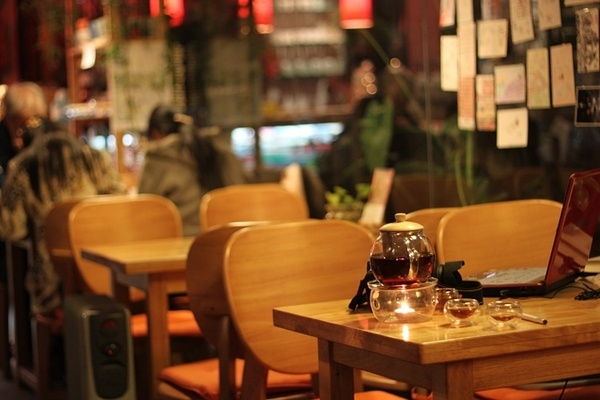
View

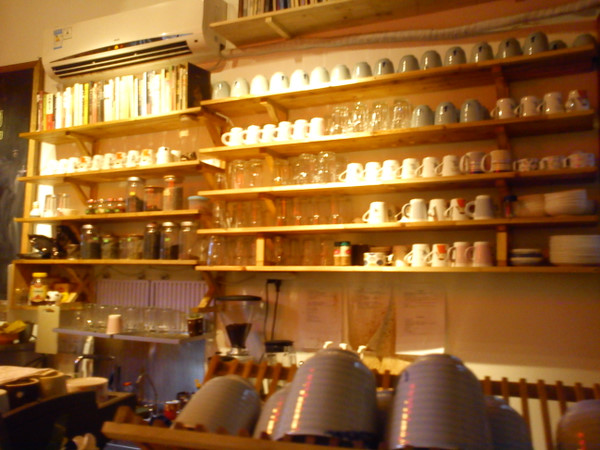
Decoratings behind the counter
