= Jinchang Subdistrict =

Coordinates: 31.3063°N 120.57531°E

Jinchang Subdistrict 金阊街道
- Subdistrict
- Interactive map of Jinchang Subdistrict
- Country: China
- Province: Jiangsu
- City: Suzhou
- District: Gusu District
- Time zone: UTC+8 (China Standard Time)

Jinchang Subdistrict (Chinese: 金阊街道) is a township-level division of Gusu District, Suzhou, Jiangsu, China.

== See also ==
- List of township-level divisions of Suzhou
