= Pingjiang Subdistrict =

Coordinates: 31.31439°N 120.62965°E

Pingjiang Subdistrict 平江街道
- Subdistrict
- Interactive map of Pingjiang Subdistrict
- Country: China
- Province: Jiangsu
- City: Suzhou
- District: Gusu District
- Time zone: UTC+8 (China Standard Time)

Pingjiang Subdistrict (Chinese: 平江街道) is a township-level division of Gusu District, Suzhou, Jiangsu, China.

== See also ==
- List of township-level divisions of Suzhou
