= Gusu, Suzhou =

Gusu 姑苏区
- District
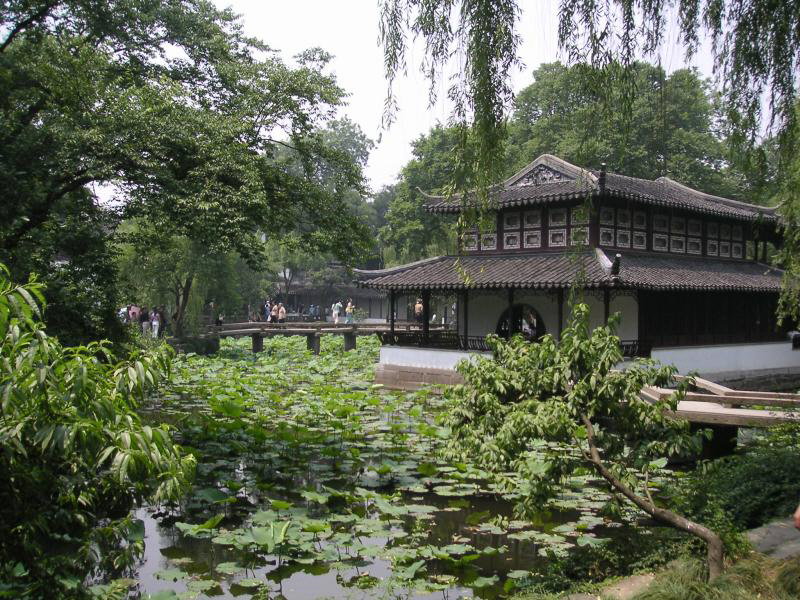
- Humble Administrator's Garden

- Location in Jiangsu
- Coordinates: 31°19′09″N 120°35′30″E
- Country: People's Republic of China
- Province: Jiangsu
- Prefecture-level city: Suzhou
- Formed: 1 September 2012

Area
  - Total: 85.1 km^{2} (32.9 sq mi)

Population (2020)
  - Total: 958,000
  - Density: 11,300/km^{2} (29,200/sq mi)
- Time zone: UTC+8 (China Standard)
- Postal code: 215008

Gusu District (simplified Chinese: 姑苏区; traditional Chinese: 姑蘇區; pinyin: Gūsū Qū) is one of five urban districts and the main district of Suzhou, Jiangsu province, China. It was created on 1 September 2012 by the merger of the three former districts of Canglang, Pingjiang, and Jinchang.

== Administrative divisions ==
As of 2020, Gusu District has the following 8 subdistricts:

- Baiyangwan Subdistrict
- Pingjiang Subdistrict
- Jinchang Subdistrict
- Canglang Subdistrict
- Shuangta Subdistrict
- Huqiu Subdistrict
- Sujin Subdistrict
- Wumenqiao Subdistrict

=== Historical divisions ===
As of 2011, the three districts which formed Gusu District had 17 subdistricts and 3 towns.

Former Canglang District	Former Jinchang District	Former Pingjiang District
Shuangta Subdistrict (双塔街道)	Shilu Subdistrict (石路街道)	Guanqian Subdistrict (观前街道)
Nanmen Subdistrict (南门街道)	Caixiang Subdistrict (彩香街道)	Pingjiang Road Subdistrict (平江路街道)
Xujiang Subdistrict (胥江街道)	Liuyuan Subdistrict (留园街道)	Sujin Subdistrict (苏锦街道)
Wumenqiao Subdistrict (吴门桥街道)	Huqiu Subdistrict (虎丘街道)	Loumen Subdistrict (娄门街道)
Fengmen Subdistrict (葑门街道)	Baiyangwan Subdistrict (白洋湾街道)	Chengbei Subdistrict (城北街道)
Youxin Subdistrict (友新街道)		Taohuawu Subdistrict (桃花坞街道)
		Loufeng (娄葑镇)
		Weiting (唯亭镇)
		Shengpu (胜浦镇)

== See also ==
- Guanqian Street
- Pingjiang Road
- Shantang Street
- Tiger Hill
