= Guanqian Street =

Local street in China

Guanqian Street (Chinese: 观前街; pinyin: guàn qián jiē; Suzhou Wu, Wugniu: Kuoe^{5} zie^{2} ka^{1}, Wu Chinese pronunciation: [kuø zɪ kɑ]) is a street in Suzhou, Jiangsu Province, China. The street is located in Suzhou city centre, an area covering 0.52 square kilometres, the commercial part of the city.

== History ==
It is an old street consisting of a Grand Taoist Building group, which has a long history of more than 1300 years. The Temple of the Lord has nine rooms and its name is Sanqing Temple. Besides, there are about ten temples along the street. The street is named for a temple—Xuanmiao Temple, which is on the street, because it is in front of the temple. This street has existed since 1930 and has been renovated many times since then. In June 1982, the street was designated by the municipal authority as a “walking street” and a new night market was established. The street has been honoured as one of the Four Most Famous Walking Streets in China (other three: Nanjing's Fuzimiao, Shanghai's Cheng Huang Miao and Beijing's Tianqiao).

== Development ==
Lying in the city center of Suzhou, the main theme of the street involves eating, shopping and entertaining. There are hundreds of shops, restaurants, bars, stores and clubs in old fashioned structures surrounded by colorful signs and neon lights along the street. The location of this 150-year-old street lying in front of the Xuanmiao Taoist temple explains its name, which means "before a temple". The street running 760 metres long, consists of the eastern, middle and western sections. The eastern part is filled with nice ancient buildings of historical significance. The middle is mainly the temple and fashionable shops occupy the western part. Strolling on Guanqian Street is a favorite pastime of the locals. Now, the restored street attracts not only Suzhou people but also visitors, as it is an attraction blending business, culture, religion and food delights.

== Century-old shops ==
There are many features of the street, including the famous century-old shops such as Huangtianyuan, Sanwanchang, Caizhizhai and so on, which gain an international reputation. It is precisely the existence of these century-old shops that make the Guanqian Street not only become a typical commercial street, but also illustrate the culture of Suzhou. Tourists at home and broad are attracted by these century-old shops because there is variety of Jiangnan dishes available in those century-old shops. Meanwhile, some of the shops have a long history of more than 100 years, which gives the tourists deep impressions and many of the tourists visiting Guanqian street just come to enjoy the delicious food.

== Scenic spots ==
=== Xuanmiao Temple ===
The Guanqian street is named after the Xuanmiao Temple which is located on the street. It is a prominent Taoist temple with a long history dating back to 276 and it was founded in the Western Jin dynasty. Its original name is Zhenqingdao Yard. In 1264, it was renamed Xuanmiao Temple. At the beginning of the Qing dynasty, in order to avoid naming taboo associated with the Kangxi Emperor's personal name, it was renamed again. An old laneway leads to the gate of the temple while the Guanqian pedestrian street lies just ahead of it.

== Gallery ==
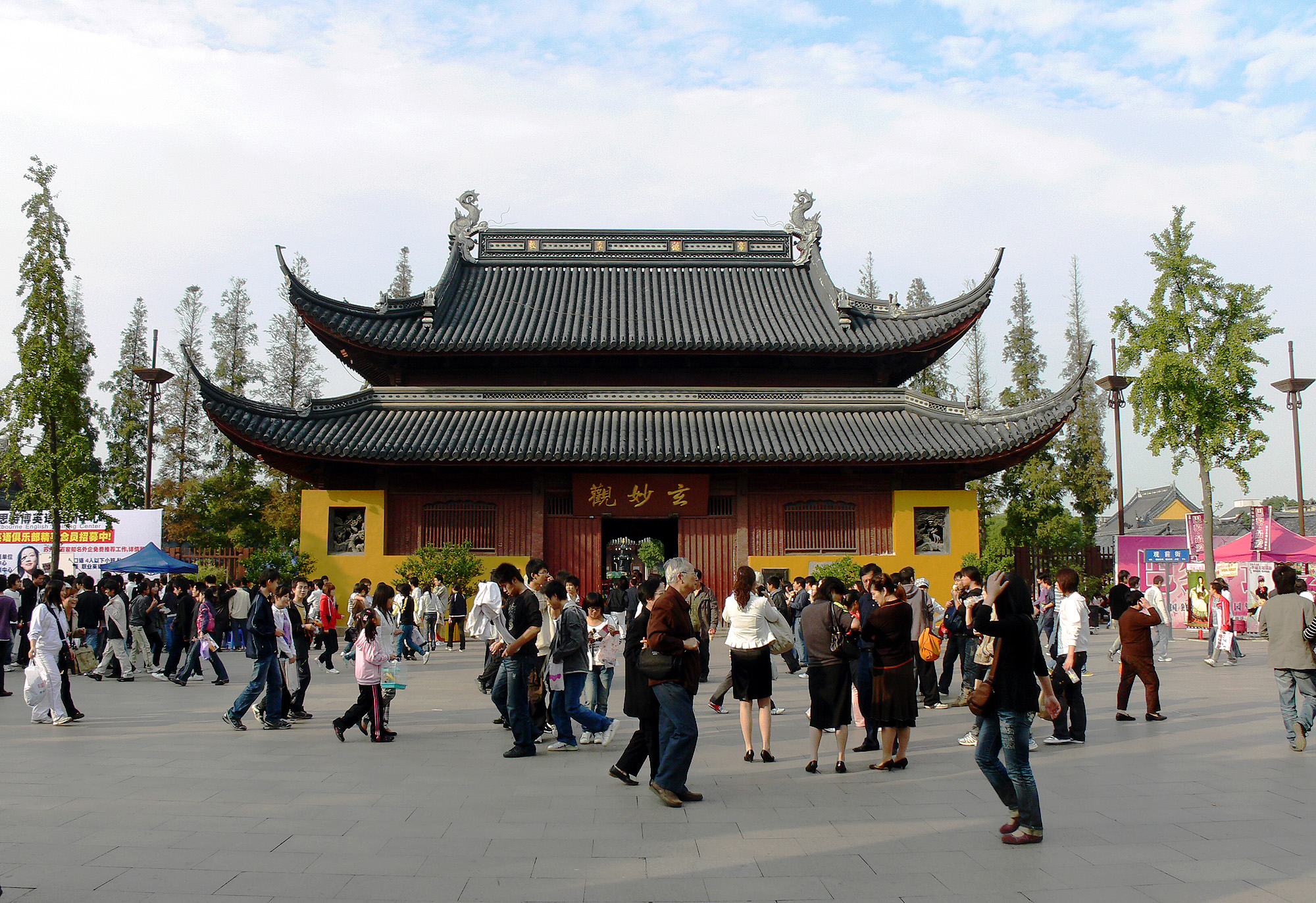
Xuanmiao Temple

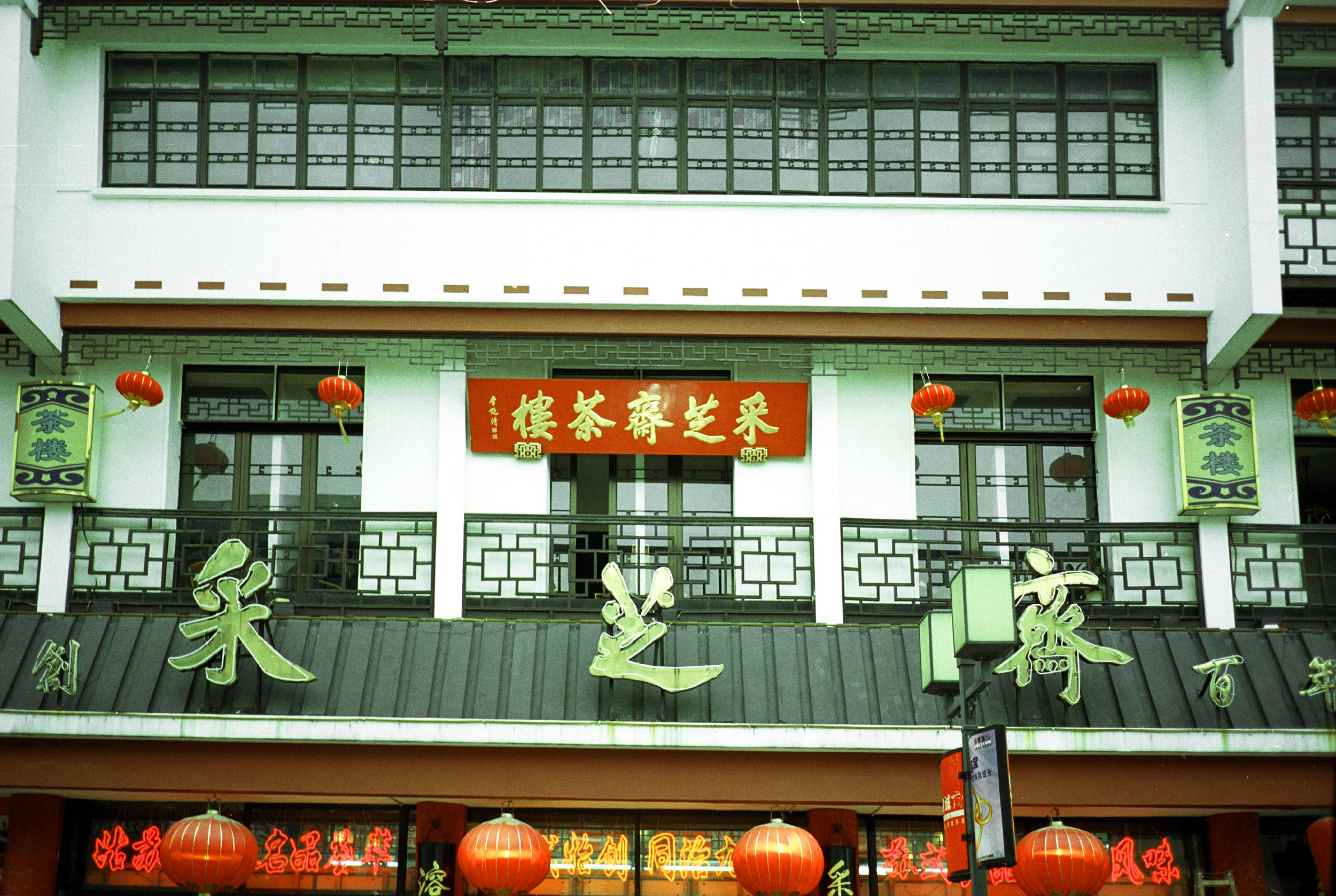
Caizhizhai

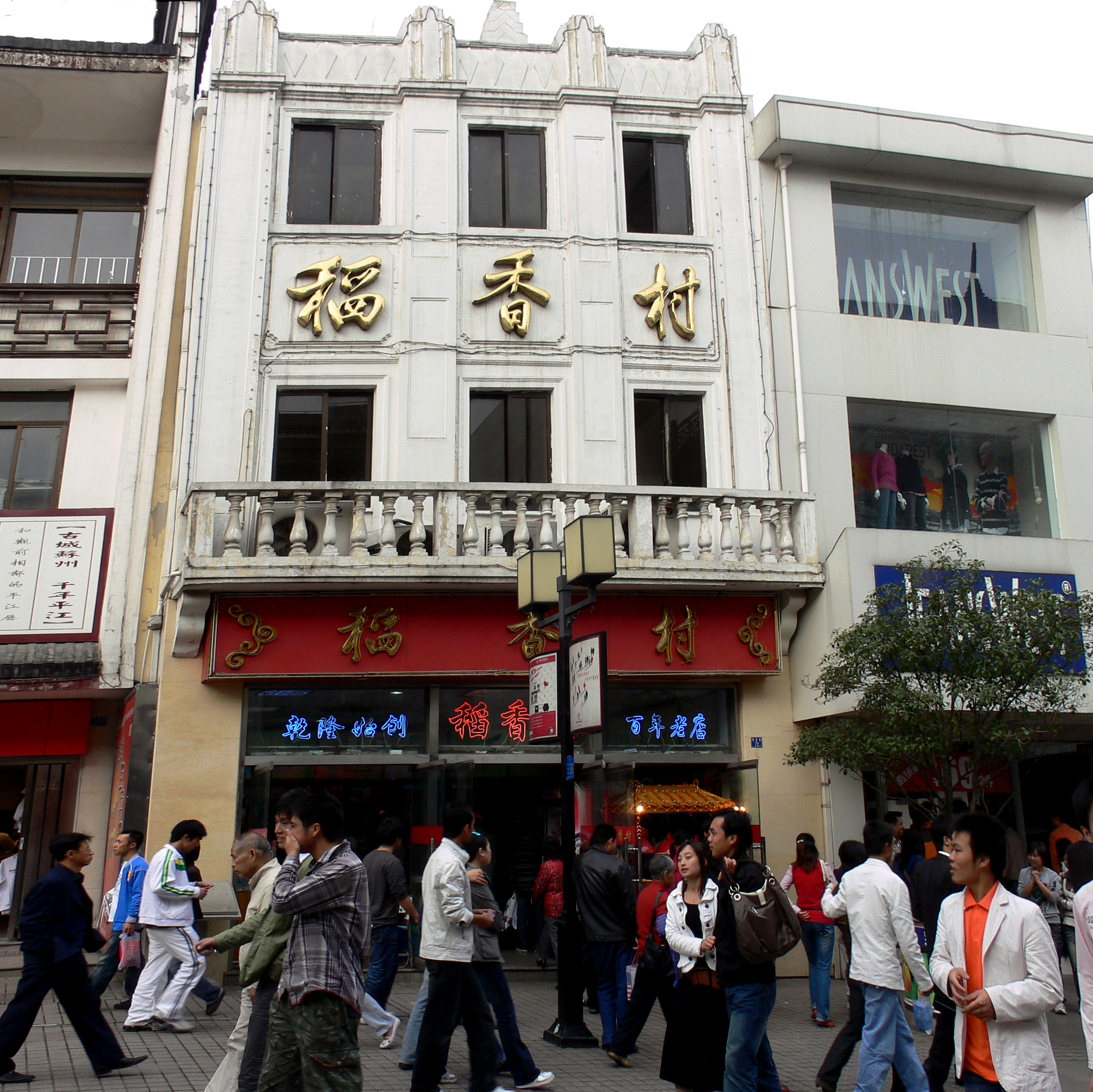
Daoxiangcun

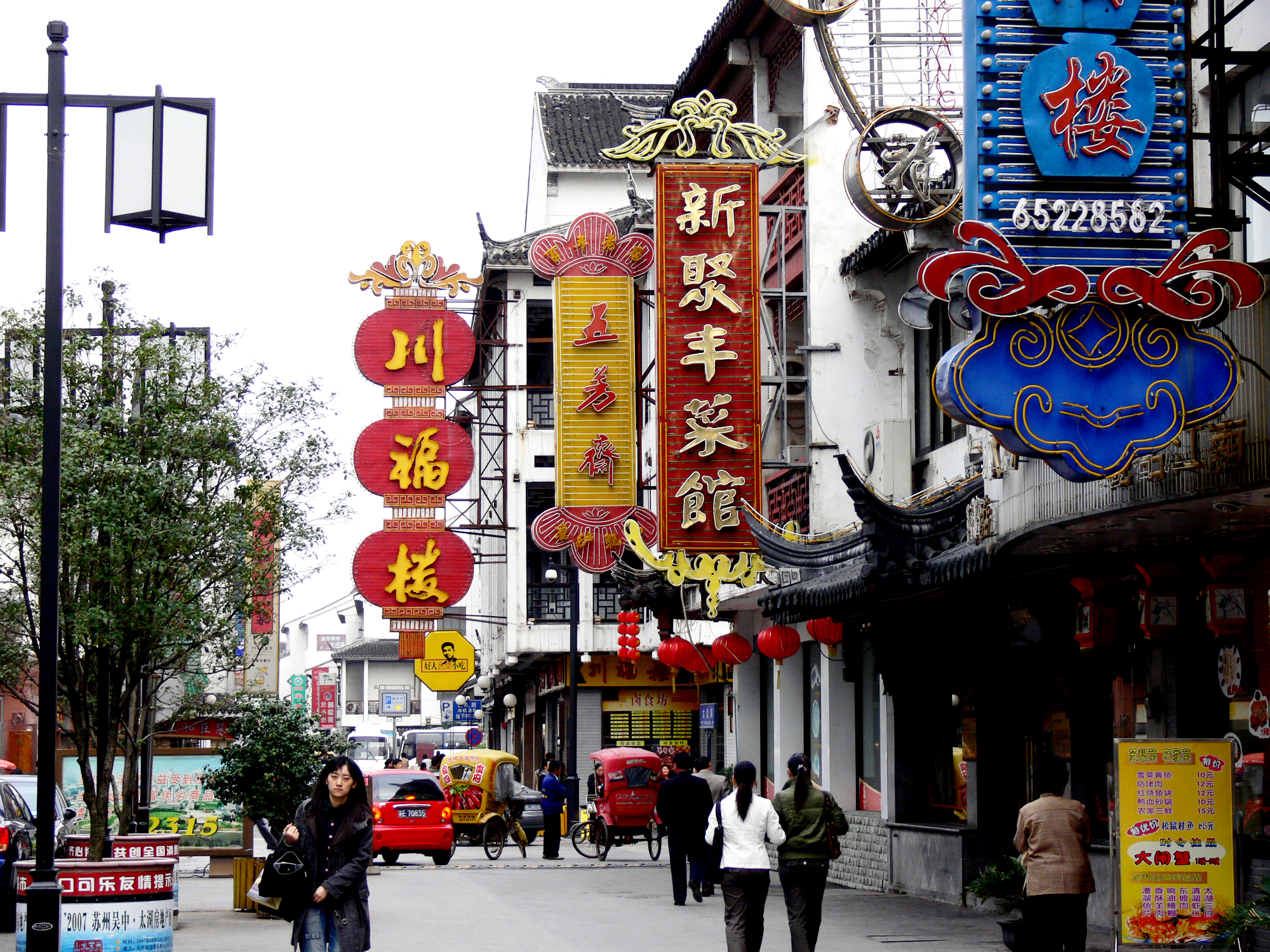
Taijian Long

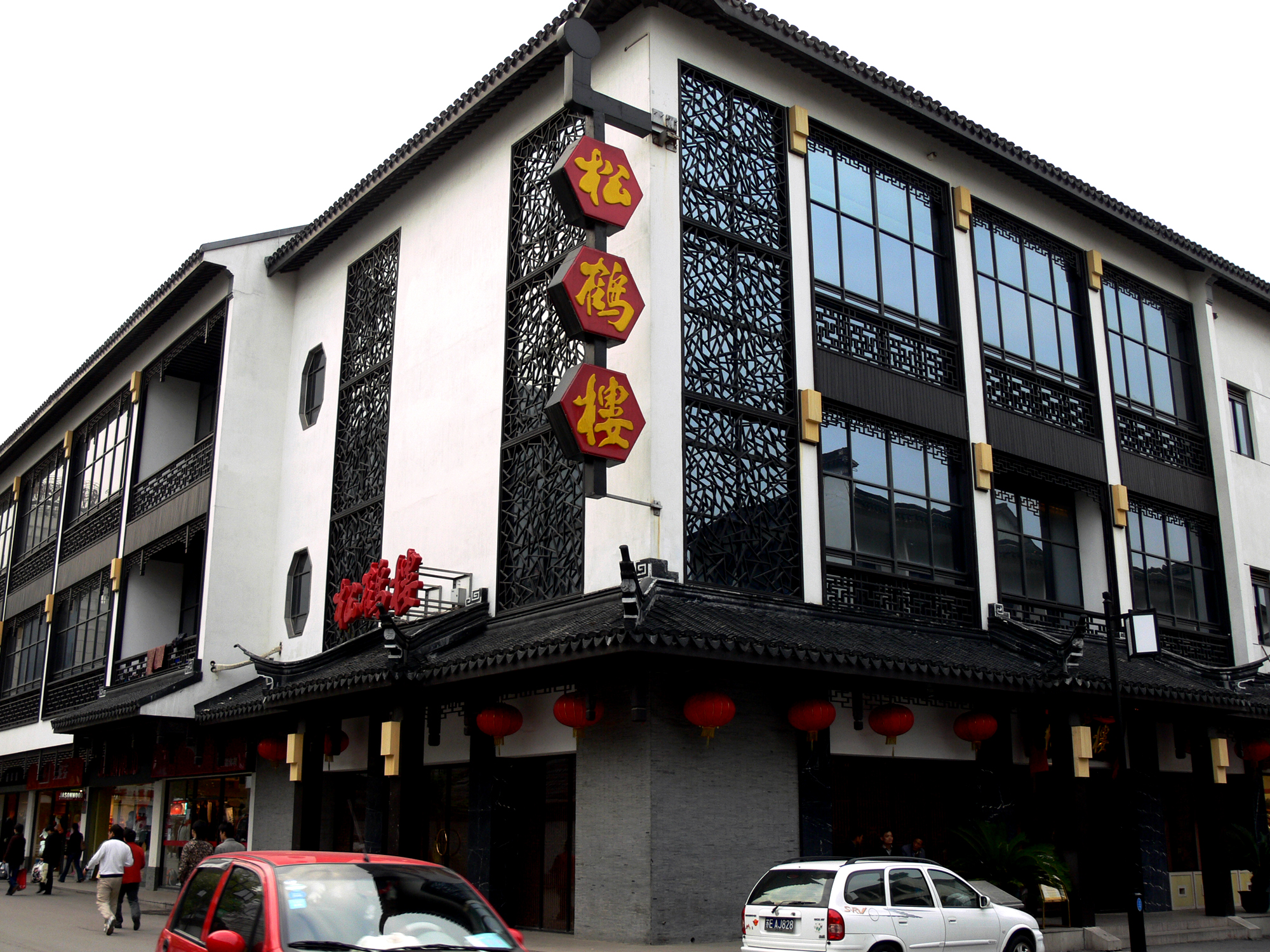
Songhelou restaurant

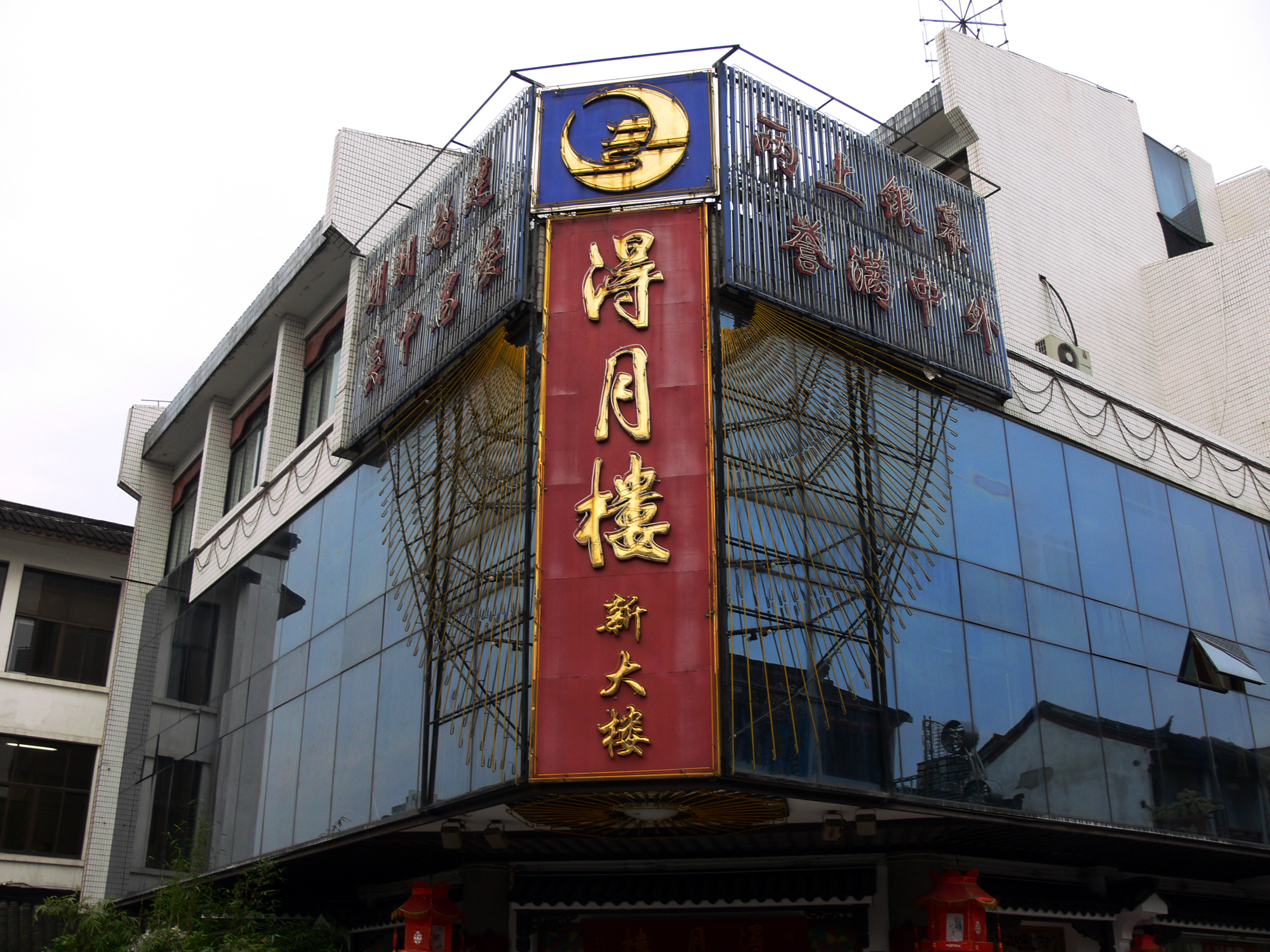
Deyuelou restaurant
