= Wenhuabolanzhongxin station =

Suzhou Metro station

Wenhuabolanzhongxin 文化博览中心
- Platform in April 2026

Chinese name
- Simplified Chinese: 文化博览中心站
- Traditional Chinese: 文化博覽中心站
Transcriptions
Standard Mandarin
- Hanyu Pinyin: Wénhuà Bólǎnzhōngxīn Zhàn

General information
- Location: Jinju Road (金琚路) & Suzhou Avenue East × Guanfeng Street (观枫街) & Shuige Road (水阁路); Suzhou Industrial Park, Suzhou, Jiangsu; China
- Coordinates: 31°19′30″N 120°41′58″E
- Operator: Suzhou Rail Transit Group Co., Ltd.
- Line: Line 1
- Platforms: 2 (1 island platform)
- Tracks: 2

Construction
- Structure type: Underground
- Accessible: Yes

History
- Opened: 28 April 2012
- Former names: Culture & Expo Centre

Services
Preceding station	Suzhou Metro	Following station
Dongfangzhimen towards Mudu	Line 1	Shidaiguangchang towards Zhongnanjie
Location

Wenhuabolanzhongxin (Chinese: 文化博览中心) is a station of Line 1 of the Suzhou Metro. The station is located in Suzhou Industrial Park of Suzhou. It has been in use since April 28, 2012, when Line 1 first opened.

The English name of this station was Culture & Expo Centre. In November 2019, this station and many others were partially renamed to Wenhuabolanzhongxin. On line maps and official maps, this station's English name is listed as "Wenhuabolanzhongxin". However, ticket machines still display the name "Culture and Expo Centre".

Sign before renamed

== Station layout ==
Concourse

Wenhuabolanzhongxin has two levels: a concourse, and an island platform with two tracks for line 1.

== Entrances/exits ==
Entrance 2

- 1: Jinju Road, Jinji Lake, Suzhou Culture and Arts Centre, Moon Harbor
- 2: Suzhou Avenue East, Moon Harbor, Suzhou Culture and Expo Plaza
- 3: Guanfeng Street, Xiandai Avenue, Suzhou International Expo Center
- 4: Guanfeng Street, Xiandai Avenue, Hongfenglin Park (红枫林公园)
