= Xinghu Jie station =

Suzhou Metro station

Coordinates: 31°19′30″N 120°42′58″E

Xinghu Jie 星湖街
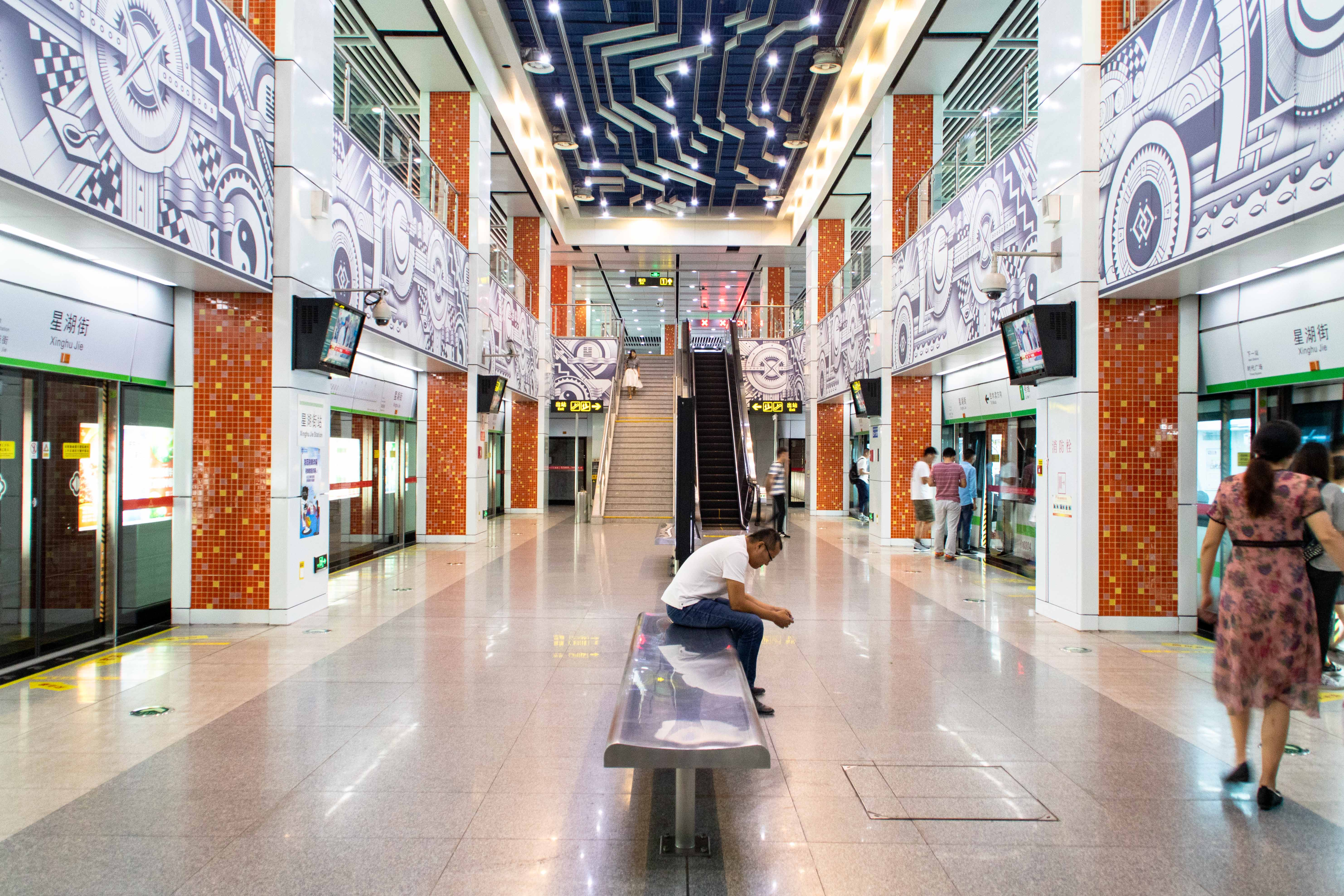
- Platform in September 2018

General information
- Other names: Xinghu Street
- Location: Suzhou Industrial Park, Suzhou, Jiangsu; China
- Operated by: Suzhou Rail Transit Co., Ltd
- Line(s): Line 1
- Platforms: 2 (1 island platform)

Construction
- Structure type: Underground

History
- Opened: April 28, 2012

Services
Preceding station	Suzhou Metro	Following station
Times Square towards Mudu	Line 1	Nanshi Jie towards Zhongnan Jie

Xinghu Jie Station (Chinese: 星湖街站) is a station of Line 1 of the Suzhou Metro. The station is located in Suzhou Industrial Park of Suzhou. It has been in use since April 28, 2012, when Line 1 first opened.

== Gallery ==
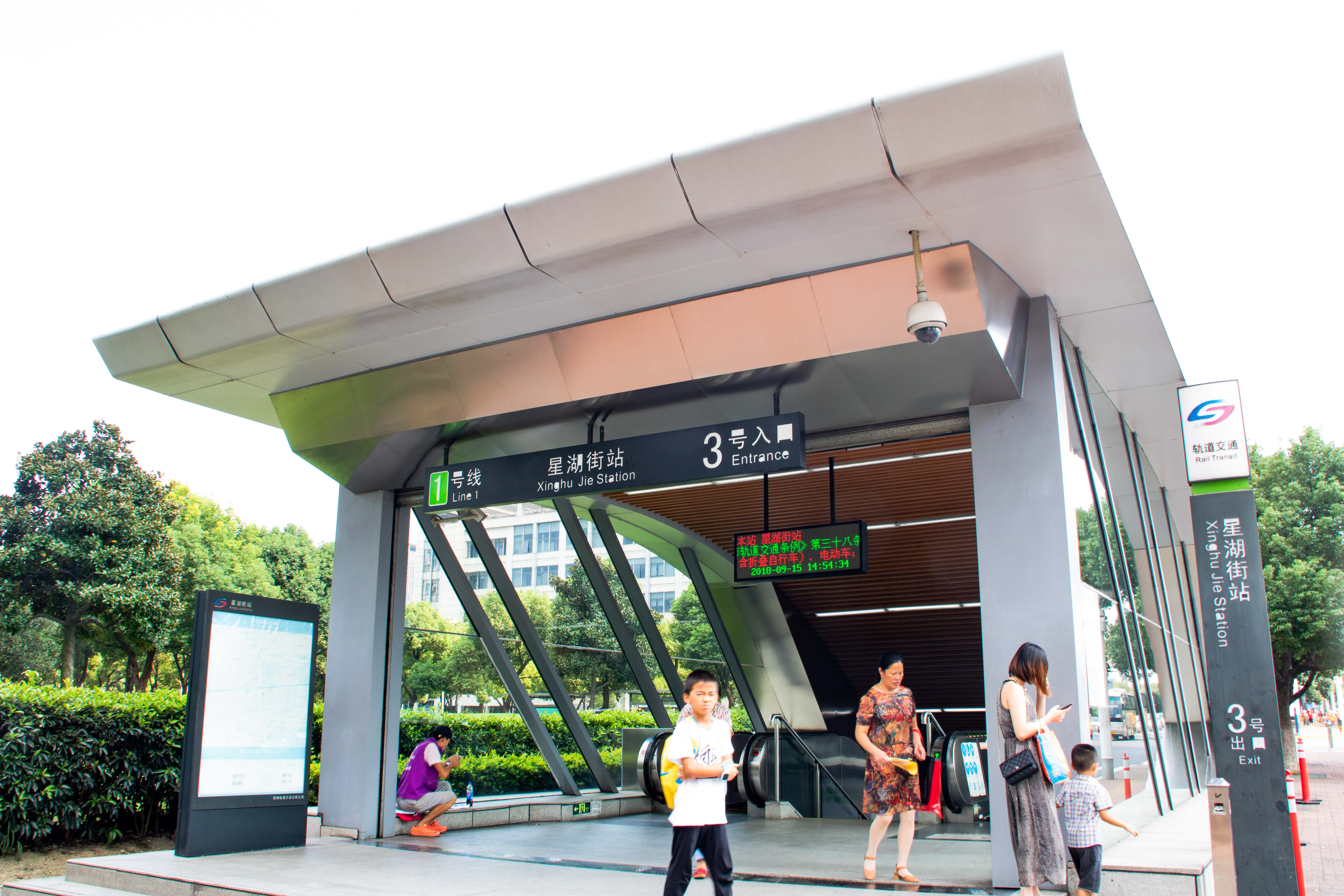
Entrance 3

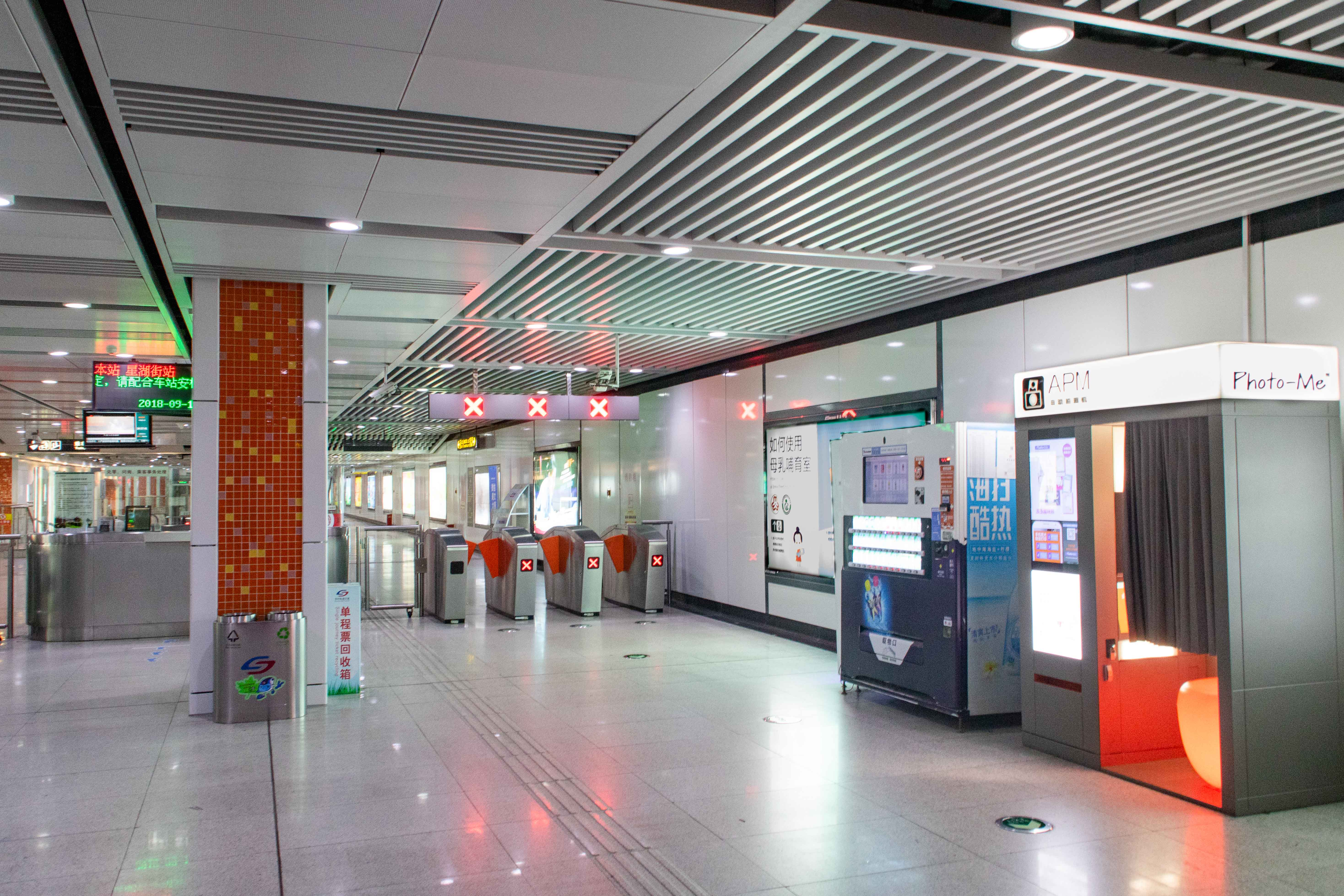
Concourse

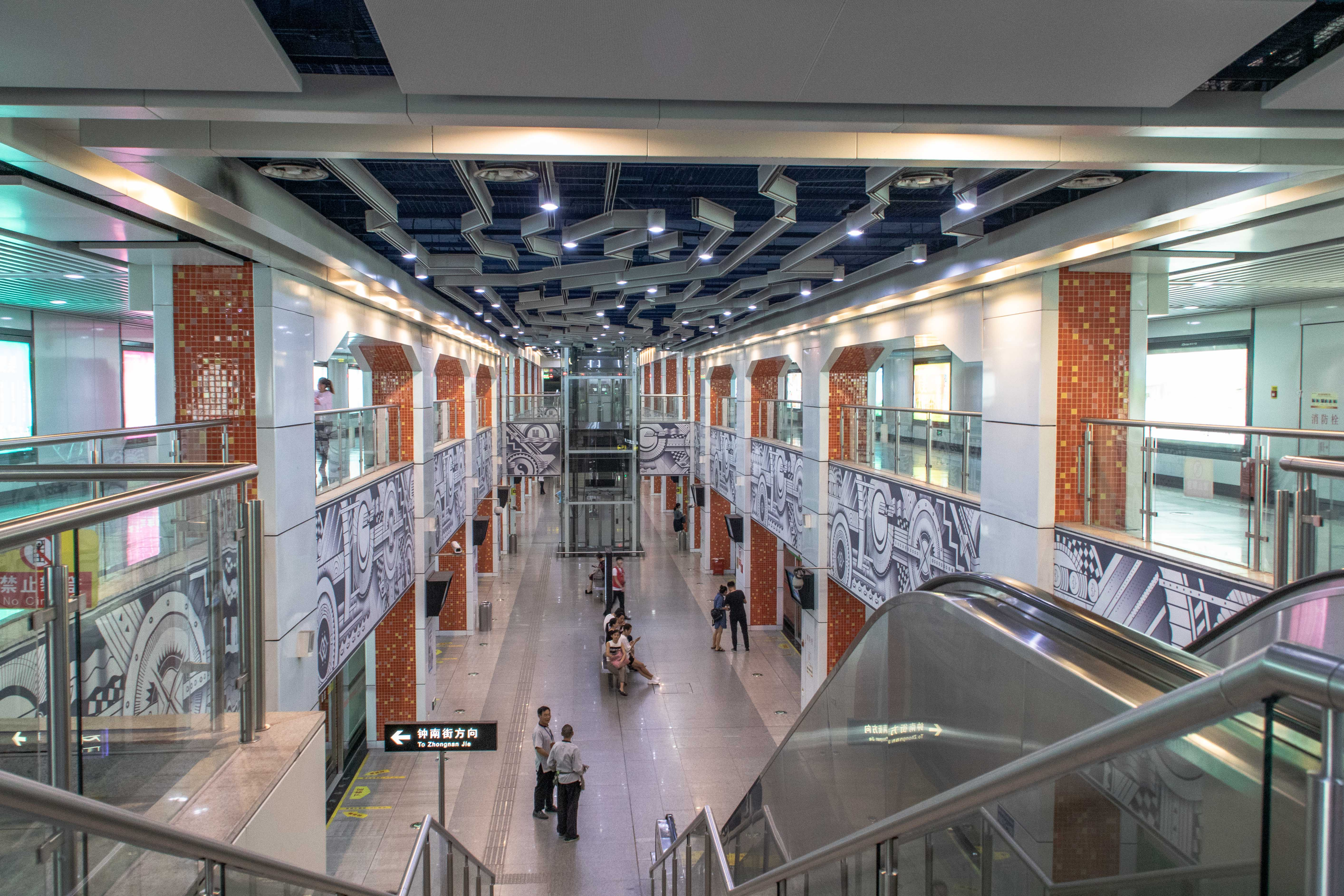
Platform
