= Dongfangzhimen station =

Suzhou Metro station

Coordinates: 31°19′07″N 120°40′27″E

Dongfangzhimen 东方之门
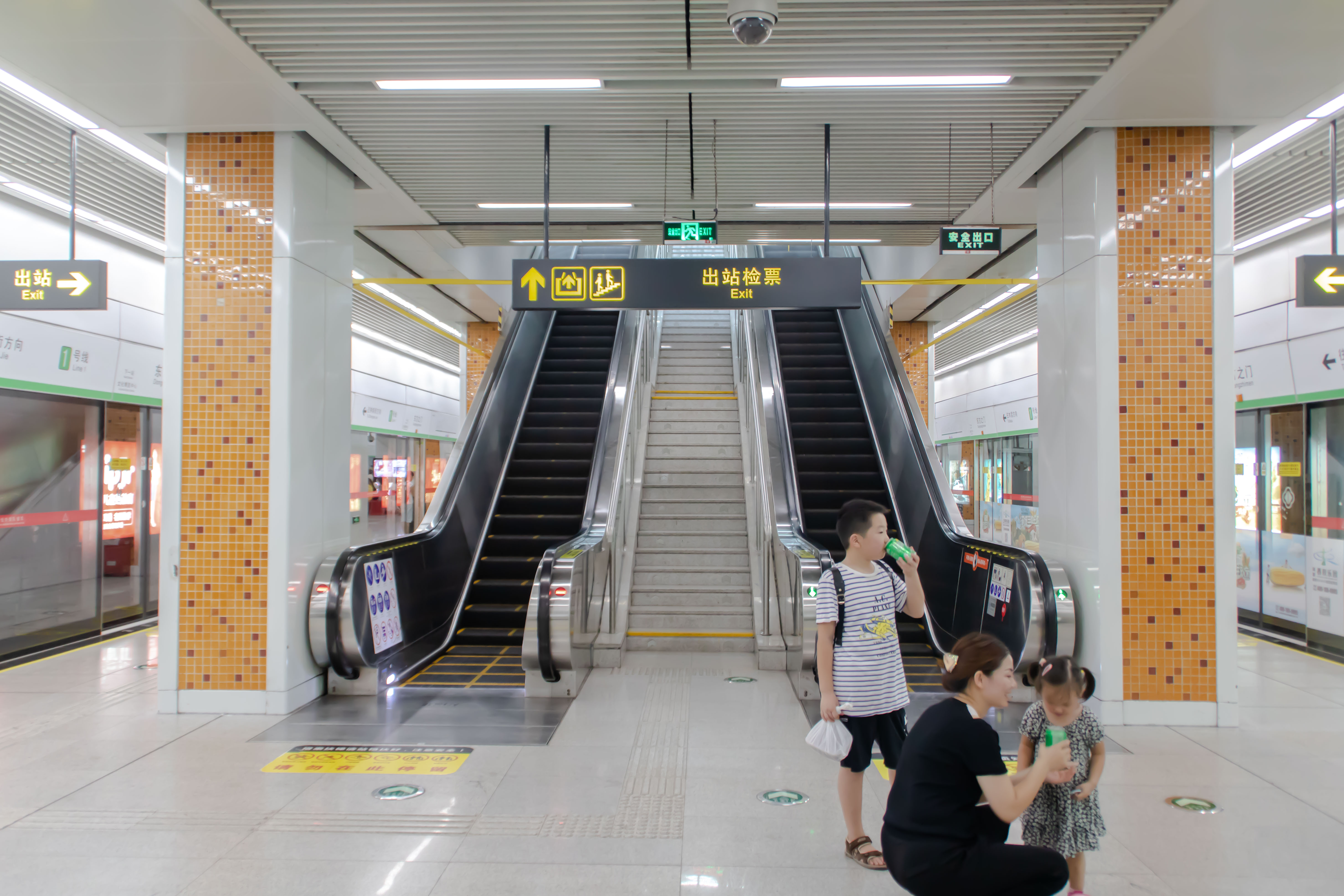
- Line 1 platform in September 2018

General information
- Location: Suzhou Industrial Park, Suzhou, Jiangsu; China
- Operated by: Suzhou Rail Transit Co., Ltd
- Line(s): Line 1 Line 3
- Platforms: 4 (2 island platforms)

Construction
- Structure type: Underground

History
- Opened: April 28, 2012

Services
Preceding station	Suzhou Metro	Following station
Xinghai Square towards Mudu	Line 1	Culture & Expo Center towards Zhongnan Jie
Ligongdi West towards Suzhou Xinqu Railway Station	Line 3	Yanyuqiao towards Weiting

Dongfangzhimen Station (Chinese: 东方之门站, literally Gate to the East Station) is a station of Line 1 and Line 3 of the Suzhou Metro. The station is located in Suzhou Industrial Park of Suzhou, near the Gate to the East skyscraper, which is positioned at the intersection of the historical East-West-axis of Suzhou Old Town with the West bank of Jinji Lake. The station has been in use since April 28, 2012, when Line 1 first opened.

== Gallery ==
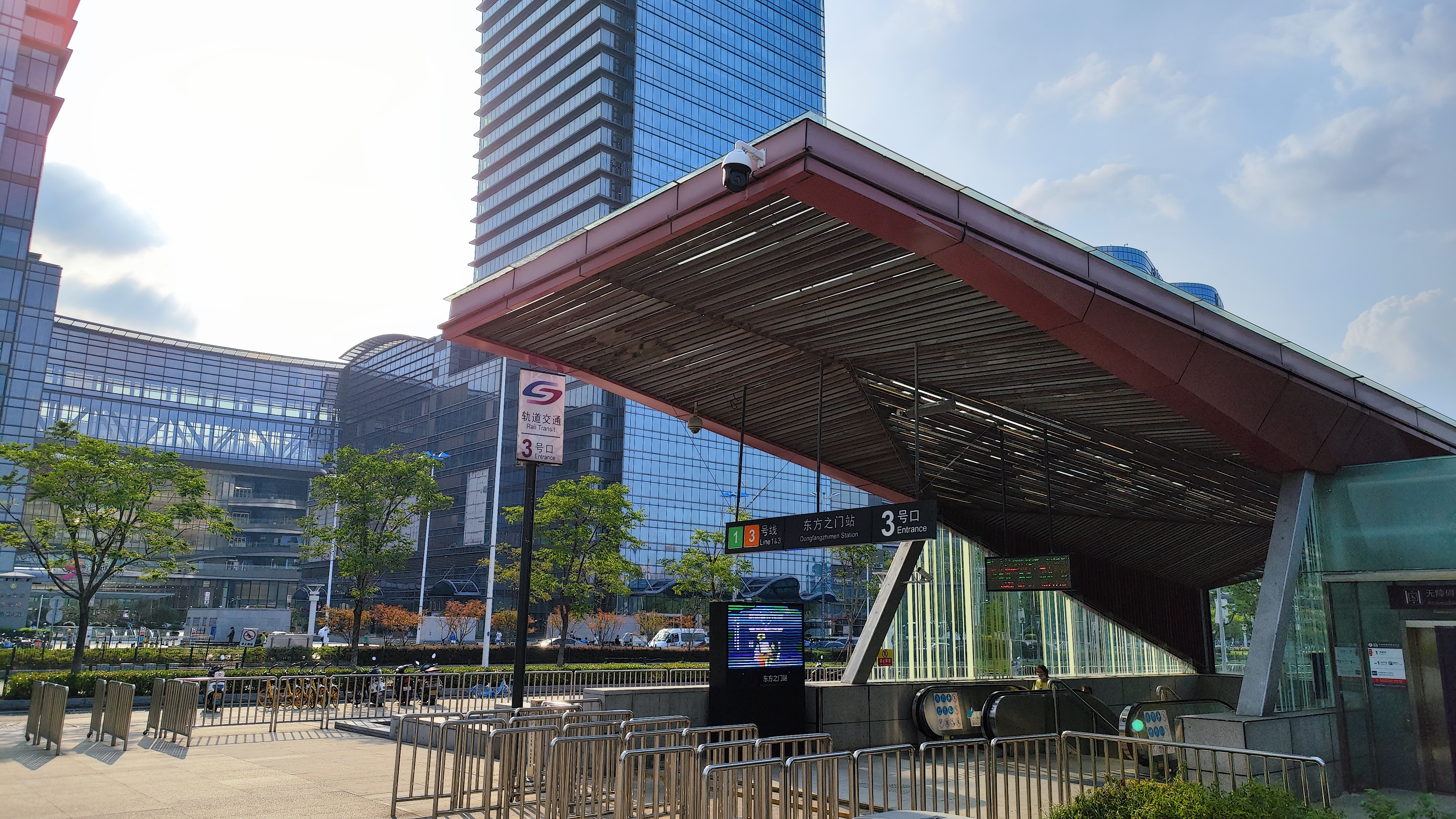
Entrance 3

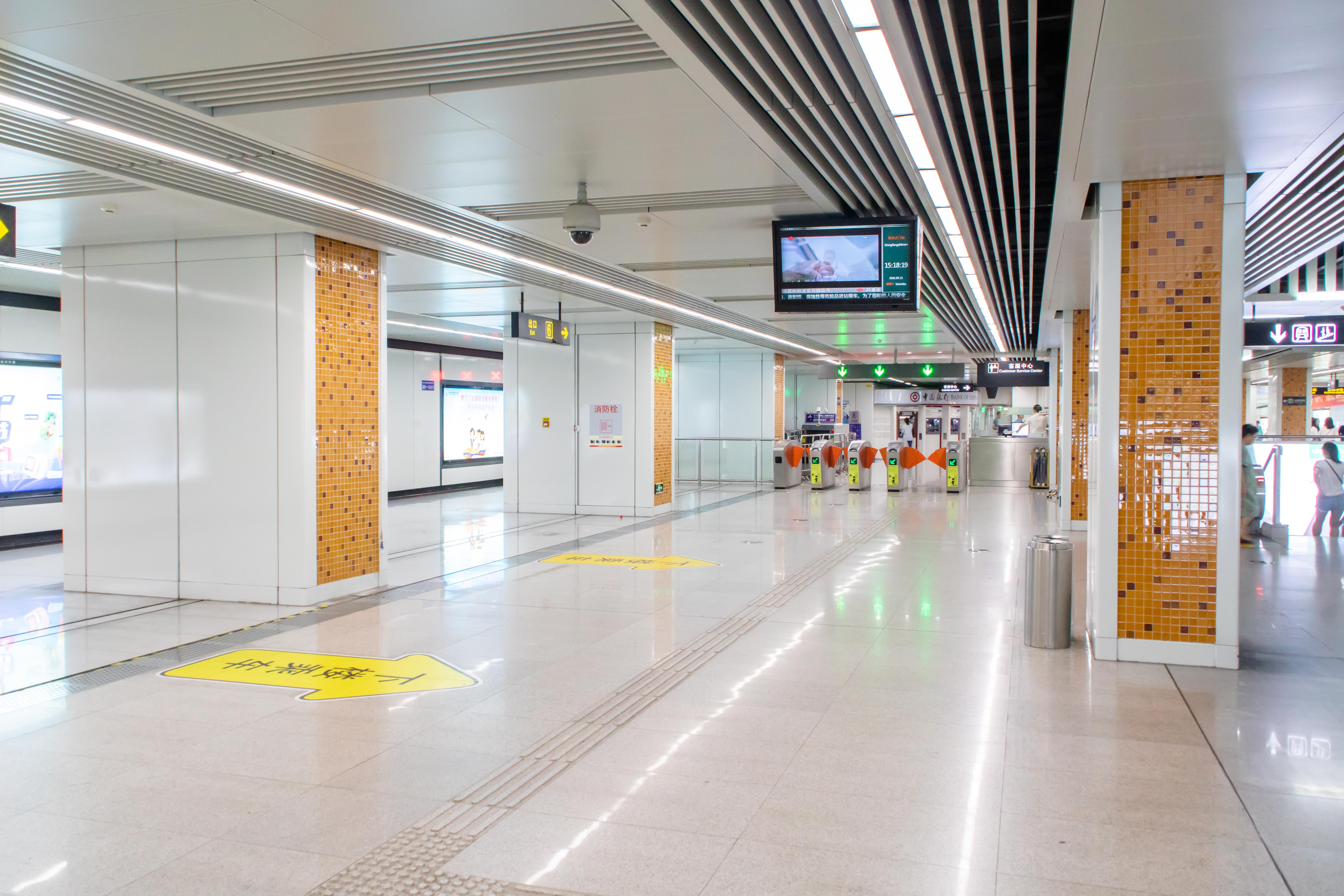
Concourse

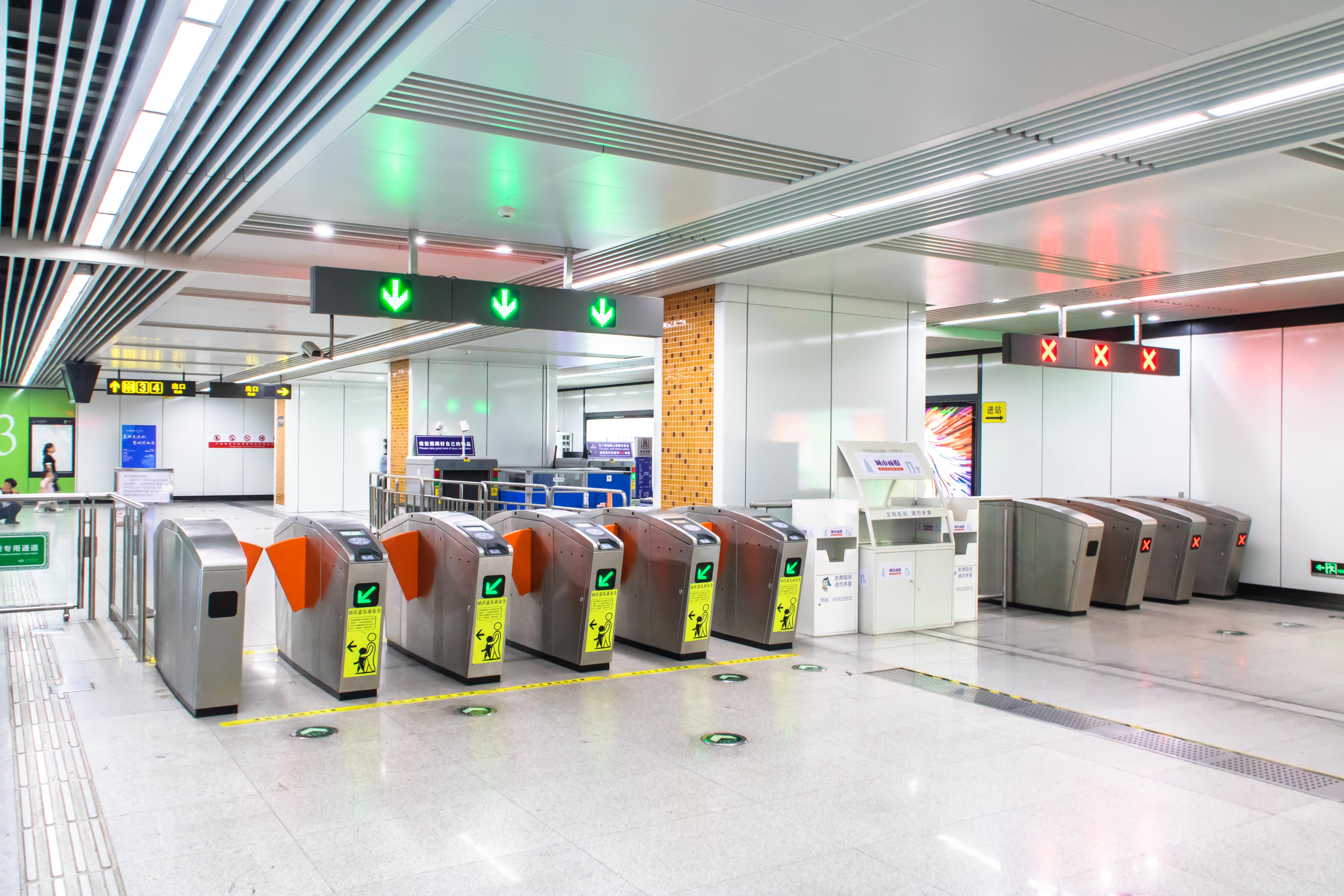
Ticket gates

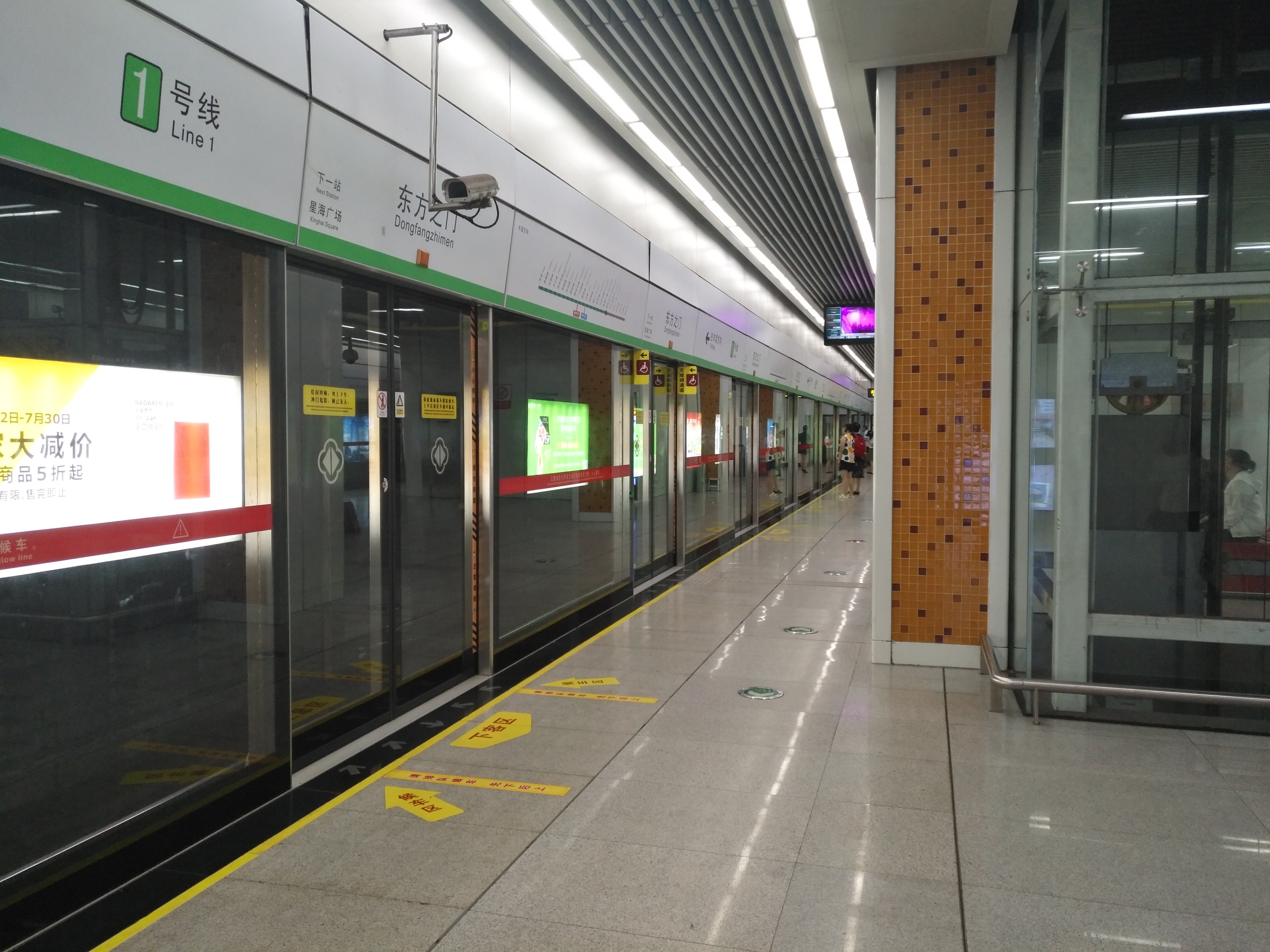
Line 1 platform

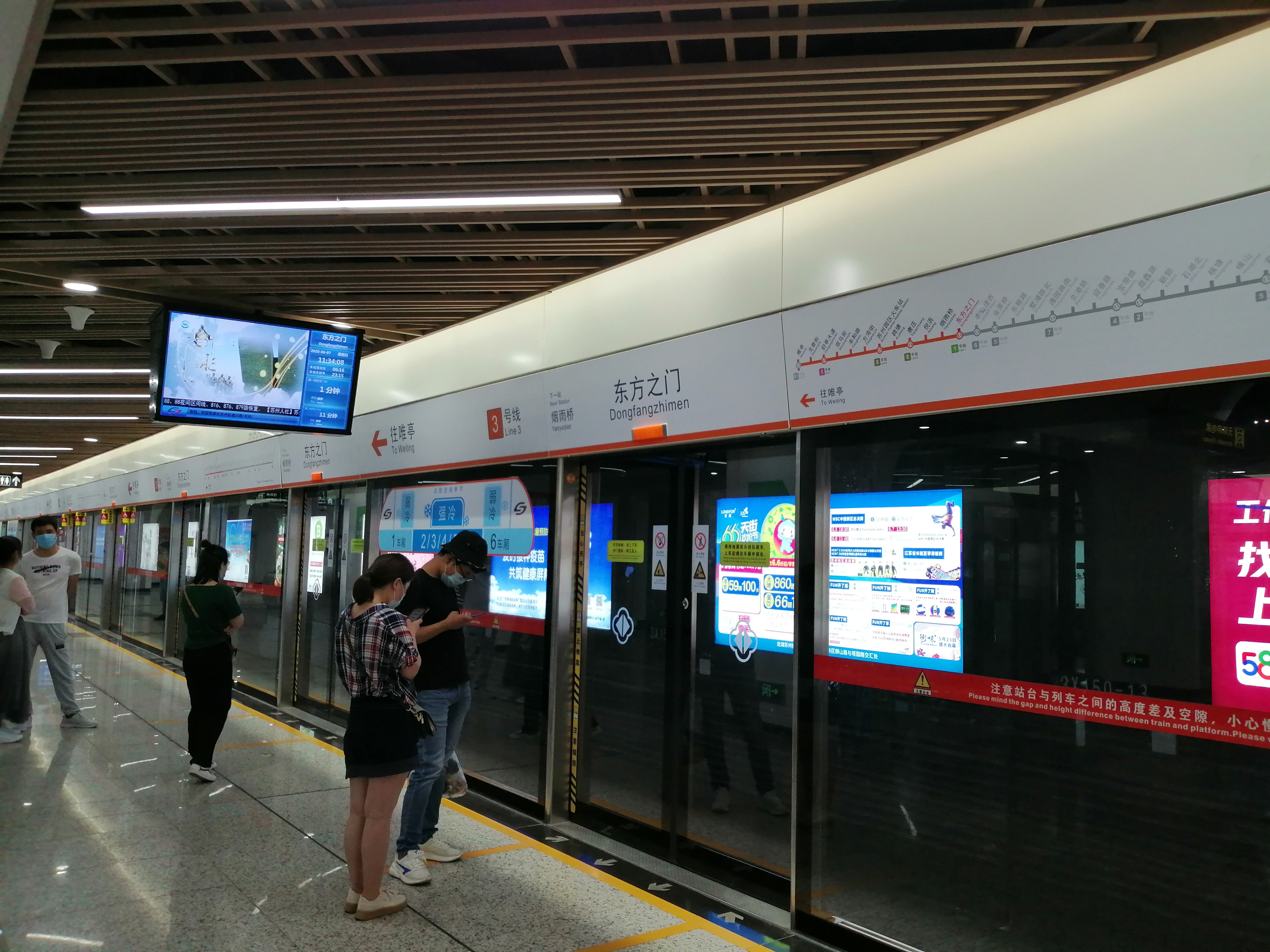
Line 3 platform
