= Zhongyanggongyuan station =

Metro station in Suzhou, China

Zhongyanggongyuan 中央公园
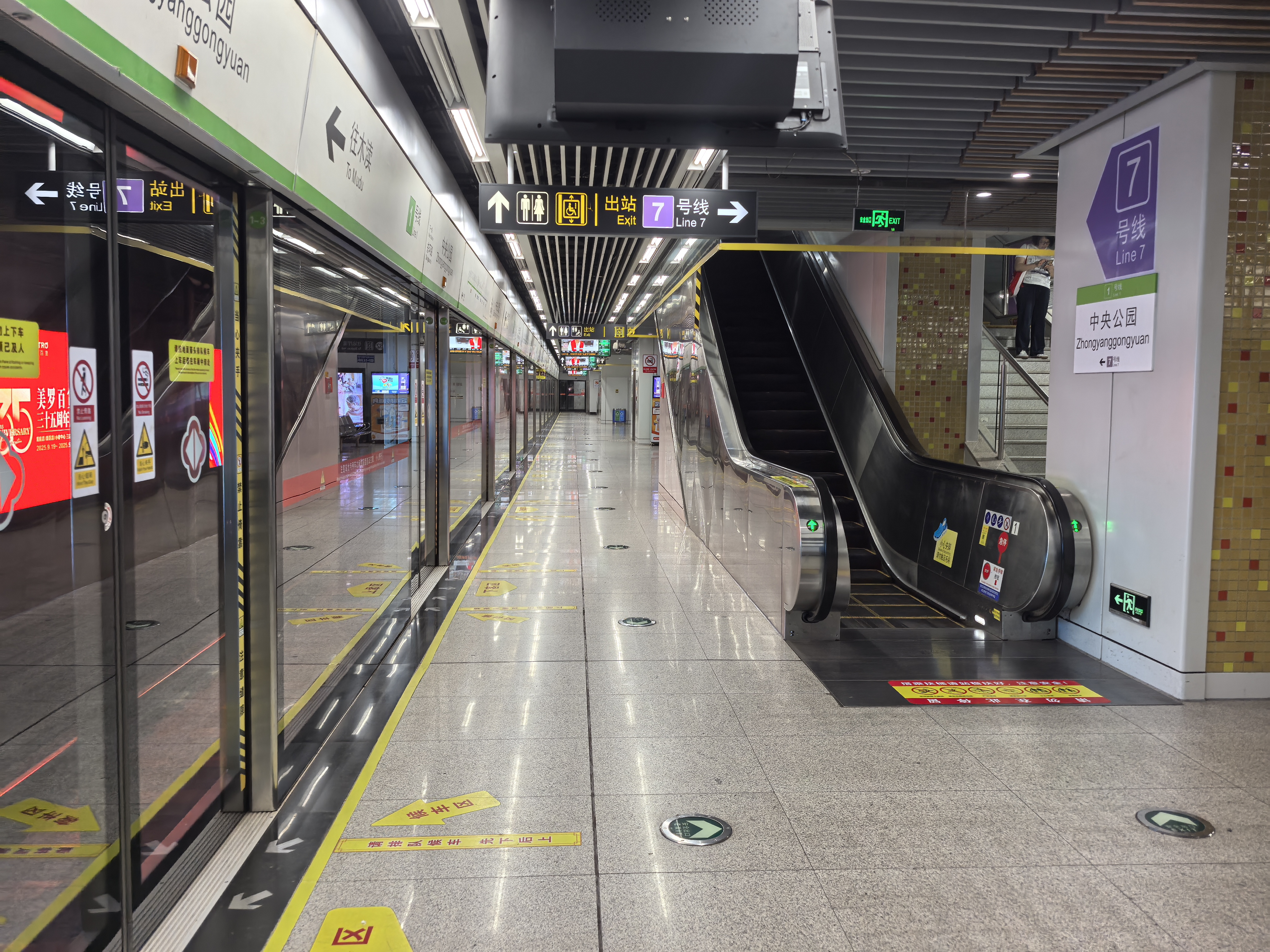
- Platform of line 1 in September 2025

Chinese name
- Simplified Chinese: 中央公园站
- Traditional Chinese: 中央公園站
Transcriptions
Standard Mandarin
- Hanyu Pinyin: Zhōngyāng Gōngyuán Zhàn

General information
- Location: Suzhou Avenue West × Xingming Street; Suzhou Industrial Park, Suzhou, Jiangsu; China
- Coordinates: 31°18′57″N 120°39′20″E
- Operator: Suzhou Rail Transit Group Co., Ltd.
- Lines: Line 1 Line 7
- Platforms: 4 (2 island platforms)
- Tracks: 4

Construction
- Structure type: Underground
- Platform levels: 2
- Accessible: Yes

History
- Opened: 28 April 2012
- Former names: Central Park

Services
Preceding station	Suzhou Metro	Following station
Donghuan Lu towards Mudu	Line 1	Xinghai Square towards Zhongnanjie
Jicuiqiao towards Changlou	Line 7	Reyunqiao towards Muli
Location

Zhongyanggongyuan (Chinese: 中央公园), formerly translated as Central Park, is a station on Line 1 and Line 7 of the Suzhou Metro. The station is located in Suzhou Industrial Park of Suzhou. It has been in use since April 28, 2012, when Line 1 first opened.
