= Nanshi Jie station =

Suzhou Metro station

Coordinates: 31°19′35″N 120°43′44″E

Nanshi Jie 南施街
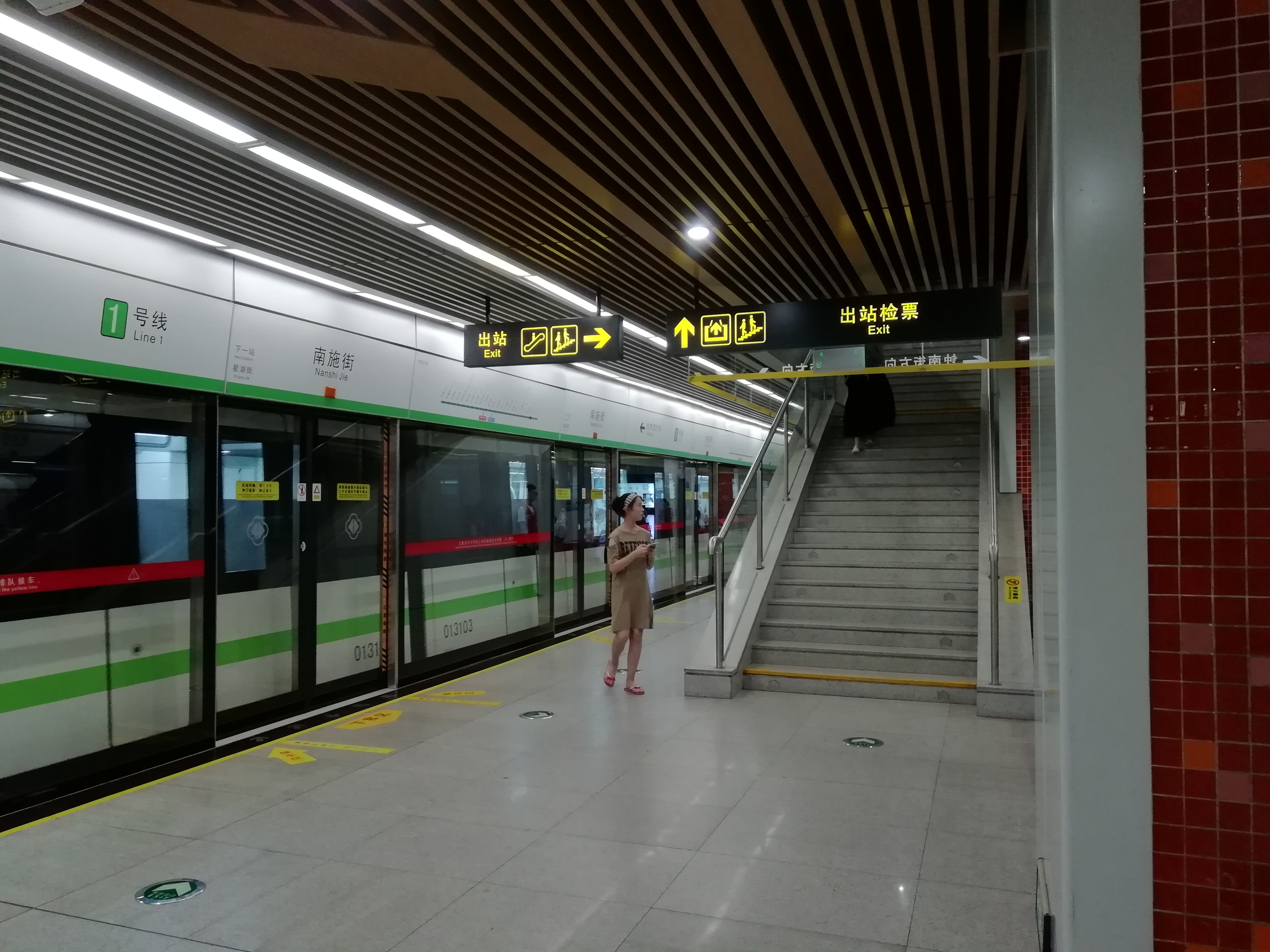
- Platform in August 2018

General information
- Other names: Nanshi Street
- Location: Suzhou Industrial Park, Suzhou, Jiangsu; China
- Operated by: Suzhou Rail Transit Co., Ltd
- Line(s): Line 1
- Platforms: 2 (1 island platform)

Construction
- Structure type: Underground

History
- Opened: April 28, 2012

Services
Preceding station	Suzhou Metro	Following station
Xinghu Jie towards Mudu	Line 1	Xingtang Jie towards Zhongnan Jie

Nanshi Jie Station (Chinese: 南施街站) is a station of Line 1 of the Suzhou Metro. The station is located in Suzhou Industrial Park in the East of Suzhou. It has been in use since April 28, 2012, when Line 1 first opened.
