= Donghuan Lu station =

Suzhou Metro station

Coordinates: 31°18′52″N 120°38′47″E

Donghuan Lu 东环路
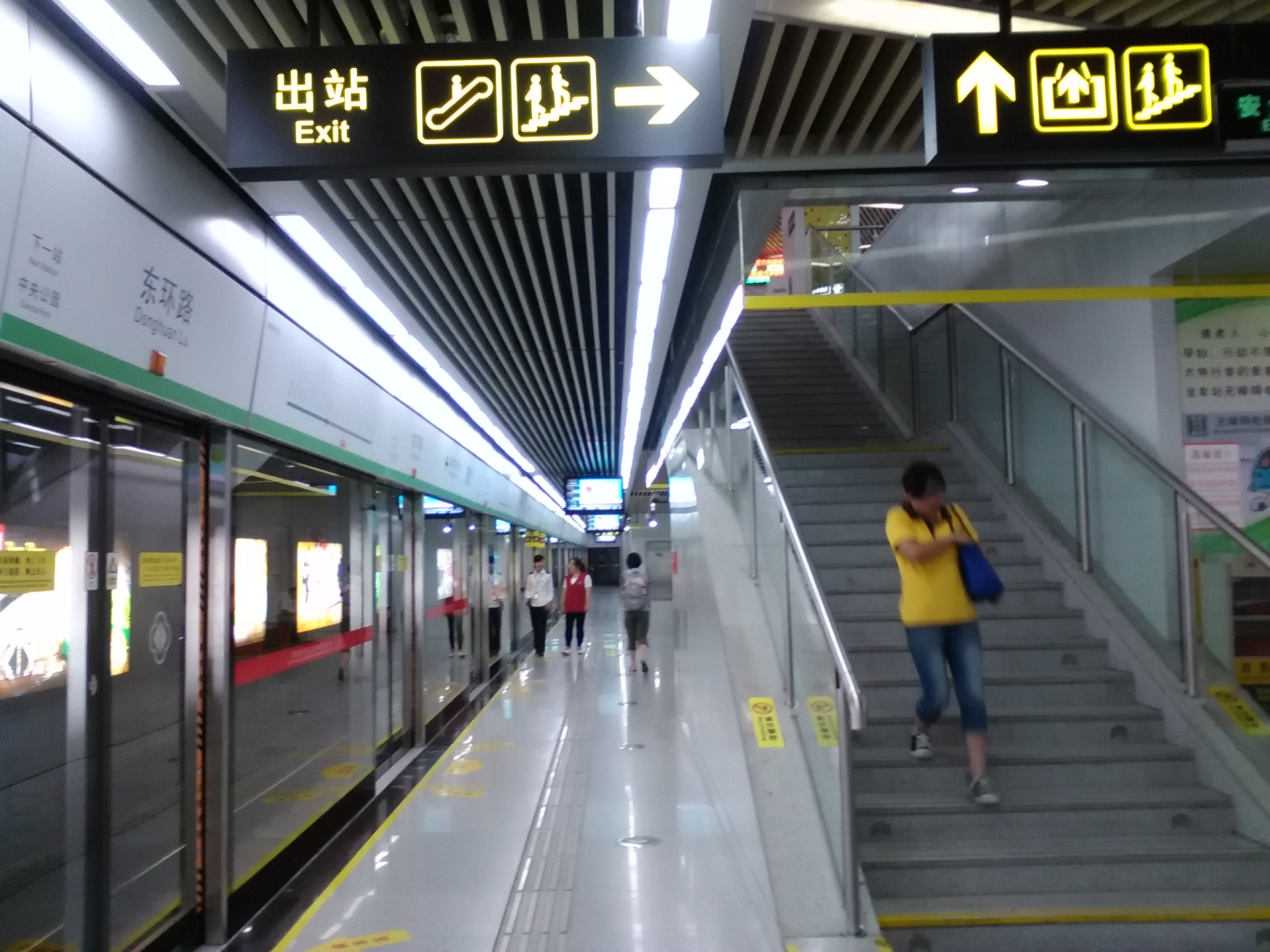
- Platform in July 2015

General information
- Other names: Donghuan Road
- Location: Gusu District, Suzhou, Jiangsu; China
- Operated by: Suzhou Rail Transit Co., Ltd
- Line(s): Line 1
- Platforms: 2 (1 island platform)

Construction
- Structure type: Underground

History
- Opened: April 28, 2012

Services
Preceding station	Suzhou Metro	Following station
Xiangmen towards Mudu	Line 1	Central Park towards Zhongnan Jie

Donghuan Lu Station (Chinese: 东环路站) is a station of Line 1 of the Suzhou Metro. The station is located in Gusu District of Suzhou. It has been in use since April 28, 2012, when Line 1 first opened.
