= Binhe Lu station =

Suzhou Metro station

Coordinates: 31°18′10″N 120°33′43″E

Binhe Lu 滨河路
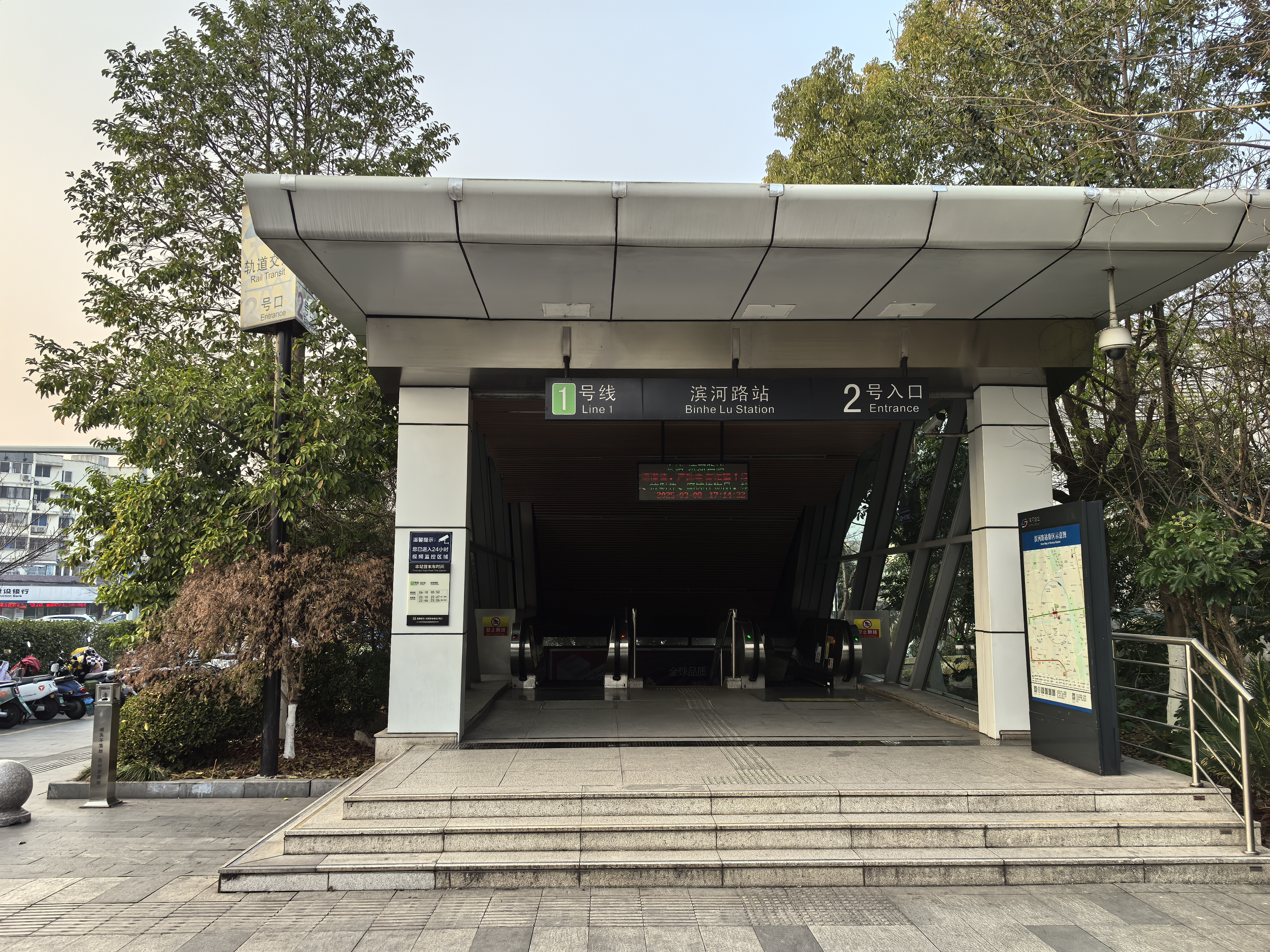

General information
- Other names: Binhe Road
- Location: Suzhou New District, Suzhou, Jiangsu; China
- Operated by: Suzhou Rail Transit Co., Ltd
- Line: Line 1
- Platforms: 2 (1 island platform)

Construction
- Structure type: Underground

History
- Opened: April 28, 2012

Services
Preceding station	Suzhou Metro	Following station
Tayuan Lu towards Mudu	Line 1	Xihuan Lu towards Zhongnanjie
Location

Binhe Lu (Chinese: 滨河路) is a station of Line 1 of the Suzhou Metro. The station is located in Suzhou New District of Suzhou. It opened with the rest of line 1 on April 28, 2012.

== Station ==
=== Accessible Information ===
- Binhe Lu Station is a fully accessible station, equipped with wheelchair accessible elevators, blind paths with bumps, and wheelchair ramps. These facilities can help seniors, youths, pregnant women and people with disabilities to travel on the Suzhou Metro system.

=== Station configurations ===
L1 (First Floor/Street Level): Entrances/Exits (stairs and escalators); and elevators with wheelchair accessible ramps.

B1 (Mezzanine/Station Hall Level): Station Control Room; Customer Service; Automatic Ticket Vending Machines; Automatic Fee Collection Systems with turnstiles; stairs and escalators; and elevators with wheelchair accessible ramps.

B2 (Platform Level): Platform; toilet; stairs and escalators; elevators with wheelchair accessible ramps.

=== Station layout ===
L1	Street Level	Entrances/Exits
B1	Mezzanine	Station Control, Customer Service, Fare-gates, Ticketing Machines
B2; Platform level	To Zhongnan Jie	← Line 1 towards Zhongnan Jie Next Station: Xinhuan Lu
B2; Platform level	Island platform, doors will open on the left
B2; Platform level	To Mudu	→Line 1 towards Mudu Next Station: Tayuan Lu

== First & Last Trains ==
Directions	First Train	Last Train
Daily
Line 1
Towards Zhongnan Jie Station	06:22	22:12
Towards Mudu Station	06:44	22:09

== Exits Information ==
- Exit 1: South-west corner of Dengwei Lu and Binhe Lu
- Exit 2: South-east corner of Dengwei Lu and Binhe Lu
- Exit 3: North-east corner of Dengwei Lu and Binhe Lu
- Exit 4: North-west corner of Dengwei Lu and Binhe Lu

== Local attractions ==
- He Shan Garden
- Bin He Garden
- Jin Ning Ge Garden
- Run Jie Plaza
- Central Business District of SND (2 blocks away)

== Bus Connections ==
- Bus Stop: He Shan Hua Yuan – Connection Bus Routes: 30, 31, 33, 308, 313, 321, 328, 355, 415, 622, Tour 3
- Bus Stop: He Shan Hua Yuan Nan – Connection Bus Routes: 325
