= Tayuan Lu station =

Suzhou Metro station

Coordinates: 31°18′07″N 120°33′09″E

Tayuan Lu 塔园路
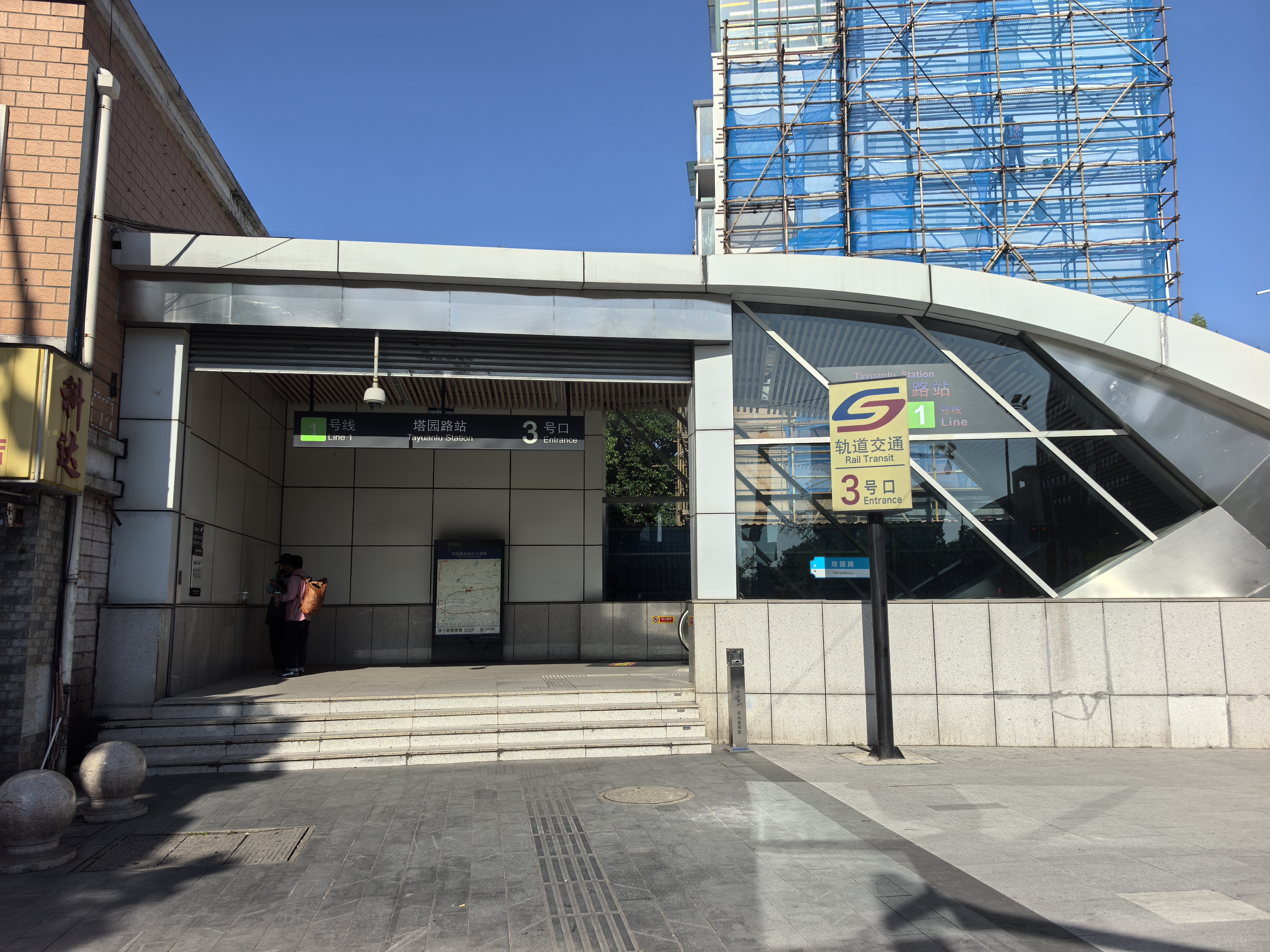

General information
- Other names: Tayuan Road
- Location: Suzhou New District, Suzhou, Jiangsu; China
- Operated by: Suzhou Rail Transit Co., Ltd
- Line: Line 1
- Platforms: 2 (1 island platform)

Construction
- Structure type: Underground

History
- Opened: April 28, 2012

Services
Preceding station	Suzhou Metro	Following station
Shizishan towards Mudu	Line 1	Binhe Lu towards Zhongnanjie
Location

Tayuan Lu Station (Chinese: 塔园路站) is a station of Line 1 of the Suzhou Metro. The station is located in Suzhou New District of Suzhou. It has been in use since April 28, 2012, when Line 1 first opened.

== Station ==
=== Accessible Information ===
- Tayuan Lu Station is a fully accessible station, this station equipped with wheelchair accessible elevators, blind paths with bumps, and wheelchair ramps. These facilities can help people with disabilities, seniors, youths, and pregnancies travel through the Suzhou Metro system.

=== Station configurations ===
L1 (First Floor/Street Level): Entrances/Exits (stairs and escalators); and elevators with wheelchair accessible ramps.

B1 (Mezzanine/Station Hall Level): Station Control Room; Customer Service; Automatic Ticket Vending Machines; Automatic Fee Collection Systems with turnstiles; stairs and escalators; and elevators with wheelchair accessible ramps.

B2 (Platform Level): Platform; toilet; stairs and escalators; elevators with wheelchair accessible ramps.

=== Station layout ===
L1	Street Level	Entrances/Exits
B1	Mezzanine	Station Control, Customer Service, Fare-gates, Ticketing Machines
B2; Platform level	To Zhongnan Jie	← Line 1 towards Zhongnan Jie Next Station: Binhe Lu
B2; Platform level	Island platform, doors will open on the left
B2; Platform level	To Mudu	→Line 1 towards Mudu Next Station: Shizishan

== Exits ==
- Exit 1: South-West corner of Dengwei Lu and Tayuan Lu
- Exit 2: South-East corner of Dengwei Lu and Tayuan Lu
- Exit 3: North -East corner of Dengwei Lu and Tayuan Lu
- Exit 4: North-West corner of Dengwei Lu and Tayuan Lu

== First & last trains ==
Directions	First Train	Last Train
Daily
Line 1
Towards Zhongnan Jie Station	06:20	22:20
Towards Mudu Station	06:46	22:11

== Local attractions ==
- TaoYuan Resort Hotel
- GeLin Garden
- BinHe Garden
- MeiZhiYuan Garden
- Eton International School
- Technology University of Suzhou

== Bus connections ==
- Bus Stop: ZhangCheng Qiao - Connection Bus Routes: 325
- Bus Stop: TaoYuan DuJiaCun - Connection Bus Routes: 40, 406, 313
- Bus Stop: BinHe HuaYuan - Connection Bus Routes: 40, 406, 324, 353, 443
