= Xiangmen station =

Suzhou Metro station

Coordinates: 31°18′42″N 120°38′04″E

Xiangmen 相门
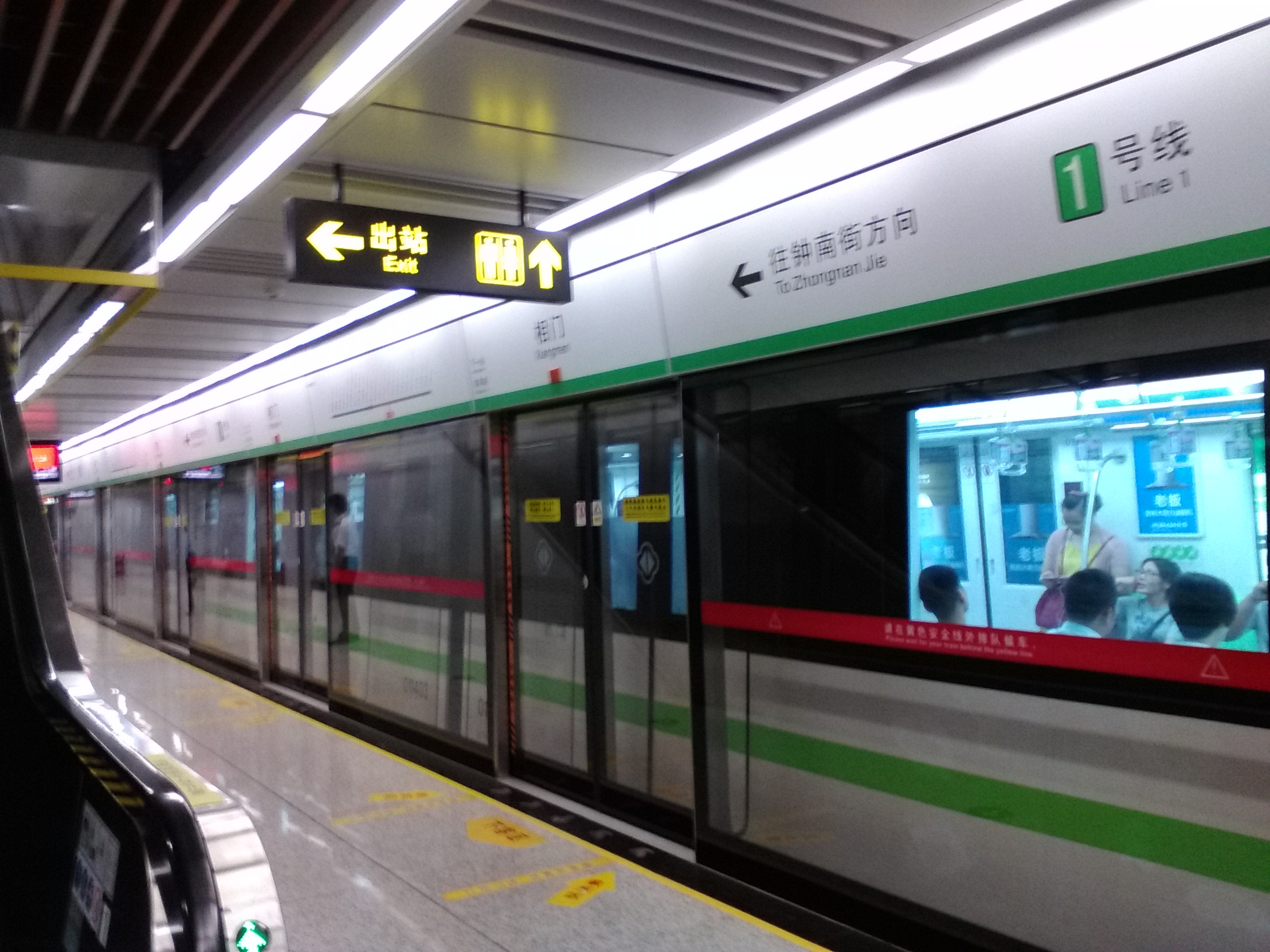
- Platform in September 2015

General information
- Location: Gusu District, Suzhou, Jiangsu; China
- Operated by: Suzhou Rail Transit Co., Ltd
- Line(s): Line 1
- Platforms: 2 (1 island platform)

Construction
- Structure type: Underground

History
- Opened: April 28, 2012

Services
Preceding station	Suzhou Metro	Following station
Lindun Lu towards Mudu	Line 1	Donghuan Lu towards Zhongnan Jie

Xiangmen Station (Chinese: 相门站) is a station of Line 1 of the Suzhou Metro. The station is located in Gusu District of Suzhou. It has been in use since April 28, 2012, when Line 1 first opened.
