= Lindun Lu station =

Suzhou Metro station

Coordinates: 31°18′36″N 120°37′37″E

Lindun Lu 临顿路
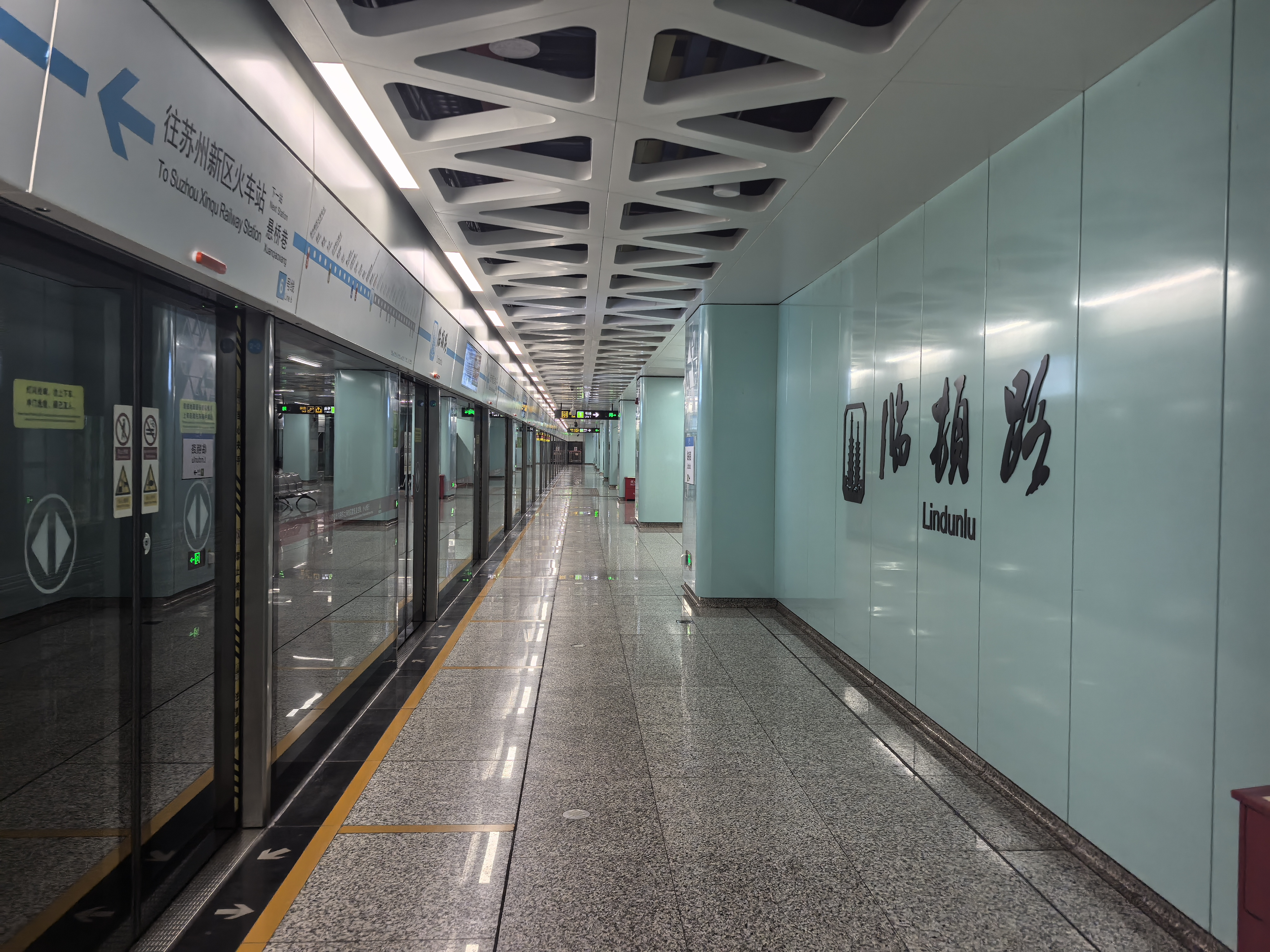
- Line 6 platform (September 2025)

General information
- Other names: Lindun Road
- Location: Gusu District, Suzhou, Jiangsu; China
- Operated by: Suzhou Rail Transit Co., Ltd
- Lines: Line 1 Line 6
- Platforms: 4 (2 island platform)

Construction
- Structure type: Underground

History
- Opened: April 28, 2012

Services
Preceding station	Suzhou Metro	Following station
Leqiao towards Mudu	Line 1	Xiangmen towards Zhongnanjie
Xuanqiaoxiang towards Suzhou Xinqu Railway Station	Line 6	Wangxingqiao Soochow University towards Sangtiandao
Location

Lindun Lu Station (Chinese: 临顿路站) is a station on Line 1 and Line 6 of the Suzhou Metro. The station is located in Gusu District of Suzhou. It has been in use since April 28, 2012, when Line 1 first opened.
