= Xinghai Square station =

Xinghai Square station (Chinese: 星海广场站) may refer to:

- Xinghai Square station (Dalian Metro), a station on Line 1 of Dalian Metro
- Xinghaiguangchang station, a station on Line 1 of Suzhou Metro, which was previously translated as "Xinghai Square"
