= Xingtangjie station =

Suzhou Metro station

Xingtangjie 星塘街
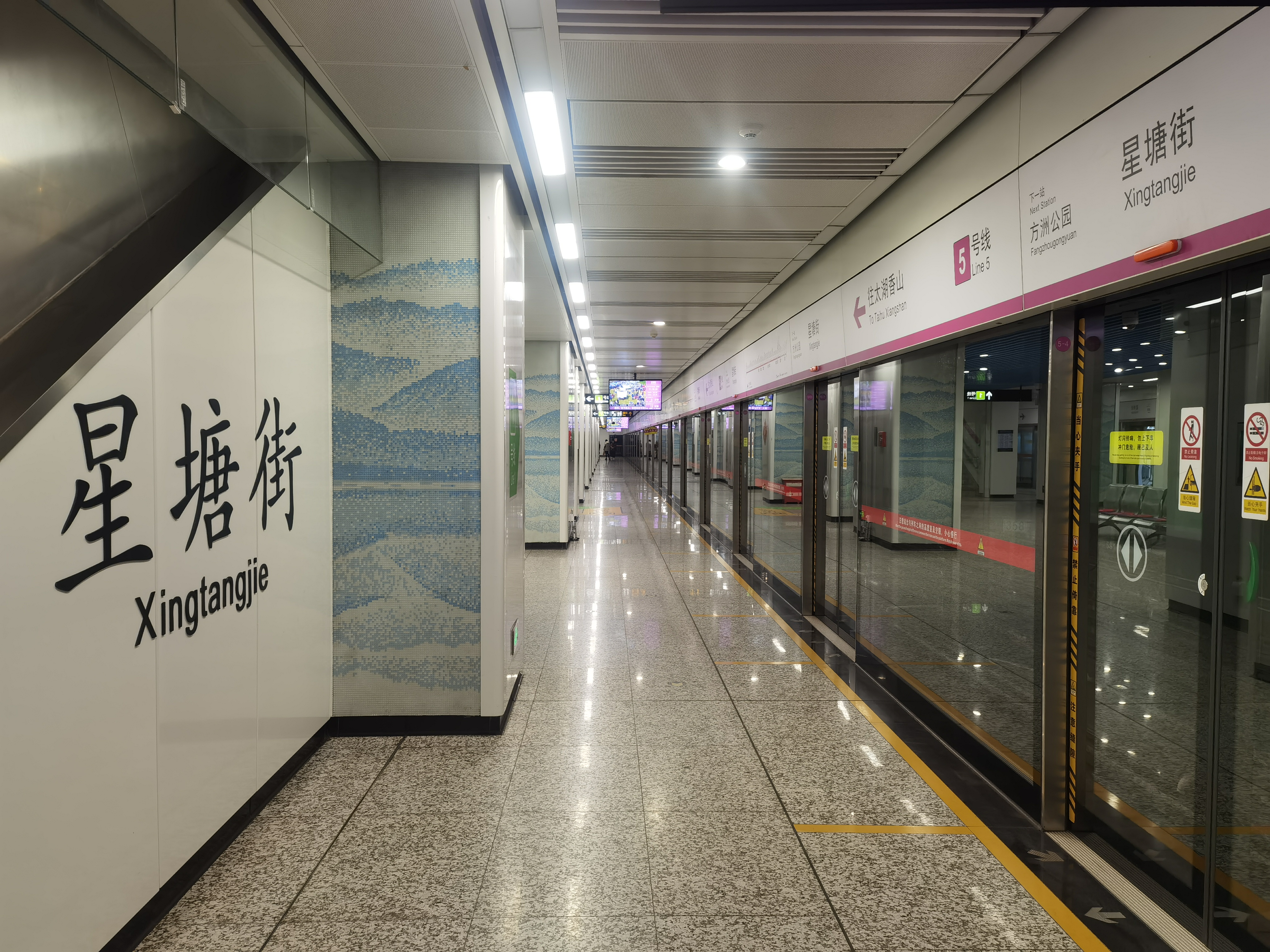
- Line 5 platform in February 2025

General information
- Location: Suzhou Avenue East (苏州大道东) × Xingtang Street (星塘街); Suzhou Industrial Park, Suzhou, Jiangsu; China
- Coordinates: 31°19′39″N 120°44′25″E
- Operated by: Suzhou Rail Transit Co., Ltd
- Lines: Line 1 Line 5
- Platforms: 4 (2 island platforms)

Construction
- Structure type: Underground

History
- Opened: April 28, 2012
- Previous names: Xingtang Jie

Services
Preceding station	Suzhou Metro	Following station
Nanshi Jie towards Mudu	Line 1	Zhongnanjie Terminus
Fangzhougongyuan towards Taihu Xiangshan	Line 5	Longdun towards Yangchenghu South
Location

Xingtangjie Station (Chinese: 星塘街站), formerly known as Xingtang Jie Station, is a station of Line 1 and Line 5 of the Suzhou Metro. The station is located in of Suzhou. It has been in use since April 28, 2012, when Line 1 first opened.
