= Times Square Station (disambiguation) =

Times Square Station may refer to:

- Times Square–42nd Street station, New York City
- Times Square station (Detroit), Michigan, U.S.
- Times Square station (Suzhou Metro), Jiangsu, China
