= Xinghaiguangchang station =

Metro station in Suzhou, China

Xinghaiguangchang 星海广场
- Platform

Chinese name
- Simplified Chinese: 星海广场站
- Traditional Chinese: 星海廣場站
Transcriptions
Standard Mandarin
- Hanyu Pinyin: Xīnghǎi Guǎngchǎng Zhàn

General information
- Location: Suzhou Avenue West × Xinghai Street; Suzhou Industrial Park, Suzhou, Jiangsu; China
- Coordinates: 31°19′03″N 120°39′59″E
- Operator: Suzhou Rail Transit Group Co., Ltd.
- Line: Line 1
- Platforms: 2 (1 island platform)
- Tracks: 2

Construction
- Structure type: Underground
- Accessible: Yes

History
- Opened: 28 April 2012
- Former names: Xinghai Square

Services
Preceding station	Suzhou Metro	Following station
Zhongyanggongyuan towards Mudu	Line 1	Dongfangzhimen towards Zhongnanjie
Location

Xinghaiguangchang (Chinese: 星海广场), formerly translated as Xinghai Square, is a station of Line 1 of the Suzhou Metro. The station is located in Suzhou Industrial Park of Suzhou. It has been in use since April 28, 2012, when Line 1 first opened.

== Station layout ==
Concourse

Xinghaiguangchang has two levels: a concourse, and an island platform with two tracks for line 1.

== Entrances/exits ==
Entrance 2

- 1: Xinghai Street
- 2: Xinghai Street
- 3: Xinghai Street
- 4: Xinghai Street
