= Shidaiguangchang station =

Metro station in Suzhou, China

Shidaiguangchang 时代广场
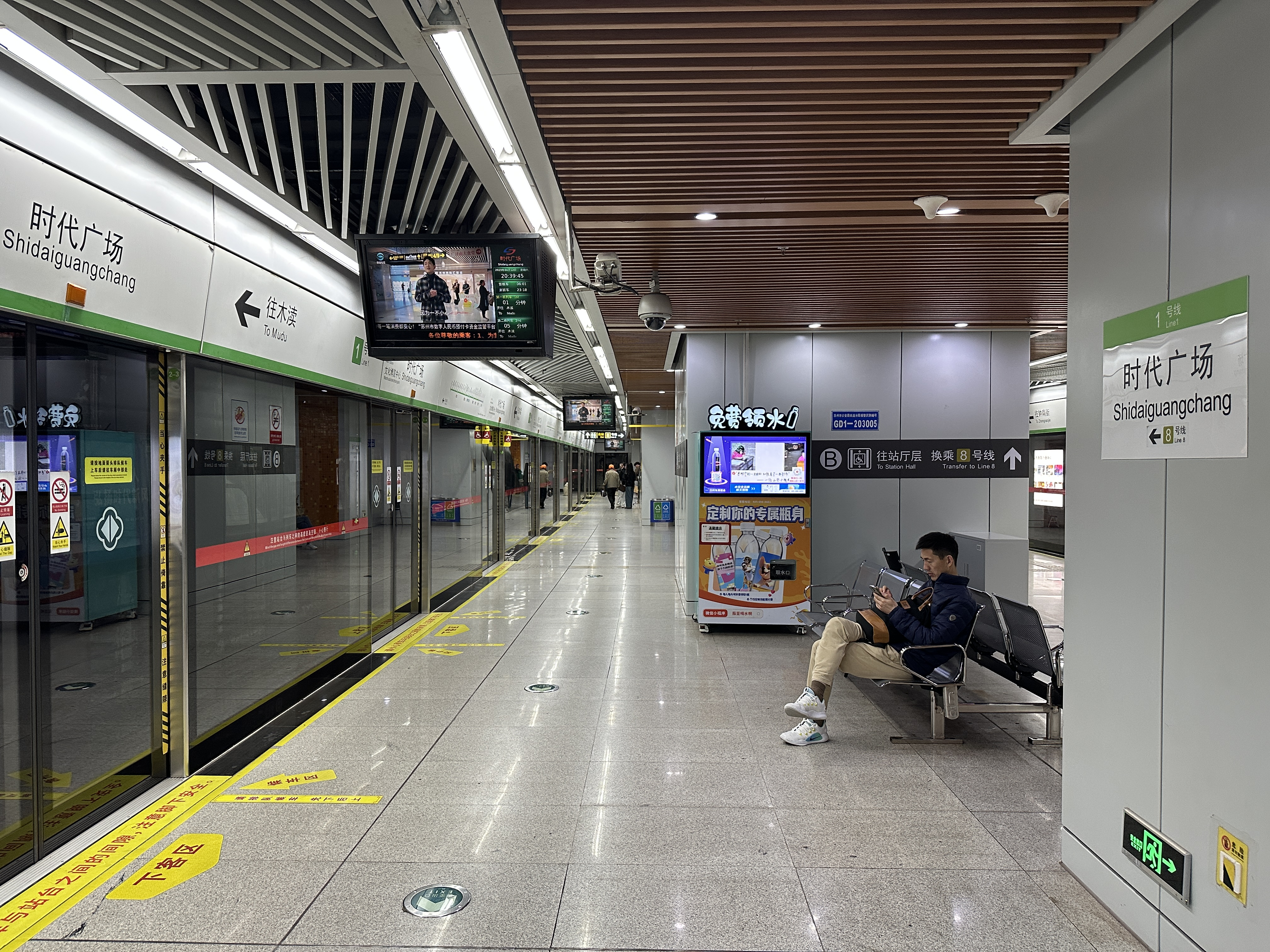
- Line 1 platform (April 2025)

Chinese name
- Simplified Chinese: 时代广场站
- Traditional Chinese: 時代廣場站
Transcriptions
Standard Mandarin
- Hanyu Pinyin: Shídài Guǎngchǎng Zhàn

General information
- Location: Suzhou Avenue East × Huachi Street (华池街); Suzhou Industrial Park, Suzhou, Jiangsu; China
- Coordinates: 31°19′28″N 120°42′31″E
- Operator: Suzhou Rail Transit Group Co., Ltd.
- Lines: Line 1 Line 8
- Platforms: 4 (2 island platforms)
- Tracks: 4

Construction
- Structure type: Underground
- Accessible: Yes

History
- Opened: 28 April 2012
- Former names: Times Square

Services
Preceding station	Suzhou Metro	Following station
Wenhuabolanzhongxin towards Mudu	Line 1	Xinghu Jie towards Zhongnanjie
Huachibang towards Xijinqiao	Line 8	Suzhou Museum of Contemporary Art towards Chefang
Location

Shidaiguangchang (Chinese: 时代广场) is a station of Line 1 and Line 8 of the Suzhou Metro. The station is located in Suzhou Industrial Park of Suzhou. It has been in use since April 28, 2012, when Line 1 first opened.

The English name of this station was Times Square. In November 2019, this station and many others were partially renamed to Shidaiguangchang. On line maps and official maps, this station's English name is listed as "Shidaiguangchang". However, ticket machines still display the name "Times Square".

== Gallery ==
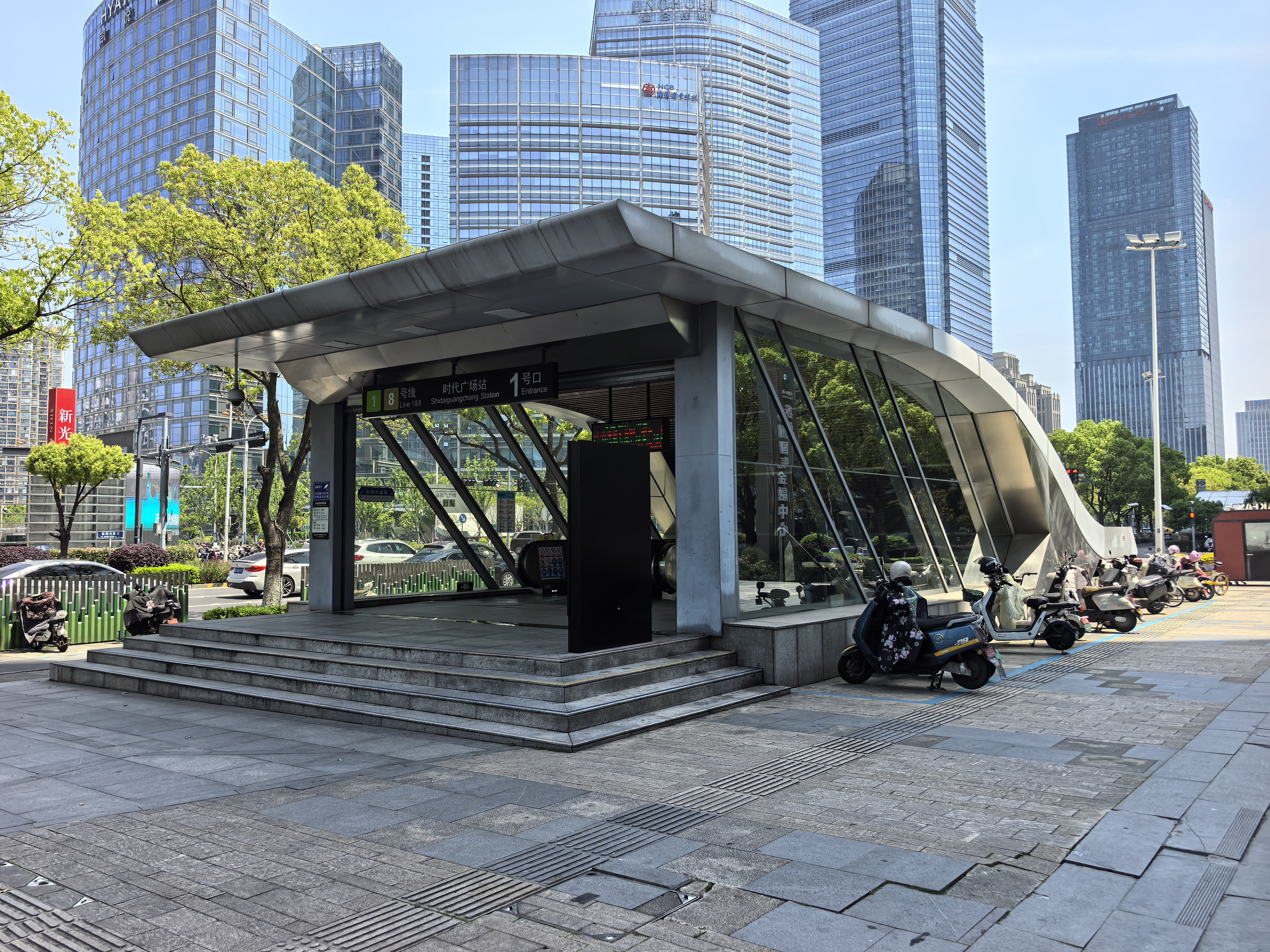
Entrance 1

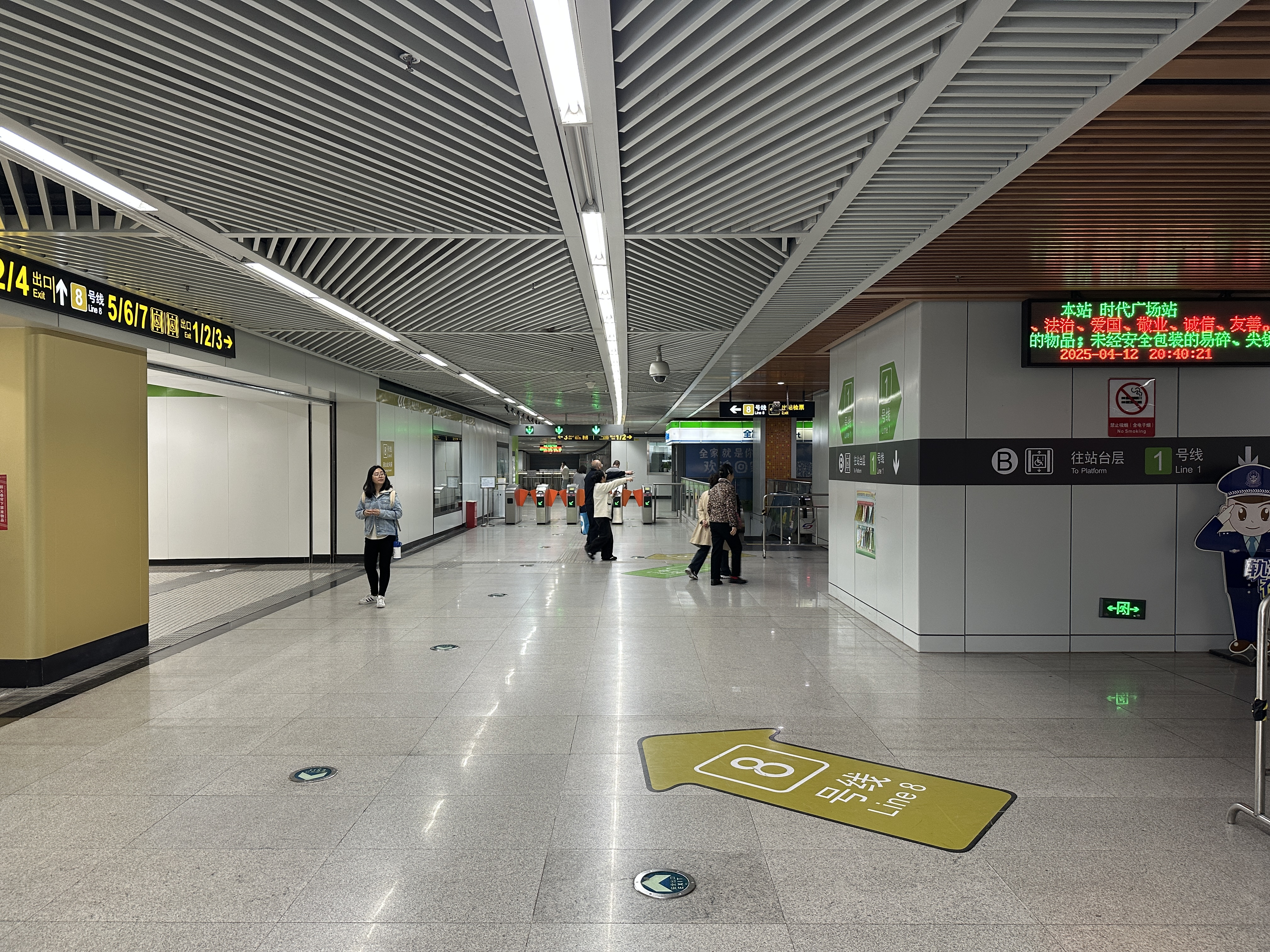
Line 1 concourse

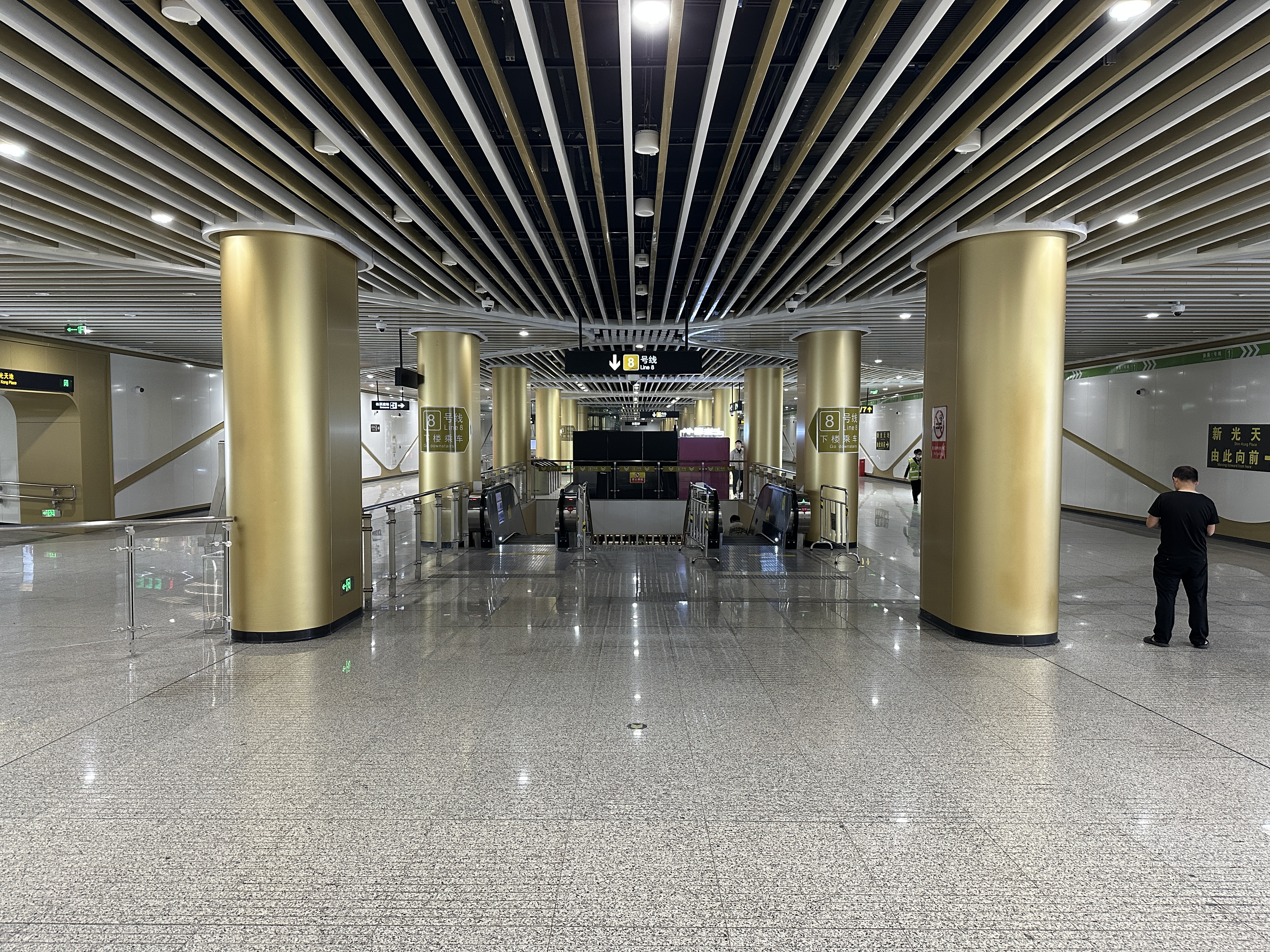
Line 8 concourse

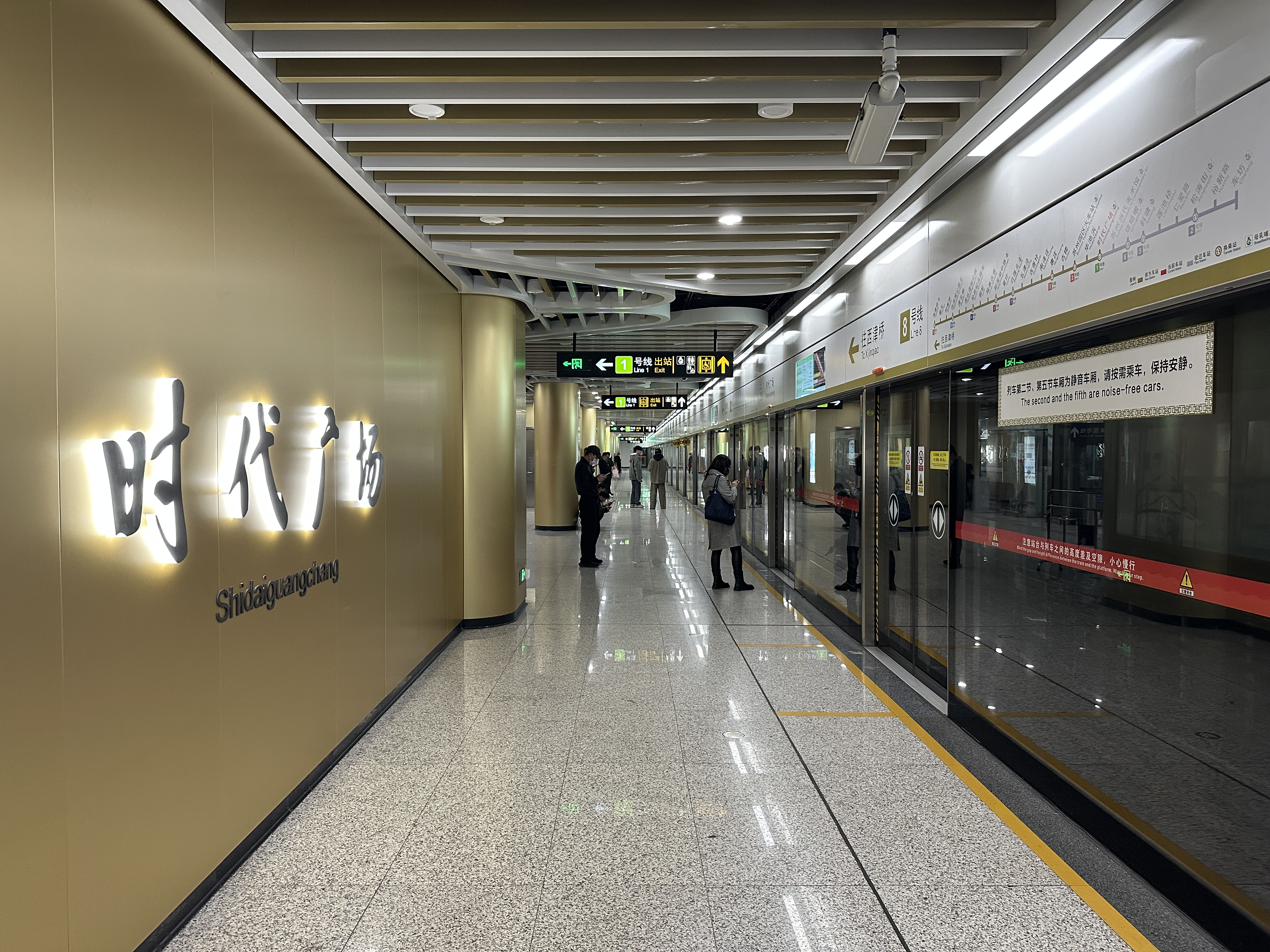
Platform for Line 8

== See also ==
- Harmony Times Square
