= Line 1 (Suzhou Metro) =

Railway line in Suzhou, Jiangsu, China

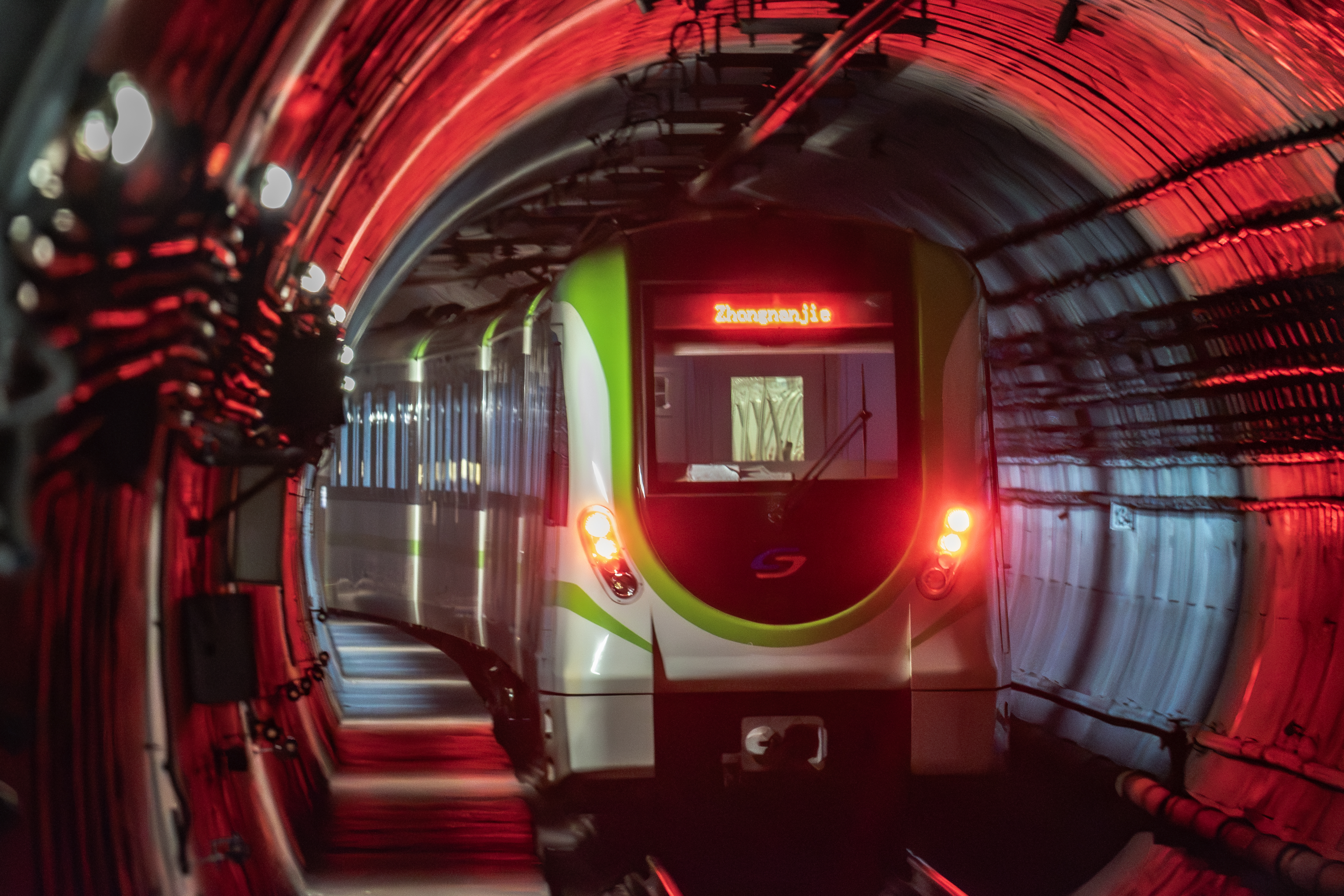
- A train of Suzhou Metro Line 1

Overview
- Status: In operation
- Owner: Suzhou Rail Transit Co., Ltd
- Termini: Mudu; Zhongnan Jie
- Stations: 24

Service
- Type: Rapid transit
- System: Suzhou Metro
- Operator(s): Suzhou Rail Transit Co., Ltd
- Daily ridership: 160,000 (average); 310,000 (maximum)

History
- Opened: 28 April 2012; 14 years ago

Technical
- Line length: 25.739 km (15.993 mi)
- Number of tracks: 2
- Character: Underground
- Track gauge: 1,435 mm (4 ft 8 1/2 in)
- Electrification: overhead wire

Line 1 is the main east–west line of the Suzhou Metro system, and it started service on April 28, 2012. Line 1 is the first rapid transit line in Suzhou and this line is operated by Suzhou Rail Transit Co., Ltd.

== Construction ==
Construction on Line 1 began on December 26, 2007, and was scheduled to be completed by 2012. It is a line running generally east–west, from Mudu in western Suzhou to Zhongnan Street in Suzhou Industrial Park. It will be 25 km long with 24 stations.
On December 30, 2011, the first 21 cars for Line 1 have been delivered.

Leqiao station

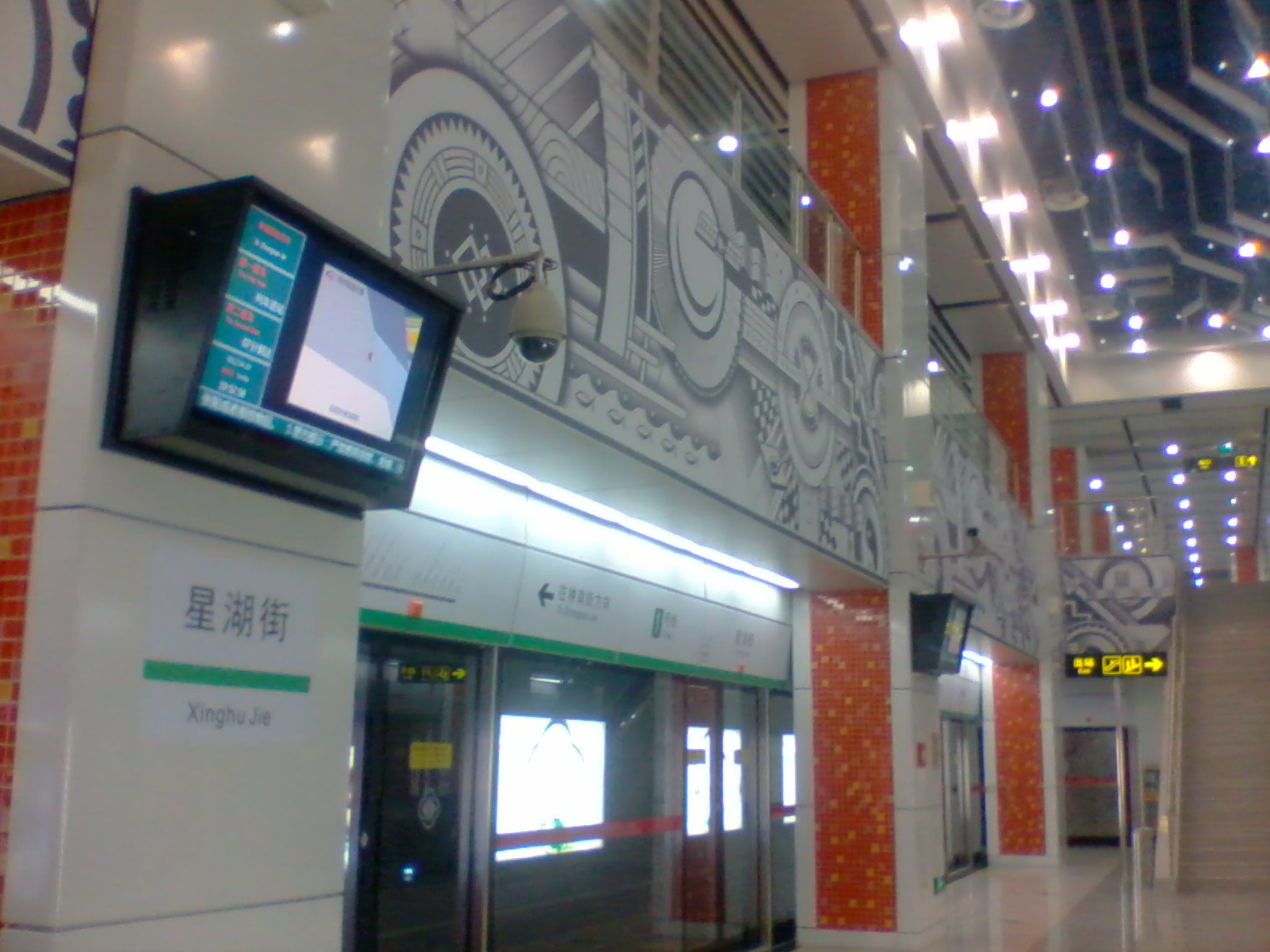
Xinghu Jie station

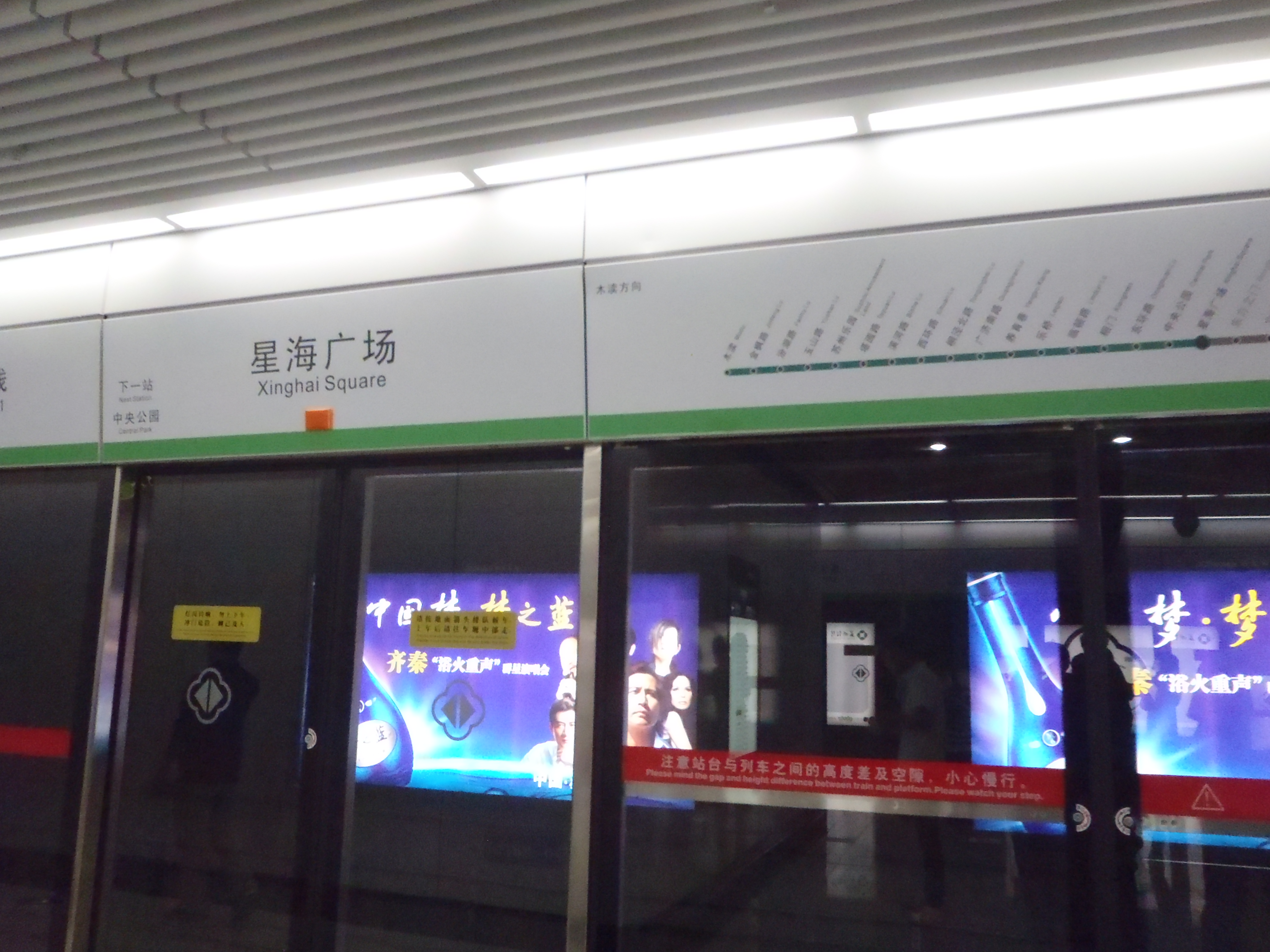
Xinghai Square, at the Mudu bound platform

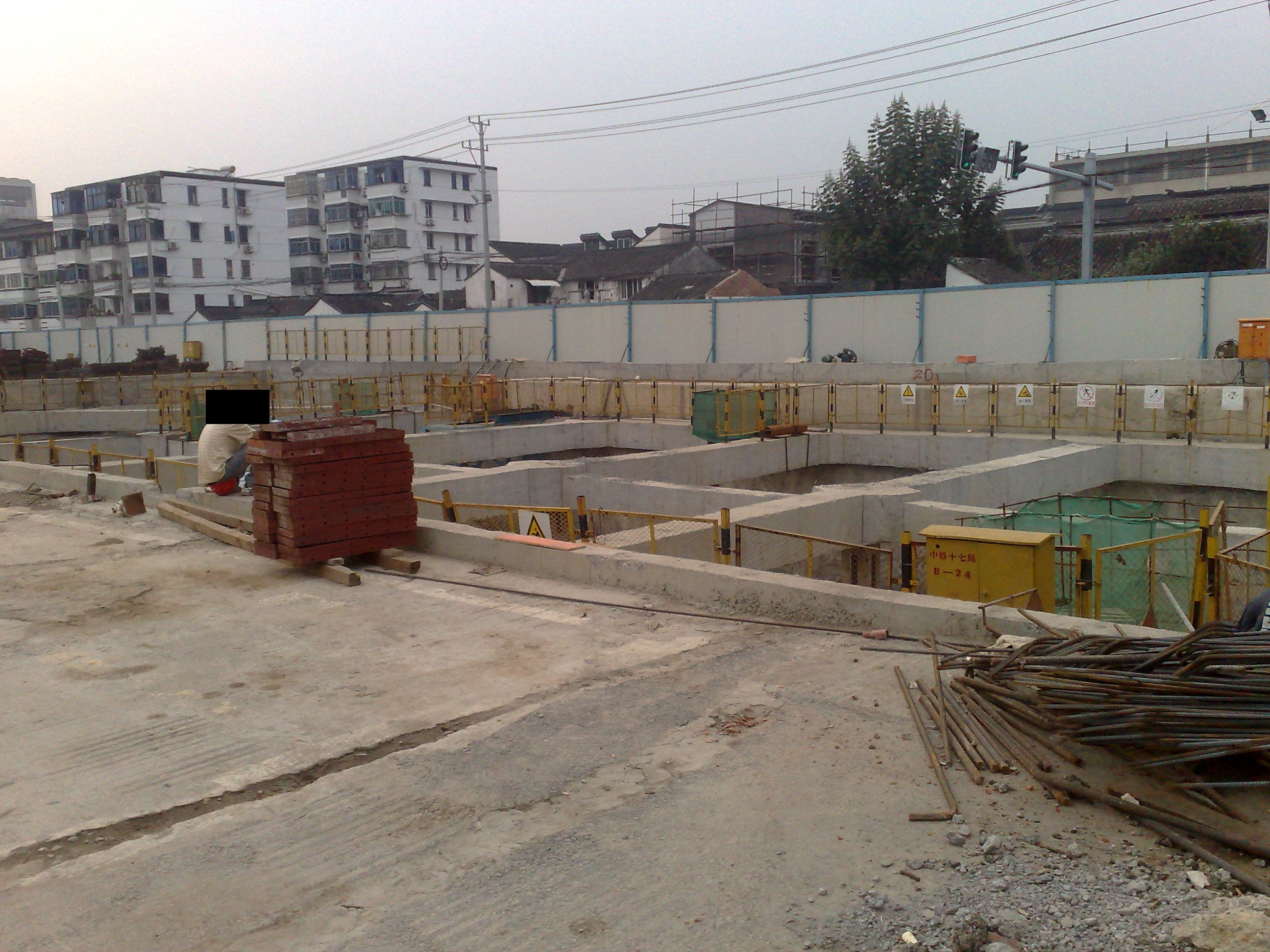
Leqiao (formerly Renmin Road) under construction

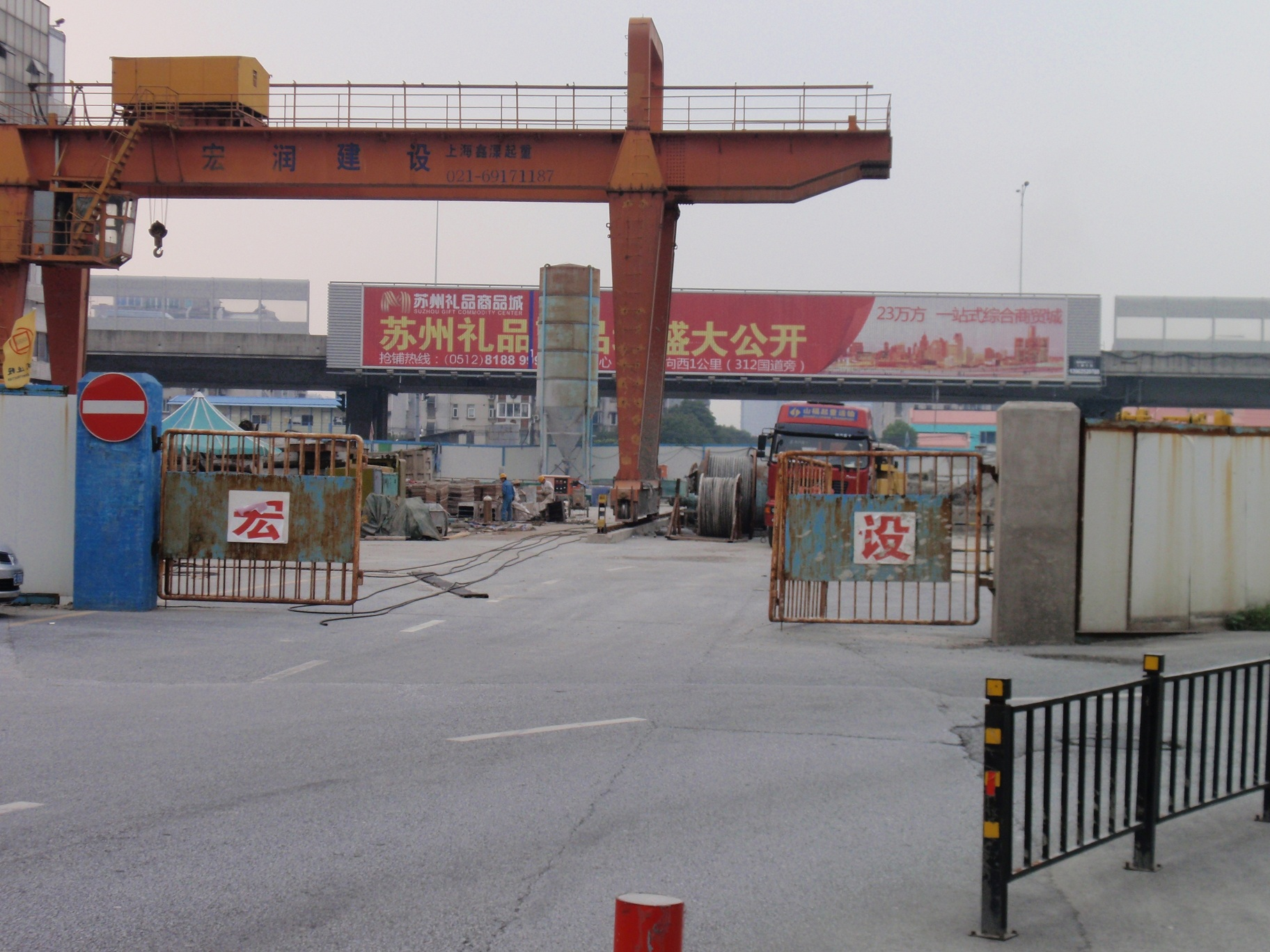
Restoration of pavement and supply of wires for electrical installation at Xihuan Lu

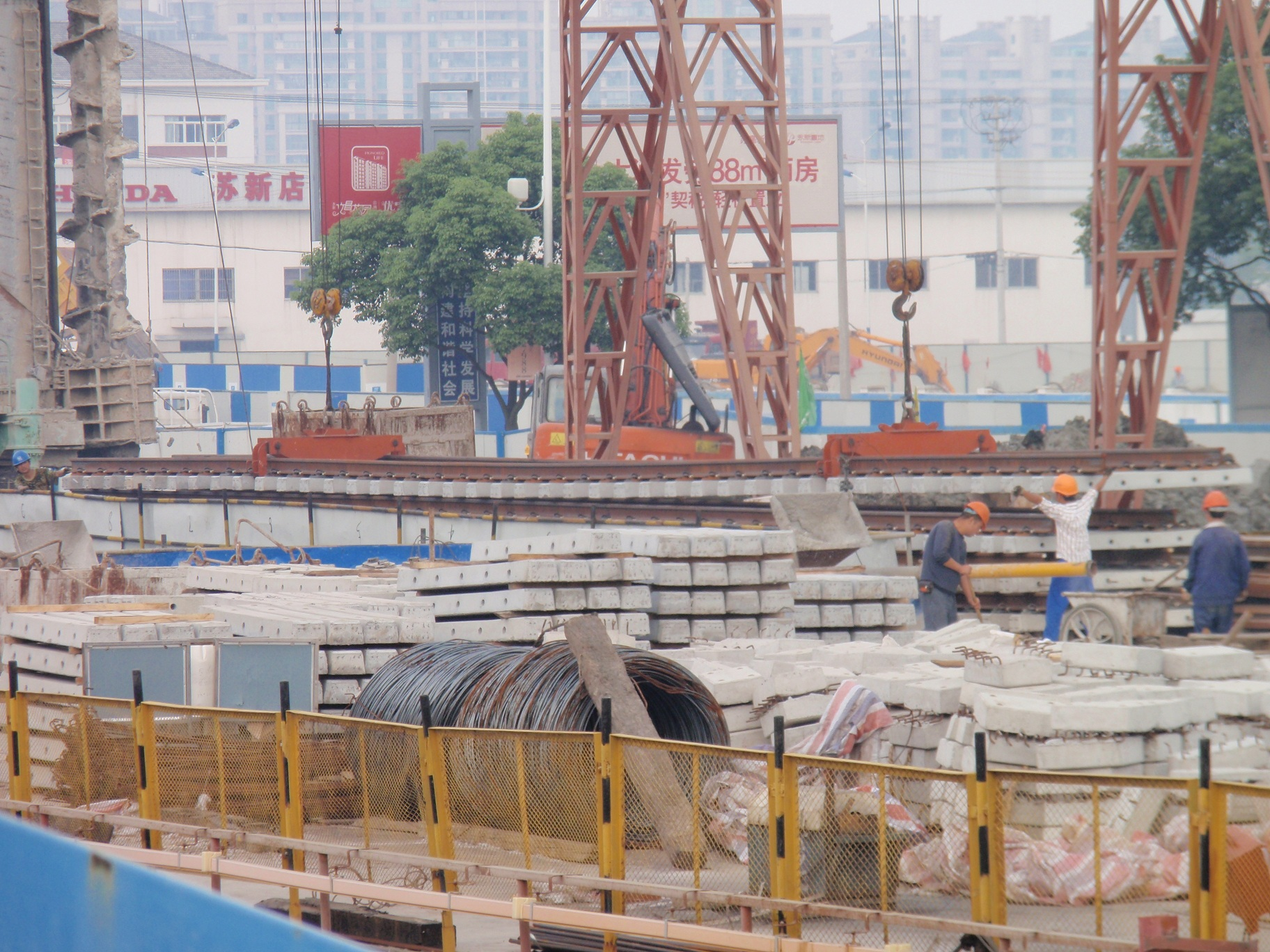
Tracklaying activities for Line 1 at Shizishan (formerly Suzhou Amusement Land) - Delivery of pre-assembled track segments

== Opening timeline ==
Segment	Commencement	Length	Station(s)	Name
Mudu — Zhongnan Jie	28 April 2012	25.739 km (15.99 mi)	24	Phase 1

== Stations ==
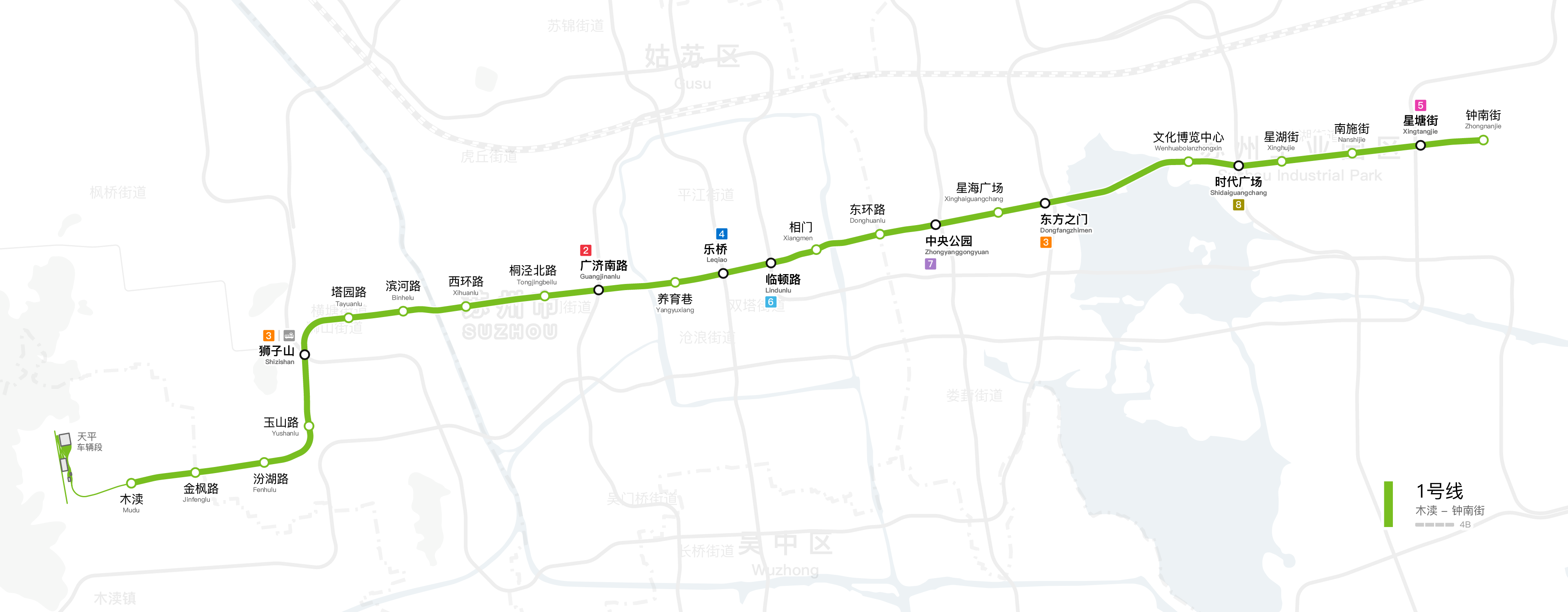

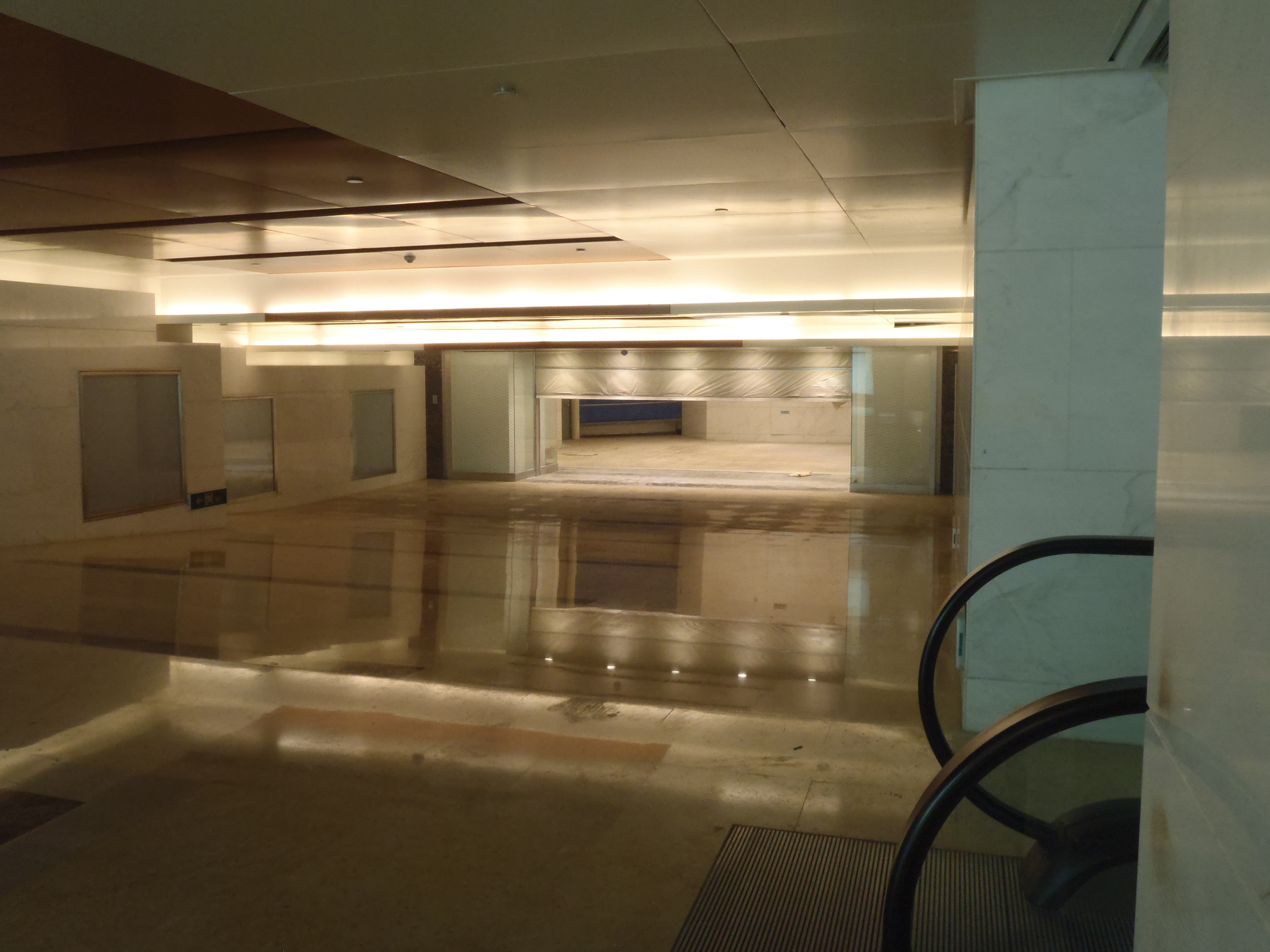
Times Square station exit 1. Behind the camera are the escalators to Jiuguang Department Store

Station name		Connections	Distance km		Location
English	Chinese	Connections	Distance km		Location
Mudu	木渎		0.000	0.000	Wuzhong
Jinfeng Lu	金枫路		1.140	1.140	Huqiu (New District)
Fenhu Lu	汾湖路		1.200	2.340	Huqiu (New District)
Yushan Lu	玉山路		1.100	3.440	Huqiu (New District)
Shizishan	狮子山	3 Tram line 1	1.240	4.680	Huqiu (New District)
Tayuan Lu	塔园路		1.170	5.850	Huqiu (New District)
Binhe Lu	滨河路		0.900	6.750	Huqiu (New District)
Xihuan Lu	西环路		1.060	7.810	Gusu
Tongjing Beilu	桐泾北路		1.360	9.170	Gusu
Guangji Nanlu	广济南路	2	1.140	10.080	Gusu
Yangyu Xiang	养育巷		1.270	11.350	Gusu
Leqiao	乐桥	4	0.800	12.150	Gusu
Lindun Lu	临顿路	6	0.810	12.960	Gusu
Xiangmen	相门		0.800	13.760	Gusu
Donghuan Lu	东环路		1.090	14.850	Gusu
Central Park	中央公园	7	0.950	15.800	SIP
Xinghai Square	星海广场		1.080	16.880	SIP
Dongfangzhimen	东方之门	3	0.810	17.690	SIP
Culture and Expo Center	文化博览中心		2.500	20.190	SIP
Times Square	时代广场	8	0.850	21.040	SIP
Xinghu Jie	星湖街		0.670	21.710	SIP
Nanshi Jie	南施街		1.260	22.970	SIP
Xingtangjie	星塘街	5	1.070	24.040	SIP
Zhongnanjie	钟南街		1.130	25.170	SIP

== Operations ==
=== Intervals ===
Weekdays & Weekends
Period	Time	Intervals
weekdays morning rush hours(Peak)	7:45 — 9:00	5m30s
weekdays evening rush hours(Peak)	17:00 — 18:10	5m30s
weekends daily rush hours(Peak)	11:00 — 19:30	5m30s
Other hours(Normal)	Exclude above rush hours	7m55s

=== First Trains & Last Trains ===
First Trains & Last Trains
First Train	First Train	Last Train	Last Train
Mudu bound for Zhongnan Jie	Zhongnan Jie bound for Mudu	Mudu bound for Zhongnan Jie	Zhongnan Jie bound for Mudu
6:10 A.M. departs from Mudu Station	6:10 A.M. departs from Zhongnan Jie Station	22:00 P.M. departs from Mudu Station	22:35 P.M. departs from Zhongnan Jie Station

=== Fares ===
Fares start at 2.00 Yuan (¥) and can take 6 kilometers (km), 6 km to 16 km every additional 1.00 Yuan (¥) can take 5 km, 16 km to 30 km every additional 1 Yuan (¥) can take 7 km, 30 km and above every additional 1 Yuan (¥) can take 9 km, so the whole journey of Line 1 is 6 Yuan (¥).

From a select start station to a select destination station, please see the following fare table.

Mudu station
2	Jinfeng Lu station																						
2	2	Fenhu Lu station																					
2	2	2	Yushan Lu station																				
2	2	2	2	Shizishan station																			
2	2	2	2	2	Tayuan Lu station																		
3	2	2	2	2	2	Binhe Lu station																	
3	3	2	2	2	2	2	Xihuan Lu station																
3	3	3	2	2	2	2	2	Tongjing Beilu station															
3	3	3	3	2	2	2	2	2	Guangji Nanlu station														
4	3	3	3	3	2	2	2	2	2	Yangyu Xiang station													
4	4	3	3	3	3	2	2	2	2	2	Leqiao station												
4	4	3	3	3	3	3	2	2	2	2	2	Lindun Lu station											
4	4	4	3	3	3	3	2	2	2	2	2	2	Xiangmen station										
4	4	4	4	3	3	3	3	2	2	2	2	2	2	Donghuan Lu station									
4	4	4	4	4	3	3	3	3	2	2	2	2	2	2	Central Park station								
5	4	4	4	4	4	3	3	3	3	2	2	2	2	2	2	Xinghai Square station							
5	5	4	4	4	4	3	3	3	3	3	2	2	2	2	2	2	Dongfangzhimen station						
5	5	5	5	4	4	4	4	4	3	3	3	3	3	2	2	2	2	Culture & Expo Center station					
5	5	5	5	5	4	4	4	4	3	3	3	3	3	3	2	2	2	2	Times Square station				
5	5	5	5	5	4	4	4	4	4	3	3	3	3	3	2	2	2	2	2	Xinghu Jie station			
5	5	5	5	5	5	5	4	4	4	4	3	3	3	3	3	3	2	2	2	2	Nanshi Jie station		
6	5	5	5	5	5	5	5	4	4	4	4	4	3	3	3	3	3	2	2	2	2	Xingtang Jie station	
6	6	5	5	5	5	5	5	5	4	4	4	4	4	3	3	3	3	2	2	2	2	2	Zhongnan Jie station

== Rolling stock ==
Fleet numbers	Year built	Time in service	Builder	Class	Number in service	No of car	Assembly	Rolling stock	Number	Depots	Line assigned	Notes
100 (25 sets)	2010-2013	2012-present	CSR Nanjing Puzhen	B	100 (25 sets)	4	Tc+Mp - Mp+Tc	PM0K	010101-012504 (0101-0125)	Tianping Depot	1	During the 2023-2024 general overhaul, all cars installed LCD displays.
88 (22 sets)	2015-2017	2017-present	CRRC Nanjing Puzhen	B	88 (22 sets)	4	Tc+Mp - Mp+Tc	PM087	012601-014704 (0126-0147)	Tianping Depot	1	
