= Zhongnanjie station =

Suzhou Metro station

Zhongnanjie 钟南街
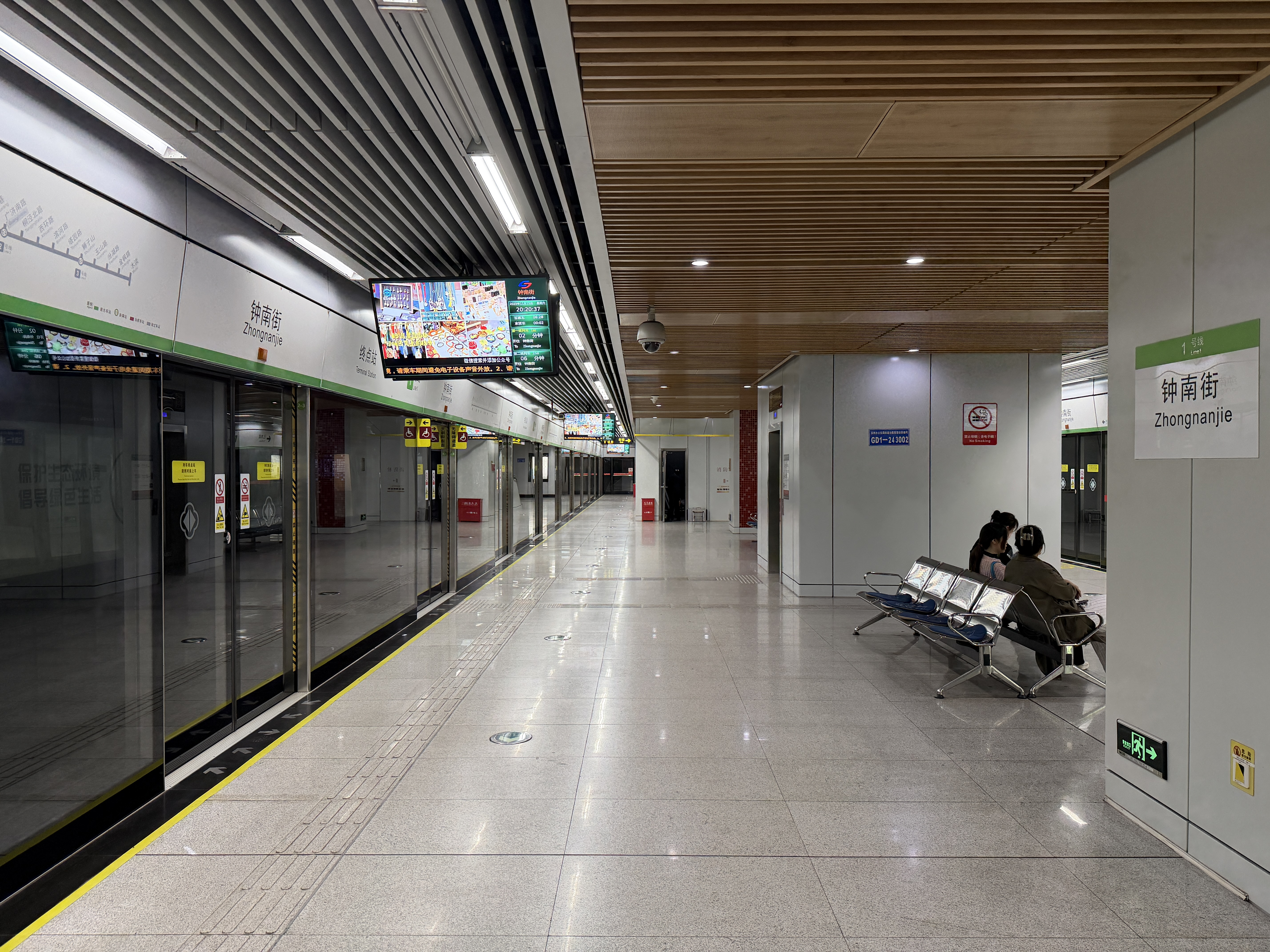
- Platform in November 2025

General information
- Location: Suzhou Avenue East (苏州大道东) × Zhongnan Street (钟南街); Suzhou Industrial Park, Suzhou, Jiangsu; China
- Coordinates: 31°19′42″N 120°45′07″E
- Operated by: Suzhou Rail Transit Co., Ltd
- Line: Line 1
- Platforms: 2 (1 island platform)

Construction
- Structure type: Underground

History
- Opened: April 28, 2012
- Previous names: Zhongnan Jie

Services
Preceding station	Suzhou Metro	Following station
Xingtangjie towards Mudu	Line 1	Terminus
Location

Zhongnanjie Station (Chinese: 钟南街站), formerly known as Zhongnan Jie Station, is the eastern terminus station of Line 1 of the Suzhou Metro. The station is located in Suzhou Industrial Park of Suzhou. It has been in use since April 28, 2012, when Line 1 first opened.
