= Mudu station =

Suzhou Metro station

Coordinates: 31°16′37″N 120°30′50″E

Mudu 木渎
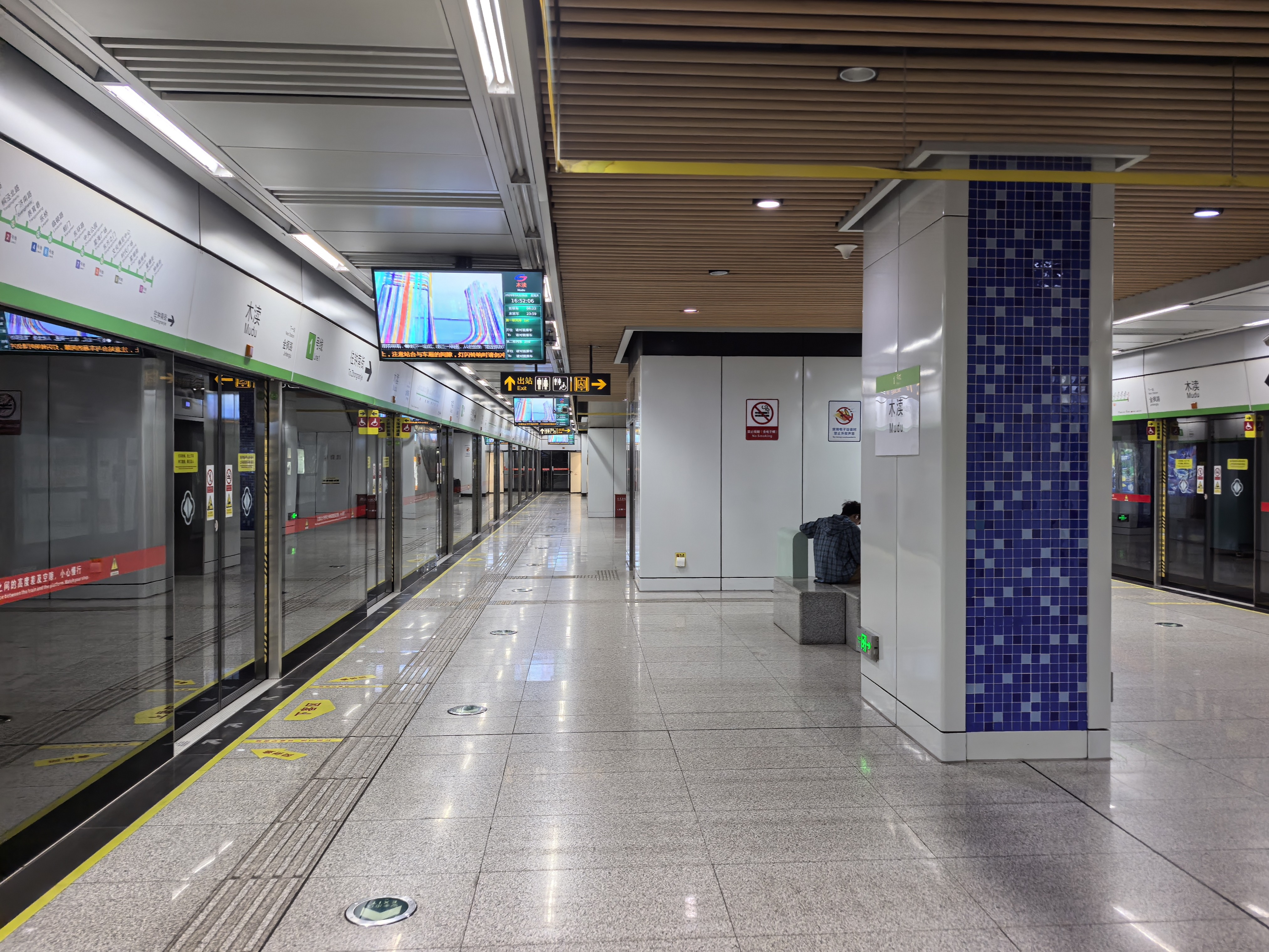

General information
- Location: Wuzhong District, Suzhou, Jiangsu; China
- Operated by: Suzhou Rail Transit Co., Ltd
- Line: Line 1
- Platforms: 2 (1 island platform)

Construction
- Structure type: Underground

History
- Opened: April 28, 2012

Services
Preceding station	Suzhou Metro	Following station
Terminus	Line 1	Jinfeng Lu towards Zhongnanjie
Location

Mudu Station (Chinese: 木渎站) is a station of Line 1 of the Suzhou Metro, and the western terminus of Line 1. The station is located in Wuzhong District of Suzhou. It has been in use since April 28, 2012, when Line 1 first opened.

== Station ==
=== Accessible information ===
- Mudu Station is a fully accessible station, this station equipped with wheelchair accessible elevators, blind paths with bumps, and wheelchair ramps. These facilities can help people with disabilities, seniors, youths, and pregnancies travel through the Suzhou Metro system.

=== Station configurations ===
L1 (First Floor/Street Level): Entrances/Exits (stairs and escalators); and elevators with wheelchair accessible ramps.

B1 (Mezzanine/Station Hall Level): Station Control Room; Customer Service; Automatic Ticket Vending Machines; Automatic Fee Collection Systems with turnstiles; stairs and escalators; and elevators with wheelchair accessible ramps.

B2 (Platform Level): Platform; toilet; stairs and escalators; elevators with wheelchair accessible ramps.

== Station layout ==
L1	Street Level	Entrances/Exits
B1	Mezzanine	Station Control, Customer Service, Fare-gates, Ticketing Machines
B2; Platform level	To Zhongnan Jie	← Line 1 towards Zhongnan Jie Next Station: Jinfeng Lu
B2; Platform level	Island platform, doors will open on the left
B2; Platform level	To Mudu	→Line 1 towards Mudu Terminal Station, no train service

== First & last trains ==
Directions	First Train	Last Train
Daily
Line 1
Towards Zhongnan Jie Station	06:10	22:00
Towards Mudu Station	Terminus(06:57)	Terminus(23:22)

== Exits information ==
- Exit 1: South-West Corner of Jinshan Lu and Zhuyuan Lu
- Exit 2: South-East Corner of Jinshan Lu and Zhuyuan Lu
- Exit 3: North-East Corner of Jinshan Lu and Zhuyuan Lu
- Exit 4: North-East Corner of Jinshan Lu and Zhuyuan Lu
- Exit 5: North-West Corner of Jinshan Lu and Zhuyuan Lu

== Local attractions ==
- Lingyan Shan tourism scenic area
- Tianping Shan tourism scenic area
- Mudu Town
- Xiangxie Holiday Hill Villa
- Zhonghuayuan Hotel
- Taohuayuan Villa

== Bus connections ==
- Bus Stop: MuDu HuanChengShuNiuZhan - Connection Bus Routes: 65, 338, 446, 508, 583, 621, 668, 691, 692
- Bus Stop: ZhongHuaYuan DaJiuDian - Connection Bus Routes: 2, 38, 64, 69, 69 Lessened Line, 326, 622, 661, 665
- Bus Stop: Nan Bang - Connection Bus Routes: 338, 662
- Bus Stop: Xinhua Lu - Connection Bus Routes: 2, 38, 64, 69, 69 Lessened Line, 326, 622, 661, 665, 4
