= List of Suzhou Metro stations =

This is a list of Suzhou Metro stations. As of the extension of Line 11 in 2023, there were 183 stations across the whole network.

== Line 1 ==
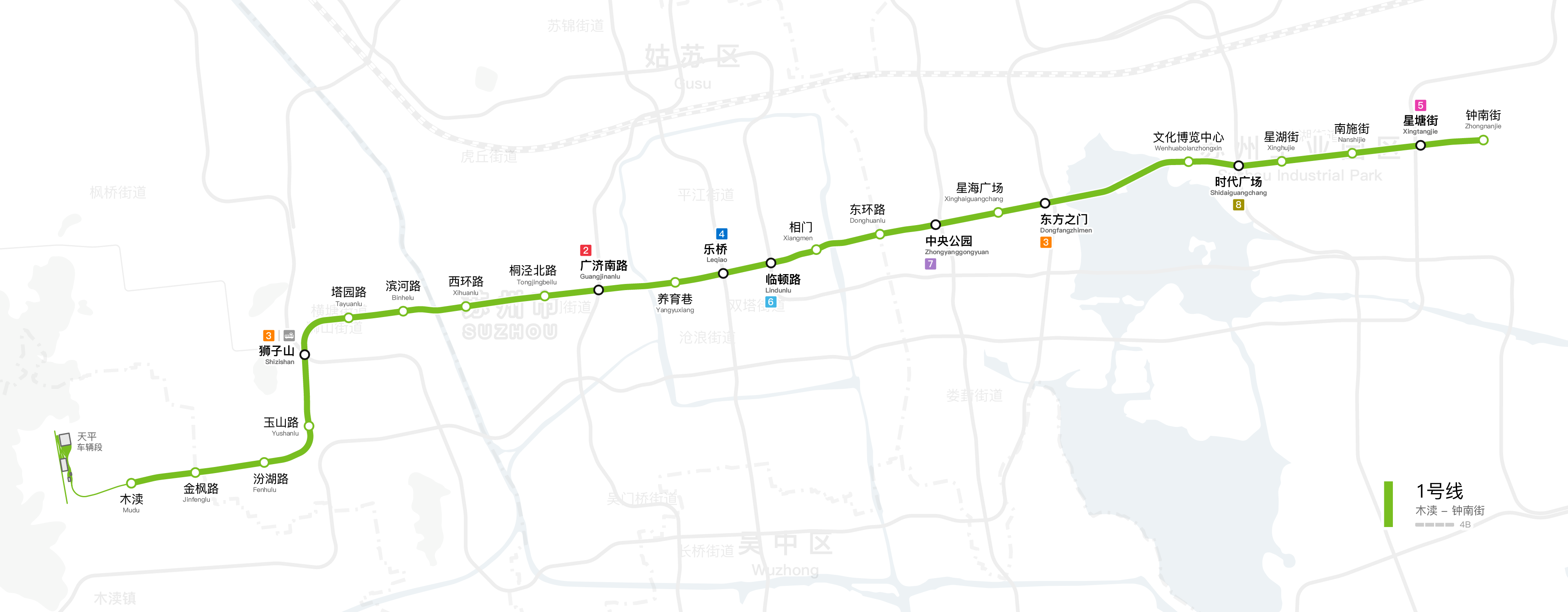

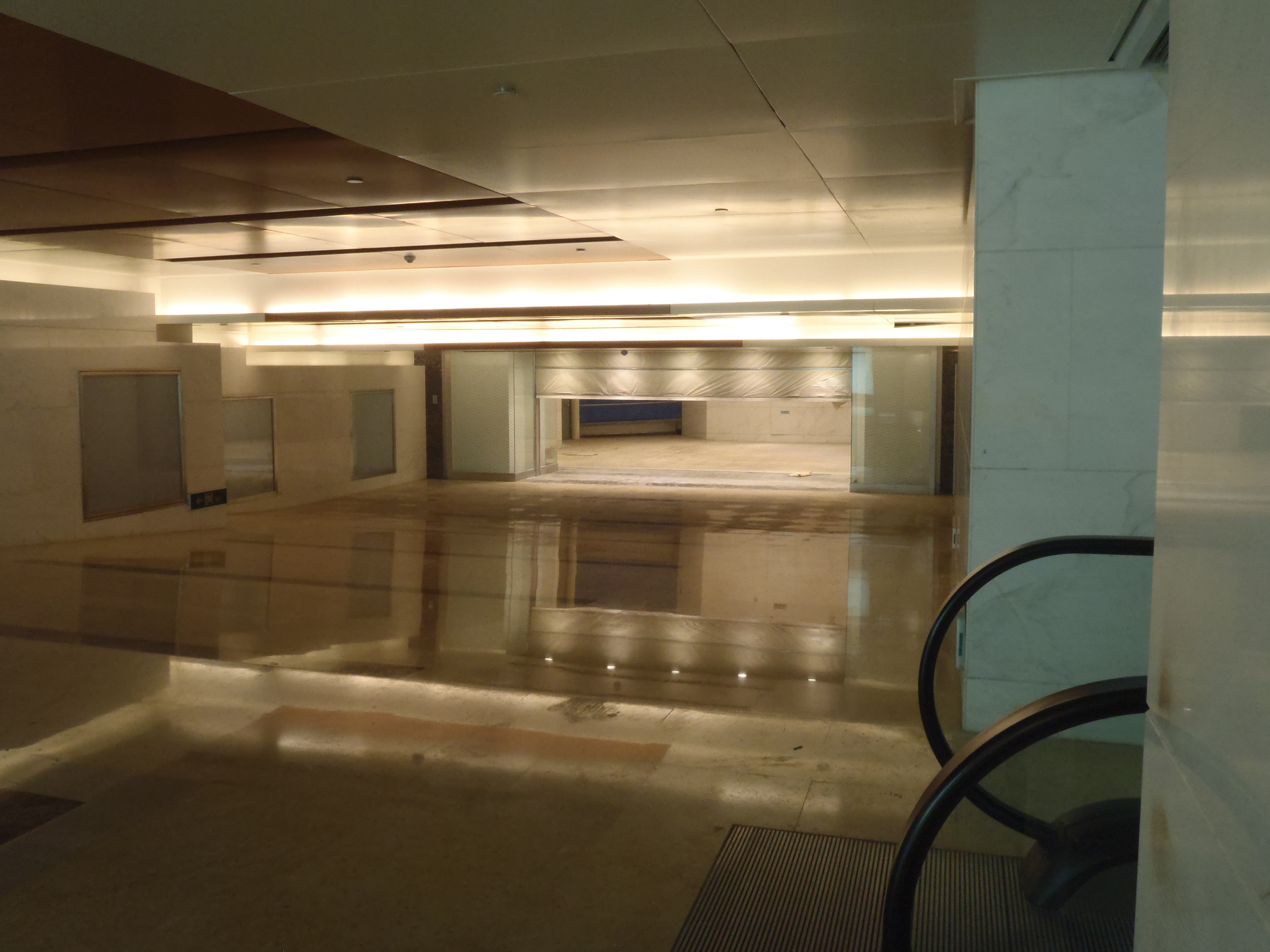
Times Square station exit 1. Behind the camera are the escalators to Jiuguang Department Store

Station name		Connections	Distance km		Location
English	Chinese	Connections	Distance km		Location
Mudu	木渎		0.000	0.000	Wuzhong
Jinfeng Lu	金枫路		1.140	1.140	Huqiu (New District)
Fenhu Lu	汾湖路		1.200	2.340	Huqiu (New District)
Yushan Lu	玉山路		1.100	3.440	Huqiu (New District)
Shizishan	狮子山	3 Tram line 1	1.240	4.680	Huqiu (New District)
Tayuan Lu	塔园路		1.170	5.850	Huqiu (New District)
Binhe Lu	滨河路		0.900	6.750	Huqiu (New District)
Xihuan Lu	西环路		1.060	7.810	Gusu
Tongjing Beilu	桐泾北路		1.360	9.170	Gusu
Guangji Nanlu	广济南路	2	1.140	10.080	Gusu
Yangyu Xiang	养育巷		1.270	11.350	Gusu
Leqiao	乐桥	4	0.800	12.150	Gusu
Lindun Lu	临顿路	6	0.810	12.960	Gusu
Xiangmen	相门		0.800	13.760	Gusu
Donghuan Lu	东环路		1.090	14.850	Gusu
Central Park	中央公园	7	0.950	15.800	SIP
Xinghai Square	星海广场		1.080	16.880	SIP
Dongfangzhimen	东方之门	3	0.810	17.690	SIP
Culture and Expo Center	文化博览中心		2.500	20.190	SIP
Times Square	时代广场	8	0.850	21.040	SIP
Xinghu Jie	星湖街		0.670	21.710	SIP
Nanshi Jie	南施街		1.260	22.970	SIP
Xingtangjie	星塘街	5	1.070	24.040	SIP
Zhongnanjie	钟南街		1.130	25.170	SIP

== Line 2 ==
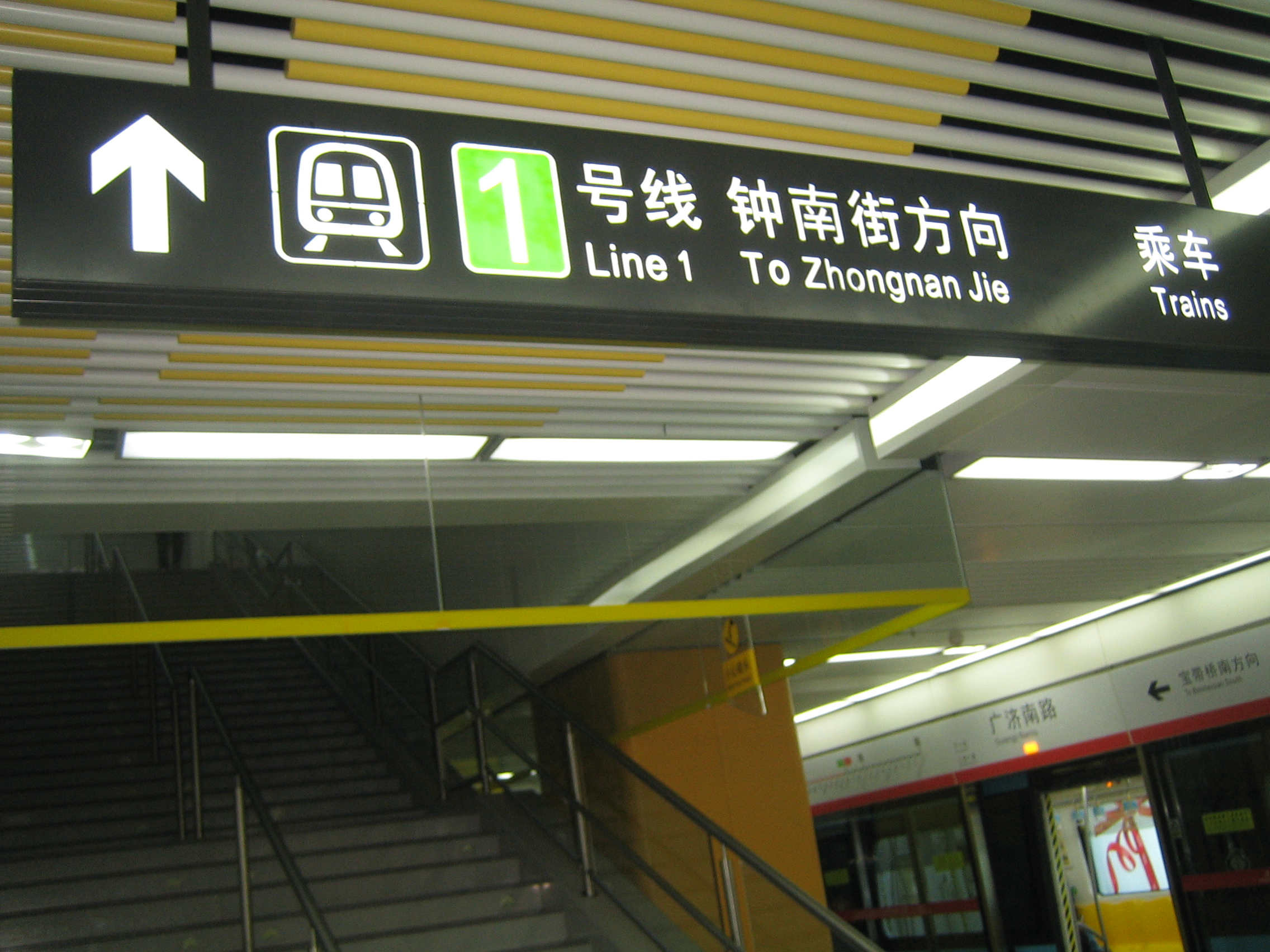
Interchange signage in Guangji Nanlu station

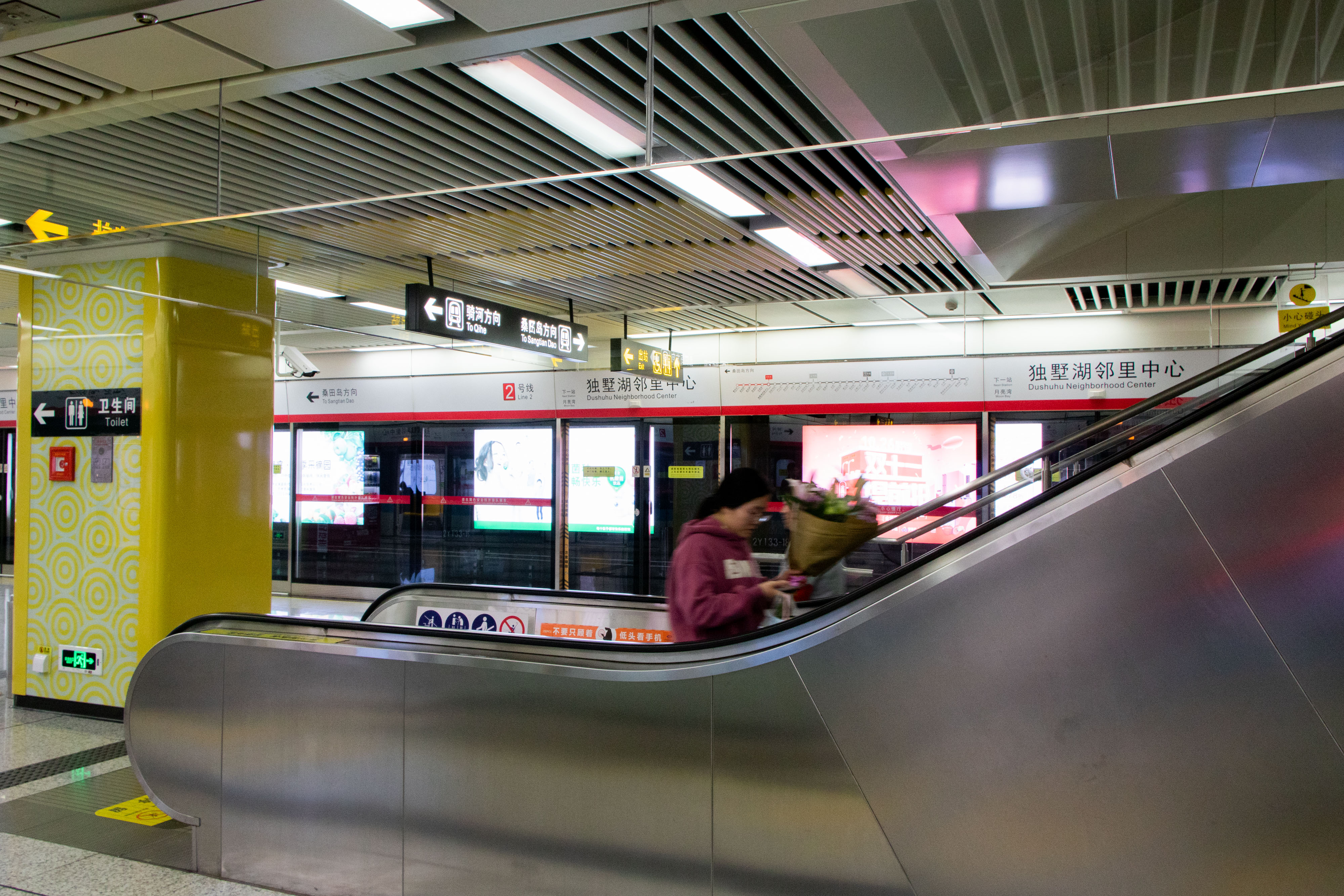
Platform of Dushuhu Neighborhood Center station

Station name		Connections	Distance km		Location
English	Chinese	Connections	Distance km		Location
Qihe	骑河		0.00	0.00	Xiangcheng
Fuxianglu	富翔路		0.88	0.88	Xiangcheng
Suzhoubei Railway Station	高铁苏州北站	7 10; OHH	1.08	1.96	Xiangcheng
Dawan	大湾		1.51	3.47	Xiangcheng
Fuyuan Lu	富元路		1.98	5.45	Xiangcheng
Likou	蠡口		1.70	7.15	Xiangcheng
Xutu Gang	徐图港		1.40	8.55	Xiangcheng
Yangchenghu Zhonglu	阳澄湖中路	8	1.00	9.55	Xiangcheng
Lumu	陆慕		1.93	11.48	Xiangcheng
Pinglonglu East	平泷路东		1.64	13.12	Xiangcheng
Pinghelu	平河路	6	0.81	13.93	Gusu
Suzhou Railway Station	苏州火车站	4 SZH	1.06	14.99	Gusu
Shantang Jie	山塘街		1.62	16.61	Gusu
Shi Lu	石路		0.96	17.57	Gusu
Guangji Nanlu	广济南路	1	0.81	18.38	Gusu
Sanxiang Square	三香广场		0.88	19.26	Gusu
Laodonglu	劳动路	5	0.62	19.88	Gusu
Xujiang Lu	胥江路		0.77	20.65	Gusu
Tongjing Park	桐泾公园		0.73	21.38	Gusu
Youlian	友联		1.24	22.62	Gusu
Panlilu	盘蠡路	3	1.10	23.72	Wuzhong
Xinjia Qiao	新家桥		1.08	24.80	Wuzhong
Shihu Donglu	石湖东路	4	1.62	26.42	Wuzhong
Baodaiqiao South	宝带桥南		1.88	28.30	Wuzhong
Yinzhong Lu	尹中路		1.50	29.80	Wuzhong
Guoxiang	郭巷	7	0.90	30.70	Wuzhong
Guoyuan Lu	郭苑路		1.02	31.72	Wuzhong
Yinshan Hu	尹山湖		1.07	32.79	Wuzhong
Dushuhu South	独墅湖南		0.89	33.68	Wuzhong
Dushuhu Neighborhood Center	独墅湖邻里中心		2.03	35.71	SIP
Moon Bay	月亮湾		0.91	36.62	SIP
Songtaojie	松涛街	8	1.23	37.85	SIP
Jingu Lu	金谷路		1.75	39.60	SIP
Jinshang Lu	金尚路	6	1.33	40.93	SIP
Sangtiandao	桑田岛	6	1.07	42.00	SIP

== Line 3 ==
=== Service routes ===
- Suzhou Xinqu Railway Station — Huaqiao (Line 11)
- Suzhou Xinqu Railway Station — Fengtingdadao, in rush hours

Service routes		Station name		Connections	Distance km		Location
Service routes		English	Chinese	Connections	Distance km		Location
●	●	Suzhou Xinqu Railway Station	苏州新区火车站	6 ITH; Tram line 2	0.00	0.00	Huqiu
●	●	Huichanglu	惠昌路				Huqiu
●	●	Wenchanglu	文昌路	Tram line 2 (branch)			Huqiu
●	●	Changting	长亭				Huqiu
●	●	Tongdun	铜墩				Huqiu
●	●	Mayunlu	马运路				Huqiu
●	●	Xijinqiao	西津桥	8 9			Huqiu
●	●	Heshan	何山				Huqiu
●	●	Shizishan	狮子山	1 Tram line 1			Huqiu
●	●	Shishanlu	狮山路				Huqiu
●	●	Shajinqiao	沙金桥				Huqiu
●	●	Suoshanqiao West	索山桥西	5			Huqiu
●	●	Hengshan	横山				Huqiu
●	●	Hengtang	横塘				Huqiu
●	●	Shihu North	石湖北				Huqiu
●	●	Xinguo	新郭				Gusu
●	●	Panlilu	盘蠡路	2			Wuzhong
●	●	Baodailu	宝带路	4			Wuzhong
●	●	Yingchunlu	迎春路				Wuzhong
●	●	Beiganglu	北港路				Wuzhong
●	●	Tongyuanlu South	通园路南	7			SIP
●	●	Shupulu North	墅浦路北				SIP
●	●	Dongzhenlu	东振路				SIP
●	●	Jinsheqiao	金厍桥	5			SIP
●	●	Ligongdi West	李公堤西	6			SIP
●	●	Dongfangzhimen	东方之门	1			SIP
●	●	Yanyuqiao	烟雨桥	9			SIP
●	●	Nibang	倪浜				SIP
●	●	Tangzhuang	唐庄	8			SIP
●	●	Kuatang	跨塘				SIP
●	●	Suzhou Yuanqu Railway Station	苏州园区火车站	8 KAH			SIP
●	●	Fangwanjie	方湾街				SIP
●	●	Fenghelu	丰和路				SIP
●	●	Shuangmajie	双马街				SIP
●	●	Fengtingdadao	葑亭大道	5			SIP
	●	Gexiangjie	戈巷街				SIP
	●	Weiting	唯亭				SIP
	↓	Through service to/from Huaqiao on 11					

=== Through service ===
Through service between Line 3 and Line 11 started on December 23, 2023. During 23 December 2023 and 29 June 2024, with through train to/from line 11, Gexiangjie and Weiting were only served by Line 11 trains.

== Line 4 ==
Station name		Connections	Distance km		Location
English	Chinese	Connections	Distance km		Location
Longdaobang	龙道浜		0.00	0.00	Xiangcheng
Zhangzhuang	张庄		1.29	1.29	Xiangcheng
Yaoxiang	姚祥		0.83	2.12	Xiangcheng
Huolidao	活力岛		1.68	3.80	Xiangcheng
Sunwu Jinianyuan	孙武纪念园	8	1.44	5.24	Xiangcheng
Pinglonglu West	平泷路西		1.85	7.09	Gusu
Sujin	苏锦	6	1.09	8.18	Gusu
Suzhou Railway Station	苏州火车站	2 SZH	0.97	9.15	Gusu
Beisita	北寺塔	9	1.45	10.60	Gusu
Chayuanchang	察院场		0.95	11.55	Gusu
Leqiao	乐桥	1	0.54	12.09	Gusu
Sanyuanfang	三元坊		1.01	13.10	Gusu
Nanmen	南门	5	0.79	13.89	Gusu
Renminqiao South	人民桥南		0.67	14.56	Gusu
Tuanjieqiao	团结桥		1.00	15.56	Wuzhong
Baodailu	宝带路	3	0.98	16.54	Wuzhong
Shihu Donglu	石湖东路	2	1.60	18.14	Wuzhong
Hongzhuang	红庄	7	1.90	20.04	Wuzhong
Qingshuwan	清树湾		1.68	21.72	Wujiang
Huagang	花港		2.04	23.76	Wujiang
Jiangling Xilu	江陵西路		2.94	26.70	Wujiang
Jiangxing Xilu	江兴西路		1.39	28.09	Wujiang
Liuhong Lu	流虹路		1.75	29.84	Wujiang
Lize Lu	笠泽路		0.81	30.65	Wujiang
Gujiadang	顾家荡	14	1.16	31.81	Wujiang
Suzhouwan East	苏州湾东		1.00	32.81	Wujiang
Songling Dadao	松陵大道		1.12	33.93	Wujiang
Wujiang Renmin Guangchang	吴江人民广场		1.89	35.82	Wujiang
Wujiang Coach Station	吴江汽车站		1.83	37.65	Wujiang
Pangjin Lu	庞金路		1.73	39.38	Wujiang
Tongli	同里		1.89	41.27	Wujiang

== Line 5 ==
Station name		Connections	Distance km		Location
English	Chinese	Connections	Distance km		Location
Taihu Xiangshan	太湖香山		0.00	0.00	Wuzhong
Huadun	花墩				Wuzhong
Jinqiao	津桥				Wuzhong
Xukou	胥口				Wuzhong
Maopenglu East	茅蓬路东				Wuzhong
Xujiaqiao	许家桥				Wuzhong
Lingyanshan	灵岩山				Wuzhong
Duchuanqiao	渎川桥				Wuzhong
Dazhiqiao	大治桥				Wuzhong
Xikuatang	西跨塘				Wuzhong
Shicheng	石城				Huqiu
Luoxingqiao	落星桥				Huqiu
Suoshanqiao West	索山桥西	3			Huqiu
Shuangqiao	双桥				Gusu
Laodonglu	劳动路	2			Gusu
Xinshiqiao	新市桥				Gusu
Nanmen	南门	4			Gusu
Nanyuanbeilu	南园北路				Gusu
Zhuhuiqiao	竹辉桥				Gusu
Hehuadang	荷花荡				SIP
Huangtiandang	黄天荡	7			SIP
Jinsheqiao	金厍桥	3			SIP
Xingbojie	星波街				SIP
Ligongdi South	李公堤南				SIP
Jinhu	金湖				SIP
Hualian	华莲				SIP
Xietang	斜塘	8			SIP
Suzhou Olympic Sports Centre	苏州奥体中心	6			SIP
Fangzhougongyuan	方洲公园				SIP
Xingtangjie	星塘街	1			SIP
Longdun	龙墩				SIP
Dongshahu	东沙湖				SIP
Fengtingdadao	葑亭大道	3			SIP
Yangchenghu South	阳澄湖南				SIP

== Line 6 ==
Due to construction of Suzhou East railway station of the Tongsujiayong railway, Huayun station is not yet opened for service, where also causes the scissors crossover of Sangtiandao unusable. Trains could not turn around there. As such, line 6 is currently operating as two sections, with transfer at Nanxiebu station:

- Suzhou Xinqu Railway Station - Nanxiebu
- Nanxiebu - Sangtiandao, under single track for shuttle service.

Service routes		Station name		Connections	Distance km		Location
Service routes		English	Chinese	Connections	Distance km		Location
●		Suzhou Xinqu Railway Station	苏州新区火车站	3 ITH; Tram line 2	0.00	0.00	New District
●		Baofeng	保丰				New District
●		Fuqiang	富强				Gusu
●		Changjing	长泾				Gusu
●		Baiyangwangongyuan	白洋湾公园	8			Gusu
●		Jinjidun	金鸡墩				Gusu
●		Huqiu	虎丘				Gusu
●		Qingshanqiaobang	清山桥浜				Gusu
●		Jiangxingqiao South	江星桥南				Gusu
●		Sujin	苏锦	4			Gusu
●		Pinghe Lu	平河路	2			Gusu
●		Meixiang	梅巷				Gusu
●		Humble Administrator's Garden Suzhou Museum	拙政园苏博				Gusu
●		Xuanqiaoxiang	悬桥巷				Gusu
●		Lindun Lu	临顿路	1			Gusu
●		Wangxingqiao Soochow University	望星桥苏大				Gusu
●		Xujiabang	徐家浜				SIP
●		Reyunqiao	惹云桥	7			SIP
●		Qiutangbang	秋塘浜				SIP
●		Ligongdi West	李公堤西	3			SIP
●		Qiongjidun	琼姬墩	8			SIP
●		Nanshigongyuan South	南施公园南				SIP
●		Suzhou Olympic Sports Centre	苏州奥体中心	5			SIP
●		Children's Hospital	儿童医院总院				SIP
●		Hanqingqiao	涵青桥				SIP
●		Jinjiayan	金家堰				SIP
●		Beixiebu	北斜步				SIP
●	●	Nanxiebu	南斜步				SIP
	●	Jinshang Lu	金尚路	2			SIP
	●	Sangtiandao	桑田岛	2			SIP
		Huayun	华云				SIP

== Line 7 ==
Station name		Connections	Distance km		Location	Notes
English	Chinese	Connections	Distance km		Location	Notes
Chunqiulu	春秋路		-	0	Xiangcheng	Northern extension. Under construction
Chunguanglu	春光路		-		Xiangcheng	Northern extension. Under construction
Yongchanglu	永昌路				Xiangcheng	Northern extension. Under construction
Shiganglu	石港路				Xiangcheng	Northern extension. Under construction
Moyang	莫阳	4	-		Xiangcheng	Operation postponed
Zhujing	朱泾				Xiangcheng	Operation postponed
Suzhoubei Railway Station	高铁苏州北站	2 10			Xiangcheng	Operation postponed
Xuenan	雪南				Xiangcheng	Operation postponed
Changlou	常楼				Xiangcheng	
Dengyun	登云				Xiangcheng	
Litanghelu	蠡塘河路				Xiangcheng	
Chunshenhudonglu	春申湖东路				Xiangcheng	
Huayuanlu East	华元路东				Xiangcheng	
Baidang North	白荡北	8			Xiangcheng	
Baidang South	白荡南				Xiangcheng	
Banjing	板泾				SIP	
Yangjing	洋泾				SIP	
Jicuiqiao	积翠桥				SIP	
Central Park	中央公园	1			SIP	
Reyunqiao	惹云桥	6			SIP	
Huangtiandang	黄天荡	5			SIP	
Loufeng	娄葑				SIP	
Qunli	群力				SIP	
Tongyuanlu South	通园路南	3			SIP	
Linjiatan	林家潭				Wuzhong	
Guoxiang	郭巷	2			Wuzhong	
Yinshan	尹山				Wuzhong	
Jinjiaqiao South	金家桥南				Wuzhong	
Fengjinlu	枫津路				Wuzhong	
Hongzhuang	红庄	4			Wuzhong	
Lishu	蠡墅				Wuzhong	
Shihu Moshe	石湖莫舍				Wuzhong	
Yuexi	越溪				Wuzhong	
Wenxi Lu	文溪路				Wuzhong	
Tian'edang Lu	天鹅荡路				Wuzhong	
Suzhouwan North	苏州湾北				Wuzhong	
Muli	木里				Wuzhong	

== Line 8 ==
Station name		Connections	Distance km		Location
English	Chinese	Connections	Distance km		Location
Xijinqiao	西津桥	3	-	0	Huqiu
Xinyuan	新元				Huqiu
Shijiaqiao	时家桥				Gusu
Baiyangwangongyuan	白洋湾公园	6			Gusu
Hubeilu	虎北路				Gusu
Huqiushidigongyuan	虎丘湿地公园				Xiangcheng
Sunwu Jinianyuan	孙武纪念园	4			Xiangcheng
Yuyao	御窑				Xiangcheng
Lumu Guxiang	陆慕古巷				Xiangcheng
Yangchenghuzhonglu	阳澄湖中路	2			Xiangcheng
Xiawei	夏圩				Xiangcheng
Baidang North	白荡北	7			Xiangcheng
Wucongjing	五潨泾				Xiangcheng
Guxiangwei	古香圩				Xiangcheng
Nanzezhuang	南泽庄				SIP
Tangzhuang	唐庄	3			SIP
Gulou	古楼				SIP
Suzhou Yuanqu Railway Station	苏州园区火车站	3			SIP
Huachibang	华池浜				SIP
Times Square	时代广场	1			SIP
Suzhou Museum of Contemporary Art	苏州当代美术馆				SIP
Qiongjidun	琼姬墩	6			SIP
Xietang	斜塘	5			SIP
Lianchiqiao	莲池桥				SIP
Ren'ailu	仁爱路				SIP
Songtaojie	松涛街	2			SIP
Yuxinlu	裕新路				SIP
Chefang	车坊				SIP

== Line 11 ==
=== Service routes ===
- Local service (L): Suzhou Xinqu Railway Station (Line 3) — Huaqiao
- Rapid Service (R): Gongqing — Huaqiao, eastern bound in the morning, and western bound in the night

Service Routes		Station name		Connections	Distance km	Location
L	R	English	Chinese	Connections	Distance km	Location
↑	Through service to/from Suzhou Xinqu Railway Station on 3					
●		Weiting	唯亭		0.00	SIP
●		Caoxieshan	草鞋山		2.12	SIP
●		Yangchenghu East	阳澄湖东		6.35	Kunshan
●		Zhengyi	正仪	AIH	7.95	Kunshan
●		Lianhugongyuan	莲湖公园		9.95	Kunshan
●		Zuchongzhigongyuan	祖冲之公园		11.27	Kunshan
●		Kunshan Wenhuayishuzhongxin	昆山文化艺术中心		12.18	Kunshan
●	●	Gongqing	共青		13.48	Kunshan
●	●	Jiangpu	江浦		14.41	Kunshan
●	|	Baimajing	白马泾		15.82	Kunshan
●	●	Yushanguangchang	玉山广场		17.20	Kunshan
●	|	Xiuyi	绣衣		18.55	Kunshan
●	●	Kunshan Chengshiguangchang	昆山城市广场		19.64	Kunshan
●	|	Jinpudaqiao East	金浦大桥东		20.86	Kunshan
●	|	Shunfanbeilu	顺帆北路		21.99	Kunshan
●	|	Yuchijing	鱼池泾		22.92	Kunshan
●	|	Baihetan	白河潭		23.94	Kunshan
●	●	Bingxi	兵希		25.04	Kunshan
●	|	Xiajiahegongyuan	夏驾河公园		26.33	Kunshan
●	|	Shengzhuang	盛庄		27.92	Kunshan
●	|	Zhangjilu South	章基路南		29.41	Kunshan
●	|	Xiaqiao	夏桥		31.25	Kunshan
●	●	Shentongjing	神童泾		33.51	Kunshan
●	|	Lujia	菉葭		34.85	Kunshan
●	●	Huaqiao Bolanzhongxin	花桥博览中心		37.16	Kunshan
●	●	Jishan	集善		38.65	Kunshan
●	|	Huaxigongyuan	花溪公园		39.97	Kunshan
●	●	Huaqiao	花桥	11	41.17	Kunshan

=== Through service ===
Through service between Line 3 and Line 11 started on December 23, 2023.
