= Taiping rolling stock depot =

Taiping rolling stock depot (simplified Chinese: 太平车辆段; traditional Chinese: 太平車輛段) is the rolling stock depot of Line 2, Suzhou Rail Transit with a total area of over 200 thousand square meters. It is located in Xiangcheng District, Suzhou.

Construction started in September 2011, and finished in December 2013 along with Line 2. This depot will also be combined with markets and apartments.
