= Qihe (disambiguation) =

Qihe may refer to:

- Qihe County (齐河县), a county in Shandong Province.
- Qihe, Taoyuan (漆河镇), a town in Taoyuan County, Shandong Province.
- Qihe Station (骑河站), Line 2, Rail Transit of Suzhou.
