= Yinshan Hu station =

Suzhou Metro station

Coordinates: 31°15′01″N 120°41′35″E

Yinshan Hu 尹山湖
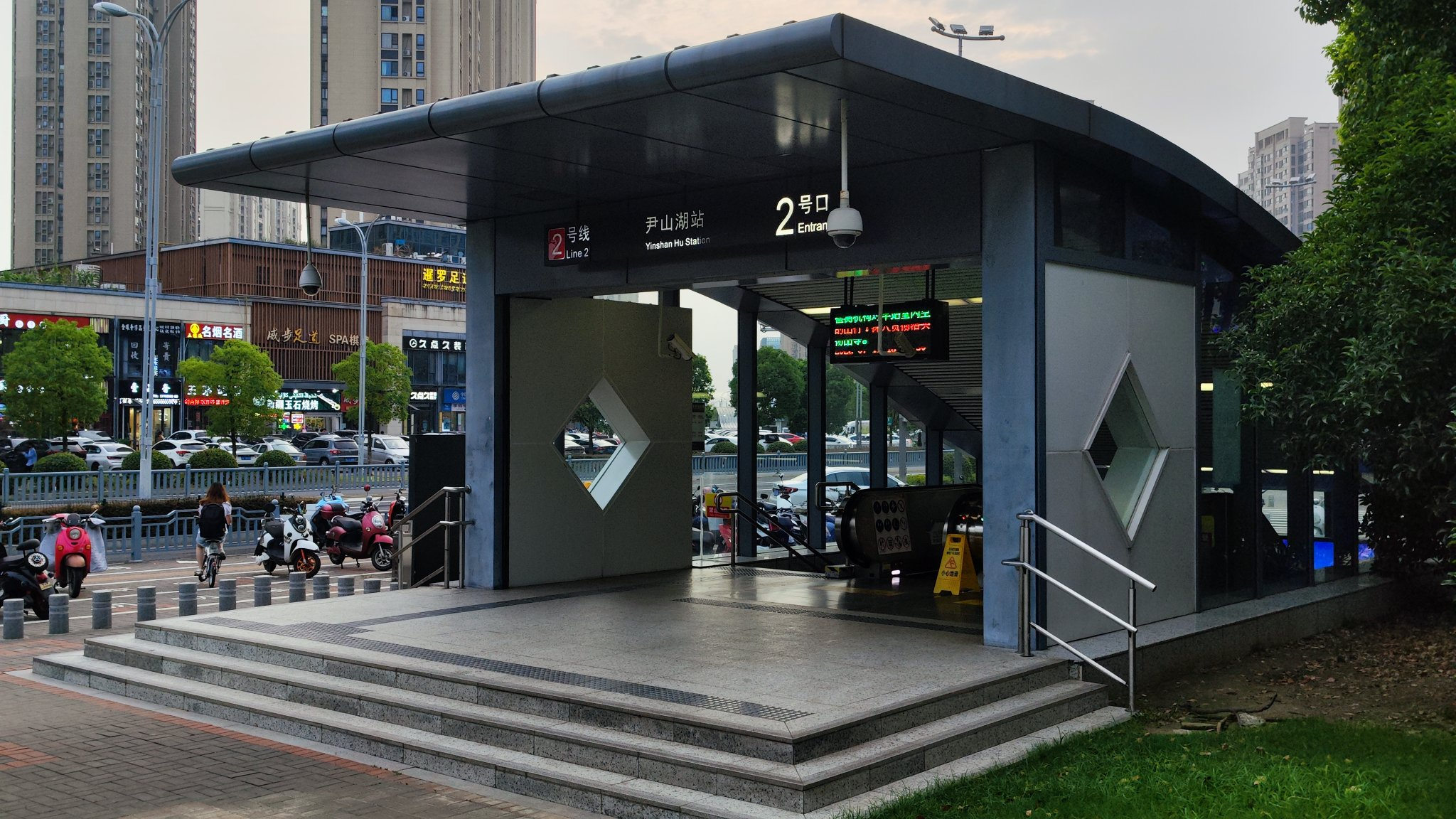

General information
- Other names: Yinshan Lake
- Location: Wuzhong District, Suzhou, Jiangsu; China
- Operated by: Suzhou Rail Transit Co., Ltd
- Line(s): Line 2
- Platforms: 2 (1 island platform)

Construction
- Structure type: Underground

History
- Opened: September 24, 2016

Services
Preceding station	Suzhou Rail Transit	Following station
Guoyuan Lu towards Qihe	Line 2	Dushuhu South towards Sangtiandao

Yinshan Hu Station (Chinese: 尹山湖; pinyin: Yǐnshān Hú; lit: "Yinshan Lake") is a station of Line 2 of the Suzhou Metro, located in Wuzhong District of Suzhou. It started operation on September 24, 2016, with the opening of the Baodaiqiao South - Sangtiandao extension on Line 2.

The station serves the Yinshan Lake area, a luxury urban area rapidly developing around the lake, which is actually a reservoir artificially constructed in 2004. The area has several dense population centers which rely on the station, including the Ministry of State Security's Jiangnan Social University.
