= Dushuhu Neighborhood Center station =

Suzhou Metro station

Coordinates: 31°15′19″N 120°43′07″E

Dushuhu Neighborhood Center 独墅湖邻里中心
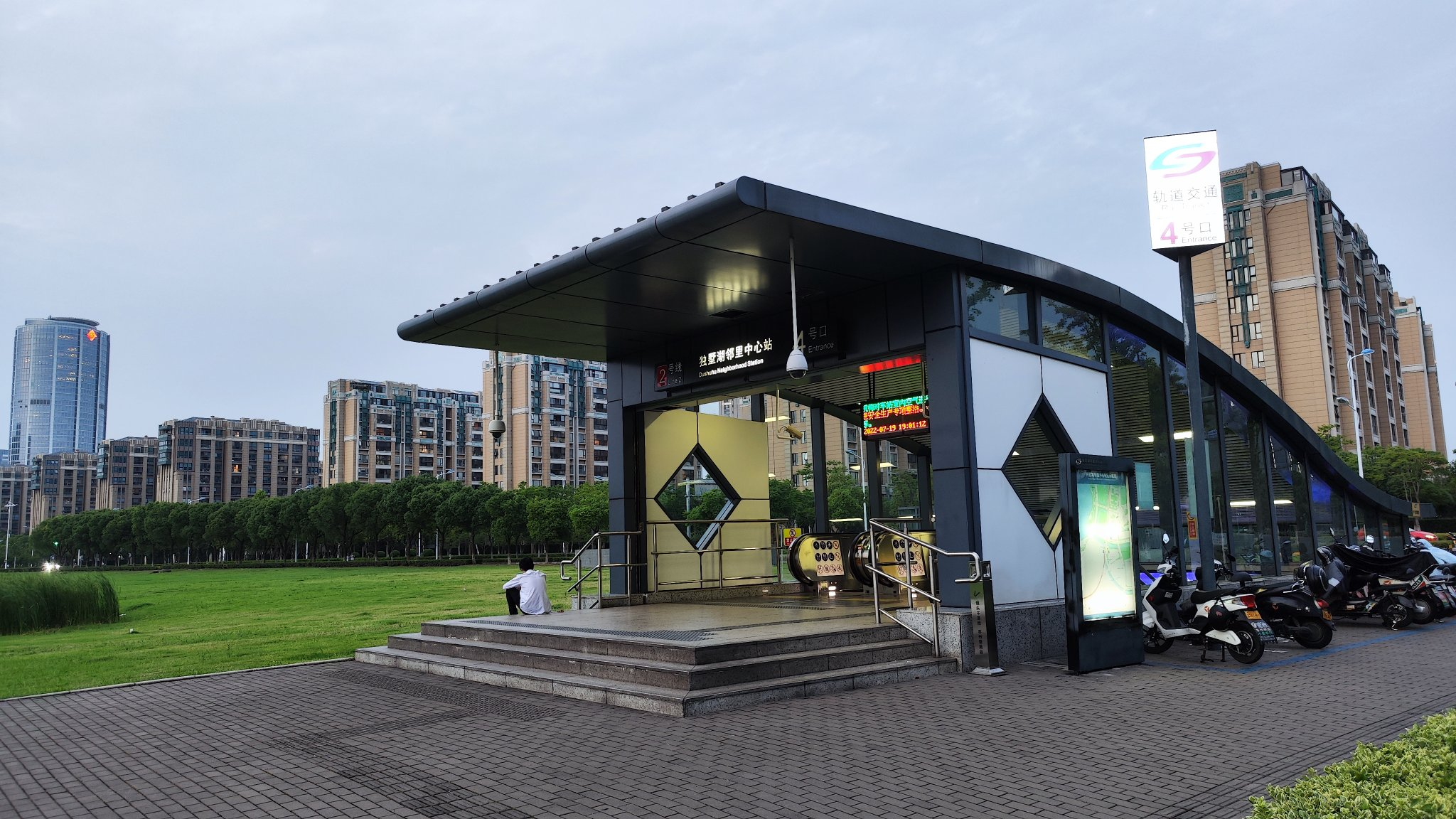

General information
- Other names: Dushuhu Linlizhongxin
- Location: Gusu District, Suzhou, Jiangsu; China
- Operated by: Suzhou Rail Transit Co., Ltd
- Line(s): Line 2
- Platforms: 2 (1 island platform)

Construction
- Structure type: Underground

History
- Opened: September 24, 2016

Services
| Preceding station | Suzhou Rail Transit | Following station |
|---|---|---|
| Dushuhu South towards Qihe | Line 2 | Moon Bay towards Sangtiandao |

Dushuhu Neighborhood Center Station (Chinese: 独墅湖邻里中心) is a station on Line 2 of the Suzhou Metro located in Gusu District of Suzhou. It started operation on September 24, 2016, with the opening of the Baodaiqiao South - Sangtiandao extension on Line 2.
