= Guoxiang station =

Suzhou Metro station

Coordinates: 31°15′04″N 120°40′09″E

Guoxiang 郭巷
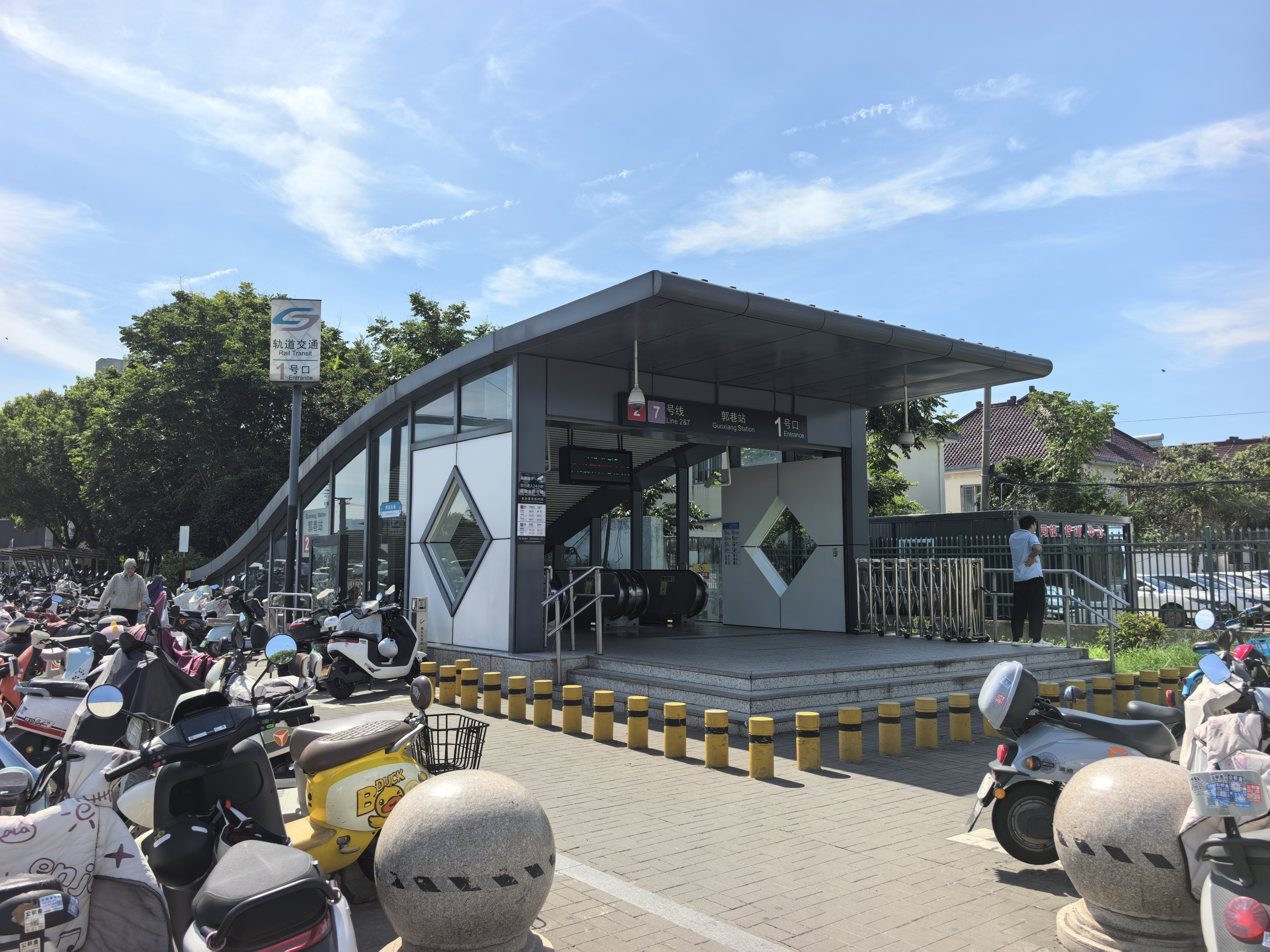

General information
- Location: Wuzhong District, Suzhou, Jiangsu; China
- Operated by: Suzhou Rail Transit Co., Ltd
- Lines: Line 2 Line 7
- Platforms: 2 (1 island platform)

Construction
- Structure type: Underground

History
- Opened: September 24, 2016

Services
Preceding station	Suzhou Metro	Following station
Yinzhong Lu towards Qihe	Line 2	Guoyuan Lu towards Sangtiandao
Linjiatan towards Changlou	Line 7	Yinshan towards Muli
Location

Guoxiang Station (Chinese: 郭巷) is a station on Line 2 of the Suzhou Metro located in Wuzhong District of Suzhou. Upon completion of Line 7, Guoxiang became one of two interchanges between the lines.

== History ==
It started operation on September 24, 2016, with the opening of the Baodaiqiao South - Sangtiandao extension on Line 2.
