= Line 10 (Suzhou Metro) =

Metro line in Suzhou, Jiangsu, China

- 10

Overview
- Other names: Line S2 (Planned name of Suyuzhang section); Line S4 (Planned name of Changshu - Zhangjiagang section); Line S5 (Formerly name); Line S7 (Wujiang section); Suyuzhang Line; Suzhou suburban railway Changshu - Zhangjiagang Line
- Status: Under Construction
- Owner: Suzhou Rail Transit Co., Ltd
- Termini: Jingang; Suzhoubei Railway Station (tentative)
- Stations: 21 (Suyuzhuang section); 10 (Suzhou city center section); 11 (Wujiang section); 42 (total)

Service
- Type: Rapid transit, Intercity rail
- System: Suzhou Metro
- Operator(s): Suzhou Rail Transit Co., Ltd

Technical
- Line length: 90.34 km (56.13 mi) (Suyuzhuang section); 18.5 km (11.5 mi) (Suzhou city center section); 53 km (33 mi) (Wujiang section); 160 km (99 mi) (Total)
- Track gauge: 1,435 mm (4 ft 8 1/2 in)
- Electrification: 25 kV AC 50 Hz Overhead catenary
- Operating speed: 160 km/h (99 mph) (Maximum design speed)

Line 10 of the Suzhou Metro (Chinese: 苏州轨道交通10号线) is an under construction north–south regional rapid transit line in Suzhou, Jiangsu, China. The Northern section of Line 10 is 90.34 km in length with 21 stations, including 13 elevated stations and 8 underground stations.. In the future, Line 10 will connect with Shanghai Metro Line 17. The line was formerly known as Suzhou Rail Transit Line S5.

Later sections of the line under planning will continue south through the city center of Suzhou to Wujiang District, Suzhou creating a north-south express regional rapid transit line.

The line is designed for trains to operate up to 160 km/h and have passing loop for Direct Express and Express services to operate.

As of 2026, the line had been discontinued.

== Stations ==
The line has a total of 21 stations spanning across Suzhou, Changshu & Zhangjiagang cities in Jiangsu.

The following are the 3 types of services provided along the line:

- L - Local services
- R - Rapid express services
- D - Direct express services

| L | R | D | Station name | | Connections | Structure | Location |
| L | R | D | English | Chinese | Connections | Structure | Location |
|---|---|---|---|---|---|---|---|
| ● | ● | ● | Jingang | 金港 | | Elevated | Zhangjiagang |
| ● | | | | | Houcheng | 后塍 | | Elevated | Zhangjiagang |
| ● | ● | | | Guotaizhonglu | 国泰中路 | | Underground | Zhangjiagang |
| ● | ● | ● | Yangshe | 杨舍 | | Underground | Zhangjiagang |
| ● | ● | ● | Huachanglu | 华昌路 | | Underground | Zhangjiagang |
| ● | ● | | | Jiangchenglu | 蒋乘路 | | Underground | Zhangjiagang |
| ● | | | | | Luyuan | 鹿苑 | | Elevated | Zhangjiagang |
| ● | ● | | | Zhangjiagang Railway Station | 张家港站 | | Underground | Zhangjiagang |
| ● | | | | | Haiyu | 海虞 | | Elevated | Changshu |
| ● | ● | | | Changshu Railway Station | 常熟站 | SS CAU | Underground | Changshu |
| ● | ● | ● | Changjianglu | 长江路 | | Elevated | Changshu |
| ● | ● | | | Exhibition Center | 会展中心 | | Elevated | Changshu |
| ● | ● | ● | Huaxi | 花溪 | 20 | Elevated | Changshu |
| ● | ● | ● | Zhaoshangbeilu | 招商北路 | | Underground | Changshu |
| ● | ● | | | Kunchenghu West | 昆承湖西 | | Elevated | Changshu |
| ● | | | | | Xinzhuang | 辛庄 | | Elevated | Changshu |
| ● | ● | | | Gaotiebeicheng | 高铁北城 | | Elevated | Changshu |
| ● | ● | ● | Zhengzhuhulu | 珍珠湖路 | | Elevated | Xiangcheng District, Suzhou |
| ● | ● | | | Taidonglu | 太东路 | | Elevated | Xiangcheng District, Suzhou |
| ● | ● | ● | International Exhibition Center | 国际会展中心 | | Elevated | Xiangcheng District, Suzhou |
| ● | ● | ● | Suzhoubei Railway Station | 高铁苏州北站 | 2 7 JH OHH | Underground | Xiangcheng District, Suzhou |

== History ==
Construction of the Northern section, known as the Suyuzhang section, started on January 2, 2023 with total investment of 39.15 biliion RMB. It is expected to open in 2028. The length of this section is 90.34 kilometers.

In November 2023, the Changshu section entered construction.

It runs through Zhangjiagang North Railway Station, Zhangjiagang Coach Station, Zhangjiagang Railway Station, Tangqiao, Fenghuang, Shanghu, to urban Suzhou at Suzhou North Railway Station and connects the Suzhou city to county-level cities of Zhangjiagang and Changshu, which are under the administration of Suzhou.
