= Jiangnan Social University =

Chinese spy school

- 江南社会学院 (Chinese)
- Type: National
- Established: 1984; 42 years ago
- Parent institution: Ministry of State Security
- Chairman: Huang Jinyong
- President: Chen Donghao
- Location: No. 3 Yinshan Lake, Guoxiang, Wuzhong District, Suzhou, Jiangsu, China; 31°13′57″N 120°41′0″E
- Transportation: Train: 2 Yinshan Hu

Chinese name
- Simplified Chinese: 江南社会学院
- Traditional Chinese: 江南社會學院
Transcriptions
Standard Mandarin
- Hanyu Pinyin: Jiāngnán Shèhuì Xuéyuàn

Jiangnan Social University (Chinese: 江南社会学院) is school of intelligence tradecraft operated by the Ministry of State Security (MSS) of the People's Republic of China. Located on Yinshan Lake in Suzhou, Jiangsu, an hour's drive from Shanghai, the school is also known as the University of International Relations Suzhou Campus and the Ministry of State Security Administrative Institute.

== Academics ==
The university is located in Suzhou, Jiangsu province, and was established in 1984 or 1986 with around 600 students and staff.

Originally intended to be an annex of the University of International Relations in Beijing, the school instead reportedly teaches courses in intelligence tradecraft, such as firearms, martial arts, driving, communications, and surveillance skills to MSS cadres in courses lasting up to a year. More recently, Alex Joske's 2022 book, Spies and Lies, describes the compound as an older, mid-career MSS training institution with "none of the grandeur" of newer MSS facilities.

Satellite imagery appears to show a shooting range at the southern end of the campus.

== Journal ==
Journal of Jiangnan Social University
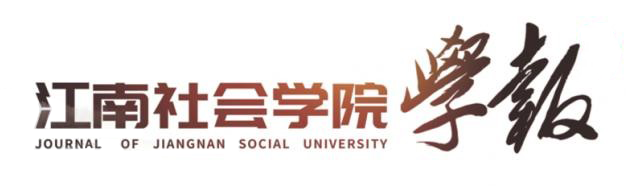
- Discipline: National security Communist ideology
- Language: Chinese
- Edited by: Tai Yaochang

Publication details
- History: 1999–present
- Publisher: Jiangnan Social University (China)
- Frequency: Quarterly

Standard abbreviations
- ISO 4: J. Jiangnan Soc. Univ.

Indexing
- ISSN: 1673-1026

Links
- Catalog archive at CNKI

Since 1999, the school has published the Journal of Jiangnan Social University (Chinese: 江南社会学院学报; pinyin: Jiāngnán Shèhuì Xuéyuàn Xuébào), featuring articles primarily on the topics of national security, Chinese communist ideology, and international relations, as well as incorporating discussions on the exploitation of emerging technologies, social control, ethnic religion, and critical theory.

Submissions are open to all Chinese Communist Party and government agency employees at all levels, students and faculty of administrative colleges, party schools, colleges and universities, and social science research institutions, as well as authors affiliated directly with Jiangnan Social University. The journal solicits outside submissions via periodic calls for papers similar to ordinary academic institutions.

The journal's quarterly issues are unclassified and available to the public, albeit behind a paywall, through CNKI. All articles are in Chinese with abstracts in Chinese and English. The journal's digital object identifier (DOI) prefix is 10.16147 and its ISSN is 1673-1026.

== Sanctions ==
- Canada has placed export controls on Jiangnan Social University as a Named Research Organization under the Policy on Sensitive Technology Research and Affiliations of Concern, prohibiting Canadian government funded organizations from engaging with the institution.
