= Youlian station =

Suzhou Metro station

Coordinates: 31°16′25″N 120°36′17″E

Youlian 友联

General information
- Location: Wuzhong District, Suzhou, Jiangsu; China
- Operated by: Suzhou Rail Transit Co., Ltd
- Line(s): Line 2
- Platforms: 2 (1 island platform)

Construction
- Structure type: Underground

History
- Opened: December 28, 2013

Services
Preceding station	Suzhou Metro	Following station
Tongjing Park towards Qihe	Line 2	Panli Lu towards Sangtiandao

Youlian Station (Chinese: 友联站) is a station on Line 2 of the Suzhou Metro. The station is located in Wuzhong District of Suzhou. It started service on December 28, 2013, when Line 2 first opened.
