= Suzhoubei Railway Station metro station =

Metro station in Suzhou, China

Suzhoubei Railway Station 高铁苏州北站
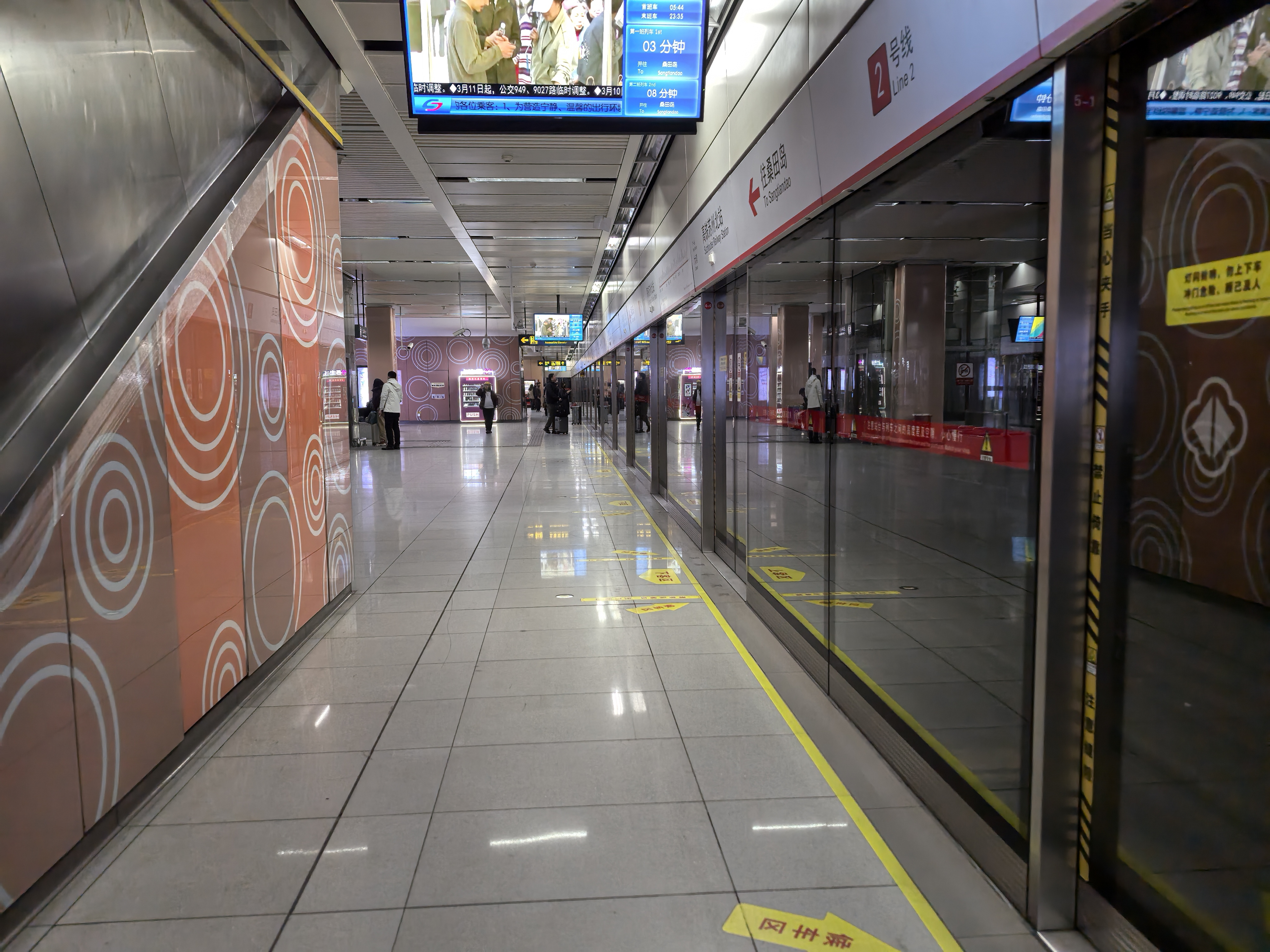
- Platform

General information
- Location: Suzhou North railway station Xiangcheng District, Suzhou, Jiangsu; China
- Coordinates: 31°25′25″N 120°38′26″E
- System: Suzhou Metro
- Operated by: Suzhou Rail Transit Co., Ltd
- Line: Line 2
- Platforms: 2 (1 island platform)
- Connections: Suzhou North

Construction
- Structure type: Underground
- Accessible: Yes

History
- Opened: December 28, 2013
- Previous names: Suzhou North Railway Station

Services
Preceding station	Suzhou Metro	Following station
Fuxianglu towards Qihe	Line 2	Dawan towards Sangtiandao
Location

Suzhoubei Railway Station (simplified Chinese: 高铁苏州北站; traditional Chinese: 高鐵蘇州北站), formerly known as Suzhou North Railway Station, is a station on Line 2 of the Suzhou Metro. The station is located in Xiangcheng District of Suzhou. It started service on December 28, 2013 with the opening of Line 2 and serves Suzhou North Railway Station.

== Bus connections ==
This station is connected to Suzhou North Railway Station bus stop, which is served by bus routes 8, 77, 80, 139, 711, 811, 819 and 866.
