= Sanxiang Square station =

Metro station in Suzhou, China

Coordinates: 31°18′00″N 120°35′38″E

Sanxiang Square 三香广场
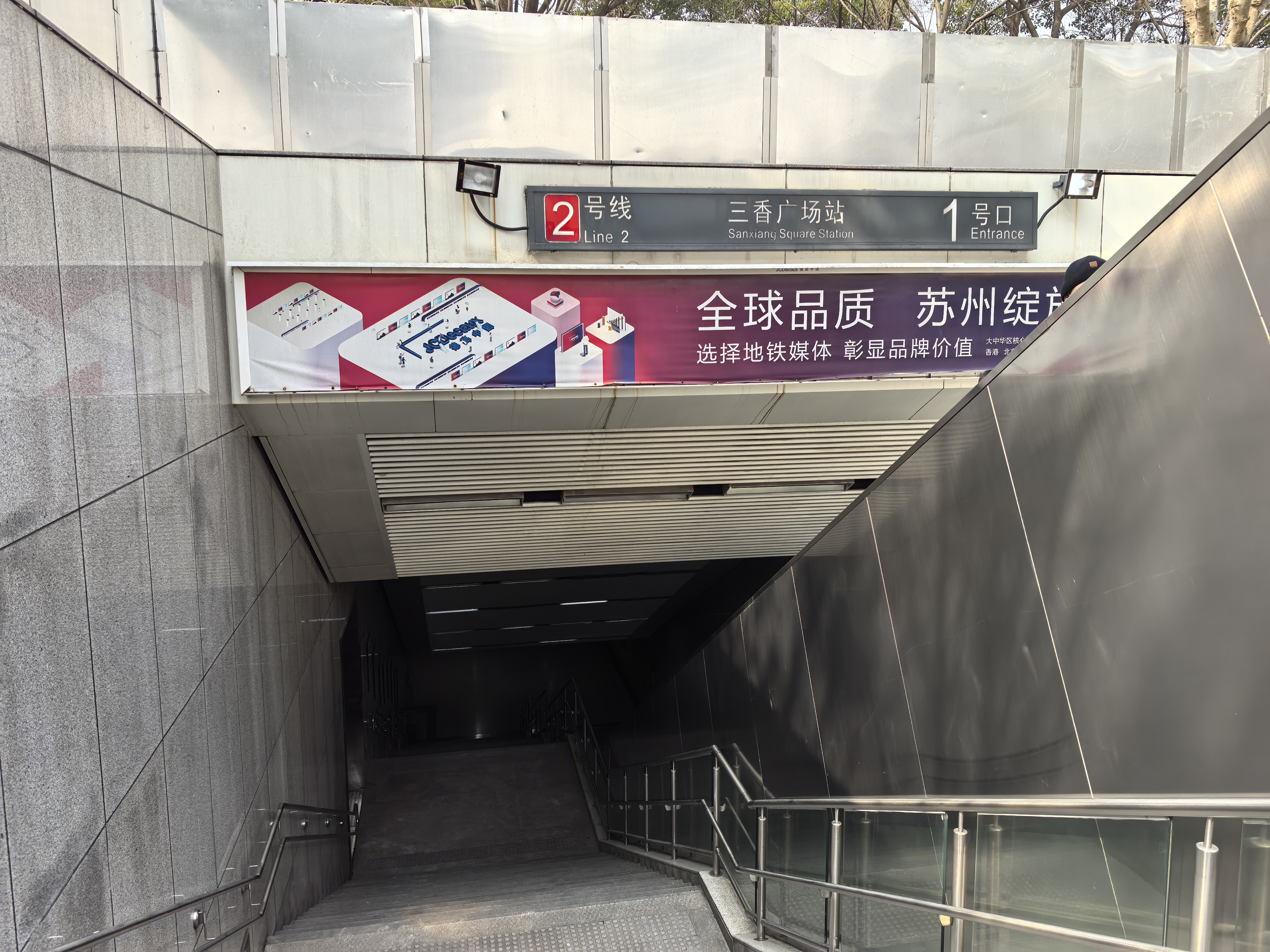
- Exit 1

General information
- Location: Gusu District, Suzhou, Jiangsu; China
- Operated by: Suzhou Rail Transit Co., Ltd
- Line: Line 2
- Platforms: 2 (1 island platform)

Construction
- Structure type: Underground

History
- Opened: December 28, 2013

Services
Preceding station	Suzhou Metro	Following station
Guangji Nanlu towards Qihe	Line 2	Laodonglu towards Sangtiandao
Location

Sanxiang Square Station (Chinese: 三香广场站) is a station on Line 2 of the Suzhou Metro. The station is located in Gusu District of Suzhou. It started service on December 28, 2013, when Line 2 first opened.
