= Xinjia Qiao station =

Suzhou Metro station

Coordinates: 31°15′31″N 120°36′38″E

Xinjiaqiao 新家桥
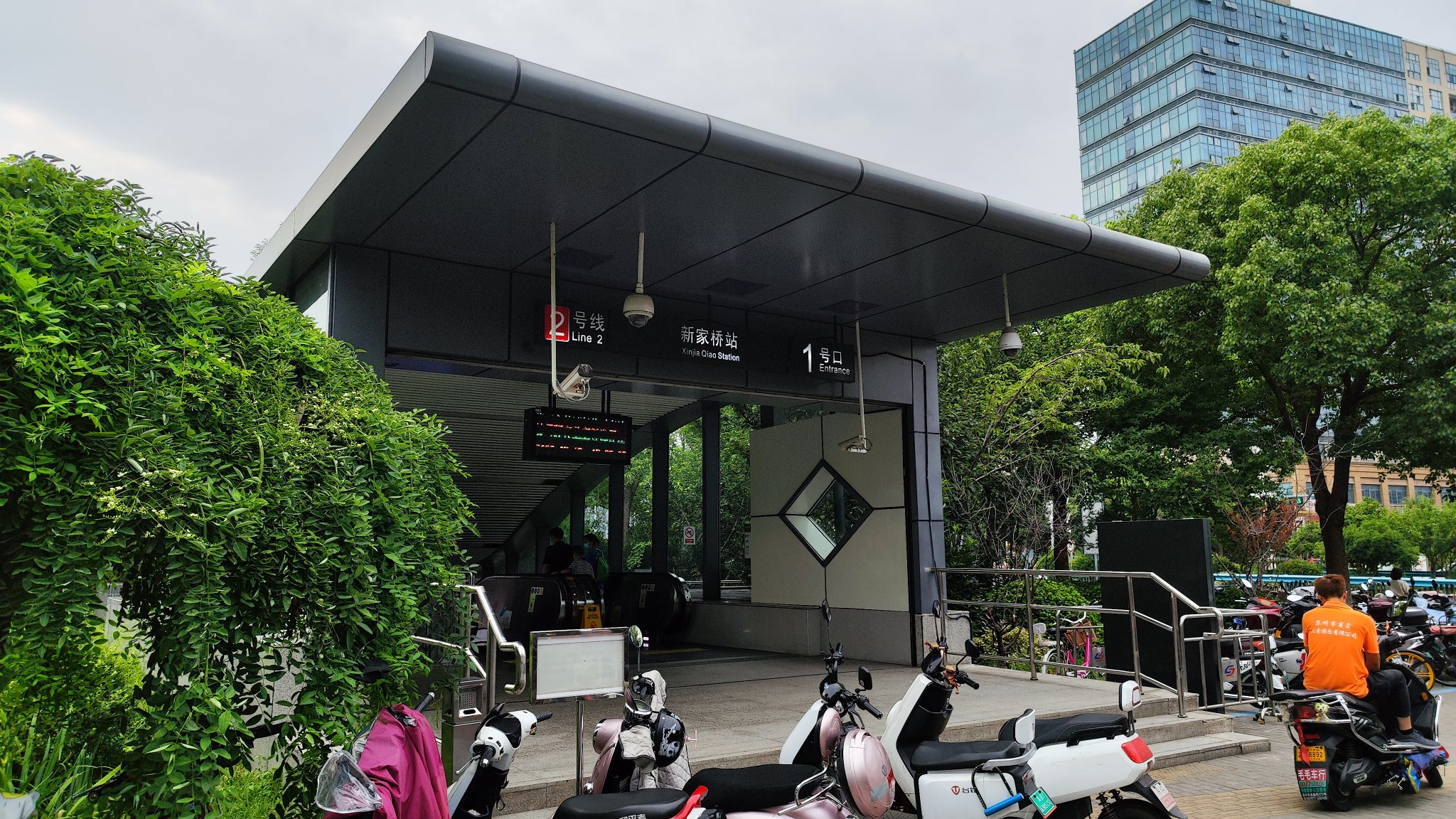

General information
- Location: Wuzhong District, Suzhou, Jiangsu; China
- Operated by: Suzhou Rail Transit Co., Ltd
- Line(s): Line 2
- Platforms: 2 (1 island platform)

Construction
- Structure type: Underground

History
- Opened: December 28, 2013

Services
Preceding station	Suzhou Metro	Following station
Panli Lu towards Qihe	Line 2	Shihu Donglu towards Sangtiandao

Xinjia Qiao Station (Chinese: 新家桥站) is a station on Line 2 of the Suzhou Metro. The station is located in Wuzhong District of Suzhou. It started service on December 28, 2013, when Line 2 first opened.
