= Fuxianglu station =

Metro station in Suzhou, China

Fuxianglu 富翔路
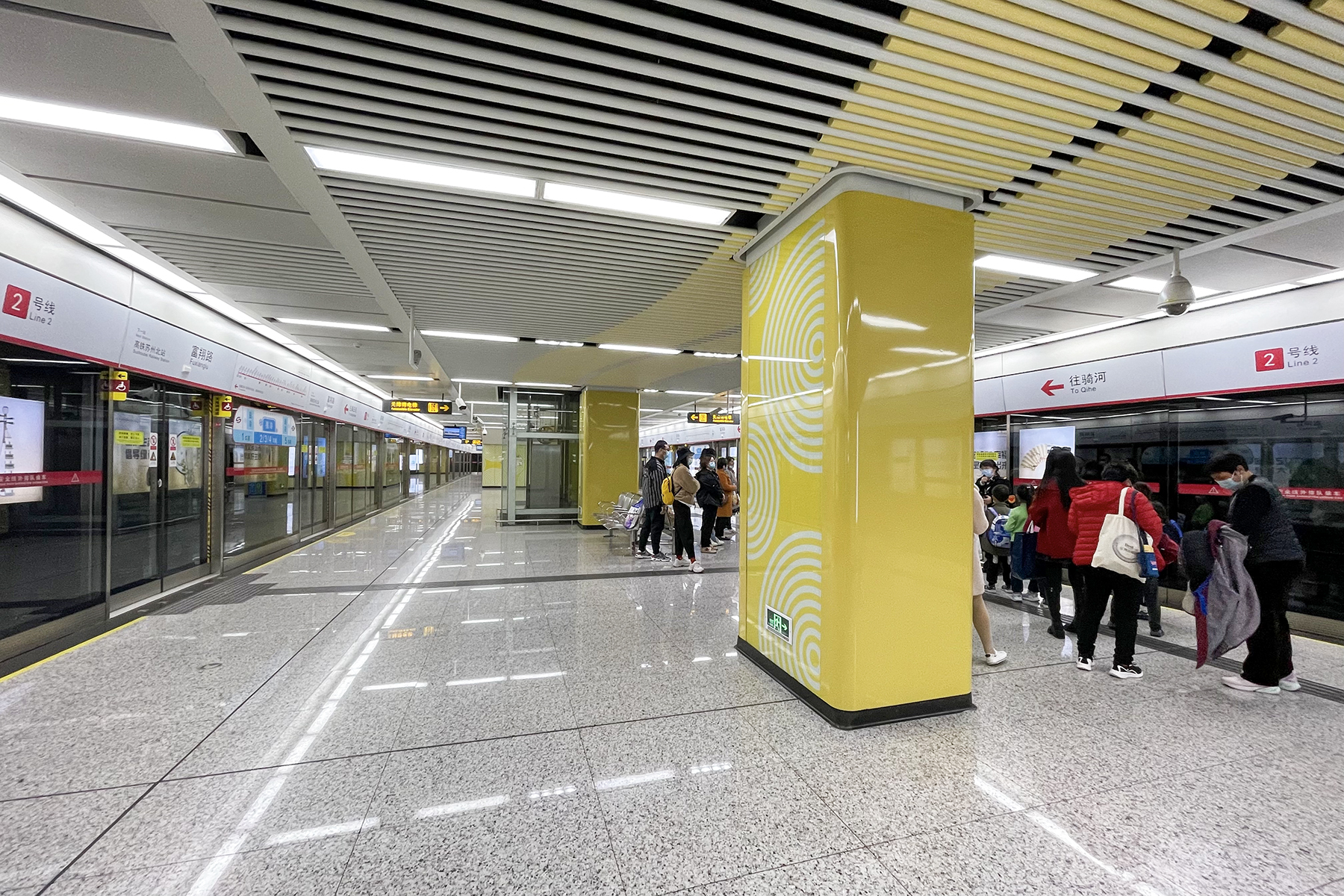
- Platform

General information
- Location: Xiangrong Lu (相融路) × Fuxiang Lu (富翔路); Xiangcheng District, Suzhou, Jiangsu; China
- Coordinates: 31°25′56″N 120°38′49″E
- Operated by: Suzhou Rail Transit Co., Ltd
- Line: Line 2
- Platforms: 2 (1 island platform)

Construction
- Structure type: Underground
- Accessible: Yes

History
- Opened: September 24, 2016
- Previous names: Fuxiang Lu

Services
Preceding station	Suzhou Metro	Following station
Qihe Terminus	Line 2	Suzhou North Railway Station towards Sangtiandao
Location

Fuxianglu (Chinese: 富翔路), formerly known as Fuxiang Lu, is a station on Line 2 of the Suzhou Metro. The station is located in Xiangcheng District of Suzhou. It started service in September 24, 2016, when Line 2 extension started service.
