= Tongjing Park station =

Suzhou Metro station

Coordinates: 31°16′52″N 120°35′45″E

Tongjing Park 桐泾公园
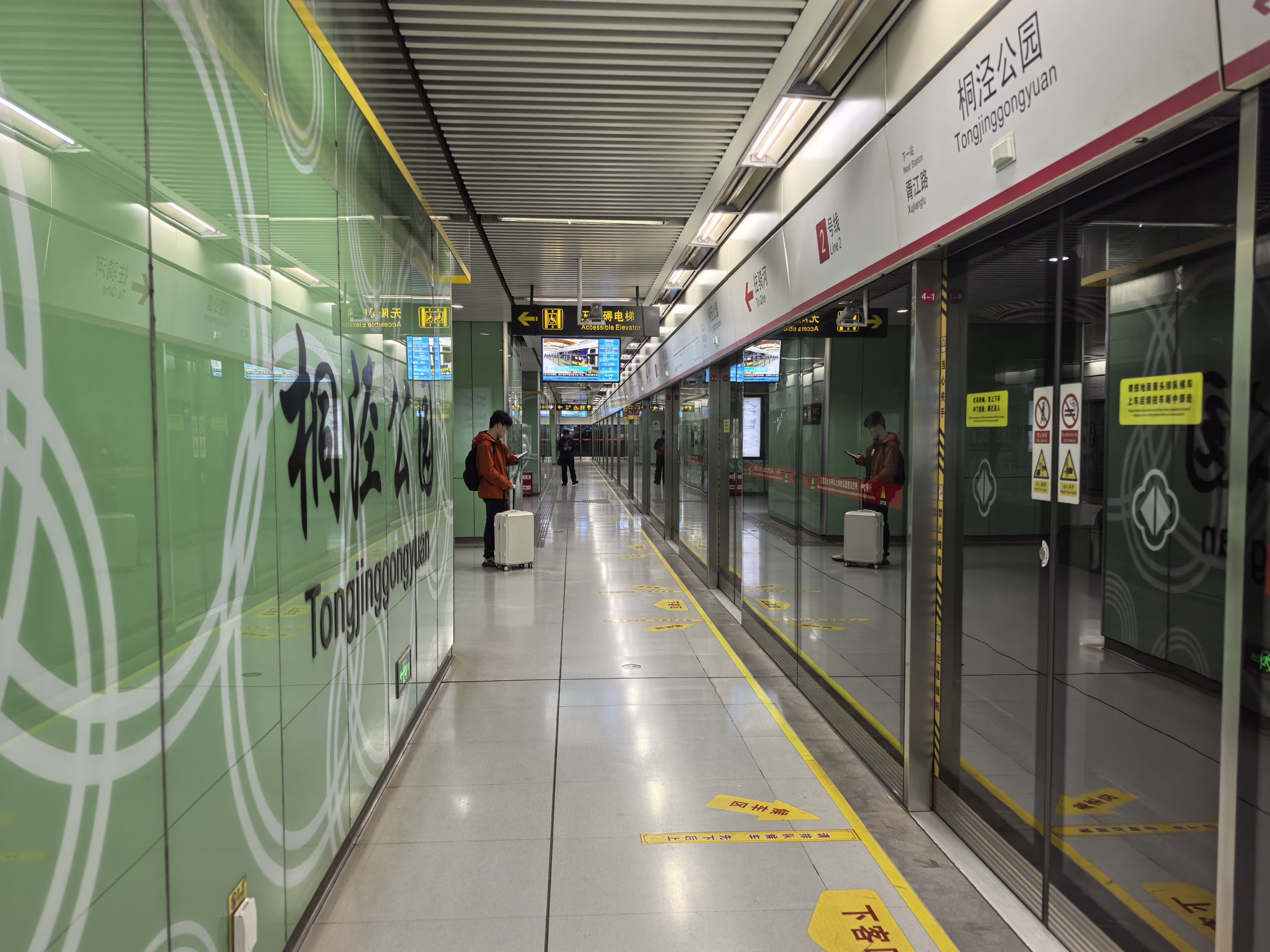

General information
- Location: Gusu District, Suzhou, Jiangsu; China
- Operated by: Suzhou Rail Transit Co., Ltd
- Line: Line 2
- Platforms: 2 (1 island platform)

Construction
- Structure type: Underground

History
- Opened: December 28, 2013

Services
Preceding station	Suzhou Metro	Following station
Xujiang Lu towards Qihe	Line 2	Youlian towards Sangtiandao
Location

Tongjing Park Station (Chinese: 桐泾公园站) is a station on Line 2 of the Suzhou Metro. The station is located in the Gusu District of Suzhou. It started service on December 28, 2013, when Line 2 first opened.
