= Suzhou North railway station =

Railway station in Suzhou, China

Suzhoubei 苏州北
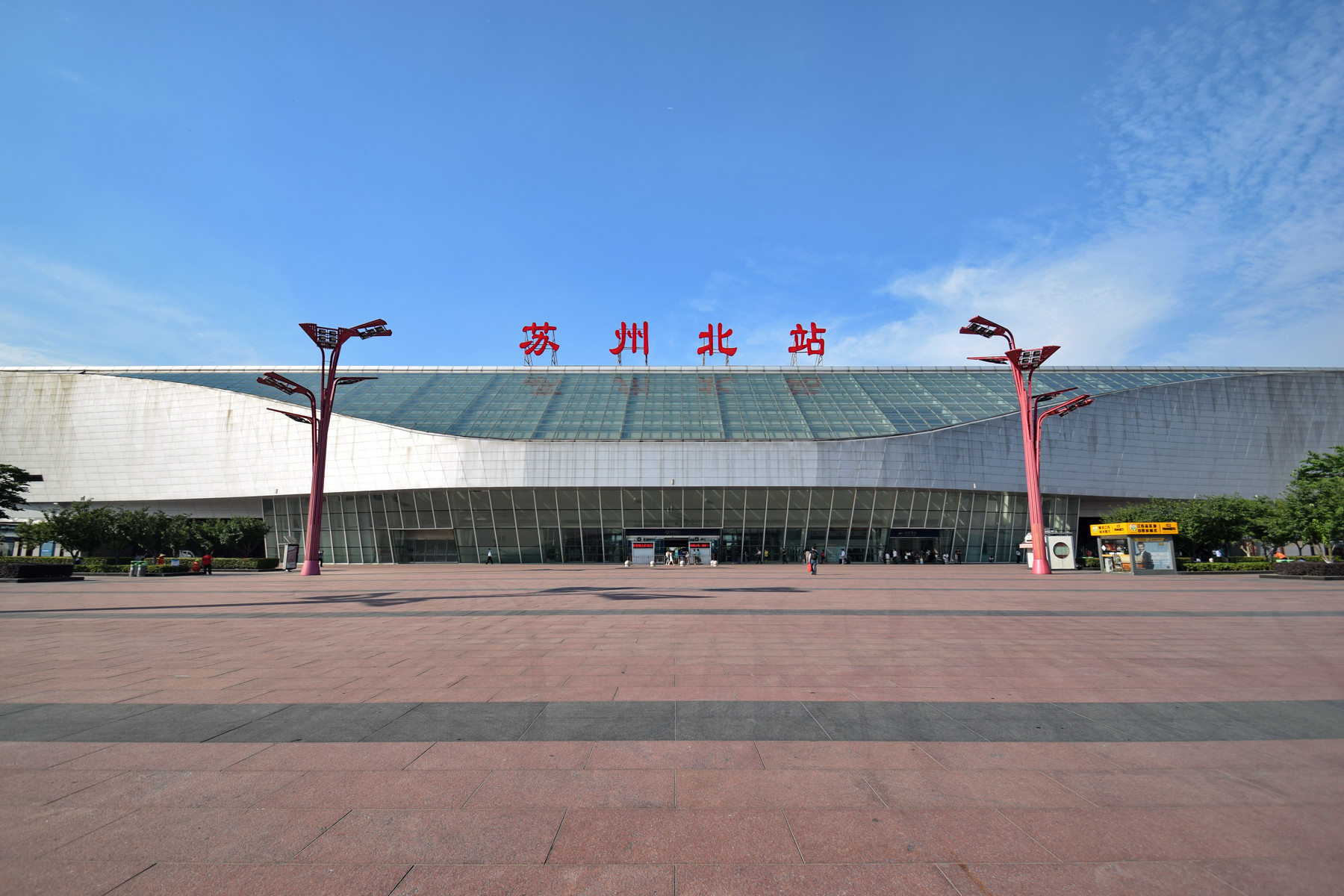
- Suzhou North railway station

General information
- Other names: Suzhou North
- Location: North Side of Zhujing Village, Xiangcheng District, Suzhou, Jiangsu; China
- Coordinates: 31.423646°N 120.639045°E
- Operated by: Shanghai Railway Bureau; China Railway Corporation
- Lines: Beijing–Shanghai High-Speed Railway; Nantong–Ningbo high-speed railway (planned)
- Connections: Metro station (Line 2)

Construction
- Structure type: Elevated
- Accessible: Yes

Other information
- Station code: TMIS code: 66854; Telegraph code: OHH; Pinyin code: SZB
- Classification: 1st class station

History
- Opened: June 30, 2010
Location

The Suzhou North railway station (Chinese: 苏州北站) is a high-speed railway station in Suzhou, Jiangsu, People's Republic of China. It is served by the Beijing–Shanghai High-Speed Railway. It is 10.5 kilometers away from Suzhou railway station.

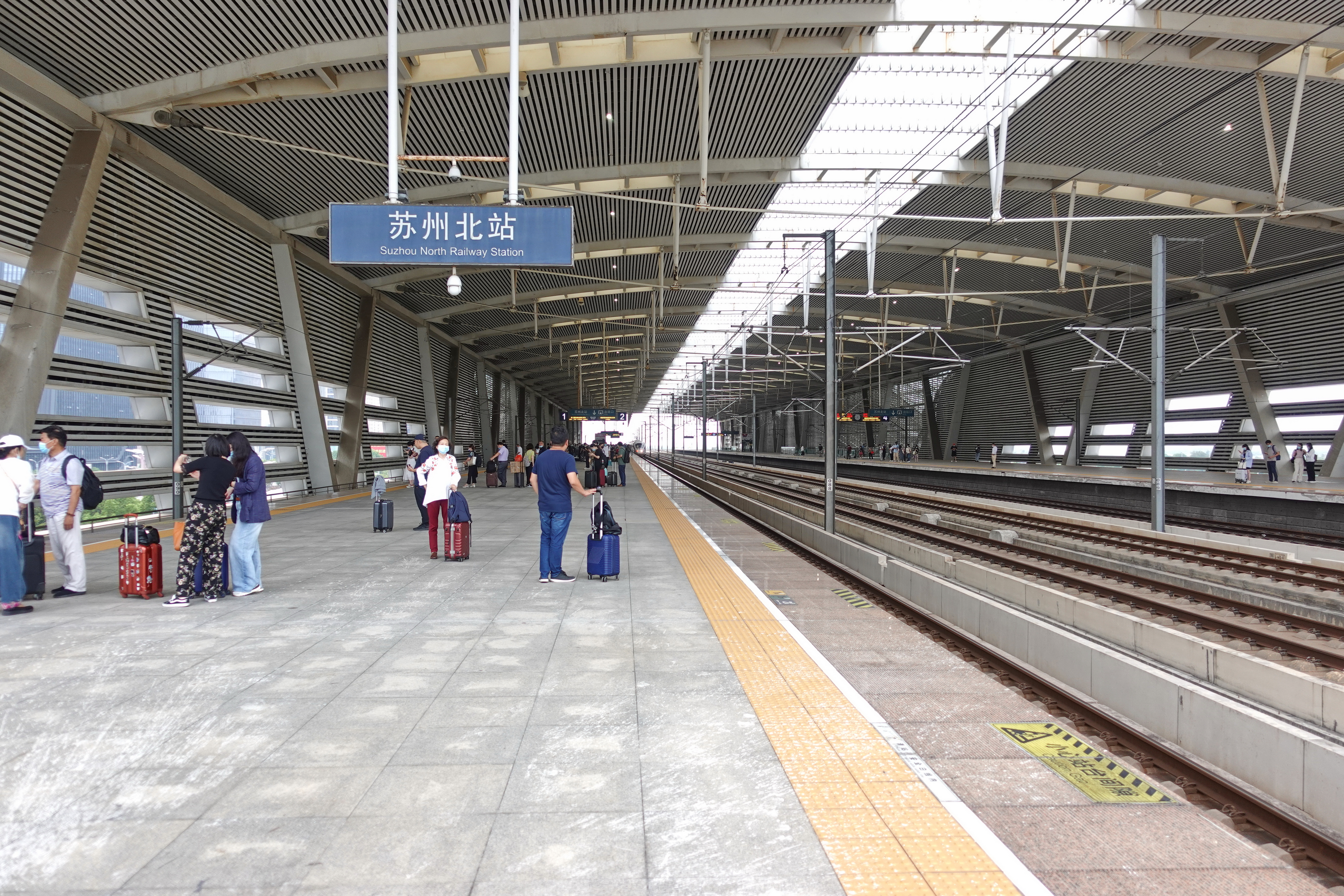
Platform

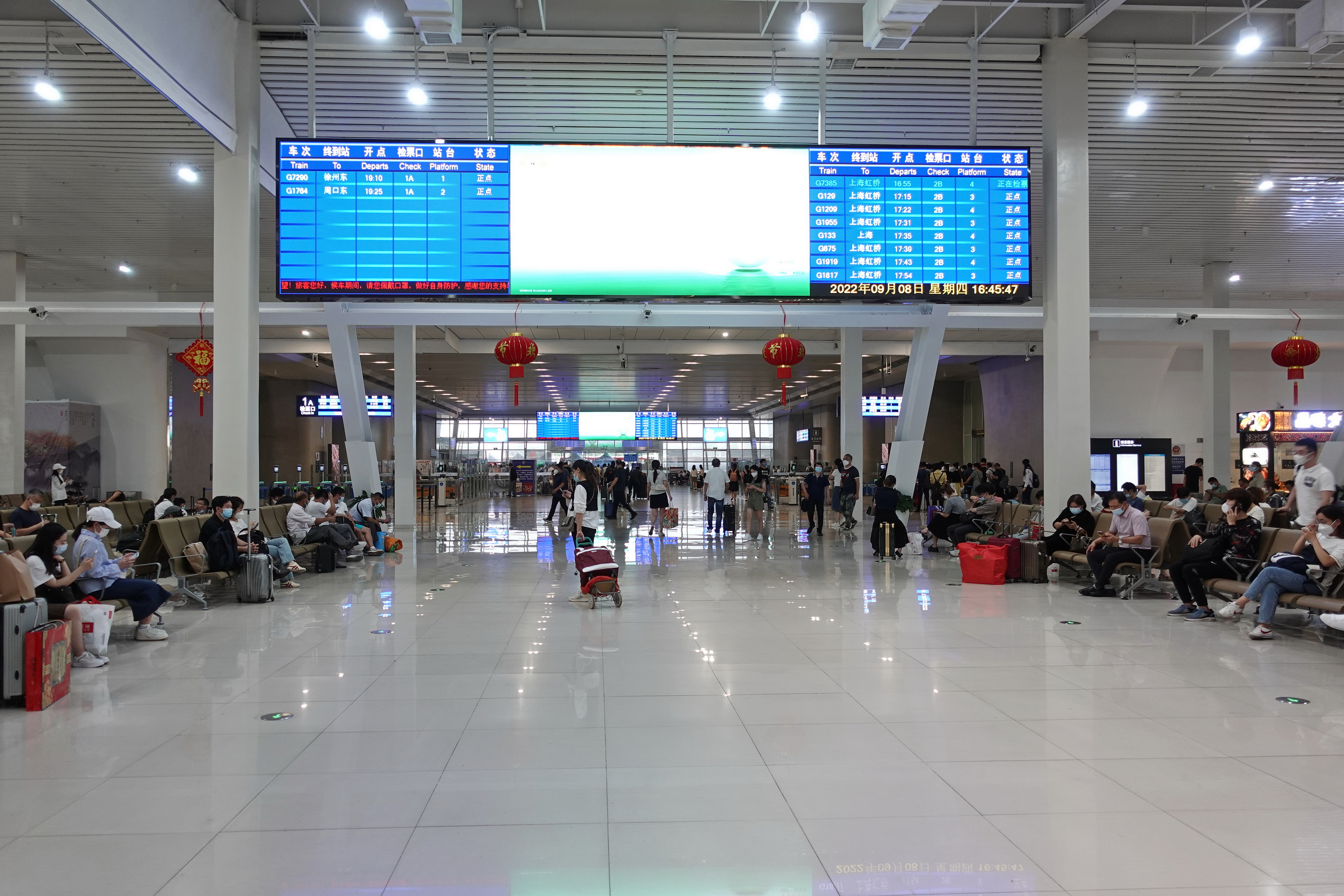
Concourse

== See also ==
- Suzhou railway station

Preceding station	China Railway High-speed	Following station
Wuxi East towards Beijing South or Tianjin West	Beijing–Shanghai high-speed railway Part of the Shanghai–Wuhan–Chengdu passenger-dedicated railway	Kunshan South towards Shanghai Hongqiao
