= Line 9 (Suzhou Metro) =

Proposed railway line in Suzhou, Jiangsu, China

- 9

Overview
- Status: Planned
- Owner: Suzhou Rail Transit Co., Ltd
- Stations: Unknown

Service
- Type: Rapid transit
- System: Suzhou Metro
- Operator(s): Suzhou Rail Transit Co., Ltd

Technical
- Line length: 52km
- Track gauge: 1,435 mm (4 ft 8 1/2 in)

Line 9 of the Suzhou Metro (Chinese: 苏州轨道交通9号线), also known as the East-West Express Line (Chinese: 东西向快线) is a planned east–west rapid transit line in Suzhou. No official public construction date is available, however construction is expected to start before 2035. It will serve Suzhou New District, Gusu District, Suzhou Industrial Park, Kunshan, and Taicang.

Line 9 is planned as the East-West Express Line. Due to the lack of capacity on Line 1, Line 9 is to make up for rapid transit linking Suzhou New District, Gusu District, and Suzhou Industrial Park to Kunshan and Taicang.
