= Precious Belt Bridge =

Precious Belt Bridge 宝带桥
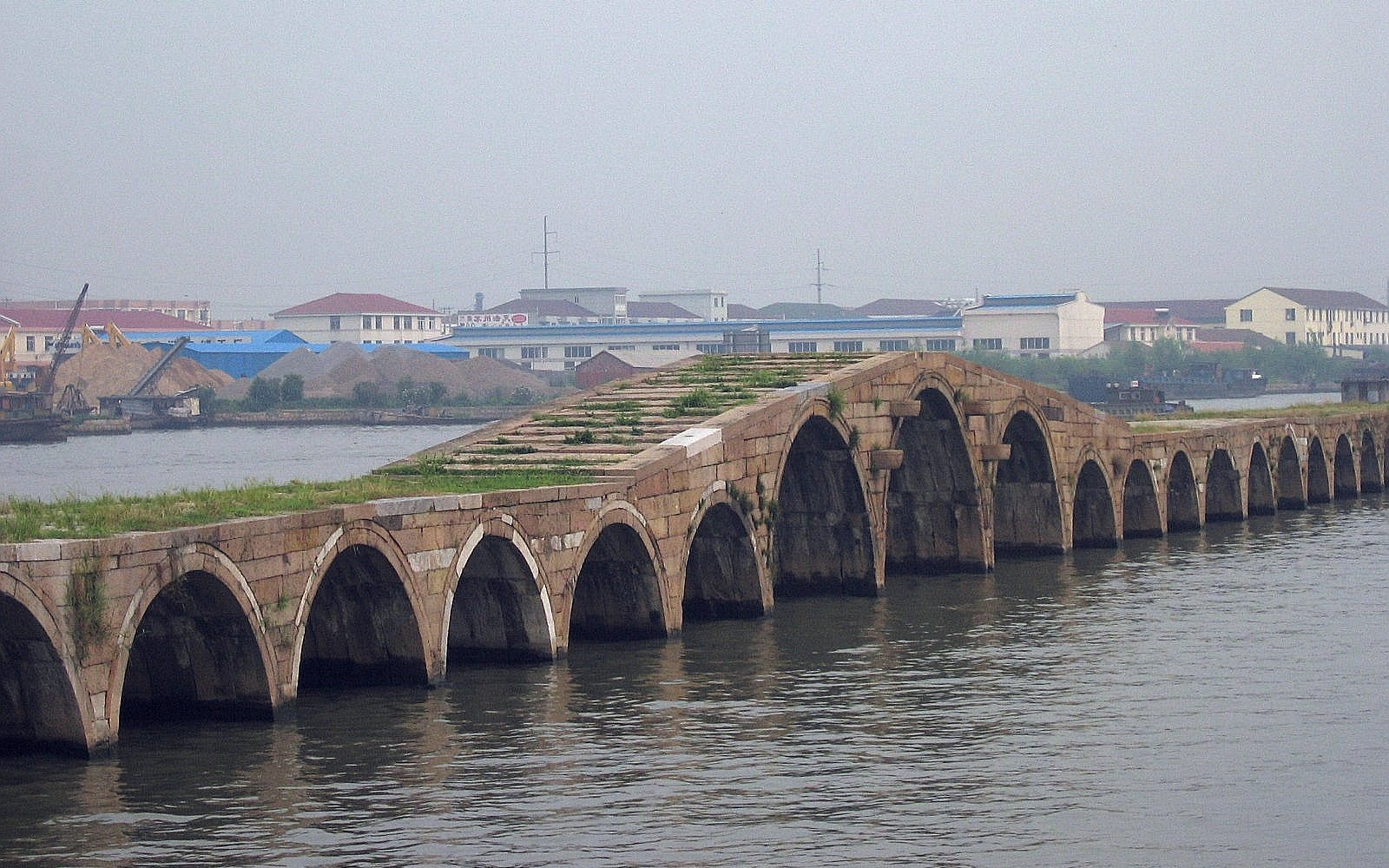
- Precious Belt Bridge
- Coordinates: 31°15′32″N 120°38′58.3″E
- Crosses: Grand Canal and Tantai Lake
- Locale: Suzhou, Jiangsu, China

Characteristics
- Material: Stone
- Total length: 317 m (1,040 ft)
- Width: 4.1 m (13 ft)

Precious Belt Bridge
- Traditional Chinese: 寶帶橋
- Simplified Chinese: 宝带桥
- Literal meaning: Precious Belt Bridge
Transcriptions
Standard Mandarin
- Hanyu Pinyin: Bǎodài Qiáo
- Wade–Giles: Pao-tai Ch'iao

The Precious Belt Bridge, also known by other names, is a stone arch bridge near Suzhou in Jiangsu, China. It is located at the intersection of the Grand Canal and Tantai Lake about 6 kilometers (3.7 mi) southeast of central Suzhou.

== Names ==
The names Precious Belt Bridge and Bridge of the Bejeweled Belt are calques of the bridge's Chinese name, written 寶帶橋 in traditional characters and 宝带桥 in simplified ones. It is also sometimes known as the Baodai Bridge from the pinyin romanization of the Mandarin pronunciation of the Chinese name. The name references the story that Wang Zhongshu, the prefect of Suzhou, funded its construction with his own lavishly decorated belt rather than through forced labor or additional taxation.

In Chinese, it is also known as the "Small Long Bridge".

== History ==
The Precious Belt Bridge was first built in AD 816 under the Tang dynasty. It is located about 6 kilometers (3.7 mi) from the Fengmen Gate in Suzhou's old city walls. The bridge was reconstructed several times, with the current bridge principally dating to the 1446 reconstruction under the reign of the Zhengtong Emperor of the Ming as repaired in 1873 under the Tongzhi Emperor of the Qing.

During the 1793 British Macartney Embassy, John Barrow visited the Precious Belt Bridge, accurately describing its length and the manner in which its central arches are higher than the others.

The bridge was inscribed as the 285th Major Cultural Heritage Site under National-Level Protection added during the 5th round of nominations in 2001.

== Structure ==
The bridge is constructed entirely of stone. It has a span of 317 m (1,040 ft) with 53 arches along its length. It is usually 4.1 m (13 ft) wide. The three central arches are enlarged to allow for the passage of—by historical standards—larger river vessels without masts. The average span of each arch is 4.6 m (15 ft).

Although the bridge was originally protected by pairs of foo dogs at each end, today only a single stone lion remains at the north entrance. The stone tower and stela pavilion originally located at the north end of the bridge have similarly vanished.

== See also ==
- Jade Belt Bridge
- List of bridges in China
- List of Major National Historical and Cultural Sites in Jiangsu
