= Line 2 (Suzhou Metro) =

Railway line in Suzhou, Jiangsu, China

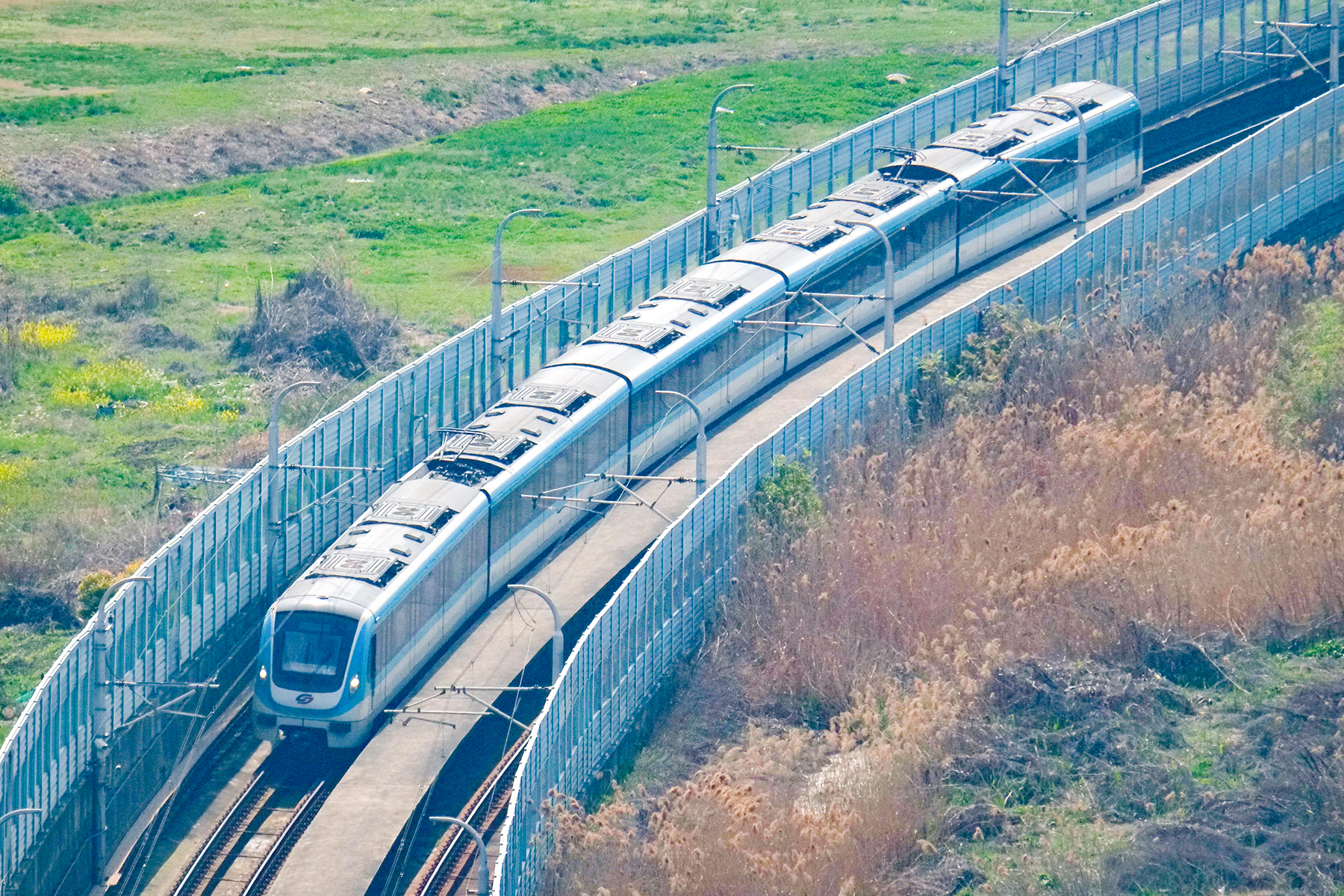
- A train of Suzhou Metro Line 2

Overview
- Status: In operation
- Owner: Suzhou Rail Transit Co., Ltd
- Termini: Qihe; Sangtiandao
- Stations: total 35 stations first phase: 22 stations (6 Elevated Stations, 16 Underground Stations) second phase: 13 stations

Service
- Type: Rapid transit
- System: Suzhou Metro
- Operator(s): Suzhou Rail Transit Co., Ltd

History
- Opened: December 28, 2013; 11 years ago

Technical
- Line length: 40.4 km (25.1 mi)
- Number of tracks: 2
- Character: Elevated and Underground
- Track gauge: 1,435 mm (4 ft 8 1/2 in)
- Electrification: overhead wire

Line 2 is a north-south line of the Suzhou Metro. It passes through five districts of Suzhou, and has 22 stations, 17 underground and 5 elevated. It began operations on December 28, 2013.

== History ==
The line was opened in two phases, with the 26.557 km (16.502 mi) long first phase from Suzhoubei Railway Station to Baodaiqiao South (宝带桥南) near Baodai Bridge started operations on December 28, 2013. This section consisted of 6.57 km (4.08 mi) of elevated track and 19.146 kilometres (11.897 mi) of underground track.

The 14.347 km (8.915 mi) second phase, running from Qihe to Fuxiang Lu in the north, and from Yinzhong Lu (尹中路) to Sangtiandao (桑田岛) in the east, commenced trial operations on September 24, 2016.

A north extension to Aigehao Road is under construction, and it's expected to open in 2026.

=== Opening timeline ===
Segment	Commencement	Length	Station(s)	Name
Suzhou North Railway Station — Baodaiqiao South	28 December 2013	26.557 km (16.50 mi)	22	Phase 1
Qihe — Suzhou North Railway Station	24 September 2016	2.2 km (1.37 mi)	2	Phase 2
Baodaiqiao South — Sangtiandao	24 September 2016	11.643 km (7.23 mi)	11	Phase 2

== Stations ==
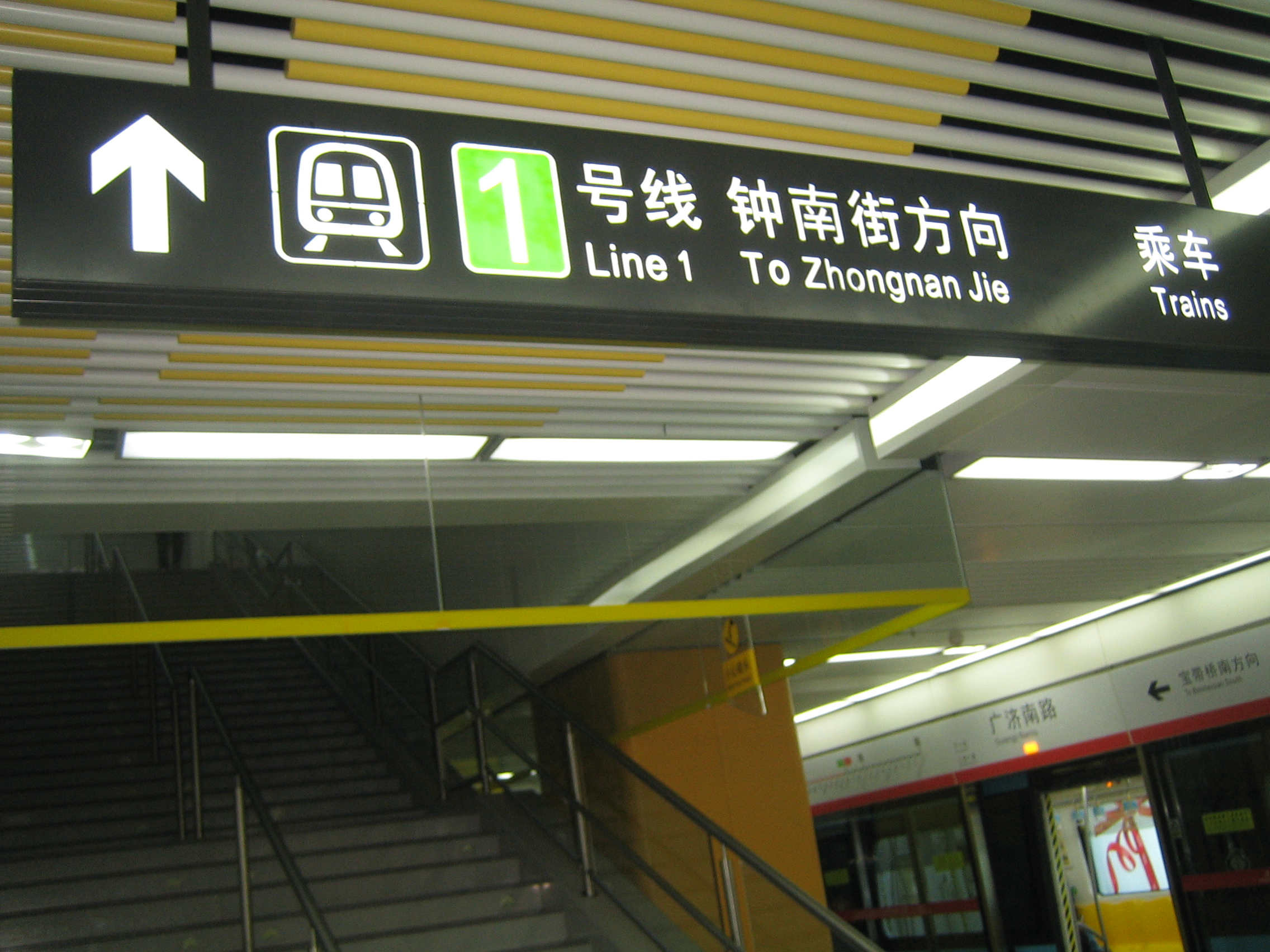
Interchange signage in Guangji Nanlu station

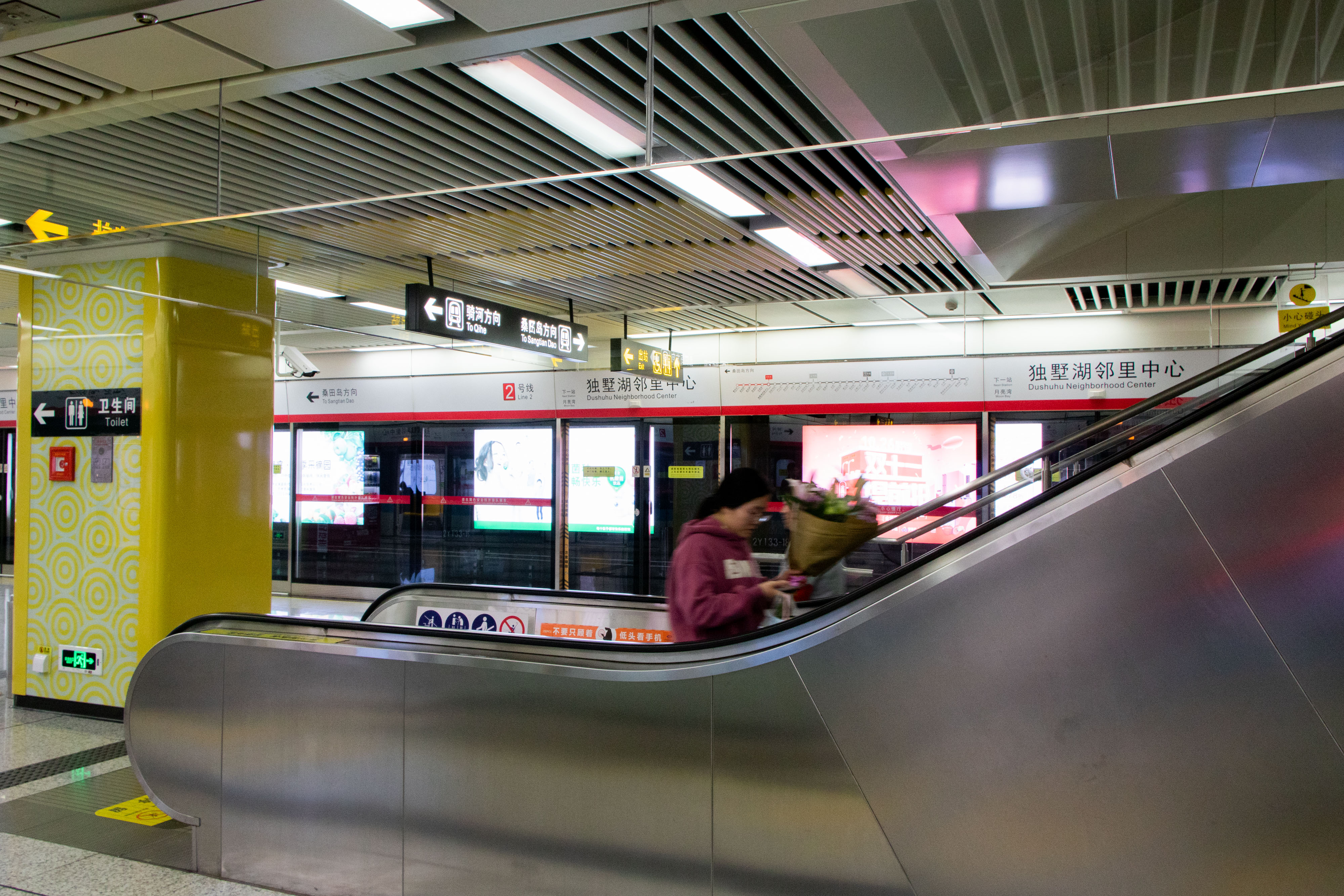
Platform of Dushuhu Neighborhood Center station

Station name		Connections	Distance km		Location
English	Chinese	Connections	Distance km		Location
Qihe	骑河		0.00	0.00	Xiangcheng
Fuxianglu	富翔路		0.88	0.88	Xiangcheng
Suzhoubei Railway Station	高铁苏州北站	7 10; OHH	1.08	1.96	Xiangcheng
Dawan	大湾		1.51	3.47	Xiangcheng
Fuyuan Lu	富元路		1.98	5.45	Xiangcheng
Likou	蠡口		1.70	7.15	Xiangcheng
Xutu Gang	徐图港		1.40	8.55	Xiangcheng
Yangchenghu Zhonglu	阳澄湖中路	8	1.00	9.55	Xiangcheng
Lumu	陆慕		1.93	11.48	Xiangcheng
Pinglonglu East	平泷路东		1.64	13.12	Xiangcheng
Pinghelu	平河路	6	0.81	13.93	Gusu
Suzhou Railway Station	苏州火车站	4 SZH	1.06	14.99	Gusu
Shantang Jie	山塘街		1.62	16.61	Gusu
Shi Lu	石路		0.96	17.57	Gusu
Guangji Nanlu	广济南路	1	0.81	18.38	Gusu
Sanxiang Square	三香广场		0.88	19.26	Gusu
Laodonglu	劳动路	5	0.62	19.88	Gusu
Xujiang Lu	胥江路		0.77	20.65	Gusu
Tongjing Park	桐泾公园		0.73	21.38	Gusu
Youlian	友联		1.24	22.62	Gusu
Panlilu	盘蠡路	3	1.10	23.72	Wuzhong
Xinjia Qiao	新家桥		1.08	24.80	Wuzhong
Shihu Donglu	石湖东路	4	1.62	26.42	Wuzhong
Baodaiqiao South	宝带桥南		1.88	28.30	Wuzhong
Yinzhong Lu	尹中路		1.50	29.80	Wuzhong
Guoxiang	郭巷	7	0.90	30.70	Wuzhong
Guoyuan Lu	郭苑路		1.02	31.72	Wuzhong
Yinshan Hu	尹山湖		1.07	32.79	Wuzhong
Dushuhu South	独墅湖南		0.89	33.68	Wuzhong
Dushuhu Neighborhood Center	独墅湖邻里中心		2.03	35.71	SIP
Moon Bay	月亮湾		0.91	36.62	SIP
Songtaojie	松涛街	8	1.23	37.85	SIP
Jingu Lu	金谷路		1.75	39.60	SIP
Jinshang Lu	金尚路	6	1.33	40.93	SIP
Sangtiandao	桑田岛	6	1.07	42.00	SIP

== Operations ==
=== Intervals ===
Weekdays & Weekends
Period	Time	Intervals
Weekdays morning rush hours (Peak)	7:45 — 9:00	6m10s
Weekdays evening rush hours (Peak)	17:00 — 19:00	6m10s
Weekends daily rush hours (Peak)	11:00 — 20:40	6m10s
Other hours (Normal)	Exclude above rush hours	6m50s

== Rolling stock ==
Fleet numbers	Year built	Time in service	Builder	Class	Number in service	No of car	Assembly	Rolling stock	Number	Depots	Line assigned	Notes
105 (23 sets)	2013-2015	2014-present	CSR Nanjing Puzhen	B	105 (23 sets)	5	Tc+Mp+M + Mp+Tc	PM061	020101-022305 (0201-0223)	Taiping Yard	2	
85 (17 sets)	2014-2016	2016-present	CSR Nanjing Puzhen	B	85 (17 sets)	5	Tc+Mp+M + Mp+Tc	PM080	022401-024005 (0224-0240)	Taiping Yard	2	
100 (20 sets)	2022-2023	2023-present	CRRC Nanjing Puzhen	B	100 (20 sets)	5	Tc+Mp+M + Mp+Tc	PM208	022501-026005 (0225-0260)	Taiping Yard	2	
