= Baodaiqiao South station =

Suzhou Metro station

Coordinates: 31°15′07″N 120°38′38″E

Baodaiqiao South 宝带桥南
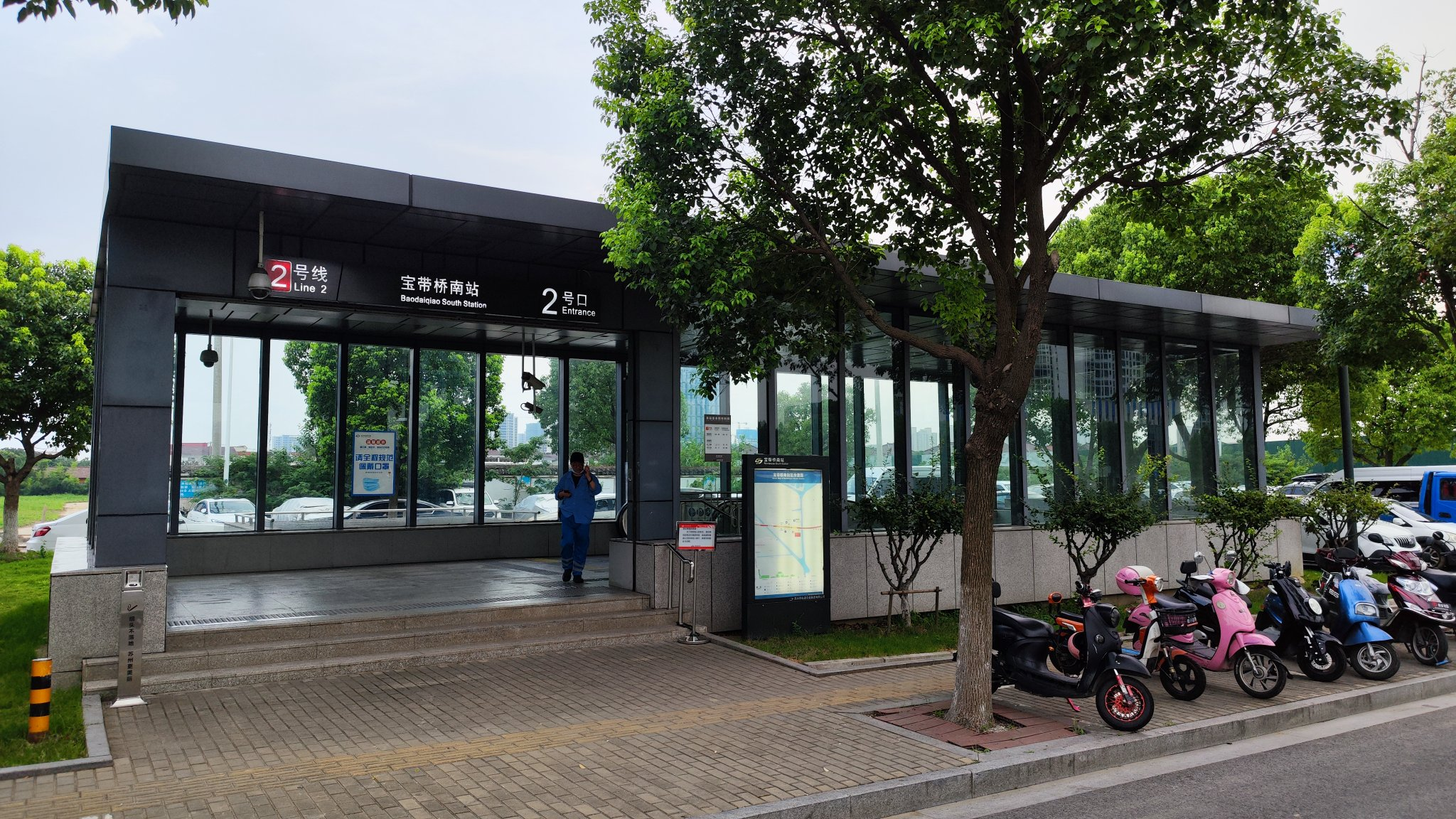

General information
- Location: Wuzhong District, Suzhou, Jiangsu; China
- Operated by: Suzhou Rail Transit Co., Ltd
- Line(s): Line 2
- Platforms: 2 (1 island platform)

Construction
- Structure type: Underground

History
- Opened: December 28, 2013

Services
Preceding station	Suzhou Rail Transit	Following station
Shihu Donglu towards Qihe	Line 2	Yinzhong Lu towards Sangtiandao

Baodaiqiao South Station (Chinese: 宝带桥南站; literally Precious Belt Bridge South Station) is a station on Line 2 of the Suzhou Metro. The station is located in Wuzhong District of Suzhou. It started operation on December 28, 2013, the same time of the operation of Line 2.

== See also ==
- Precious Belt Bridge
