= Xiangcheng, Suzhou =

Xiangcheng 相城区
- District
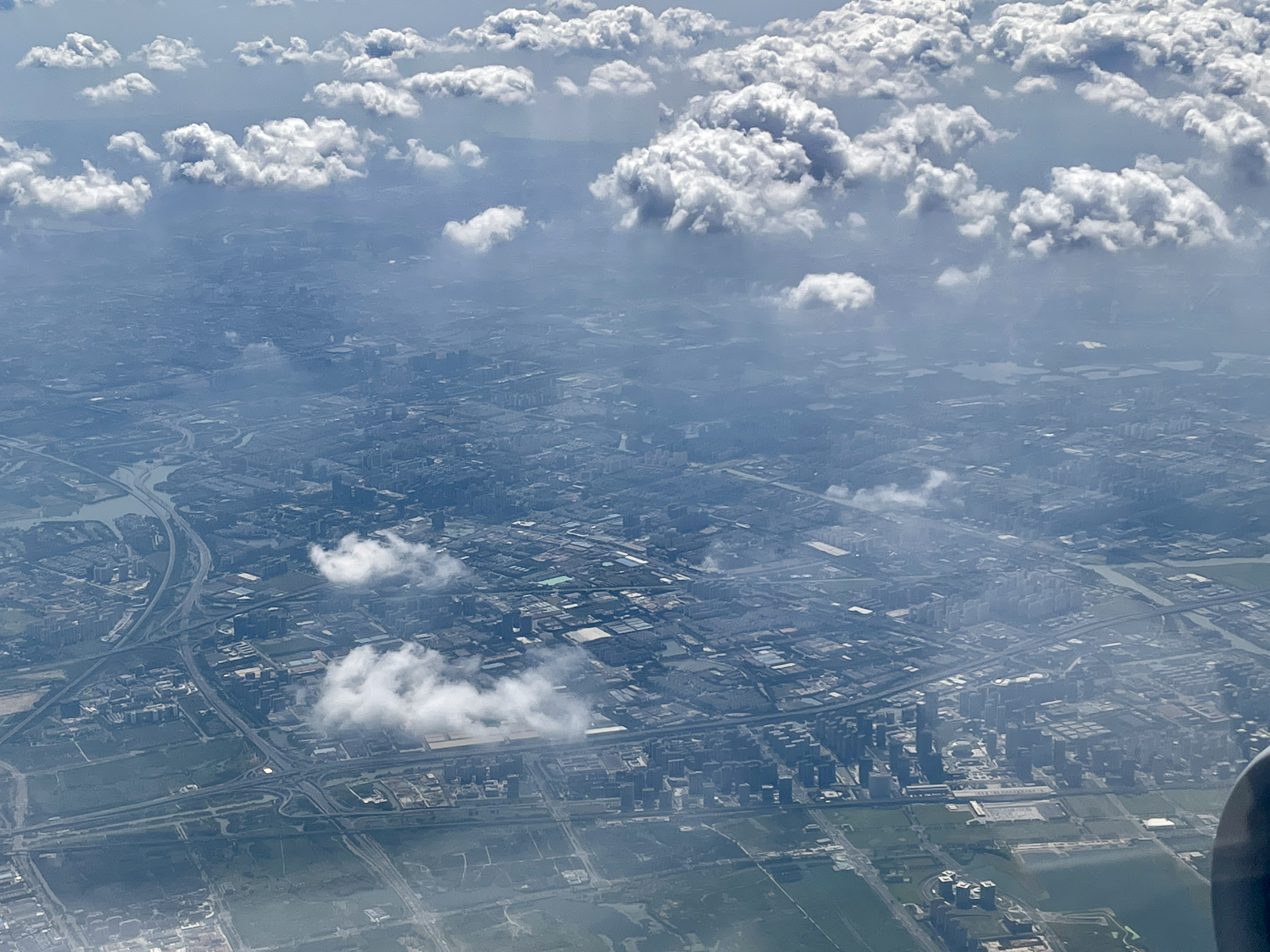
- Aerial View

- Location in Jiangsu
- Coordinates: 31°26′36″N 120°34′25″E
- Country: People's Republic of China
- Province: Jiangsu
- Prefecture-level city: Suzhou

Area
  - District: 483.6 km^{2} (186.7 sq mi)

Population (2020 census)
  - District: 891,055
  - Density: 1,843/km^{2} (4,772/sq mi)
  - Urban: 839,374
  - Rural: 51,681
- Time zone: UTC+8 (China Standard)
- Postal code: 215131

Xiangcheng District (simplified Chinese: 相城区; traditional Chinese: 相城區; pinyin: Xiàngchéng Qū) is one of the five urban districts of Suzhou, Jiangsu province, China. It has a land area of 478 km^{2} and had a population of 891,055 in 2020.

== Administrative divisions ==
In the present, Xiangcheng District has 4 subdistricts, and 4 towns under its jurisdiction.

4 subdistricts

- Yuanhe (元和街道)
- Taiping (太平街道)
- Huangqiao (黄桥街道)
- Beiqiao (北桥街道)

4 towns

- Wangting (望亭镇)
- Huangdai (黄埭镇)
- Weitang (渭塘镇)
- Yangchenghu (阳澄湖镇)

Other

- Xiangcheng Economic Development Zone (相城经济开发区)

== See also ==
- Wu County
