= Sangtiandao station =

Suzhou Metro station

Coordinates: 31°16′28″N 120°46′37″E

Sangtiandao 桑田岛
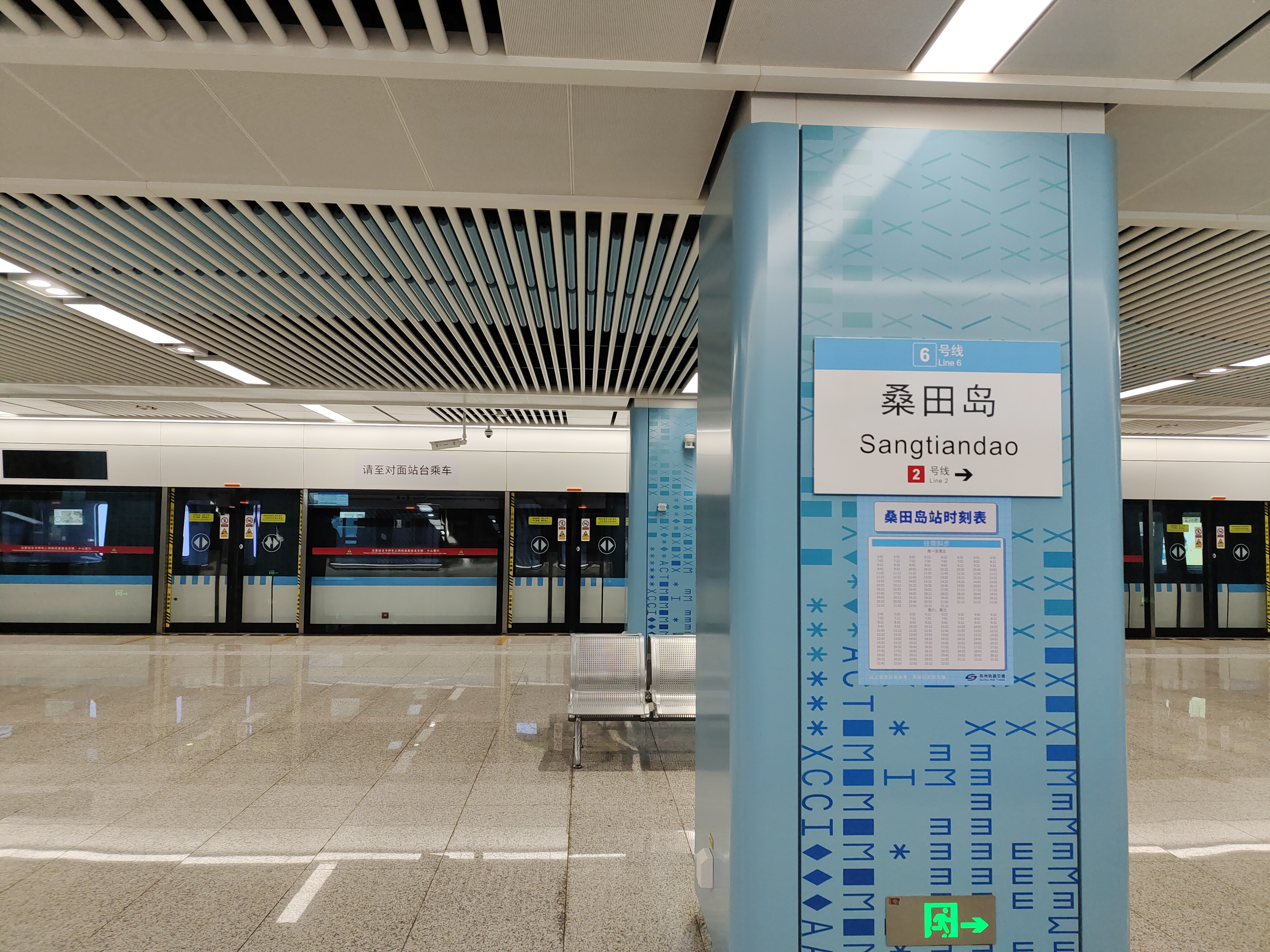
- Line 6 platform

General information
- Location: Gusu District, Suzhou, Jiangsu; China
- Operated by: Suzhou Rail Transit Co., Ltd
- Line(s): Line 2 Line 6
- Platforms: 4 (2 island platforms)

Construction
- Structure type: Underground

History
- Opened: September 24, 2016

Services
Preceding station	Suzhou Metro	Following station
Jinshang Lu towards Qihe	Line 2	Terminus
Jinshang Lu towards Suzhou Xinqu Railway Station	Line 6	Terminus

Sangtiandao Station (Chinese: 桑田岛) is the eastern terminus of Line 2 and temporary eastern terminus of Line 6 (until Huayun station opens) of the Suzhou Metro. The station is located in Gusu District of Suzhou and started operation on September 24, 2016, with the opening of the Baodaiqiao South - Sangtiandao extension on Line 2. It is one of three interchanges between Line 2 and Line 6.
