= Qihe station =

Metro station in Suzhou, China

Qihe 骑河
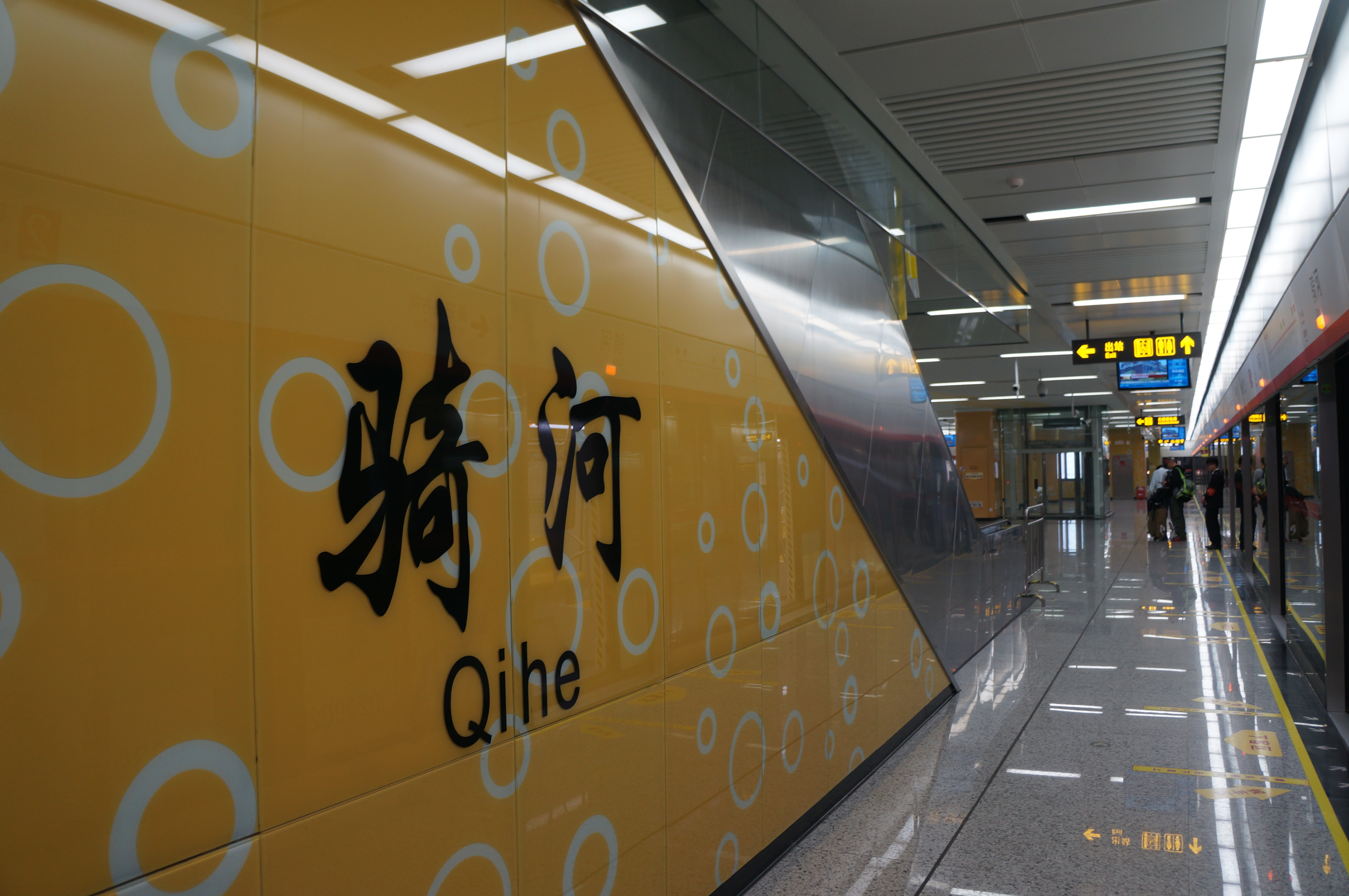

General information
- Location: Xiangrong Road (相融路) × Taidong Road (太东路); Xiangcheng District, Suzhou, Jiangsu; China
- Coordinates: 31°26′23″N 120°39′03″E
- Operated by: Suzhou Rail Transit Co., Ltd
- Line: Line 2
- Platforms: 2 (1 island platform)

Construction
- Structure type: Underground
- Accessible: Yes

History
- Opened: September 24, 2016

Services
Preceding station	Suzhou Metro	Following station
Terminus	Line 2	Fuxianglu towards Sangtiandao
Location

Qihe Station (Chinese: 骑河) is a station on Line 2 of the Suzhou Metro, and the northern terminus of Line 2. The station is located in Xiangcheng District of Suzhou. It started service in September 24, 2016, when Line 2 extension started service.
