= Huolidao station =

Suzhou Metro station

Huolidao 活力岛
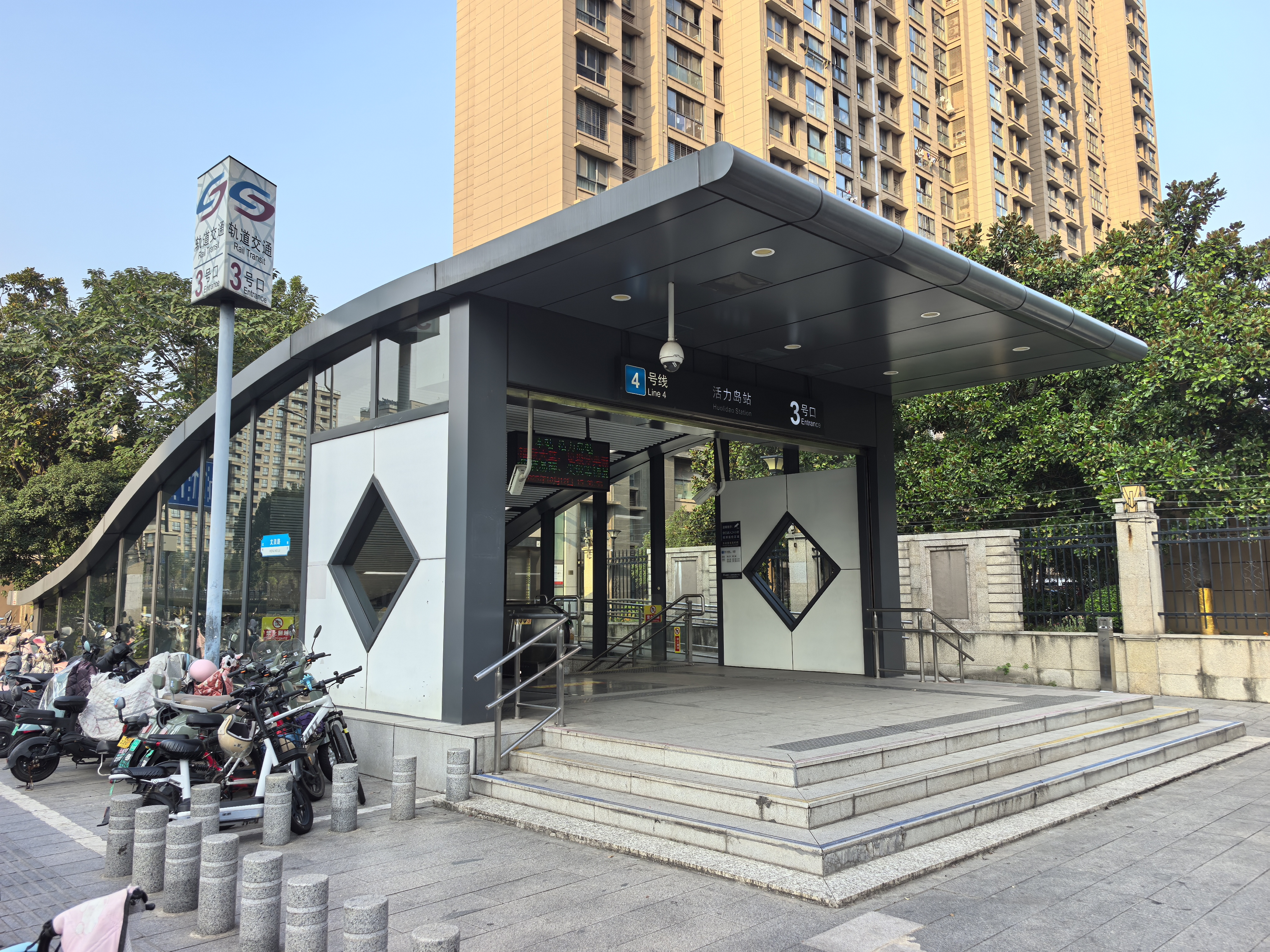

General information
- Location: Wenling Road × Jumao Street; Xiangcheng District, Suzhou, Jiangsu; China
- Coordinates: 31°22′36″N 120°35′46″E
- Operated by: Suzhou Rail Transit Co., Ltd
- Line: Line 4
- Platforms: 2 (1 island platform)

Construction
- Structure type: Underground

History
- Opened: April 15, 2017

Services
Preceding station	Suzhou Metro	Following station
Yaoxiang towards Longdaobang	Line 4	Sunwu Jinianyuan towards Tongli
Location

Huolidao Station (Chinese: 活力岛) is a station on Line 4 of the Suzhou Metro. The station is located in Xiangcheng District of Suzhou. It has been in use since April 15, 2017, when Line 4 first opened.
