= Chayuanchang station =

Metro station in Suzhou, China

Chayuanchang 察院场
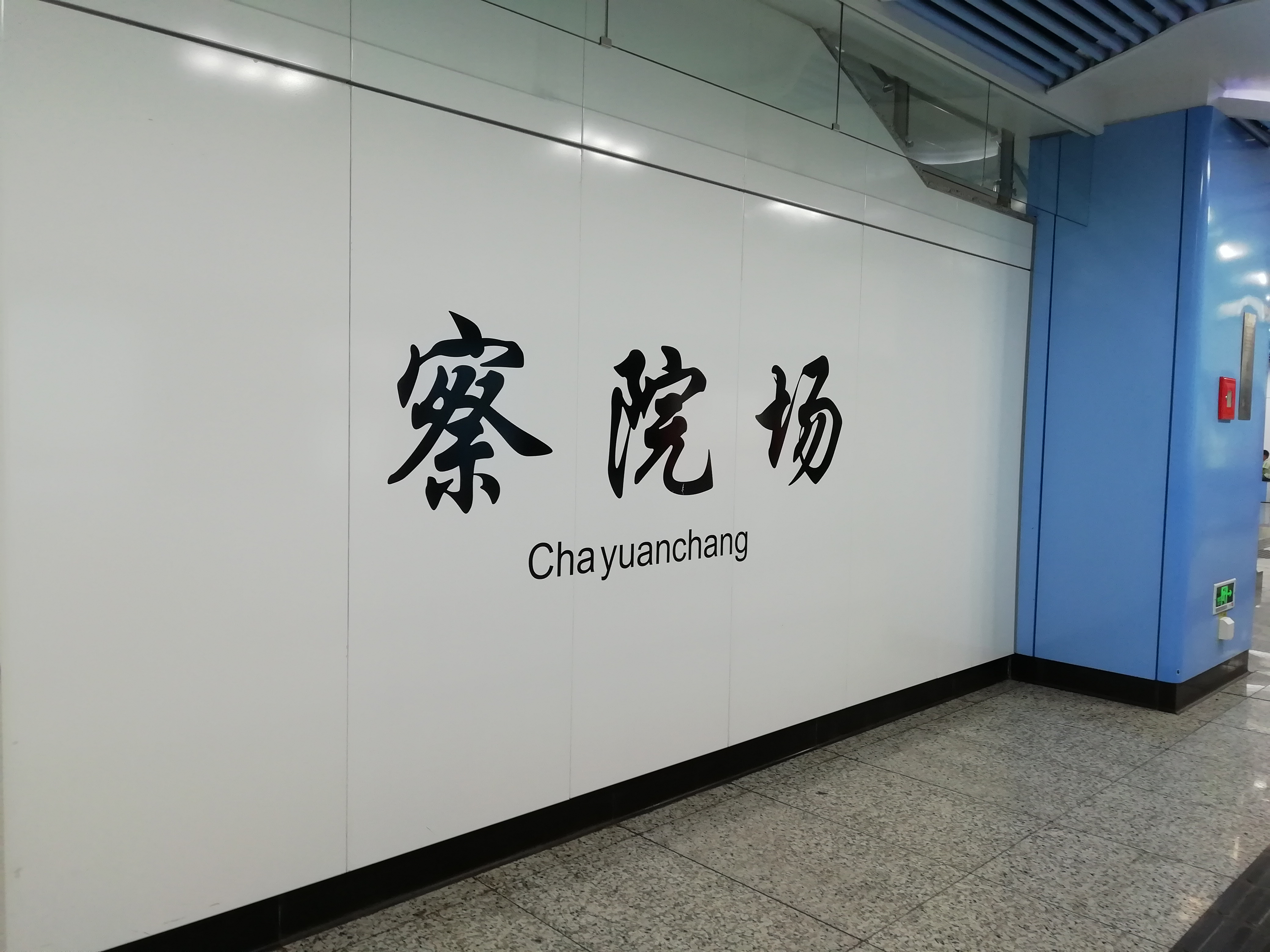

General information
- Location: Renmin Road × Jingde Road; Gusu District, Suzhou, Jiangsu; China
- Coordinates: 31°18′47″N 120°37′02″E
- Operated by: Suzhou Rail Transit Co., Ltd
- Line: Line 4
- Platforms: 2 (1 island platform)

Construction
- Structure type: Underground

History
- Opened: April 15, 2017

Services
| Preceding station | Suzhou Metro | Following station |
|---|---|---|
| Beisita towards Longdaobang | Line 4 | Leqiao towards Tongli |
Location

Chayuanchang (Chinese: 察院场) is a station on Line 4 of the Suzhou Metro. The station is located in Gusu District of Suzhou. It has been in use since April 15, 2017, when Line 4 first opened.
