= Baodailu station =

Suzhou Metro station

Baodailu 宝带路
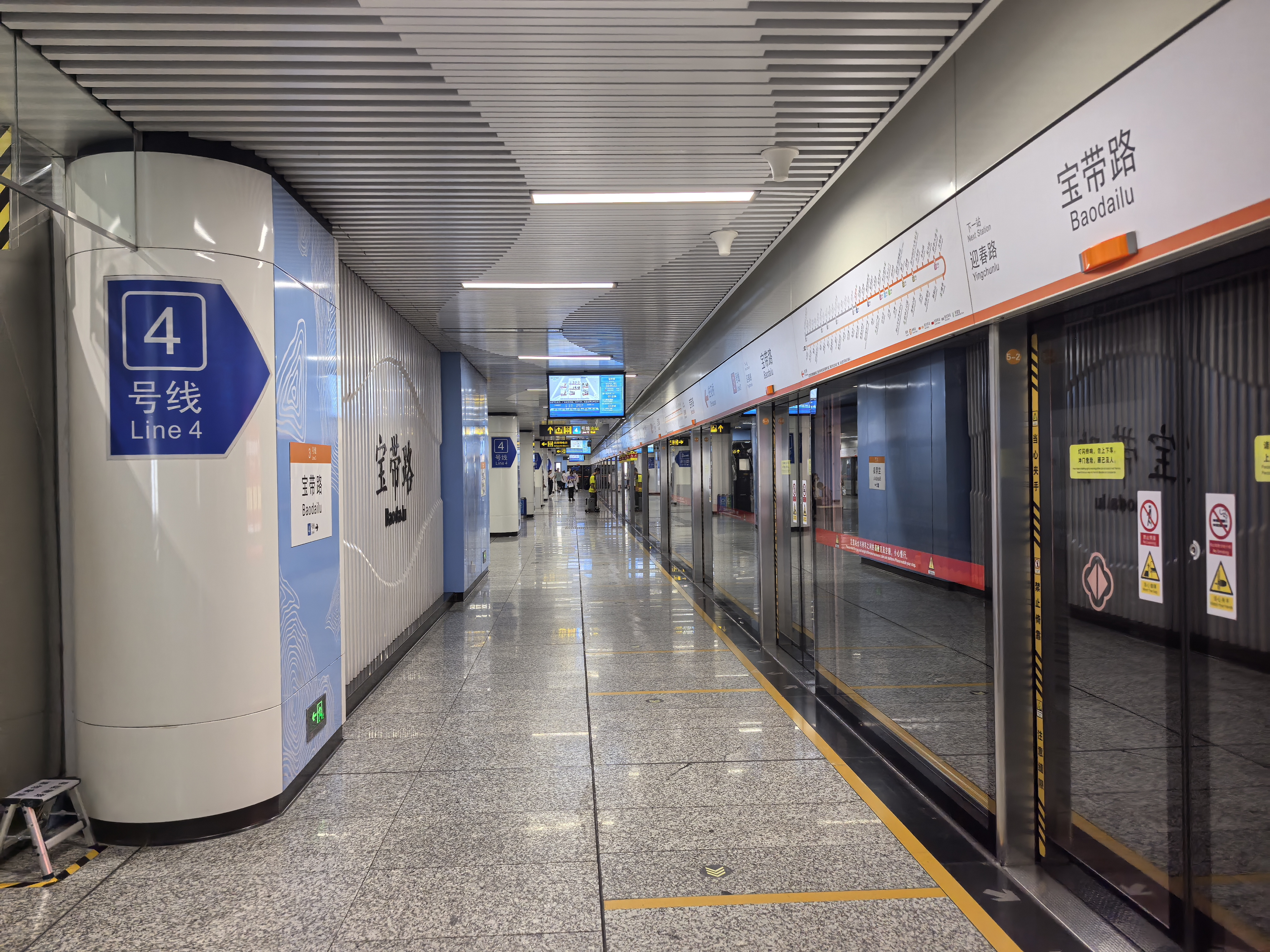
- Line 3 platform

General information
- Location: Baodai West/East Road × Dongwu North Road; Wuzhong District, Suzhou, Jiangsu; China
- Coordinates: 31°16′09″N 120°37′27″E
- Operated by: Suzhou Rail Transit Co., Ltd
- Lines: Line 3 Line 4
- Platforms: 4 (2 island platforms)

Construction
- Structure type: Underground

History
- Opened: 15 April 2017 (Line 4); 25 December 2019 (Line 3)
- Previous names: Baodai Lu

Services
Preceding station	Suzhou Metro	Following station
Panlilu towards Suzhou Xinqu Railway Station	Line 3	Yingchunlu towards Weiting
Tuanjieqiao towards Longdaobang	Line 4	Shihu Donglu towards Tongli
Location

Baodailu (simplified Chinese: 宝带路; traditional Chinese: 寶帶路), formerly knows as Baodai Lu, is a station of Line 3 and Line 4 of the Suzhou Metro.

== History ==
The station is located in Wuzhong District of Suzhou. It has been in use since 15 April 2017, when Line 4 first opened. The Line 3 platforms opened on 25 December 2019.
