= Sanyuanfang station =

Suzhou Metro station

Sanyuanfang 三元坊
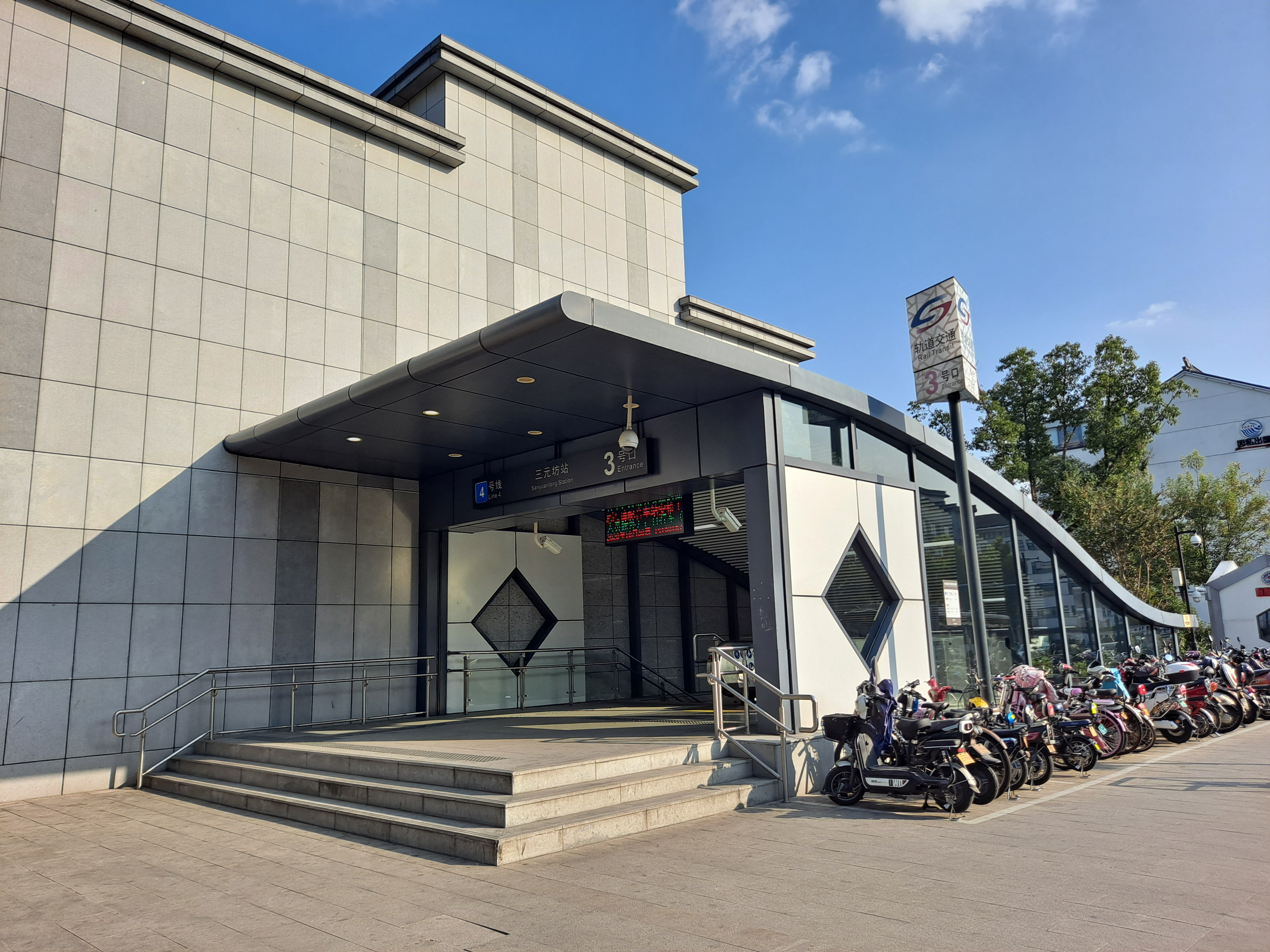

General information
- Location: Renmin Road × Shiquan Street & Shuyuan Alley; Gusu District, Suzhou, Jiangsu; China
- Coordinates: 31°18′00″N 120°37′10″E
- Operated by: Suzhou Rail Transit Co., Ltd
- Line: Line 4
- Platforms: 2 (1 island platform)

Construction
- Structure type: Underground

History
- Opened: April 15, 2017

Services
Preceding station	Suzhou Metro	Following station
Leqiao towards Longdaobang	Line 4	Nanmen towards Tongli
Location

Sanyuanfang (Chinese: 三元坊) is a station on Line 4 of the Suzhou Metro. The station is located in Gusu District of Suzhou. It has been in use since April 15, 2017, when Line 4 first opened.
