= Pinglonglu West station =

Suzhou Metro station

Pinglonglu West 平泷路西
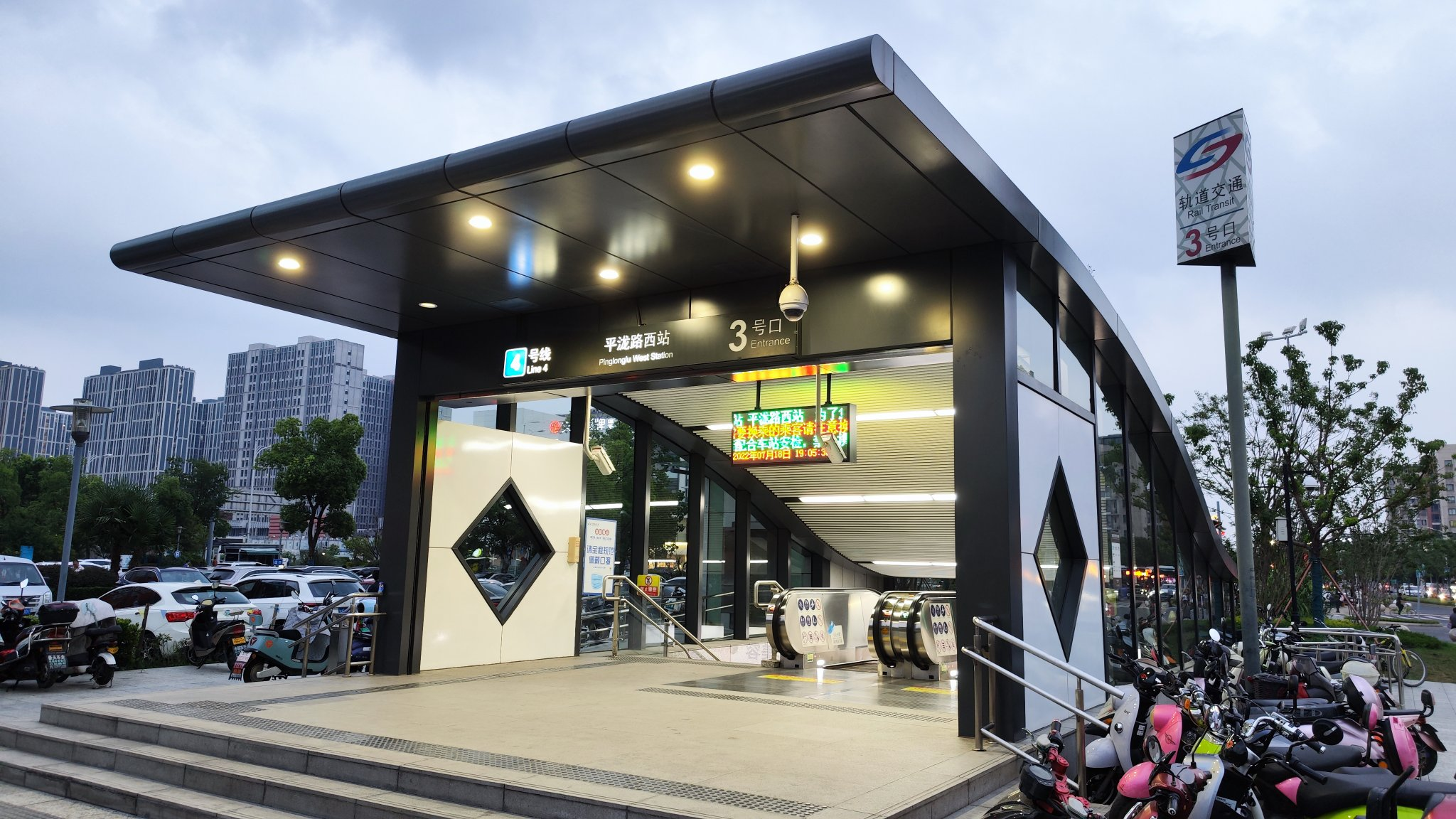

General information
- Location: Guangji North Road × Pinglong Road; Gusu District, Suzhou, Jiangsu; China
- Coordinates: 31°20′43″N 120°35′55″E
- Operated by: Suzhou Rail Transit Co., Ltd
- Line: Line 4
- Platforms: 2 (1 island platform)

Construction
- Structure type: Underground

History
- Opened: April 15, 2017

Services
Preceding station	Suzhou Metro	Following station
Sunwu Jinianyuan towards Longdaobang	Line 4	Sujin towards Tongli
Location

Pinglonglu West (Chinese: 平泷路西) is a station on Line 4 of the Suzhou Metro. The station is located in Gusu District of Suzhou. It has been in use since April 15, 2017, when Line 4 first opened.
