= Wujiang Coach Station =

Suzhou Metro station

Wujiang Coach Station 吴江汽车站
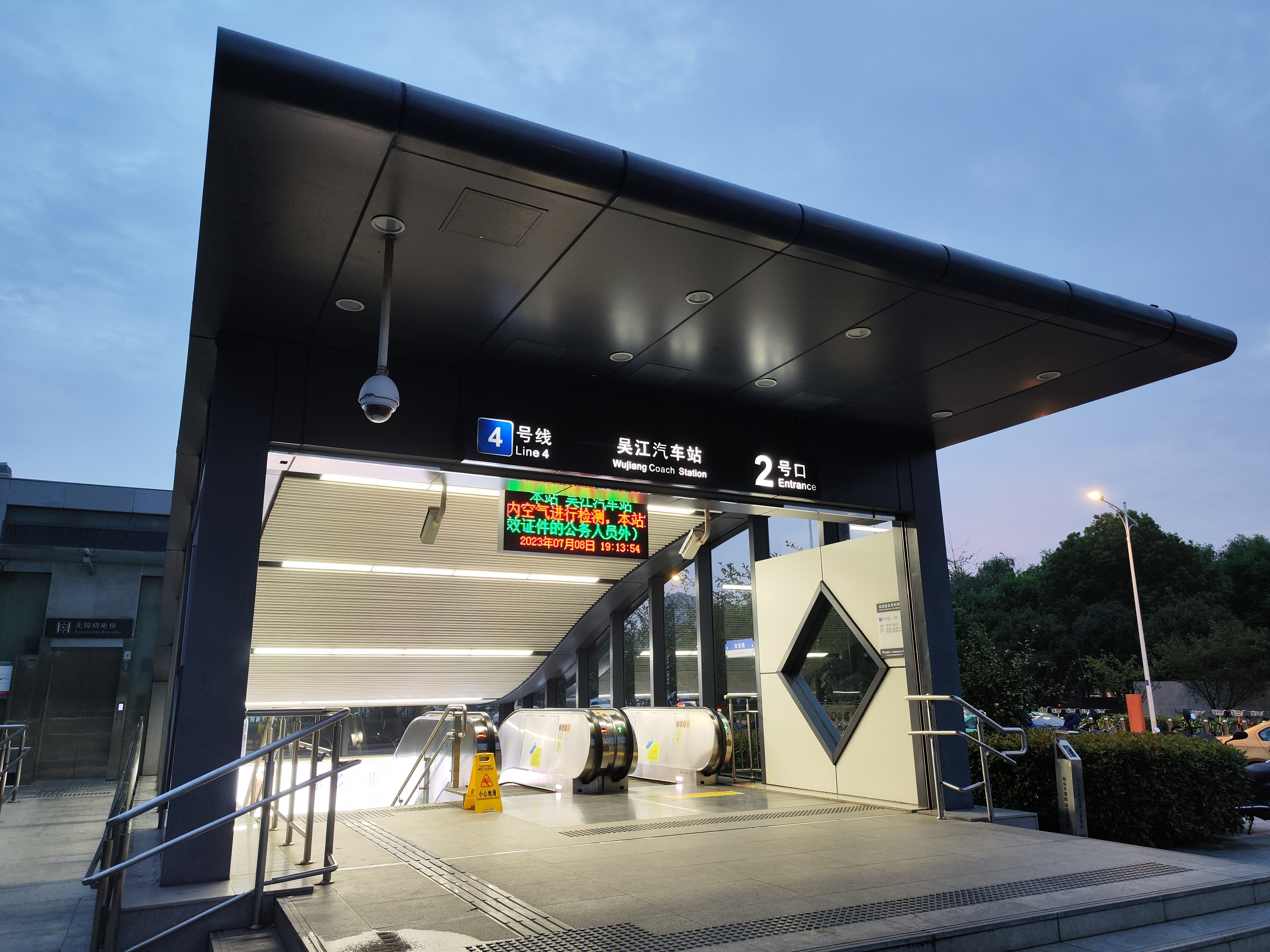

General information
- Location: Bailong Road; Wujiang District, Suzhou, Jiangsu; China
- Coordinates: 31°08′21″N 120°39′31″E
- Operated by: Suzhou Rail Transit Co., Ltd
- Line: Line 4
- Platforms: 2 (1 island platform)

Construction
- Structure type: Underground

History
- Opened: April 15, 2017

Services
| Preceding station | Suzhou Metro | Following station |
|---|---|---|
| Wujiang Renmin Guangchang towards Longdaobang | Line 4 | Pangjin Lu towards Tongli |
Location

Wujiang Coach Station (Chinese: 吴江汽车站) is a station on Line 4 of the Suzhou Metro. The station is located in the Wujiang District of Suzhou. It has been in use since April 15, 2017, when Line 4 first opened.
