= Suzhou Railway Station metro station =

Suzhou Metro station

Coordinates: 31°19′57″N 120°36′23″E

Suzhou Railway Station 苏州火车站
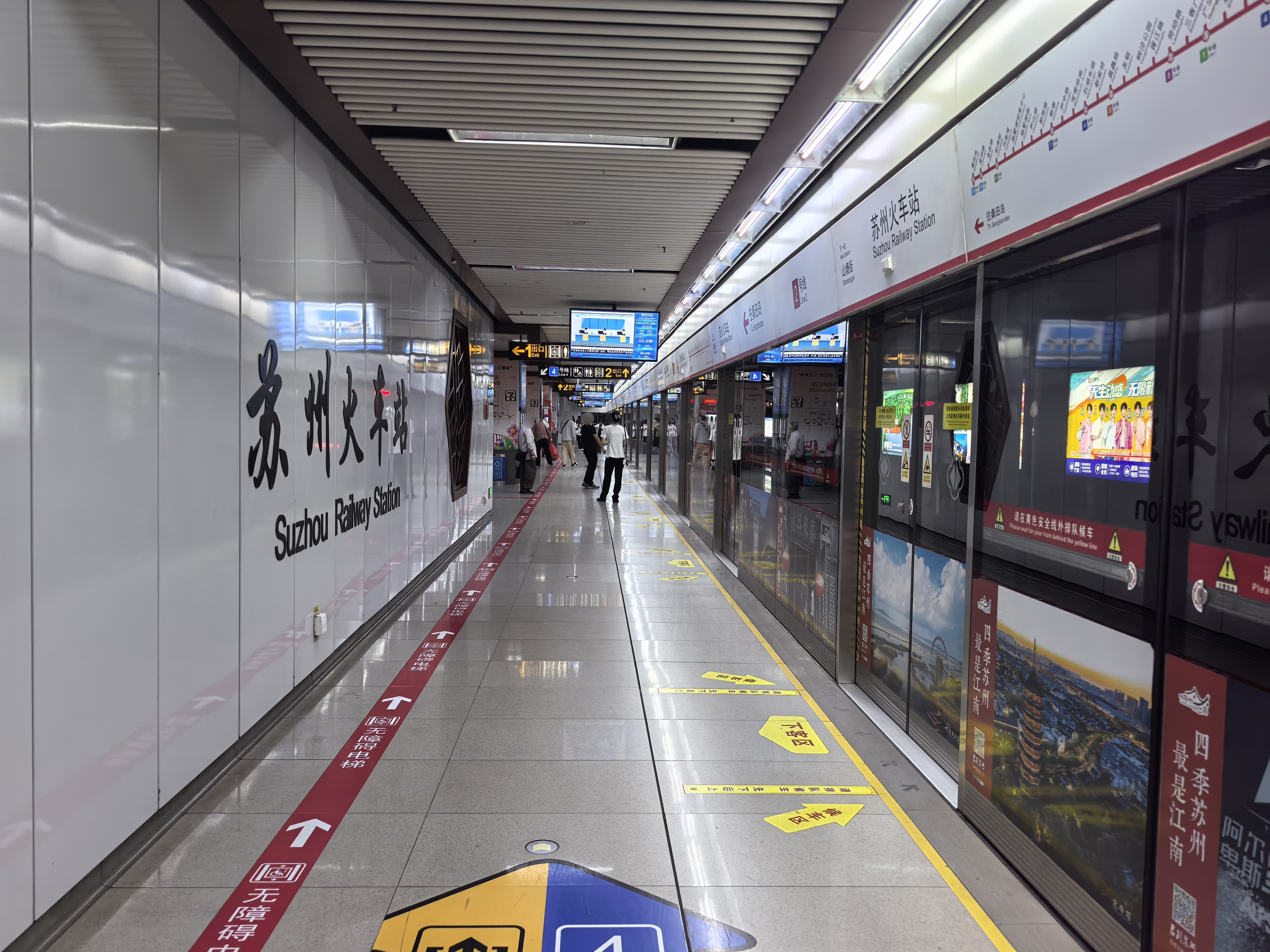
- Line 2 platform

General information
- Location: Gusu District, Suzhou, Jiangsu; China
- Operated by: Suzhou Rail Transit Co., Ltd
- Lines: Line 2; Line 4
- Platforms: 4 (2 island platforms)
- Connections: Suzhou railway station

Construction
- Structure type: Underground

History
- Opened: December 28, 2013

Services
Preceding station	Suzhou Metro	Following station
Pinghe Lu towards Qihe	Line 2	Shantang Jie towards Sangtiandao
Sujin towards Longdaobang	Line 4	Beisita towards Tongli
Location

Suzhou railway station (Chinese: 苏州火车站) is a station on Line 2 and Line 4 of the Suzhou Metro. The station is located at the Suzhou railway station in Gusu District of Suzhou. It started service on December 28, 2013 with the opening of Line 2.
