= Liuhong Lu station =

Suzhou Metro station

Liuhong Lu 流虹路
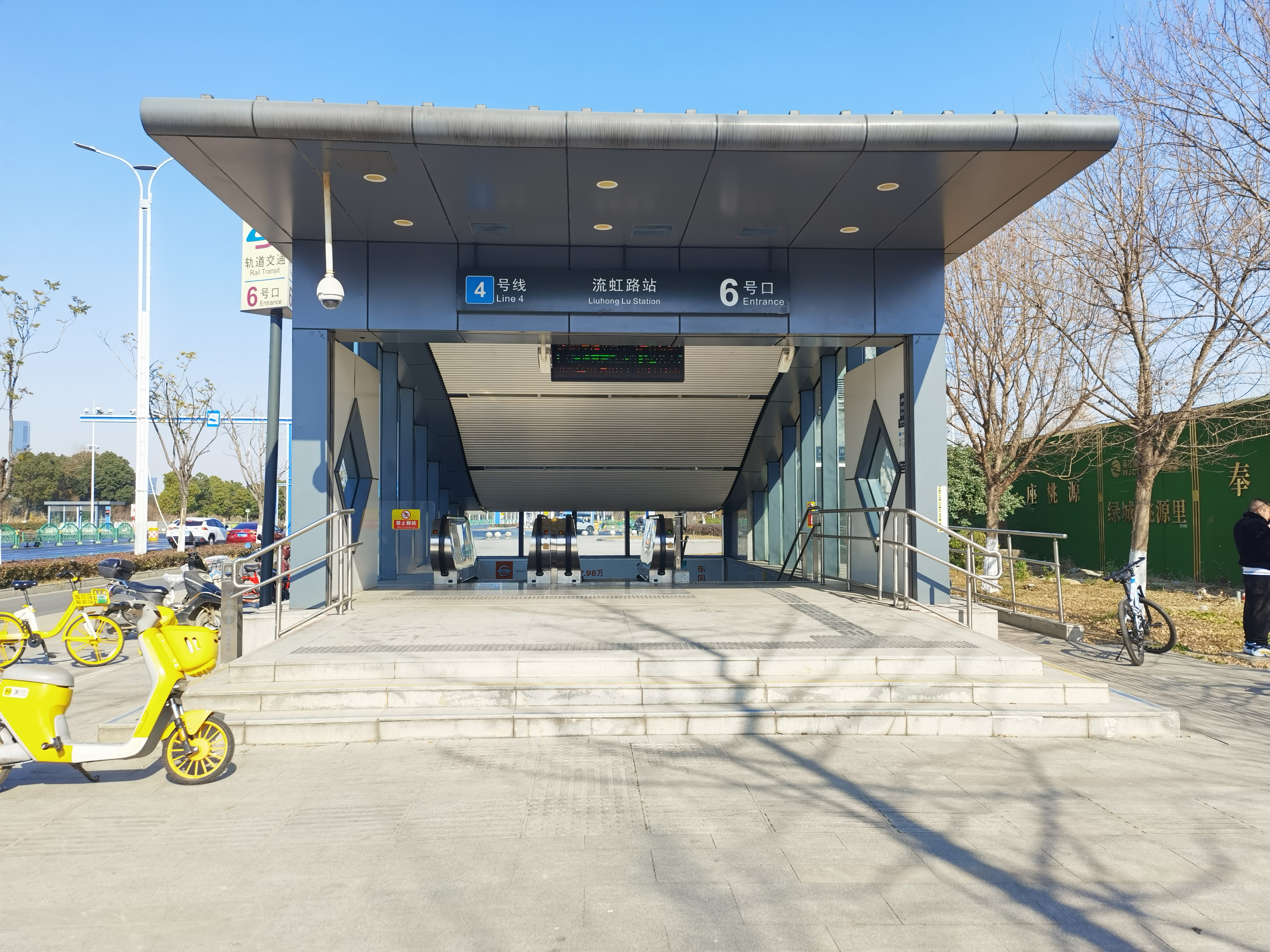

General information
- Location: Qiufeng Street × Liuhong Road; Wujiang District, Suzhou, Jiangsu; China
- Coordinates: 31°09′53″N 120°36′53″E
- Operated by: Suzhou Rail Transit Co., Ltd
- Line: Line 4
- Platforms: 2 (1 island platform)

Construction
- Structure type: Underground

History
- Opened: April 15, 2017

Services
Preceding station	Suzhou Metro	Following station
Jiangxing Xilu towards Longdaobang	Line 4	Lize Lu towards Tongli
Location

Liuhong Lu (Chinese: 流虹路) is a station on Line 4 of the Suzhou Metro. The station is located in the Wujiang District of Suzhou. It has been in use since April 15, 2017, when Line 4 first opened.
