= Songling Dadao station =

Suzhou Metro station

Songling Dadao 松陵大道
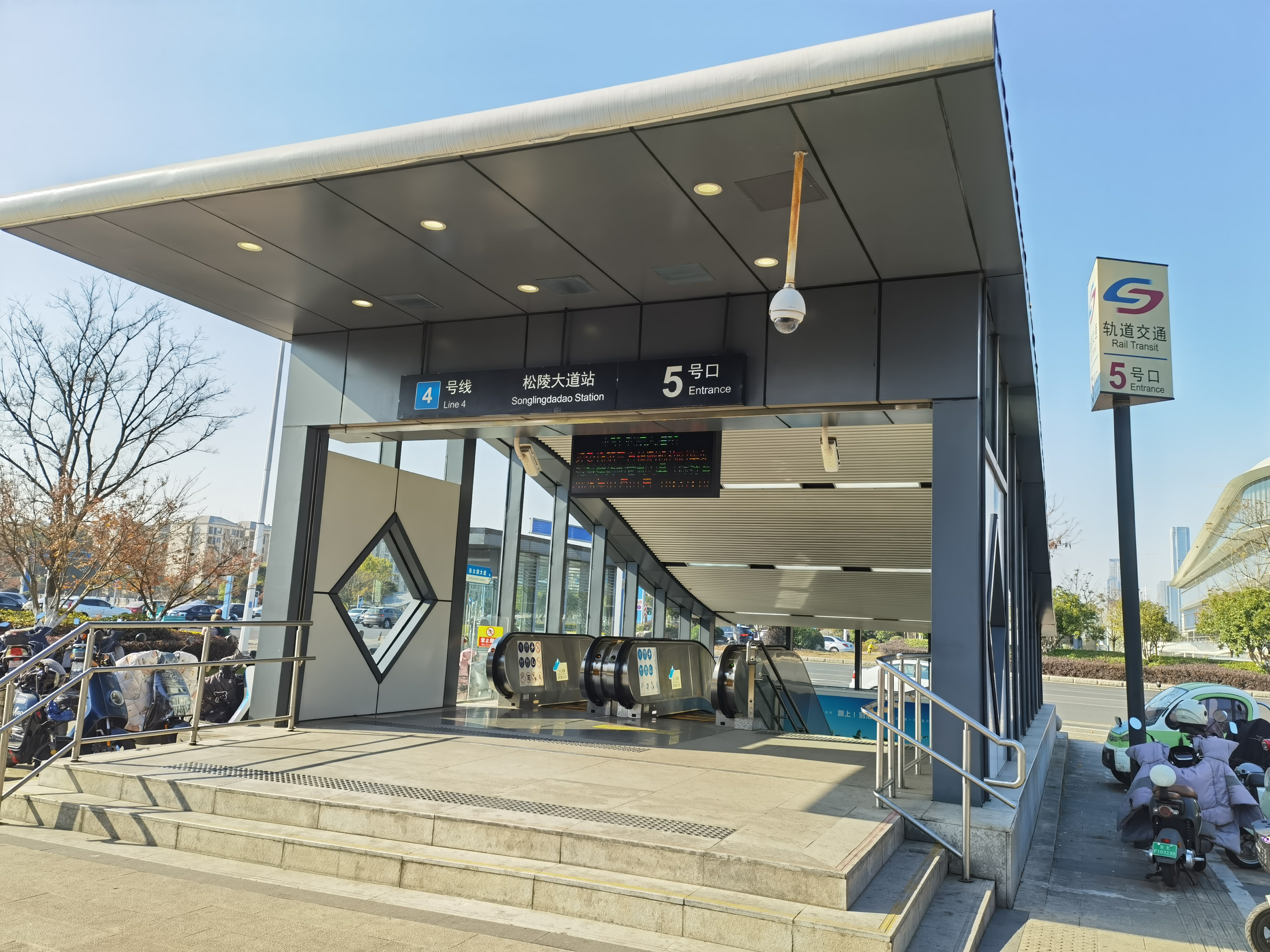

General information
- Location: Dongtaihu Avenue × Songling Avenue; Wujiang District, Suzhou, Jiangsu; China
- Coordinates: 31°08′01″N 120°37′11″E
- Operated by: Suzhou Rail Transit Co., Ltd
- Line: Line 4
- Platforms: 2 (1 island platform)

Construction
- Structure type: Underground

History
- Opened: April 15, 2017

Services
Preceding station	Suzhou Metro	Following station
Suzhouwan East towards Longdaobang	Line 4	Wujiang Renmin Guangchang towards Tongli
Location

Songling Dadao (Chinese: 松陵大道) is a station on Line 4 of the Suzhou Metro. The station is located in the Wujiang District of Suzhou. It has been in use since April 15, 2017, when Line 4 first opened.
