= Lize Lu station =

Suzhou Metro station

Lize Lu 笠泽路
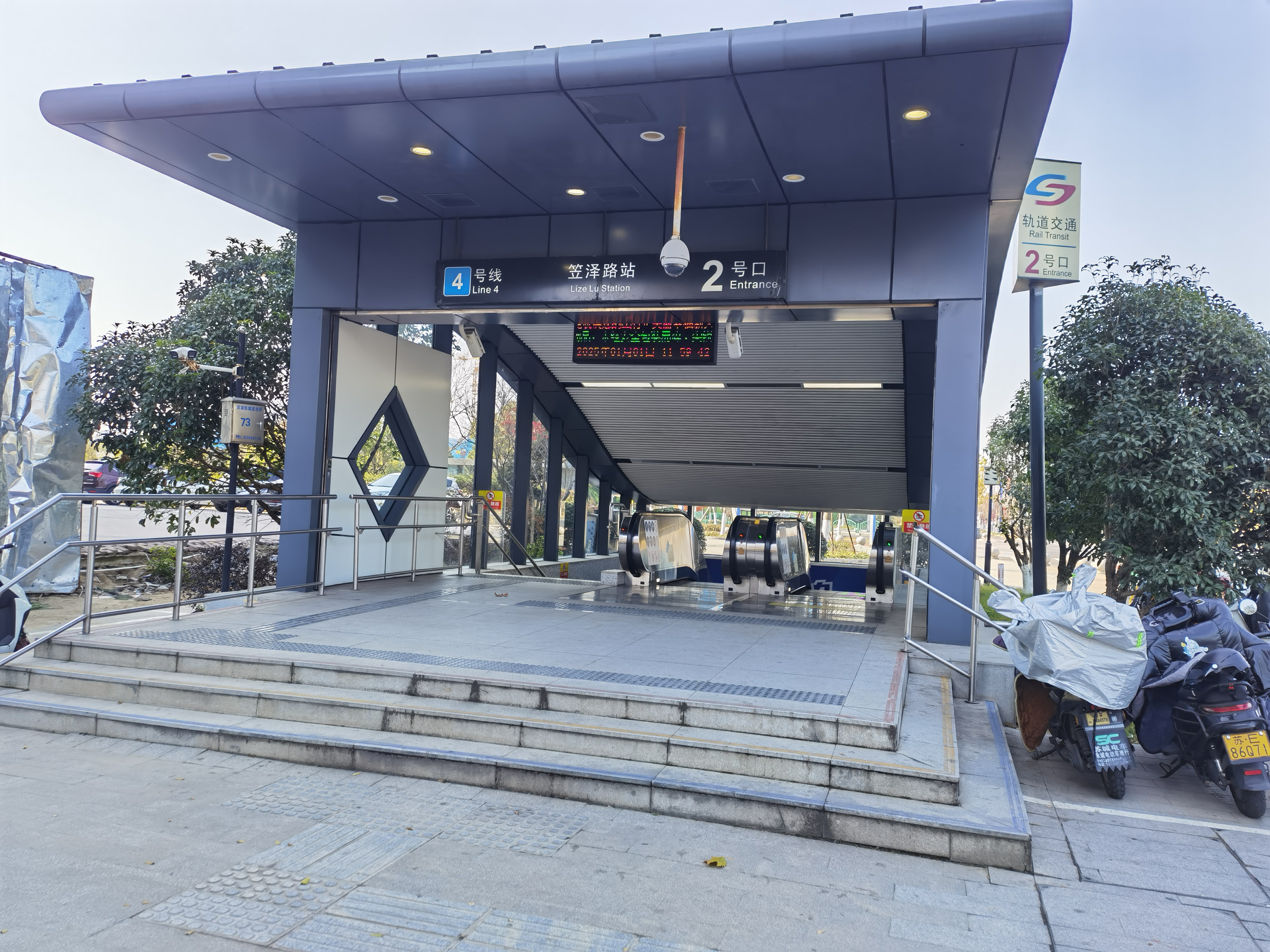

General information
- Location: Qiufeng Street × Lize Road; Wujiang District, Suzhou, Jiangsu; China
- Coordinates: 31°09′25″N 120°36′42″E
- Operated by: Suzhou Rail Transit Co., Ltd
- Line: Line 4
- Platforms: 2 (1 island platform)

Construction
- Structure type: Underground

History
- Opened: April 15, 2017

Services
Preceding station	Suzhou Metro	Following station
Liuhong Lu towards Longdaobang	Line 4	Gujiadang towards Tongli
Location

Lize Lu (Chinese: 笠泽路) is a station on Line 4 of the Suzhou Metro. The station is located in the Wujiang District of Suzhou. It has been in use since April 15, 2017, when Line 4 first opened.
