= Nanmen station =

Suzhou Metro station

Nanmen 南门
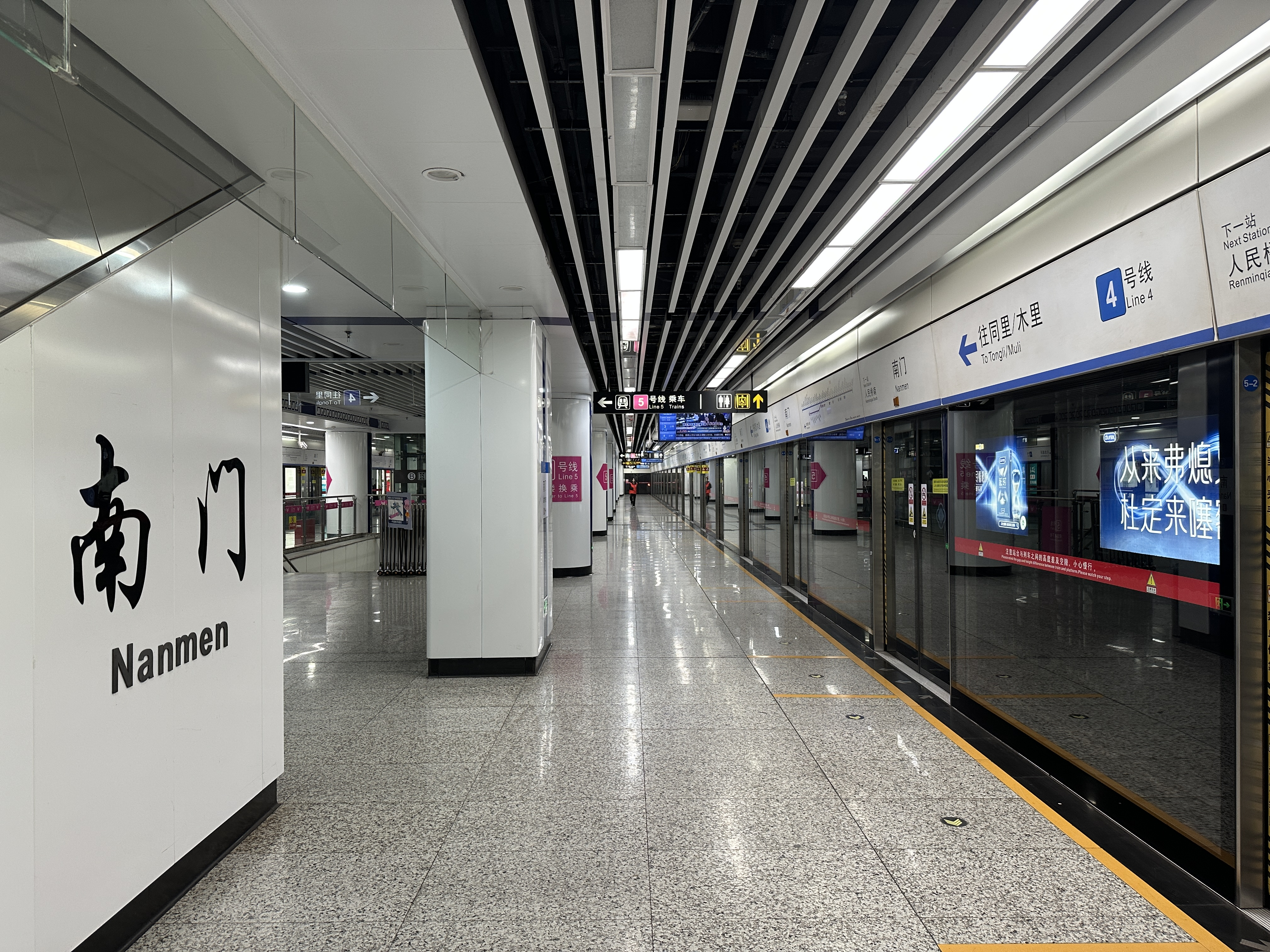
- Line 4 platform

General information
- Location: Renmin Road × Xinshi Road & Zhuhui Road; Gusu District, Suzhou, Jiangsu; China
- Coordinates: 31°17′39″N 120°37′13″E
- Operated by: Suzhou Rail Transit Co., Ltd
- Lines: Line 4 Line 5
- Platforms: 4 (2 island platforms)

Construction
- Structure type: Underground

History
- Opened: April 15, 2017

Services
Preceding station	Suzhou Metro	Following station
Sanyuanfang towards Longdaobang	Line 4	Renminqiao South towards Tongli
Xinshiqiao towards Taihu Xiangshan	Line 5	Nanyuanbeilu towards Yangchenghu South
Location

Nanmen (Chinese: 南门) is a station of Line 4 and Line 5 of the Suzhou Metro. The station is located in Gusu District of Suzhou. It has been in use since April 15, 2017, when Line 4 first opened.
