= Sunwu Jinianyuan station =

Suzhou Metro station

Sunwu Jinianyuan 孙武纪念园
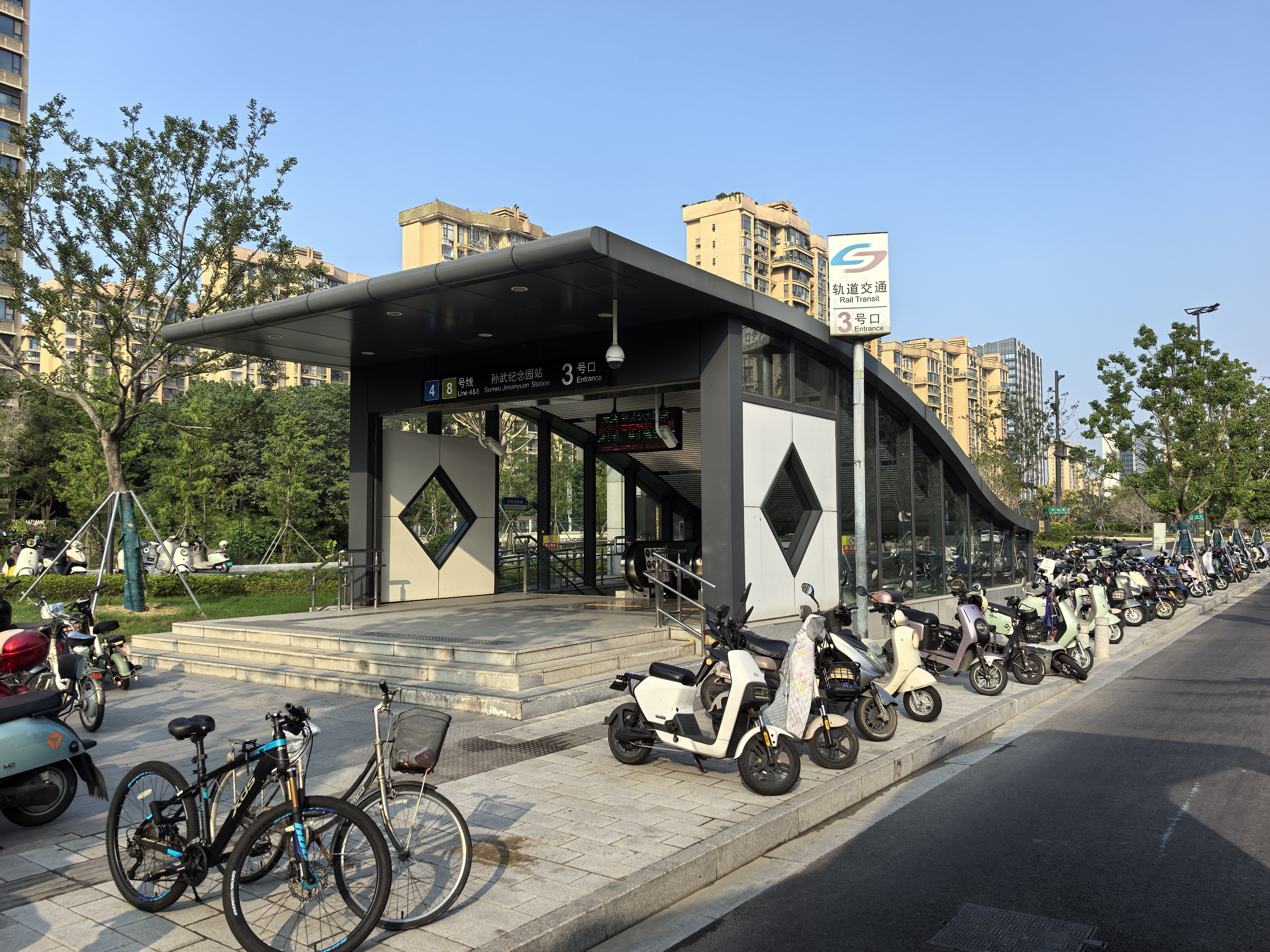

General information
- Location: Wenling Road × Yangchenghu West Road; Xiangcheng District, Suzhou, Jiangsu; China
- Coordinates: 31°21′51″N 120°35′55″E
- Operated by: Suzhou Rail Transit Co., Ltd
- Lines: Line 4 Line 8
- Platforms: 4 (2 island platform)

Construction
- Structure type: Underground

History
- Opened: April 15, 2017

Services
Preceding station	Suzhou Metro	Following station
Yaoxiang towards Longdaobang	Line 4	Pinglonglu West towards Tongli
Huqiushidigongyuan towards Xijinqiao	Line 8	Yuyao towards Chefang
Location

Sunwu Jinianyuan (Chinese: 孙武纪念园) is a station of Line 4 and Line 8 of the Suzhou Metro. The station is located in Xiangcheng District of Suzhou. It has been in use since April 15, 2017, when Line 4 first opened to the public.
