= Jiangxing Xilu station =

Suzhou Metro station

Jiangxing Xilu 江兴西路
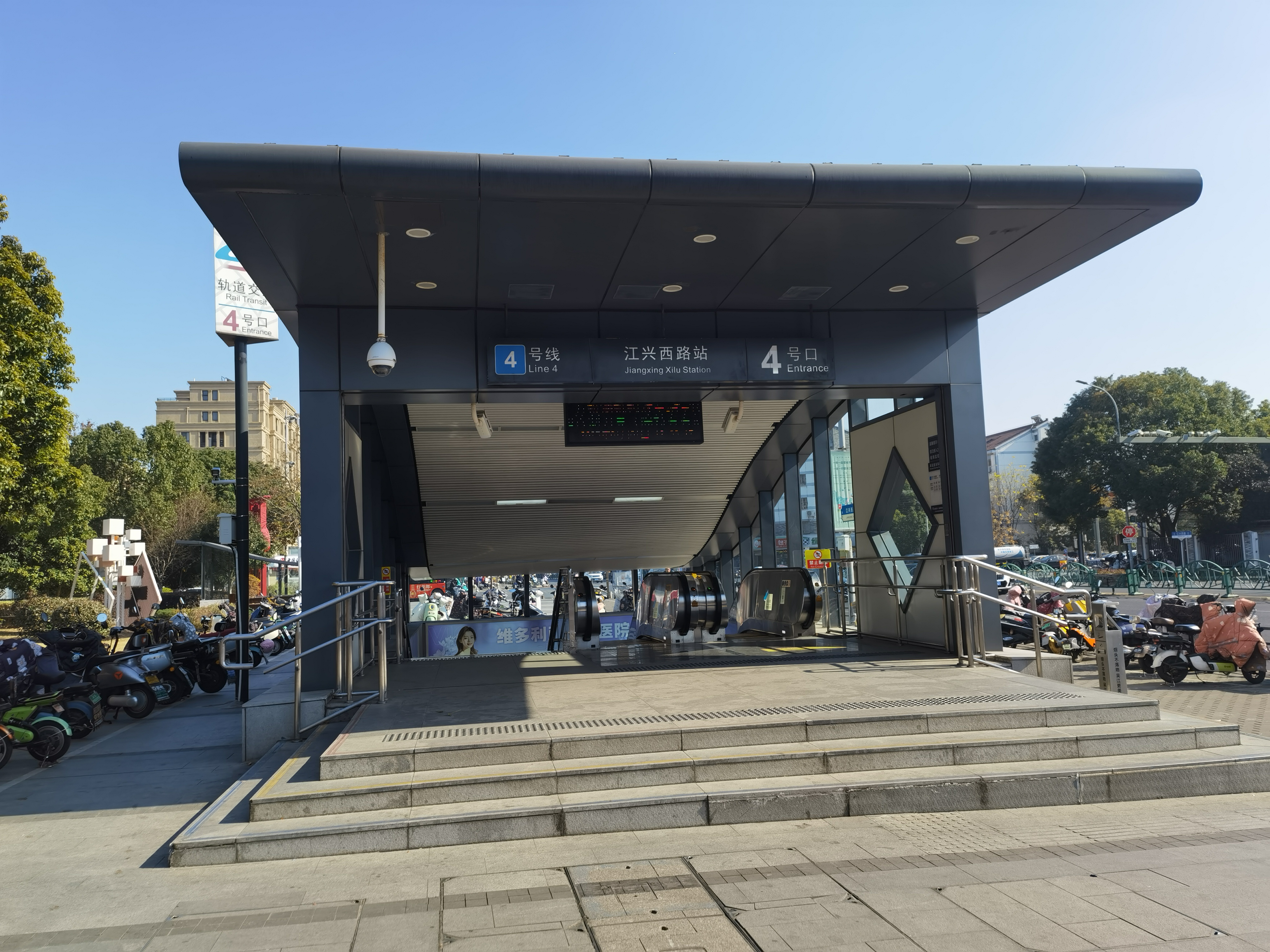

General information
- Location: Jiangxing West Road × Zhongying Avenue; Wujiang District, Suzhou, Jiangsu; China
- Coordinates: 31°10′18″N 120°37′42″E
- Operated by: Suzhou Rail Transit Co., Ltd
- Line: Line 4
- Platforms: 2 (1 island platform)

Construction
- Structure type: Underground

History
- Opened: April 15, 2017

Services
Preceding station	Suzhou Metro	Following station
Jiangling Xilu towards Longdaobang	Line 4	Liuhong Lu towards Tongli
Location

Jiangxing Xilu (Chinese: 江兴西路) is a station on Line 4 of the Suzhou Metro. The station is located in the Wujiang District of Suzhou. It has been in use since April 15, 2017, when Line 4 first opened.
