= Sujin station (Suzhou Metro) =

Metro station in Suzhou, China

Sujin 苏锦
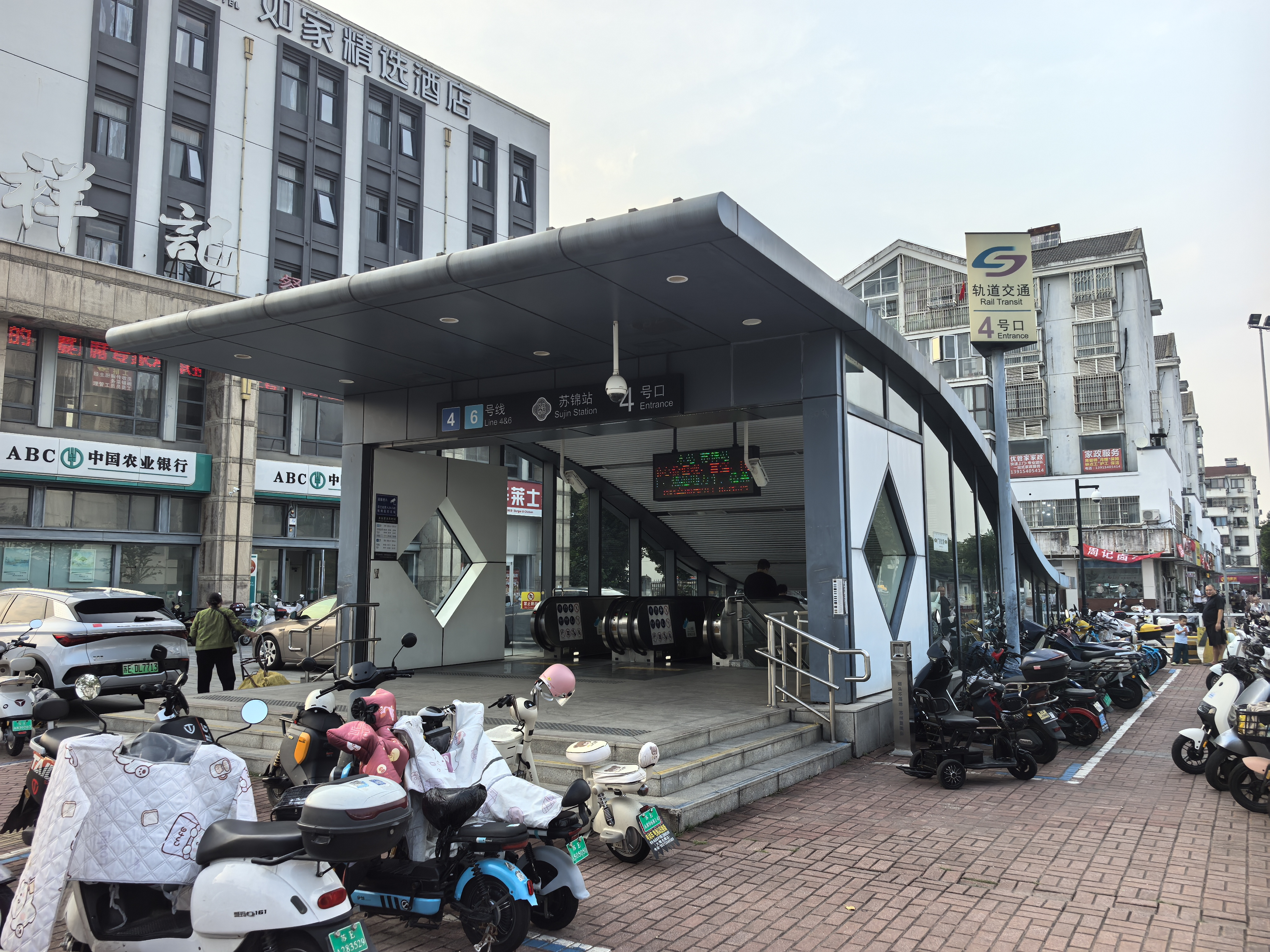

General information
- Location: Guangji North Road × Pinghe Road; Gusu District, Suzhou, Jiangsu; China
- Coordinates: 31°20′19″N 120°36′04″E
- Operated by: Suzhou Rail Transit Co., Ltd
- Lines: Line 4 Line 6
- Platforms: 4 (2 island platform)

Construction
- Structure type: Underground

History
- Opened: April 15, 2017

Services
Preceding station	Suzhou Metro	Following station
Pinglonglu West towards Longdaobang	Line 4	Suzhou Railway Station towards Tongli
Jiangxingqiao South towards Suzhou Xinqu Railway Station	Line 6	Pinghe Lu towards Sangtiandao
Location

Sujin (Chinese: 苏锦) is a station of Line 4 and Line 6 of the Suzhou Metro. The station is located in Gusu District of Suzhou. It has been in use since April 15, 2017, when Line 4 first opened.
