= Tuanjieqiao station =

Suzhou Metro station

Tuanjieqiao 团结桥
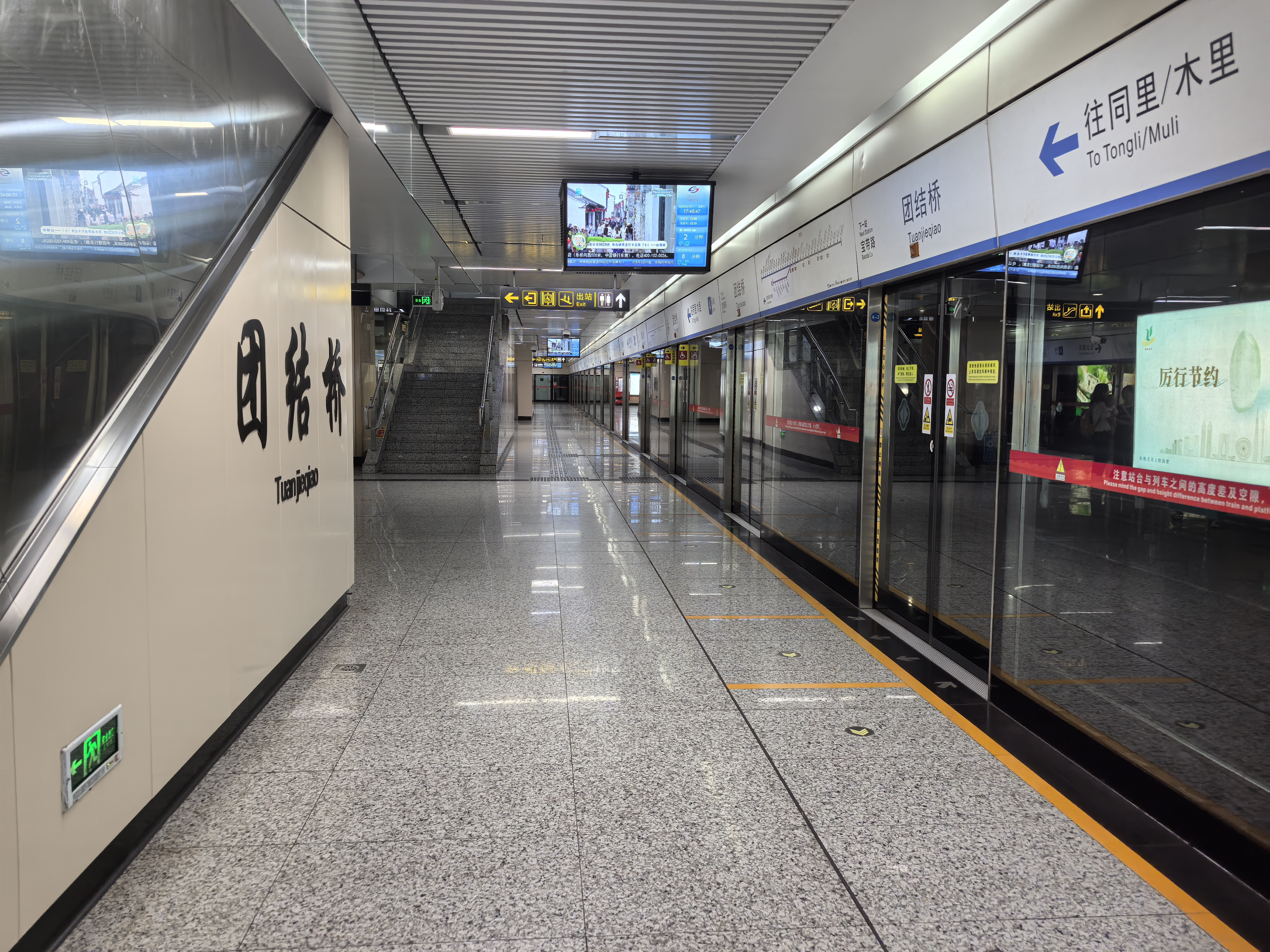
- Platform

General information
- Location: Dongwu North Road × Tuanjieqiao Alley; Gusu District/Wuzhong District, Suzhou, Jiangsu; China
- Coordinates: 31°16′43″N 120°37′22″E
- Operated by: Suzhou Rail Transit Co., Ltd
- Line: Line 4
- Platforms: 2 (1 island platform)

Construction
- Structure type: Underground

History
- Opened: April 15, 2017

Services
Preceding station	Suzhou Metro	Following station
Renminqiao South towards Longdaobang	Line 4	Baodailu towards Tongli
Location

Tuanjieqiao (Chinese: 团结桥) is a station on Line 4 of the Suzhou Metro. The station is located in Gusu District and the Wuzhong District of Suzhou. It has been in use since April 15, 2017, when Line 4 first opened.
