= Qingshuwan station =

Suzhou Metro station

Qingshuwan 清树湾
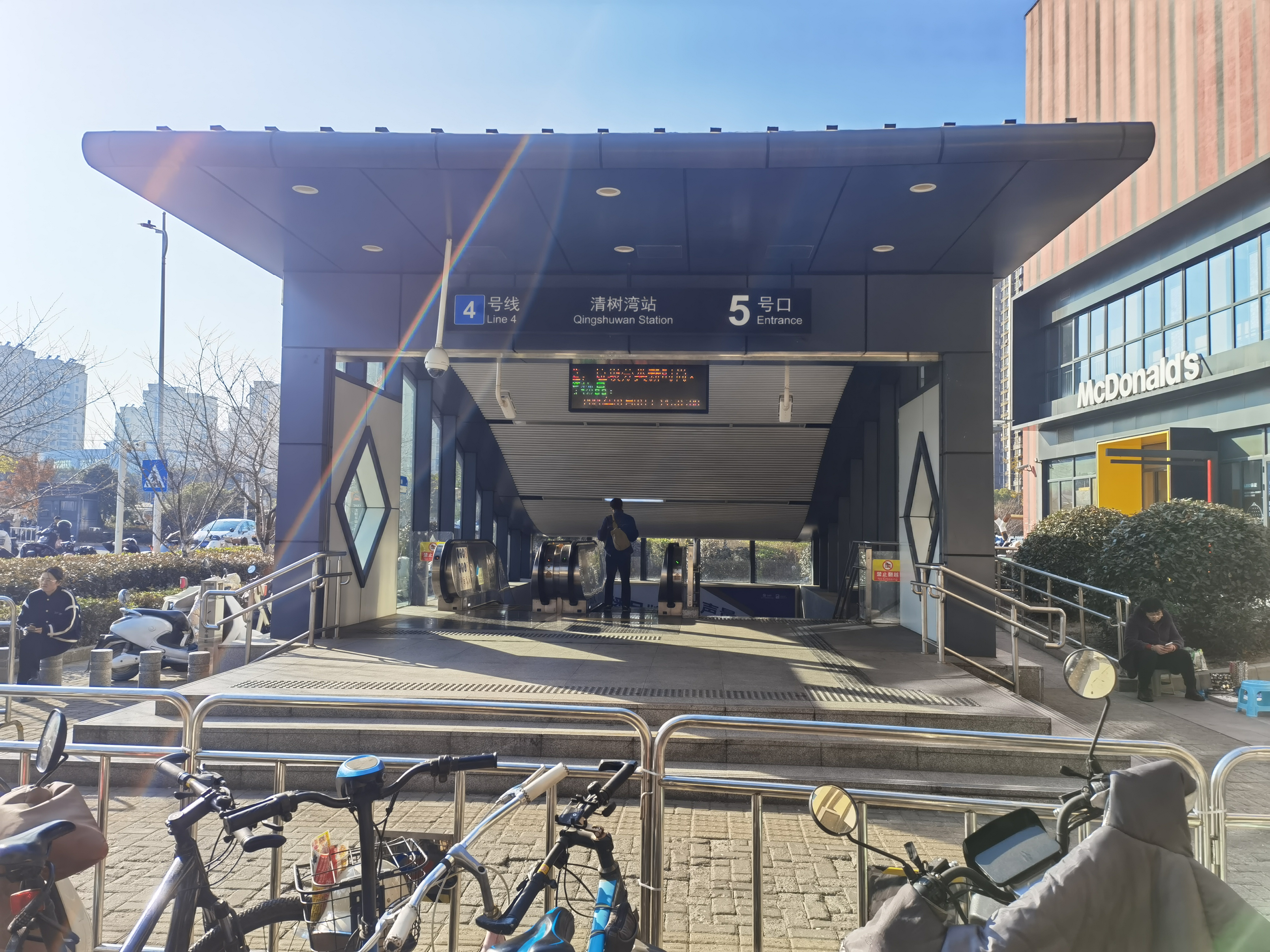

General information
- Location: Yangwan Road; Wuzhong District/Wujiang District, Suzhou, Jiangsu; China
- Coordinates: 31°13′24″N 120°37′42″E
- Operated by: Suzhou Rail Transit Co., Ltd
- Line: Line 4
- Platforms: 2 (1 island platform)

Construction
- Structure type: Underground

History
- Opened: April 15, 2017

Services
Preceding station	Suzhou Metro	Following station
Hongzhuang towards Longdaobang	Line 4	Huagang towards Tongli
Location

Qingshuwan (Chinese: 清树湾) is a station on Line 4 of the Suzhou Metro. The station is located in the Wuzhong District and the Wujiang District of Suzhou. It has been in use since April 15, 2017, when Line 4 first opened.
