= Leqiao station =

Suzhou Metro station

Leqiao 乐桥
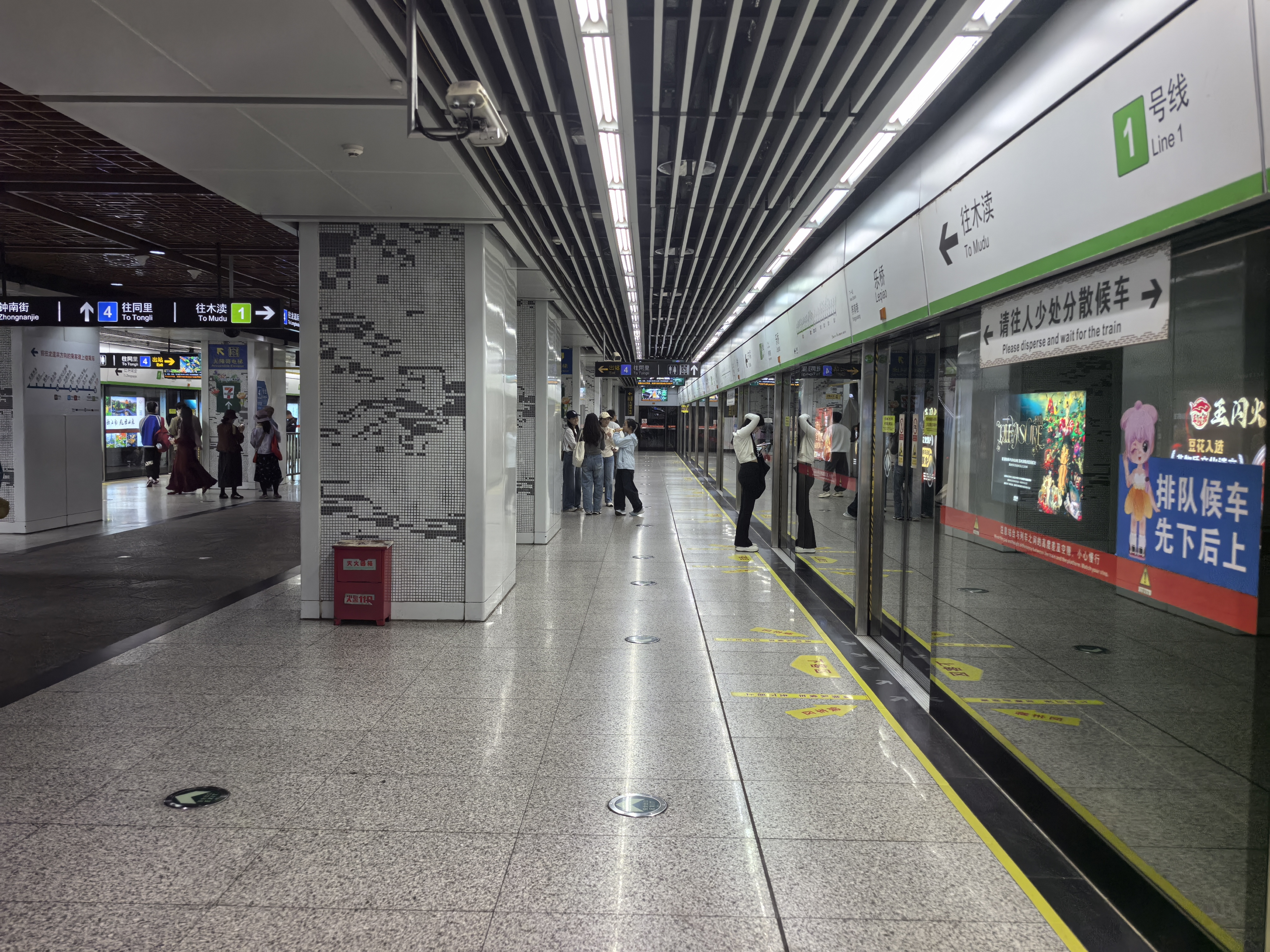
- Platform of Line 1

General information
- Location: Ganjiang West/East Road × Renmin Road; Gusu District, Suzhou, Jiangsu; China
- Coordinates: 31°18′31″N 120°37′05″E
- Operated by: Suzhou Rail Transit Co., Ltd
- Lines: Line 1 Line 4
- Platforms: 4 (1 island platform, 2 side platforms for line 4)

Construction
- Structure type: Underground

History
- Opened: April 28, 2012

Services
Preceding station	Suzhou Metro	Following station
Yangyu Xiang towards Mudu	Line 1	Lindun Lu towards Zhongnanjie
Chayuanchang towards Longdaobang	Line 4	Sanyuanfang towards Tongli
Location

Leqiao Station (Chinese: 乐桥站) is an interchange station between Line 1 and Line 4 of the Suzhou Metro. The station is located in Gusu District of Suzhou. It has been in use since April 28, 2012, when Line 1 first opened.

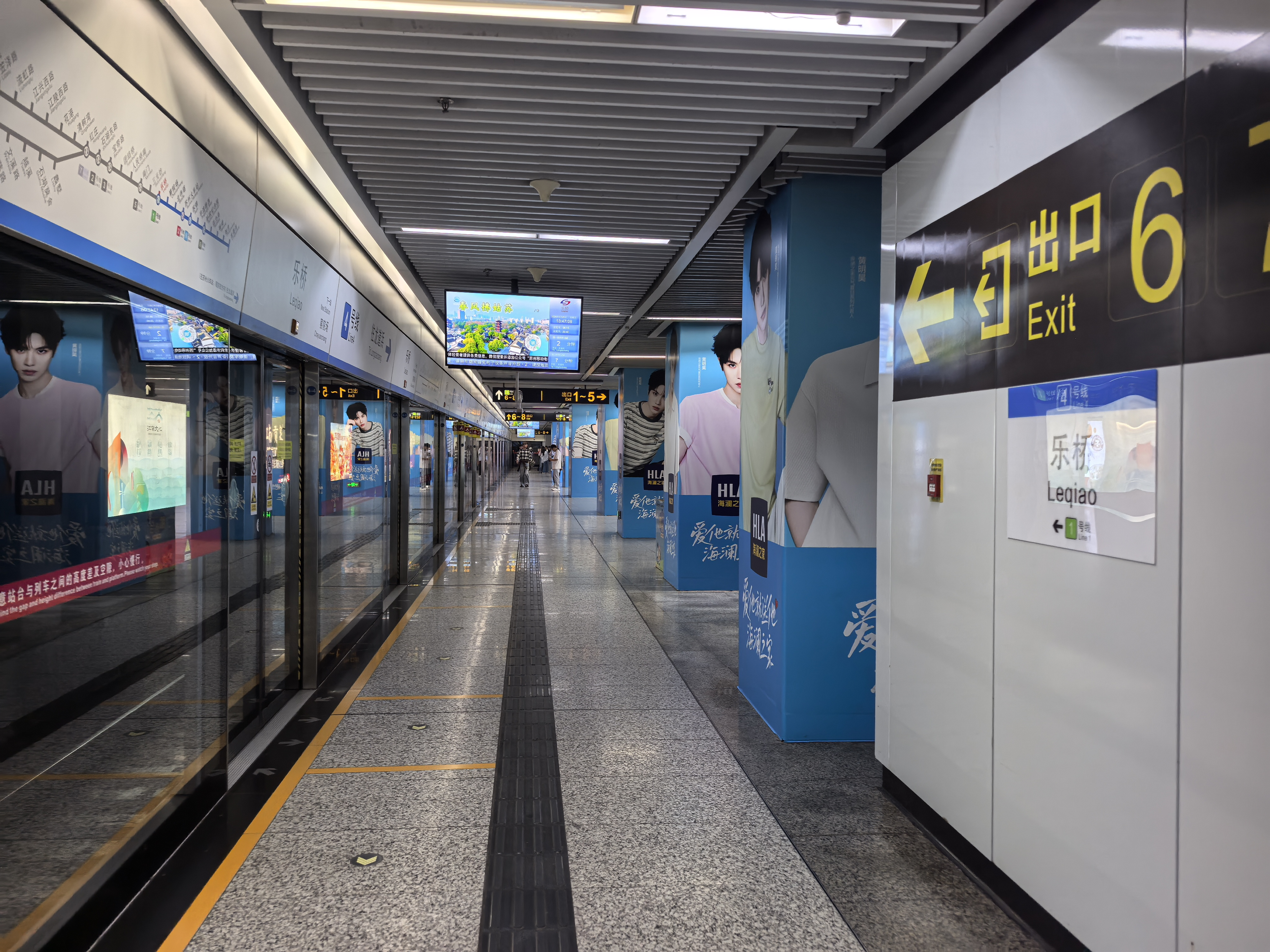
Platform of Line 4
