= Wujiang ART Demonstration Line T1 =

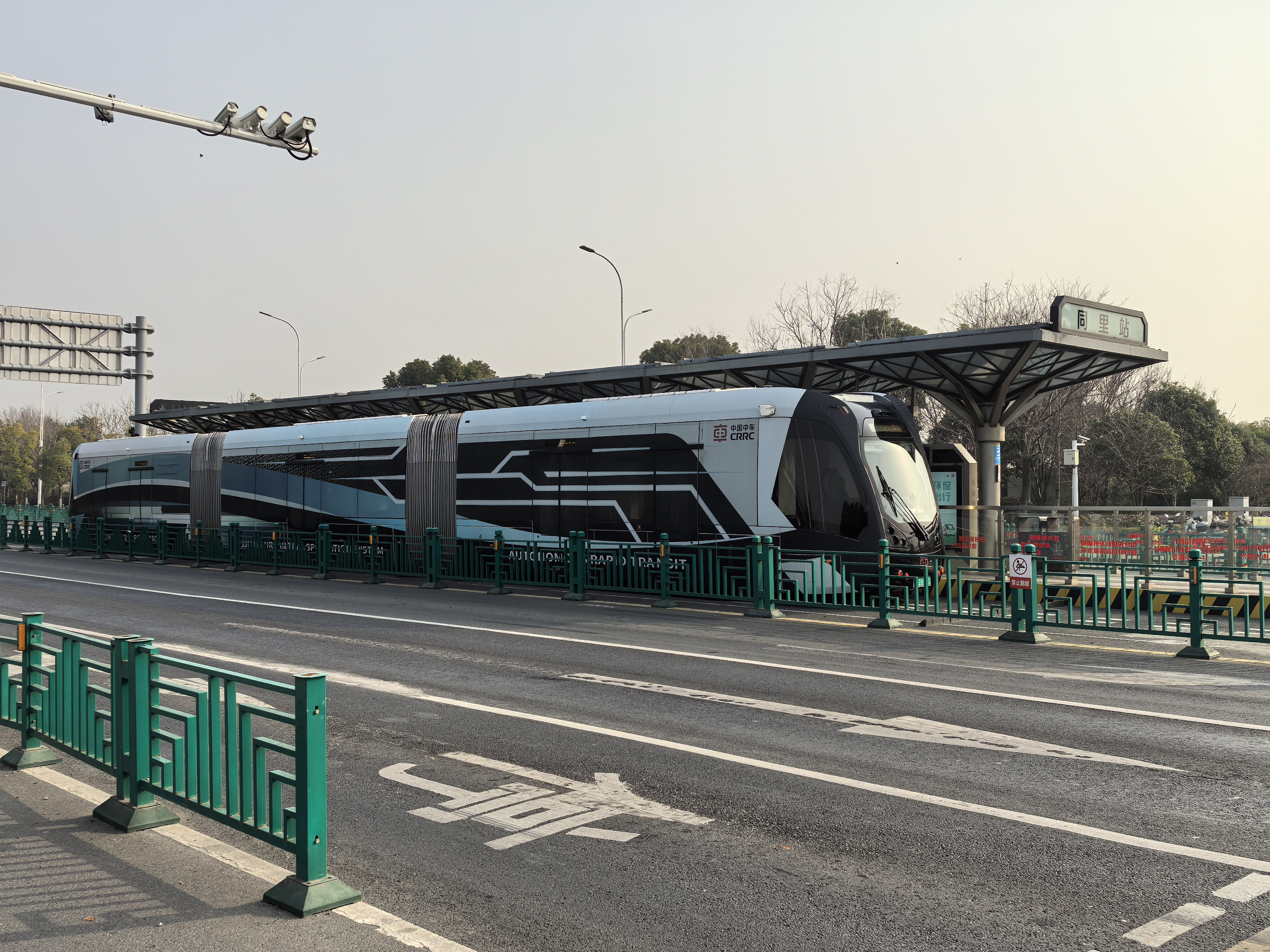
- A Wujiang ART Line T1 vehicle at Tongli station

Overview
- Status: Operational
- Line number: T1
- Locale: Wujiang District, Suzhou, Jiangsu, China
- Termini: Tongli station; Tongli Ancient Town station
- Stations: 2 (excluding 3 unopened infill stations)

Service
- Type: Autonomous Rail Rapid Transit
- System: Wujiang ART

History
- Opened: November 1, 2021

Technical
- Line length: 5.1 km (3.2 mi)
- Character: street running
- Operating speed: 70 km/h (43 mph)

Wujiang ART Demonstration Line T1 (Chinese: 吴江捷运系统T1示范线) is an Autonomous Rail Rapid Transit (ART) line in Wujiang, Suzhou, Jiangsu, China. It opened on November 1, 2021.

== Description ==
Wujiang ART Demonstration Line T1 begins at the Tongli station on Suzhou Metro line 4. From here, the line extends 5.1 kilometres (3.2 mi) along Tongjin Avenue, Yunli Road, Damiao Road, and Chongben Road, to a terminus on the northern edge of the town of Tongli. The two termini are the only operational stations on the line as of 2026, with three more infill stations planned. The line replaced the previous shuttle bus service between the metro station and the town. The line uses 3-section CRRC ART vehicles, with a maximum capacity of 307 passengers.

== List of stations ==
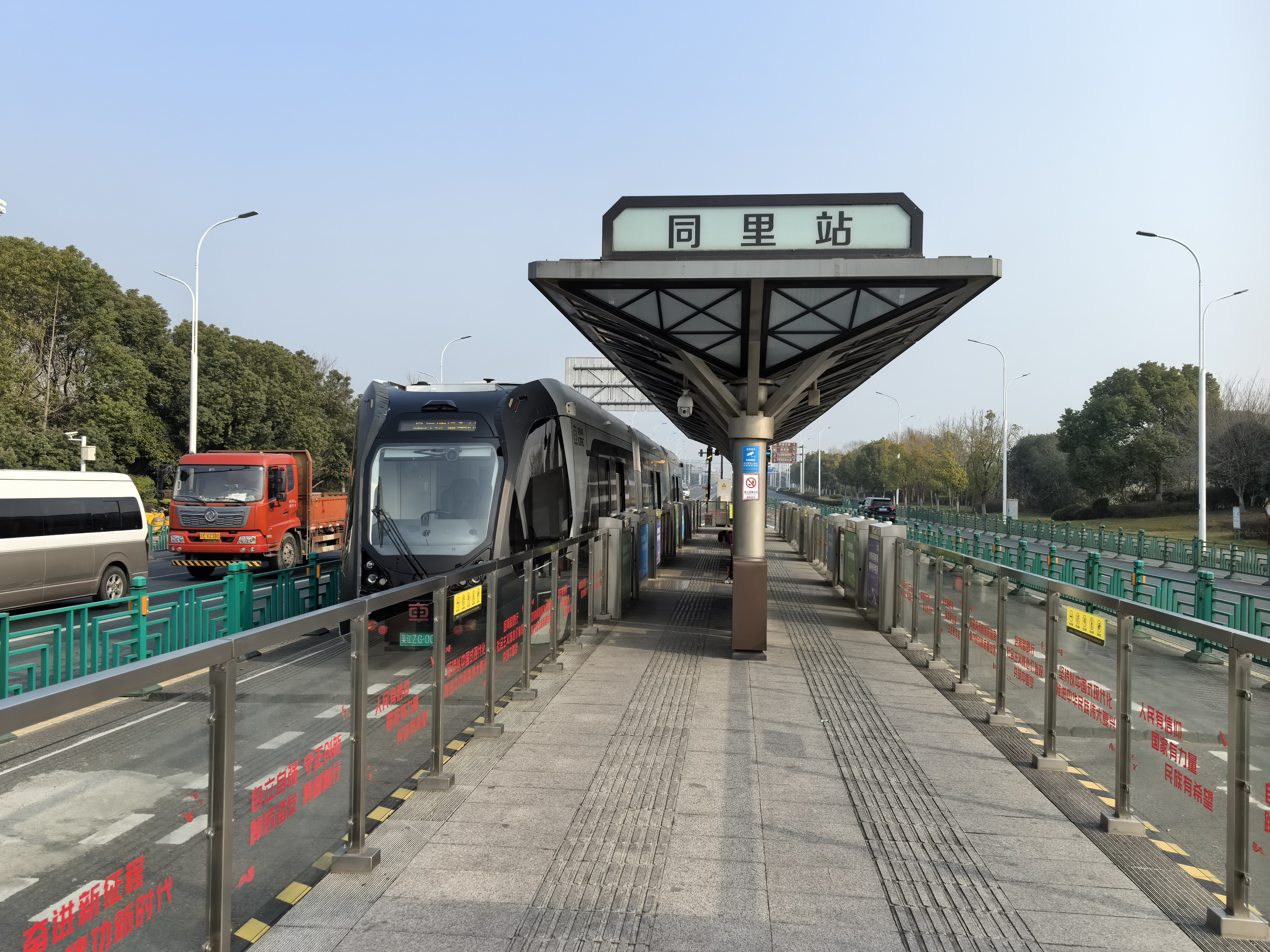
Tongli station platform

Station		Connections	Location	Opening date
English	Chinese	Connections	Location	Opening date
Tongli	同里	4	Wujiang	November 1, 2021
Huxin Donglu	湖心东路		Wujiang	Future infill
Yunli Lu	云梨路		Wujiang	Future infill
Damiao Lu	大庙路		Wujiang	Future infill
Tongli Ancient Town	同里古镇		Wujiang	November 1, 2021

== Future ==
A planned second phase extends the line south to Ludang Lake Wetland Park (Chinese: 芦荡湖湿地公园), with a 12 kilometres (7.5 mi) total route length after the extension.
