= Pangjin Lu station =

Suzhou Metro station

Pangjin Lu 庞金路
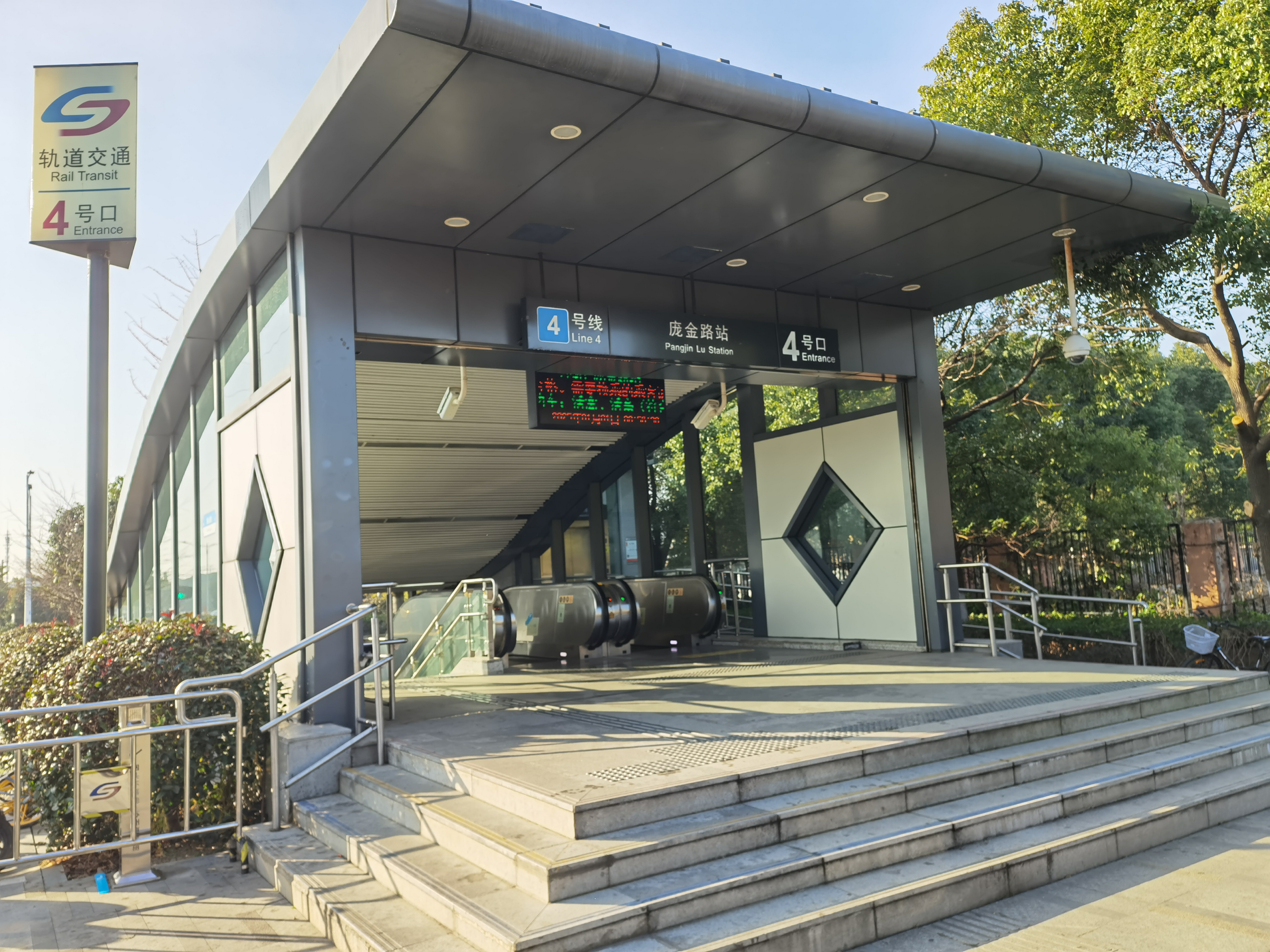

General information
- Location: Ganquan West Road × Pangjin Road; Wujiang District, Suzhou, Jiangsu; China
- Coordinates: 31°08′23″N 120°40′31″E
- Operated by: Suzhou Rail Transit Co., Ltd
- Line: Line 4
- Platforms: 2 (1 island platform)

Construction
- Structure type: Underground

History
- Opened: April 15, 2017

Services
| Preceding station | Suzhou Metro | Following station |
|---|---|---|
| Wujiang Coach Station towards Longdaobang | Line 4 | Tongli Terminus |
Location

Pangjin Lu (Chinese: 庞金路) is a station on Line 4 of the Suzhou Metro. The station is located in the Wujiang District of Suzhou. It has been in use since April 15, 2017, when Line 4 first opened.
