= Zhangzhuang station =

Suzhou Metro station

Zhangzhuang 张庄
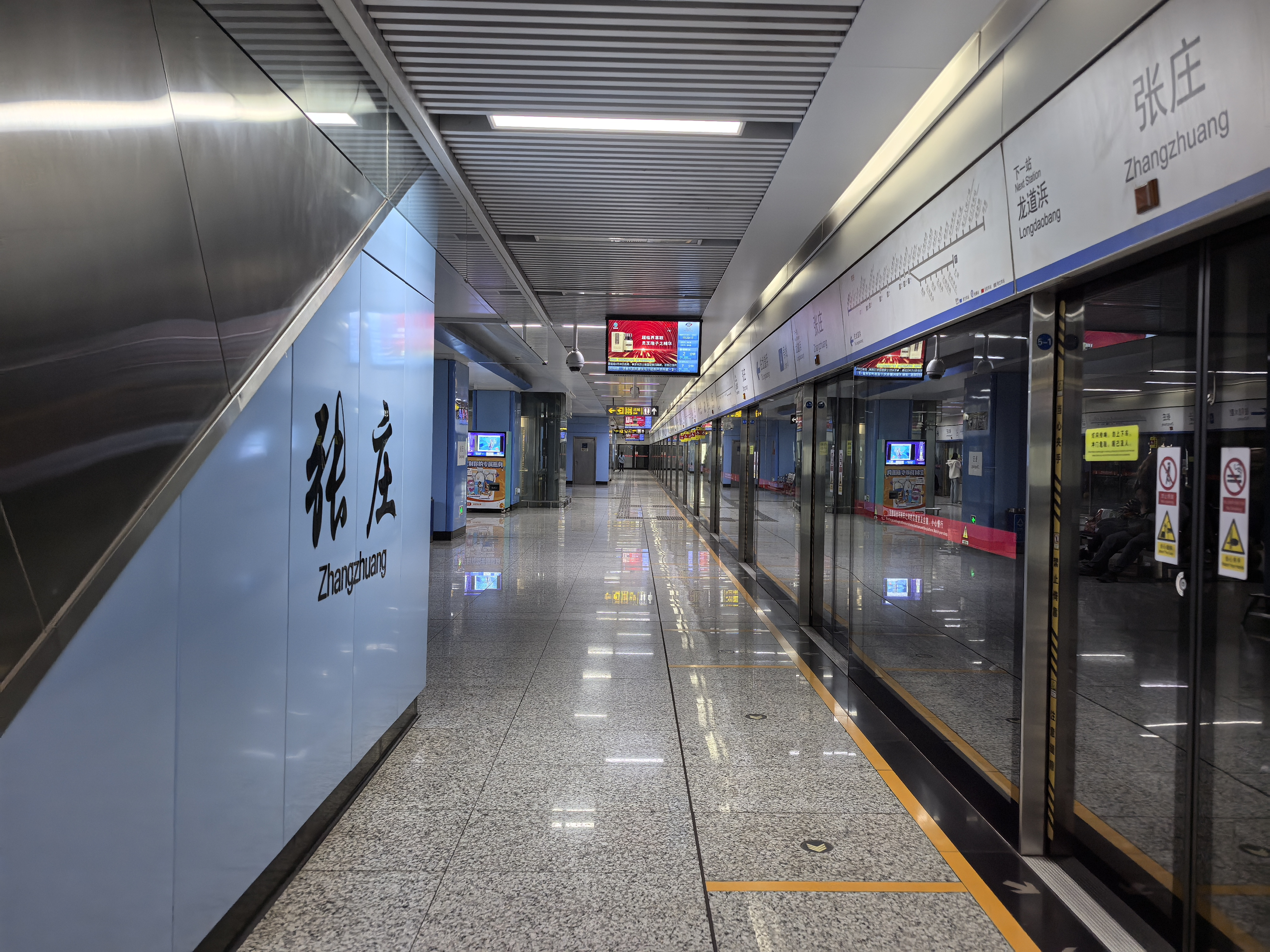

General information
- Location: Wenling Road; Xiangcheng District, Suzhou, Jiangsu; China
- Coordinates: 31°23′58″N 120°35′37″E
- Operated by: Suzhou Rail Transit Co., Ltd
- Line: Line 4
- Platforms: 2 (1 island platform)

Construction
- Structure type: Underground

History
- Opened: April 15, 2017

Services
Preceding station	Suzhou Metro	Following station
Longdaobang Terminus	Line 4	Yaoxiang towards Tongli
Location

Zhangzhuang Station (Chinese: 张庄) is a station of is a station on Line 4 of the Suzhou Metro. The station is located in Xiangcheng District of Suzhou. It has been in use since April 15, 2017, when Line 4 first opened.
