= Line 4 (Suzhou Metro) =

Metro line in Suzhou, Jiangsu, China

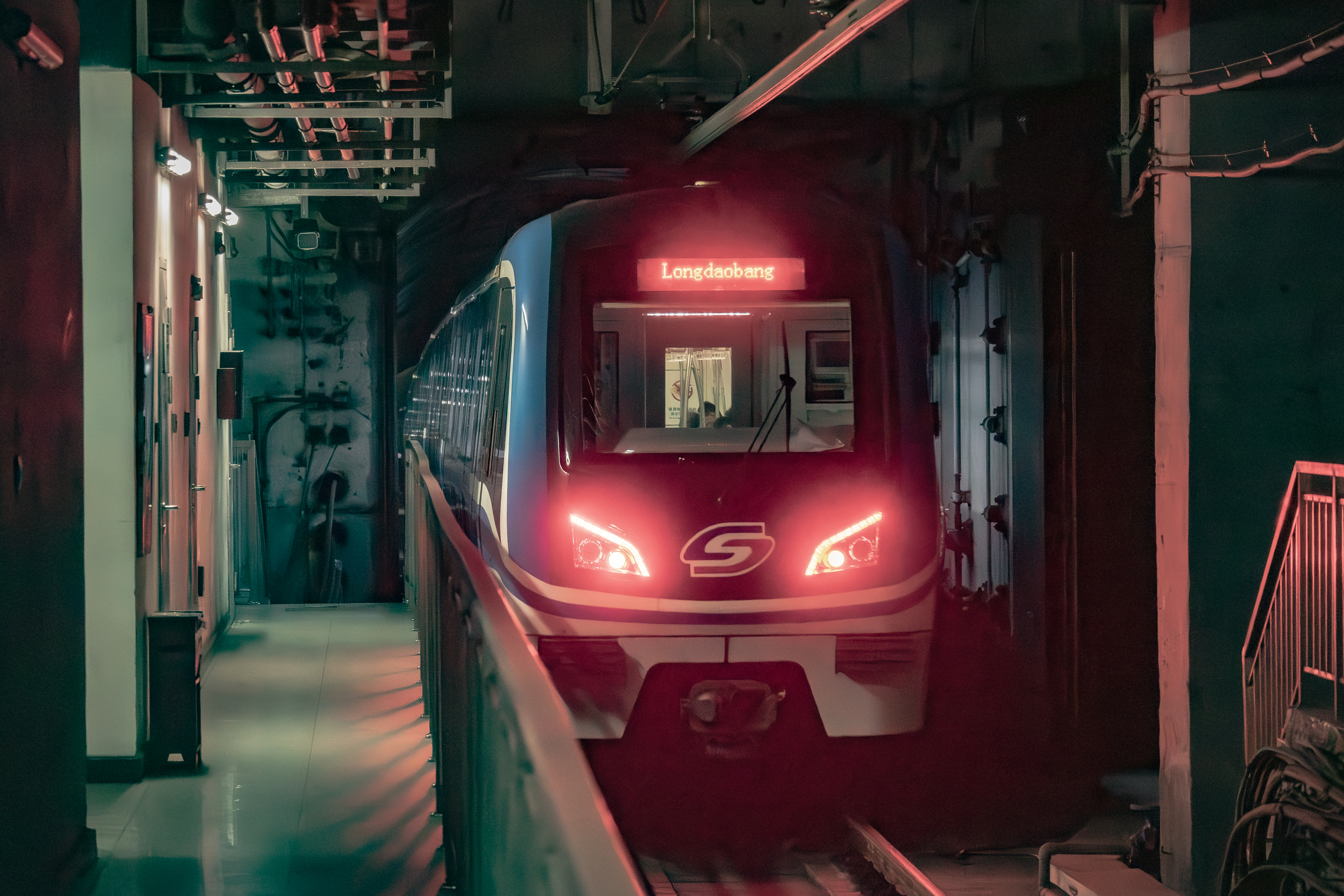
- A train of Suzhou Metro Line 4

Overview
- Native name: 苏州地铁4号线
- Status: In operation
- Owner: Suzhou Rail Transit Co., Ltd
- Termini: Longdaobang; Tongli
- Stations: 31

Service
- Type: Rapid transit
- System: Suzhou Metro
- Operator(s): Suzhou Rail Transit Co., Ltd

History
- Opened: 15 April 2017; 9 years ago

Technical
- Line length: 41.5 km (25.8 mi)
- Track gauge: 1,435 mm (4 ft 8 1/2 in)

Line 4 is a line of the Suzhou Metro. It runs in a north–south alignment from Longdaobang station in Xiangcheng District's the northern suburbs, to the canal town of Tongli in Wujiang District in the south. The line is 41.5 km long with 31 stations.

Until October 2024 there was an 11.3 km long branch line with 7 stations. This branch line was later transferred to line 7.

== History ==
Groundbreaking occurred on December 31, 2010 in Wujiang, and the line was constructed between 2012 and 2016. Operations started on April 15, 2017.

=== Opening timeline ===
Segment	Commencement	Length	Station(s)	Name
Longdaobang — Tongli	April 15, 2017	41.5 km (25.79 mi)	31	Phase 1

== Stations ==
Station name		Connections	Distance km		Location
English	Chinese	Connections	Distance km		Location
Longdaobang	龙道浜		0.00	0.00	Xiangcheng
Zhangzhuang	张庄		1.29	1.29	Xiangcheng
Yaoxiang	姚祥		0.83	2.12	Xiangcheng
Huolidao	活力岛		1.68	3.80	Xiangcheng
Sunwu Jinianyuan	孙武纪念园	8	1.44	5.24	Xiangcheng
Pinglonglu West	平泷路西		1.85	7.09	Gusu
Sujin	苏锦	6	1.09	8.18	Gusu
Suzhou Railway Station	苏州火车站	2 SZH	0.97	9.15	Gusu
Beisita	北寺塔	9	1.45	10.60	Gusu
Chayuanchang	察院场		0.95	11.55	Gusu
Leqiao	乐桥	1	0.54	12.09	Gusu
Sanyuanfang	三元坊		1.01	13.10	Gusu
Nanmen	南门	5	0.79	13.89	Gusu
Renminqiao South	人民桥南		0.67	14.56	Gusu
Tuanjieqiao	团结桥		1.00	15.56	Wuzhong
Baodailu	宝带路	3	0.98	16.54	Wuzhong
Shihu Donglu	石湖东路	2	1.60	18.14	Wuzhong
Hongzhuang	红庄	7	1.90	20.04	Wuzhong
Qingshuwan	清树湾		1.68	21.72	Wujiang
Huagang	花港		2.04	23.76	Wujiang
Jiangling Xilu	江陵西路		2.94	26.70	Wujiang
Jiangxing Xilu	江兴西路		1.39	28.09	Wujiang
Liuhong Lu	流虹路		1.75	29.84	Wujiang
Lize Lu	笠泽路		0.81	30.65	Wujiang
Gujiadang	顾家荡	14	1.16	31.81	Wujiang
Suzhouwan East	苏州湾东		1.00	32.81	Wujiang
Songling Dadao	松陵大道		1.12	33.93	Wujiang
Wujiang Renmin Guangchang	吴江人民广场		1.89	35.82	Wujiang
Wujiang Coach Station	吴江汽车站		1.83	37.65	Wujiang
Pangjin Lu	庞金路		1.73	39.38	Wujiang
Tongli	同里		1.89	41.27	Wujiang

== Rolling stock ==
Trains are run in six-car formations, and have a maximum speed of 80 km/h.

Fleet numbers	Year built	Time in service	Builder	Class	Number in service	No of car	Assembly	Rolling stock	Number	Depots	Line assigned	Notes
240 (40 sets)	2015-2017	2017-present	CSR Nanjing Puzhen	B	240 (40 sets)	6	Tc+Mp+M - M + Mp+Tc	PM081	040101-044006 (0401-0440)	Songling Depot; Yuanhe Yard; Tian'Edang Yard	4	
60 (10 sets)	2023-2024	2024-present	CRRC Nanjing Puzhen	B	60 (10 sets)	6	Tc+Mp+M - M + Mp+Tc	PM254	044101-045006 (0441-0450)	Songling Depot; Yuanhe Yard; Tian'Edang Yard	4	
