= Tongli station =

Metro station in Suzhou, China

Tongli 同里
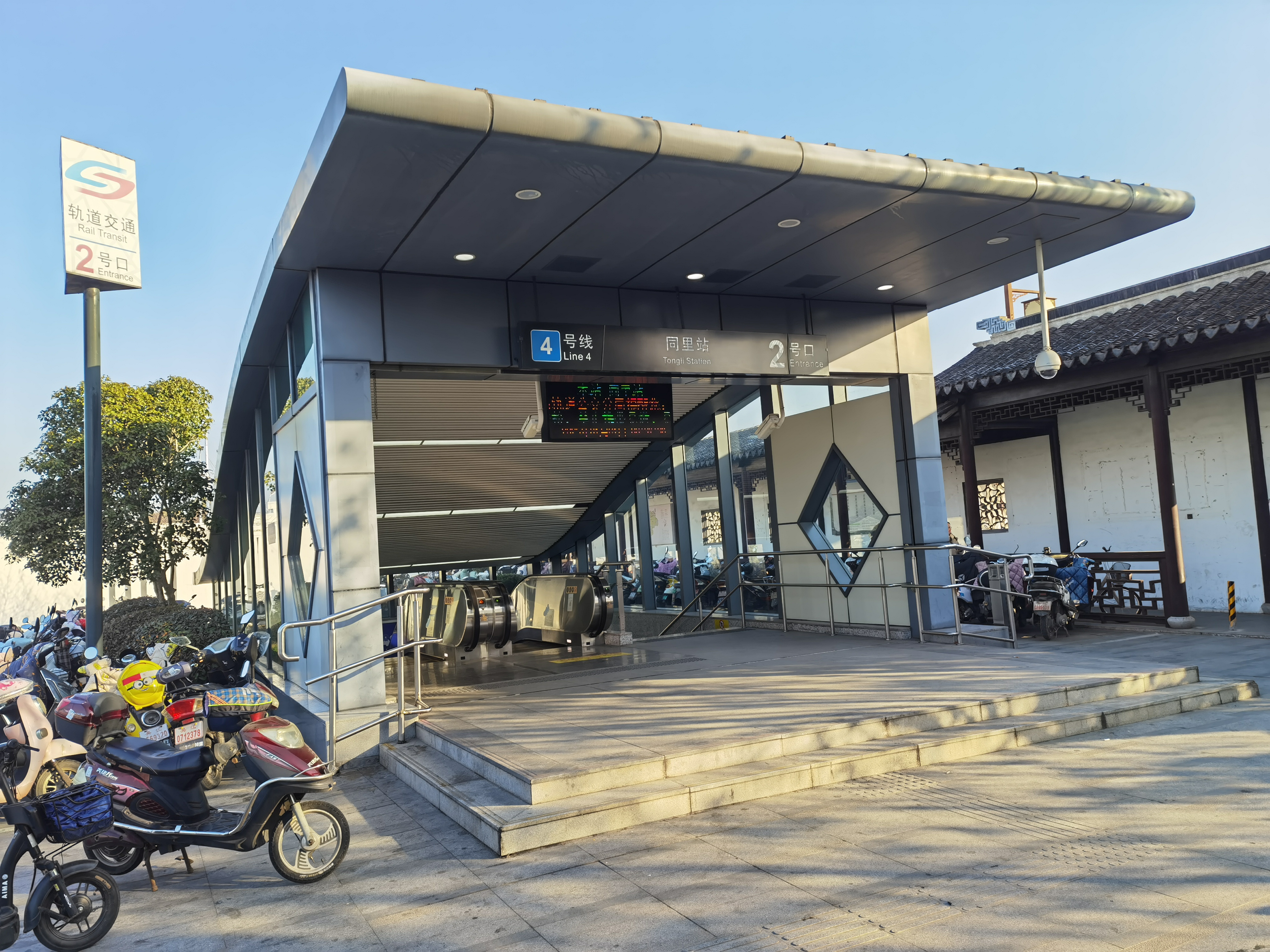

General information
- Location: Ganquan East Road × Tongjin Avenue; Wujiang District, Suzhou, Jiangsu; China
- Coordinates: 31°08′22″N 120°41′46″E
- Operated by: Suzhou Rail Transit Co., Ltd
- Line: Line 4
- Platforms: 2 (1 island platform)
- Connections: Wujiang ART Demonstration Line T1

Construction
- Structure type: Underground

History
- Opened: April 15, 2017

Services
Preceding station	Suzhou Metro	Following station
Pangjin Lu towards Longdaobang	Line 4	Terminus
Location

Tongli (Chinese: 同里) is a station on Line 4 of the Suzhou Metro, and the southern terminus of Line 4. The station is located in the Wujiang District of Suzhou. It has been in use since April 15, 2017, the same time of the operation of Line 4.
