= Longdaobang station =

Suzhou Metro station

Longdaobang 龙道浜
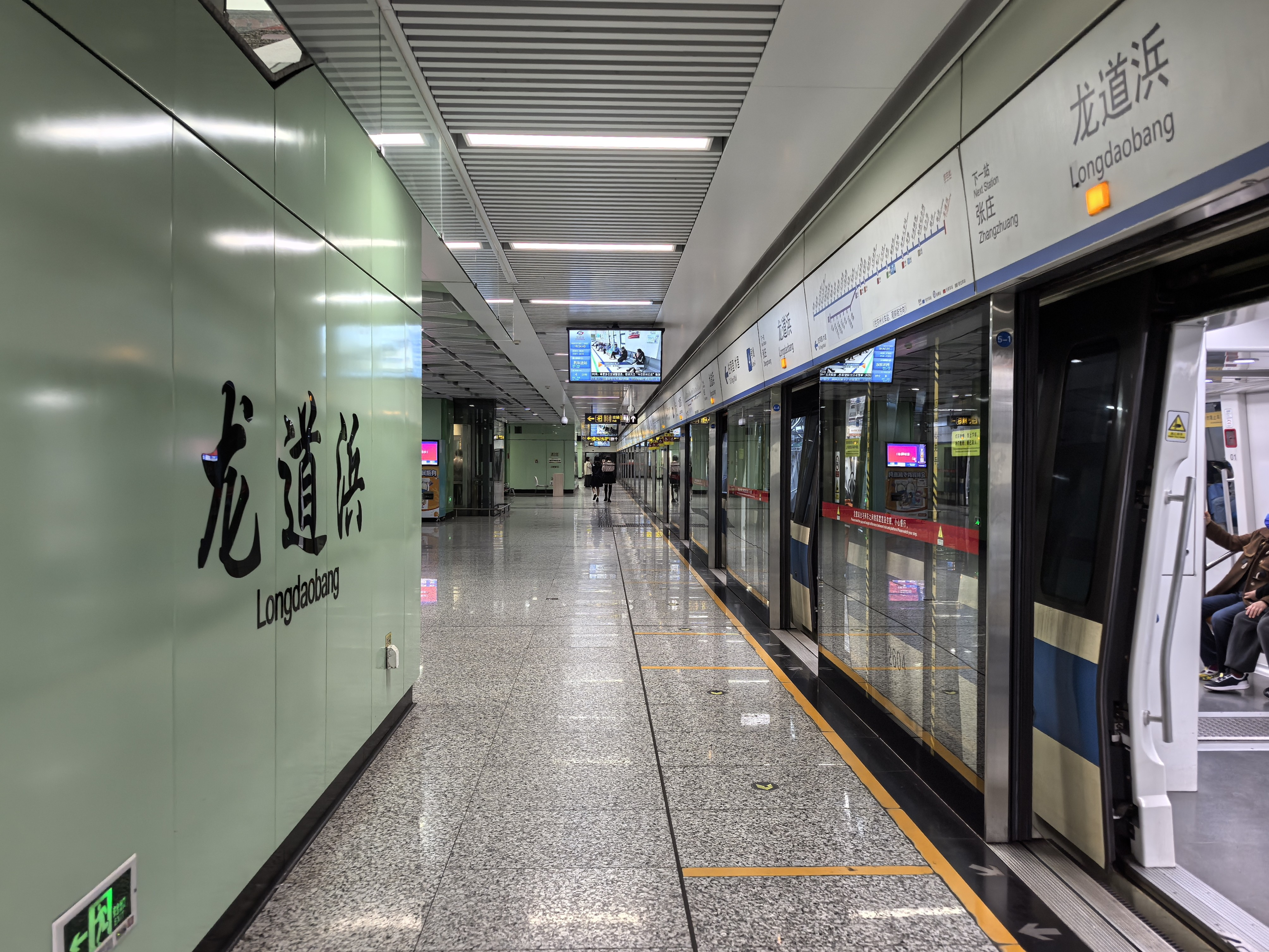

General information
- Location: Jinzhuan Road; Xiangcheng District, Suzhou, Jiangsu; China
- Coordinates: 31°24′19″N 120°36′02″E
- Operated by: Suzhou Rail Transit Co., Ltd
- Line: Line 4
- Platforms: 2 (1 island platform)

Construction
- Structure type: Underground

History
- Opened: April 15, 2017

Services
Preceding station	Suzhou Metro	Following station
Terminus	Line 4	Zhangzhuang towards Tongli
Location

Longdaobang Station (Chinese: 龙道浜) is a station on Line 4 of the Suzhou Metro, and the northern terminus of Line 4. The station is located in Xiangcheng District of Suzhou. It has been in use since April 15, 2017, when Line 4 first opened.
