= Tangzhuang station =

Suzhou Metro station

Tangzhuang 唐庄
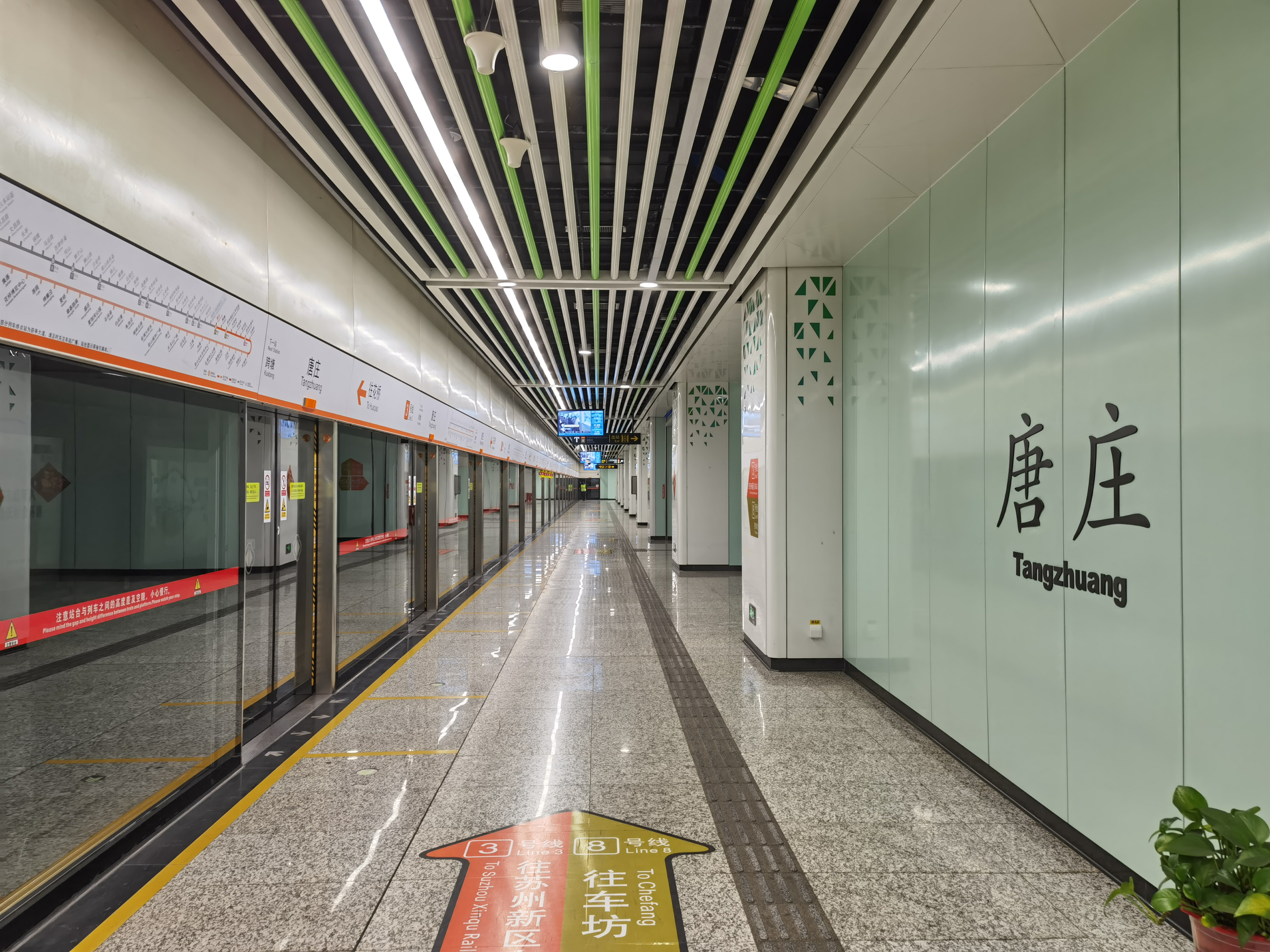
- Platform for Line 3 towards Huaqiao

General information
- Location: Xinggang Street (星港街) & Fengting Avenue (葑亭大道) × Lujing Road (陆泾路); Suzhou Industrial Park, Suzhou, Jiangsu; China
- Coordinates: 31°20′34″N 120°40′49″E
- Operated by: Suzhou Rail Transit Co., Ltd
- Lines: Line 3 Line 8
- Platforms: 4 (2 island platform)

Construction
- Structure type: Underground

History
- Opened: December 25, 2019

Services
Preceding station	Suzhou Metro	Following station
Nibang towards Suzhou Xinqu Railway Station	Line 3	Kuatang towards Weiting
Nanzezhuang towards Xijinqiao	Line 8	Gulou towards Chefang
Location

Tangzhuang Station (Chinese: 唐庄) is a station of Line 3 and Line 8 of the Suzhou Metro. The station is located in Suzhou Industrial Park, Jiangsu. It has been in use since December 25, 2019, when Line 3 first opened to the public. It acts as one of three interchanges between the two lines.

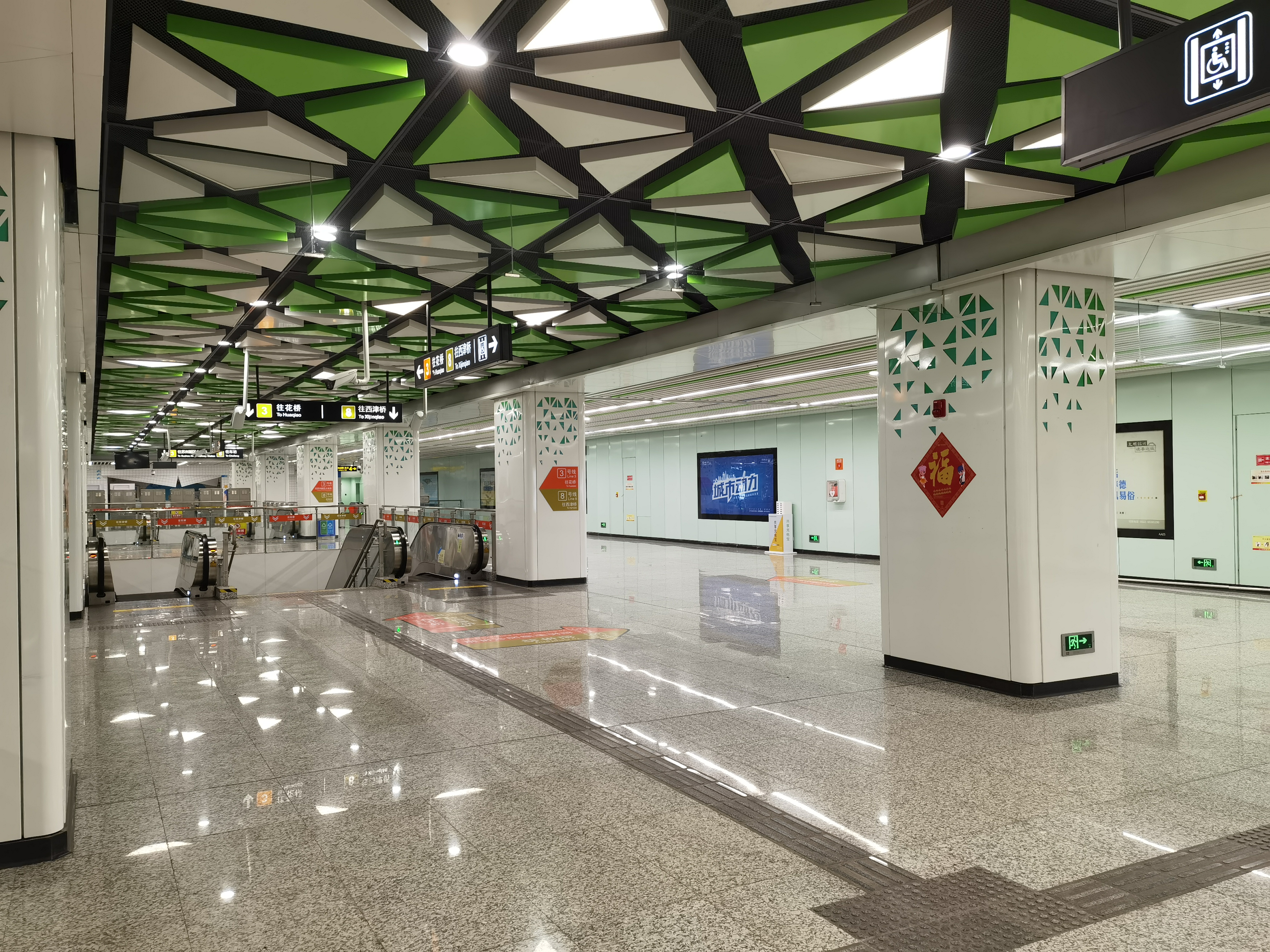
Concourse

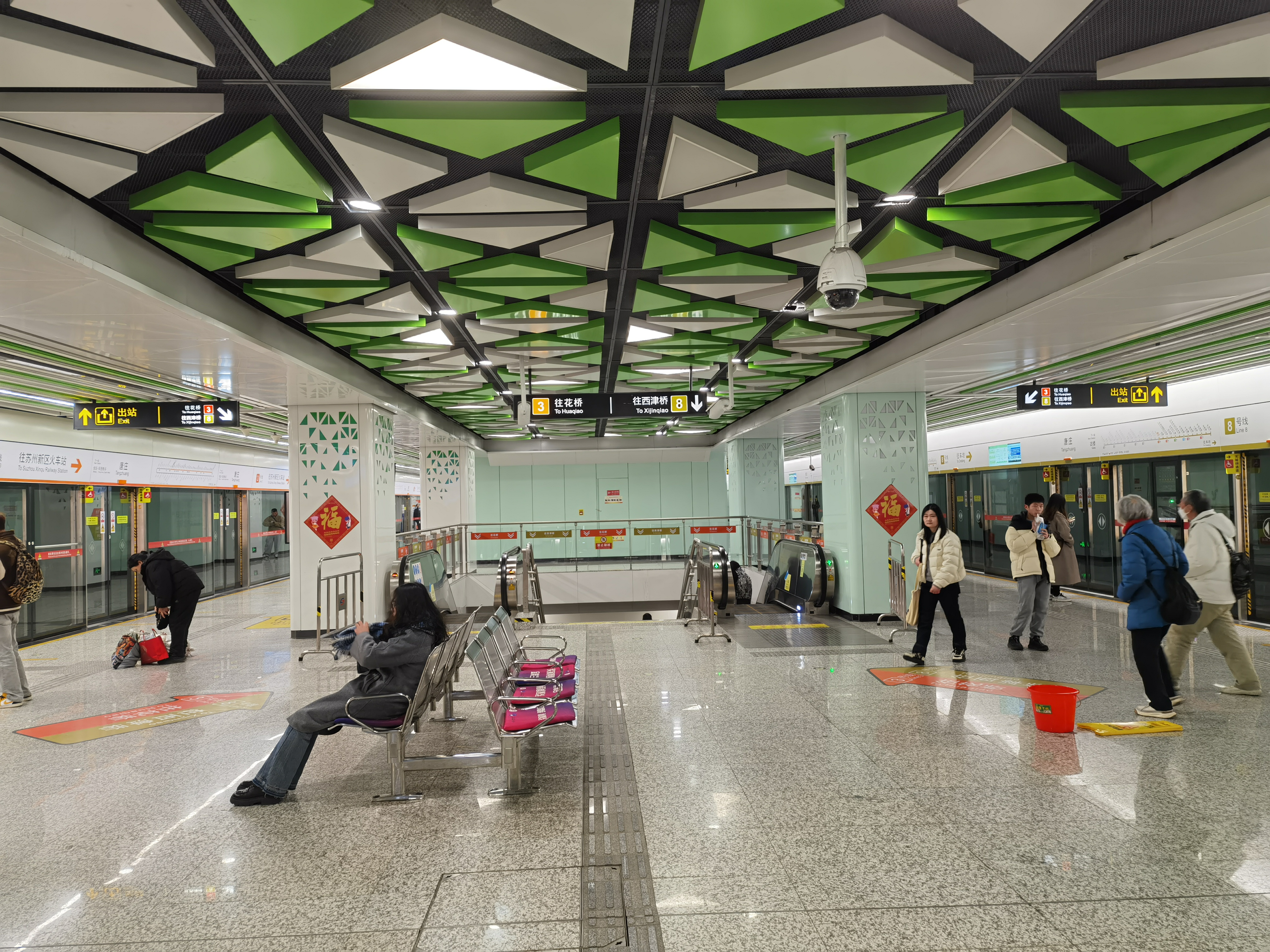
B2F platform

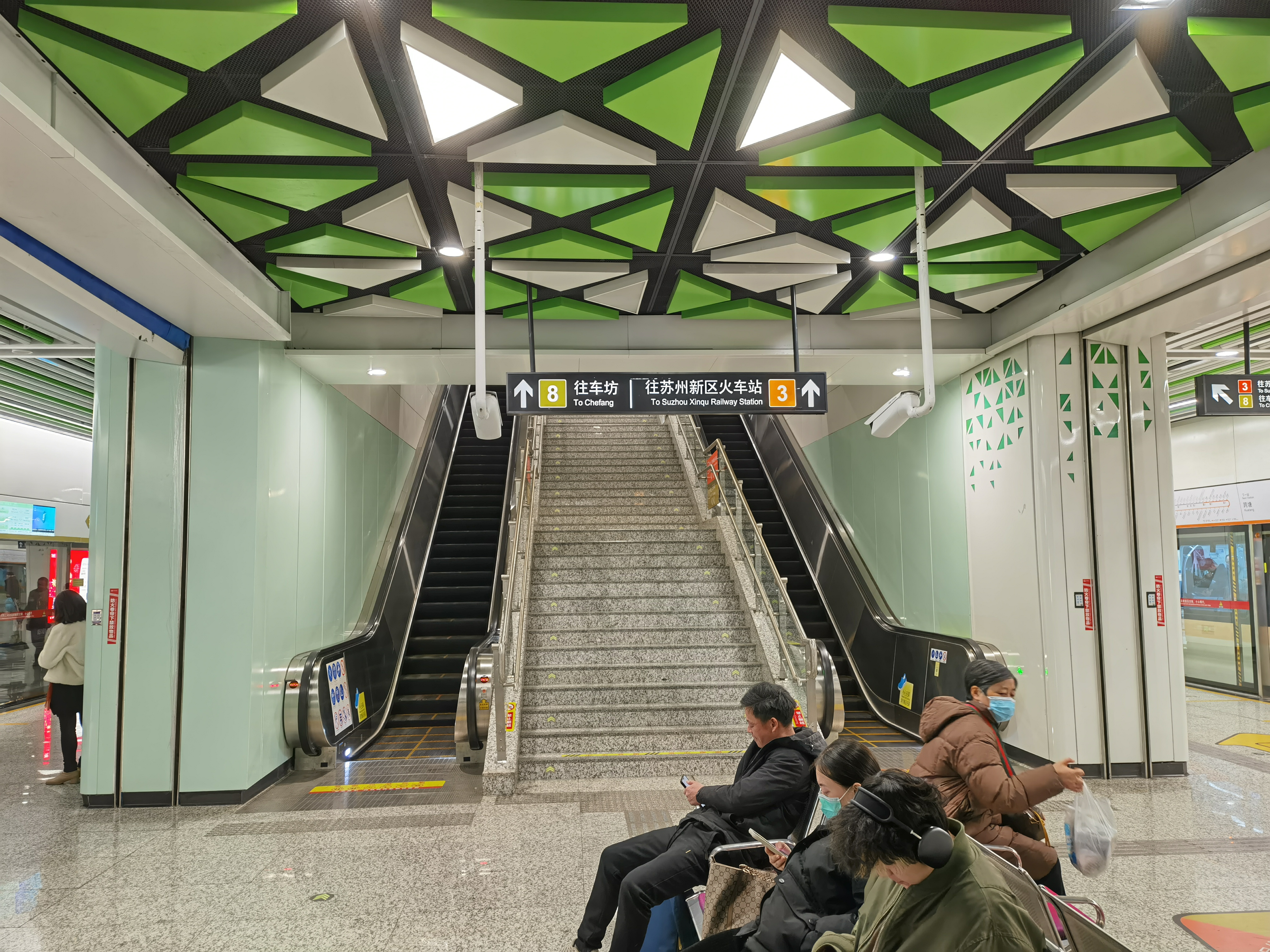
B3F platform
