= Yangchenghuzhonglu station =

Suzhou Metro station

Coordinates: 31°22′07″N 120°37′22″E

Yangchenghuzhonglu 阳澄湖中路
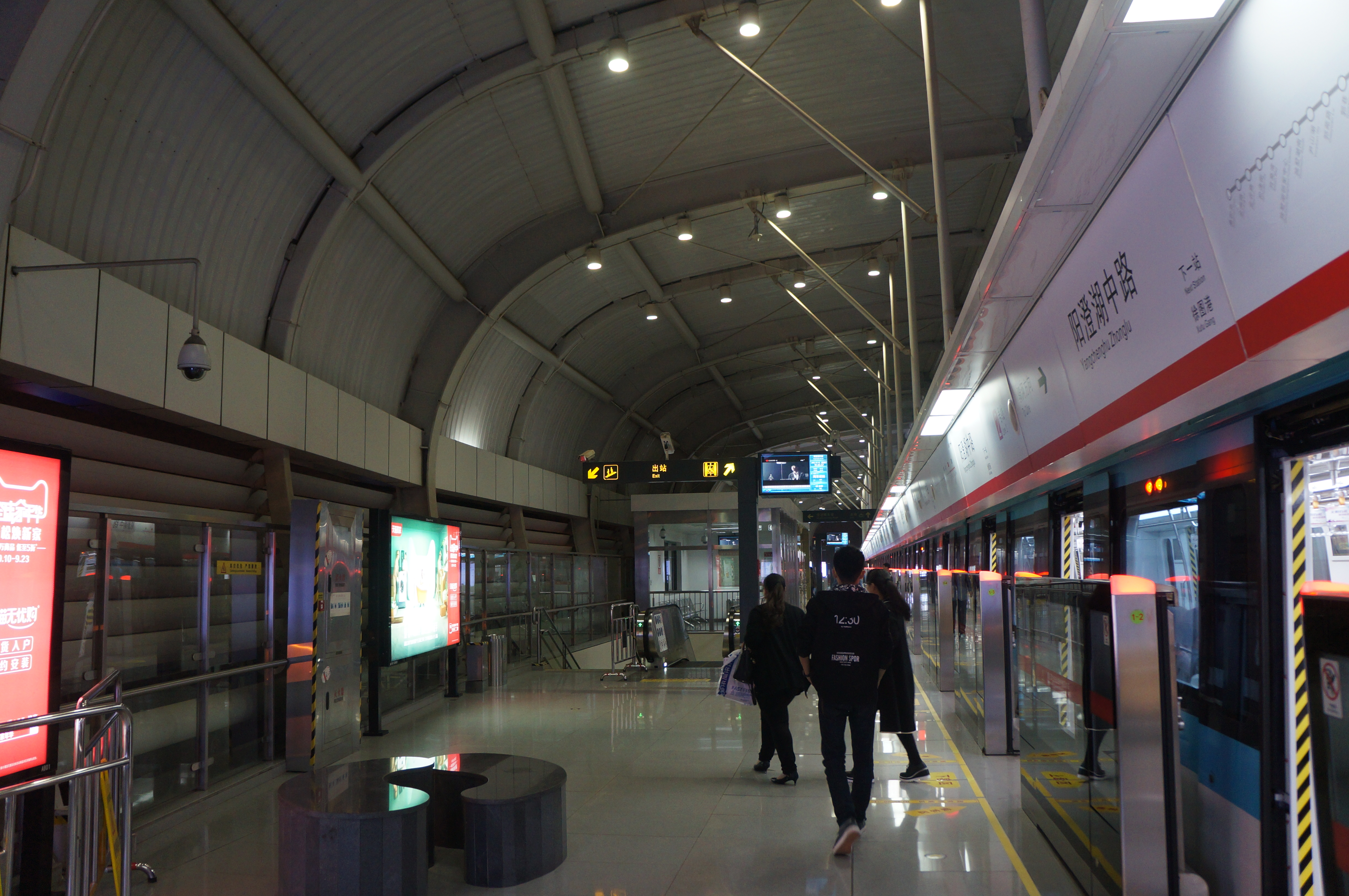
- Line 2 platform

General information
- Location: Xiangcheng District, Suzhou, Jiangsu; China
- Operated by: Suzhou Rail Transit Co., Ltd
- Lines: Line 2 Line 8
- Platforms: 4 (4 side platforms)

Construction
- Structure type: Elevated (Line 2); Underground (Line 8)

History
- Opened: December 28, 2013 (Line 2); September 10, 2024 (Line 8)

Services
Preceding station	Suzhou Metro	Following station
Xutu Gang towards Qihe	Line 2	Lumu towards Sangtiandao
Lumu Guxiang towards Xijinqiao	Line 8	Xiawei towards Chefang
Location

Yangchenghuzhonglu station (Chinese: 阳澄湖中路站; pinyin: Yángchénghúzhōnglù zhàn; lit. 'Yangcheng Lake Middle Road station') is a station of Line 2 and Line 8 of the Suzhou Metro. The station for Line 2 is elevated, and the station for Line 8 is underground.

The station is located in Xiangcheng District of Suzhou. It started service on December 28, 2013, when Line 2 first opened.
