= Songtaojie station =

Suzhou Metro station

Coordinates: 31°15′59″N 120°44′11″E

Songtaojie 松涛街
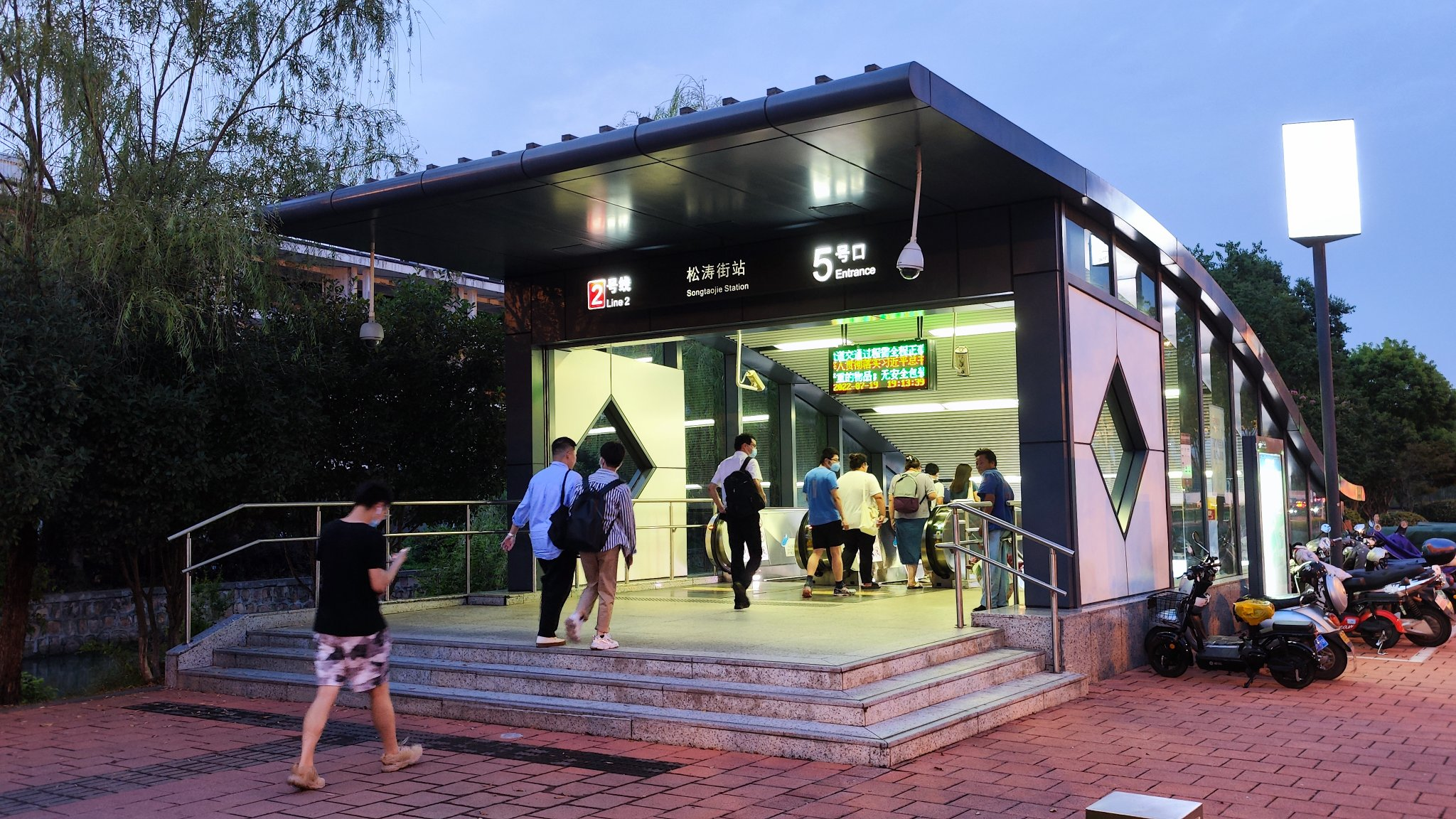

General information
- Location: Gusu District, Suzhou, Jiangsu; China
- Operated by: Suzhou Rail Transit Co., Ltd
- Line(s): Line 2 Line 8
- Platforms: 4 (2 island platform)

Construction
- Structure type: Underground

History
- Opened: September 24, 2016

Services
| Preceding station | Suzhou Rail Transit | Following station |
|---|---|---|
| Moon Bay towards Qihe | Line 2 | Jingu Lu towards Sangtiandao |
| Ren'ailu towards Xijinqiao | Line 8 | Yuxinlu towards Chefang |

Songtaojie station (Chinese: 松涛街) is a station of Line 2 and Line 8 of the Suzhou Metro located in Gusu District of Suzhou. It started operation on September 24, 2016, with the opening of the Baodaiqiao South - Sangtiandao extension on Line 2.
