= Suzhou Industrial Park railway station =

Railway station in Suzhou, China

Suzhou Industrial Park 苏州园区
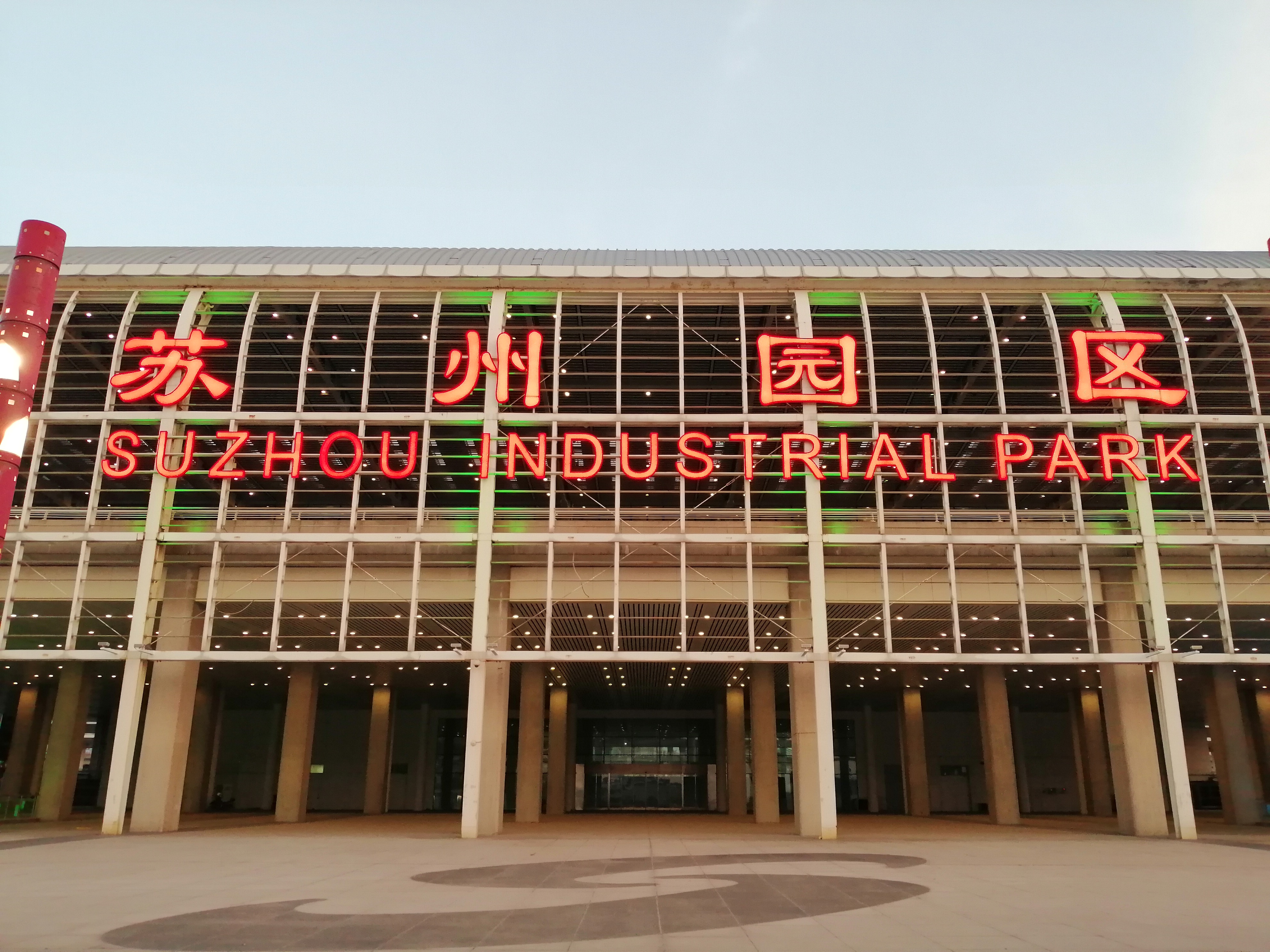
- Suzhou Industrial Park railway station

General information
- Location: West Zhihe Road, Weiting, Suzhou Industrial Park, Suzhou, Jiangsu; China
- Coordinates: 31°20′33.35″N 120°42′23.76″E
- Operated by: Shanghai Railway Bureau
- Lines: Shanghai–Nanjing Intercity Railway; Nantong-Suzhou-Jiaxing Intercity Railway (under construction)
- Platforms: 2 (proposed 3)

Construction
- Structure type: Elevated

Other information
- Station code: TMIS code: 66328; Telegraph code: KAH; Pinyin code: SZQ
- Classification: 1st class station

History
- Opened: July 1, 2010
- Previous names: Suzhou East railway station

Passengers
- 4,000 daily
Location

Suzhou Industrial Park railway station or Suzhou Yuanqu railway station (Chinese: 苏州园区站; pinyin: Sūzhōu Yuánqū zhàn) is a railway station of Shanghai–Nanjing Intercity Railway located in Suzhou Industrial Park, Suzhou, Jiangsu, People's Republic of China.

== Layout ==
This station's area is 8120 square metres. It has three floors (2 above ground and 1 underground). It has 5 tracks and 3 platforms. To enter the station, passengers can use the escalator from the ground floor to the ticket office or to the waiting hall on the 2nd floor. Passengers can exit the station through the underground passage to reach the bus station north or west of the square. There is a designated taxi pick-up area underground.

A CR200J-C EMU train passes through Suzhou Industrial Park Station.

== Transport ==
This station has 11 bus routes:

| English name | Chinese name | Routes |
|---|---|---|
| Suzhou Industrial Park railway station (Terminus) | 沪宁城铁园区站（首末站） | 115, 116, 117, 262, 819 |
| Suzhou Industrial Park railway station Plaza | 沪宁城铁园区站广场 | 119, 138, 139, 161, 166, 258 |

=== Metro station ===
It is served by Line 3 and Line 8 of the Suzhou Metro.

== Traffic ==
According to a 2016 survey, Suzhou Industrial Park railway station is the 10th most busy railway station in China.

== Gallery ==
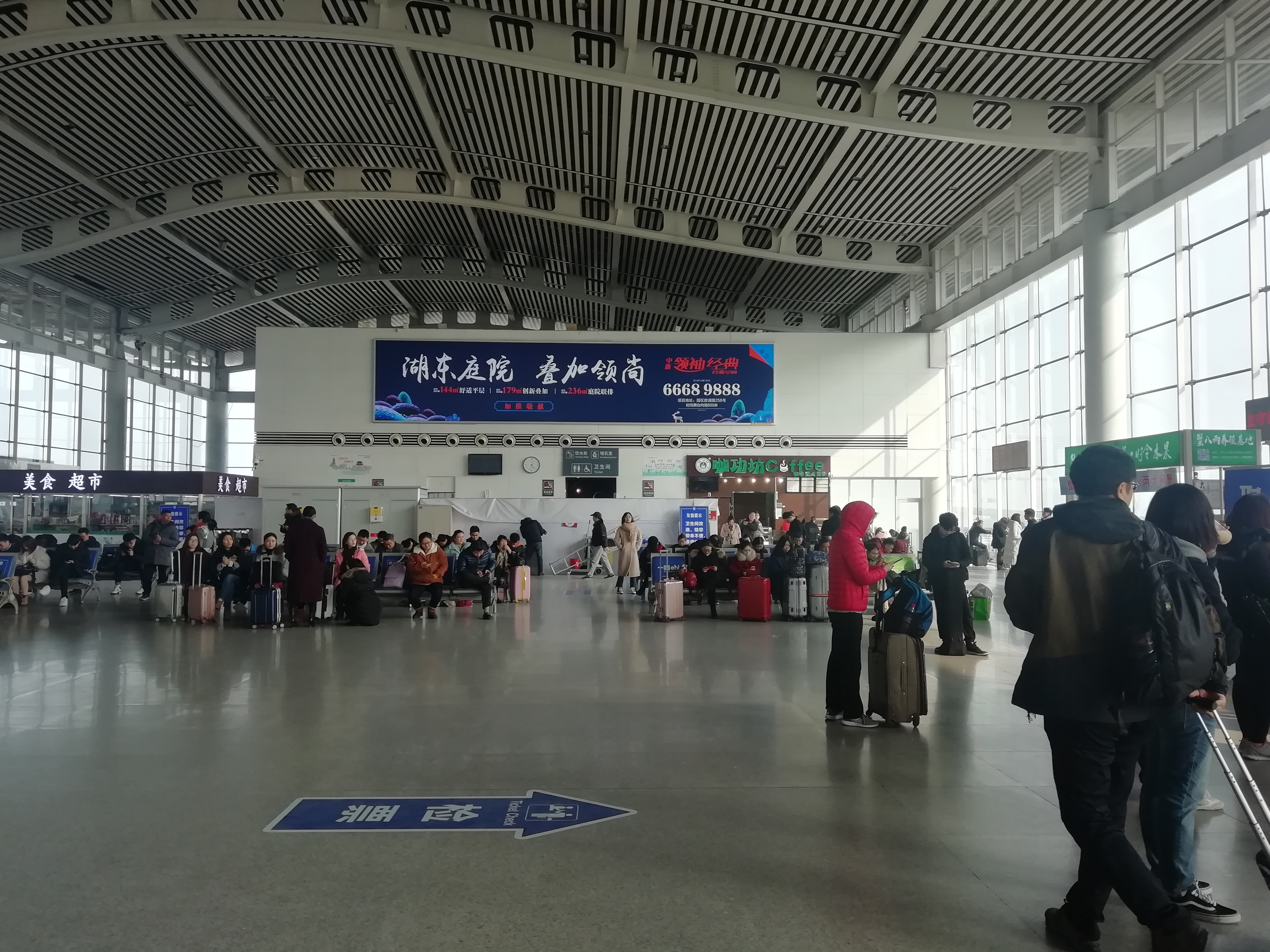
Station Hall

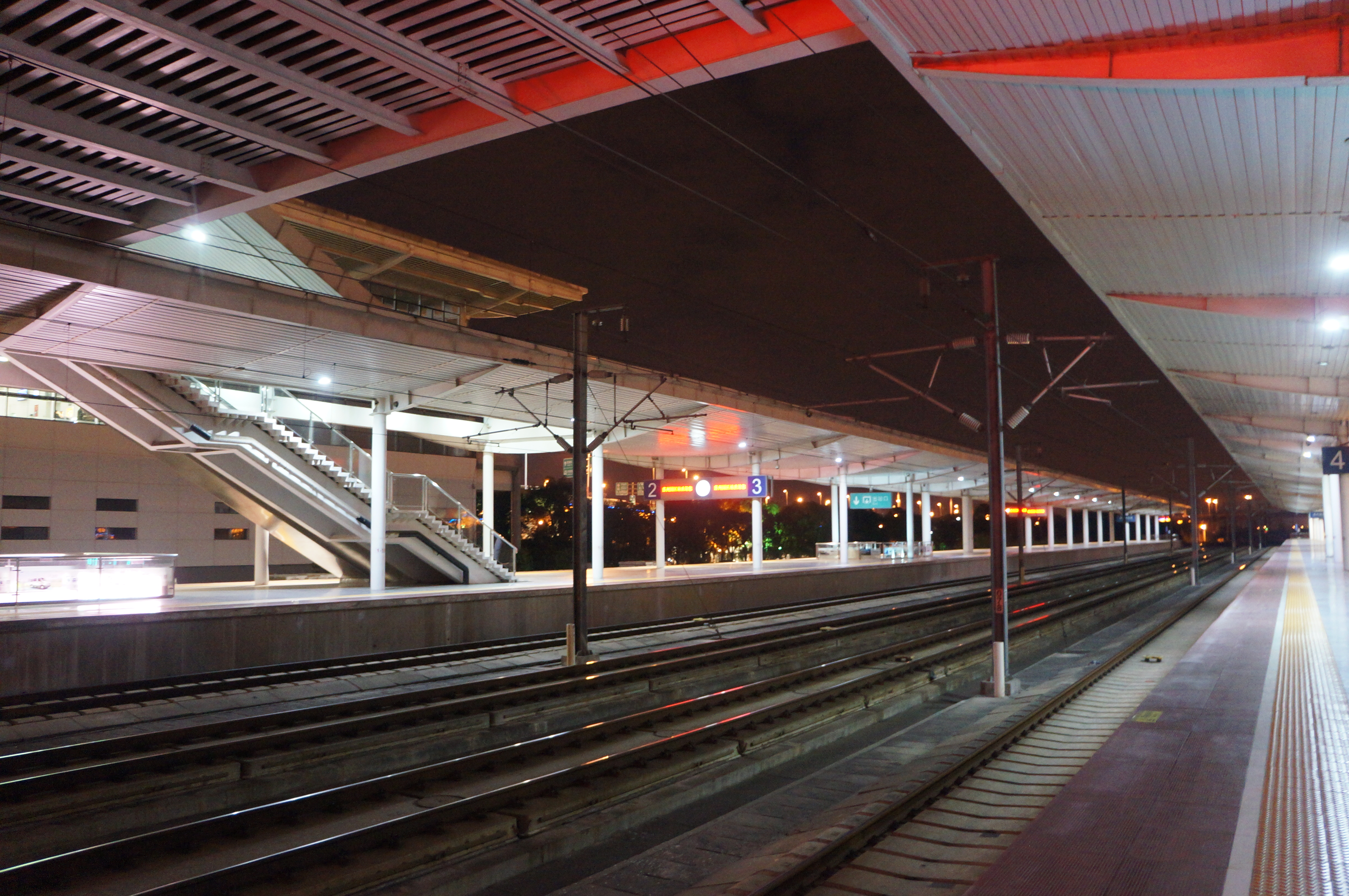
Platform

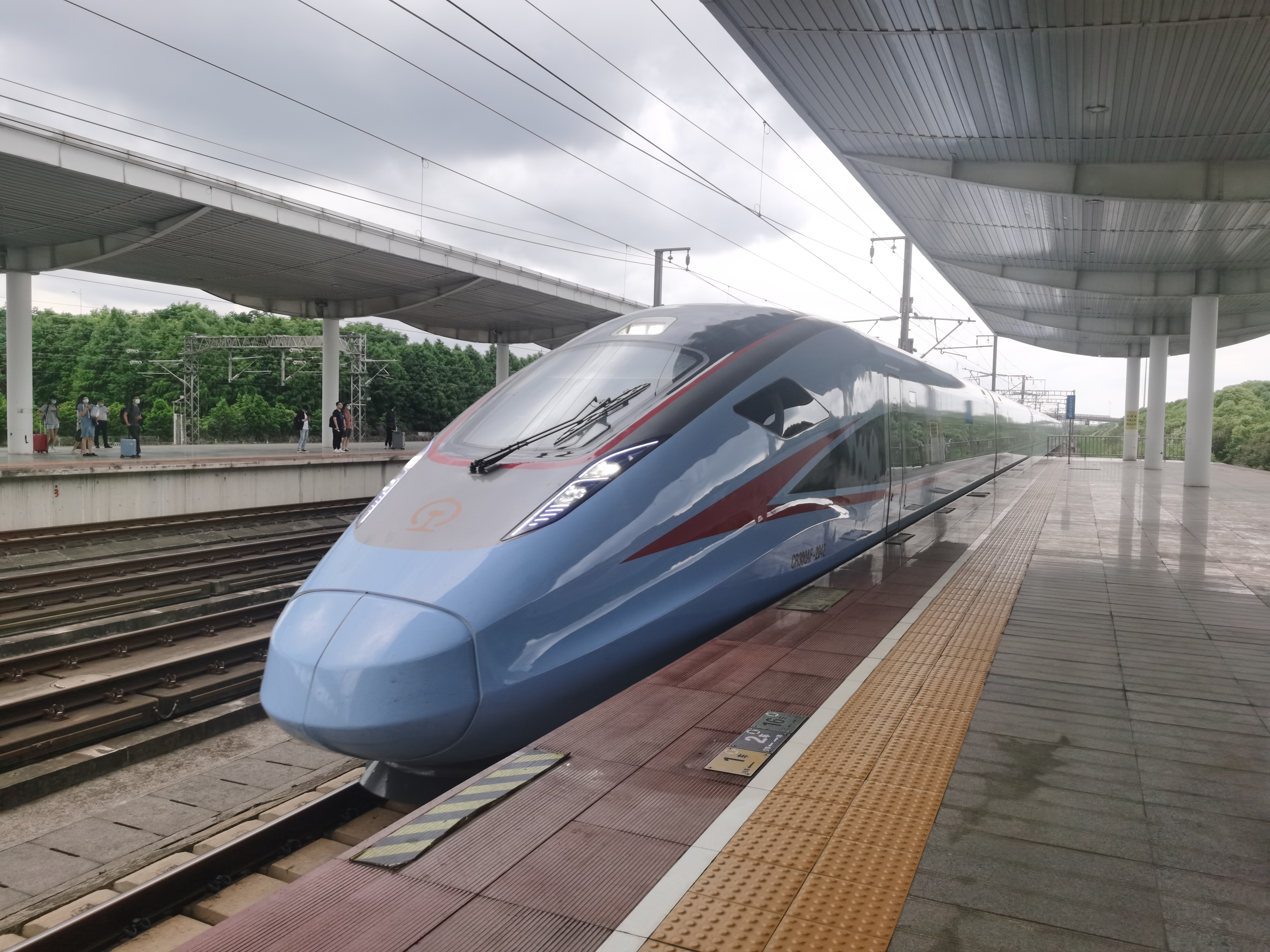
A CR300AF train arrived at Suzhou Industrial Park.

| Preceding station | China Railway High-speed | Following station |
|---|---|---|
| Yangchenghu towards Shanghai or Shanghai Hongqiao | Shanghai–Nanjing intercity railway Part of the Huhanrong Passenger Dedicated Line | Suzhou towards Nanjing |
| Suzhou North towards Nantong West | Nantong–Suzhou–Jiaxing intercity railway | Wujiang towards Jiaxing South |
| Preceding station | Suzhou Metro | Following station |
| Kuatang towards Suzhou Xinqu Railway Station | Line 3 | Fangwanjie towards Weiting |
| Gulou towards Xijinqiao | Line 8 | Huachibang towards Chefang |
