= Moon Bay station =

Suzhou Metro station

Coordinates: 31°15′45″N 120°43′23″E

Moon Bay 月亮湾
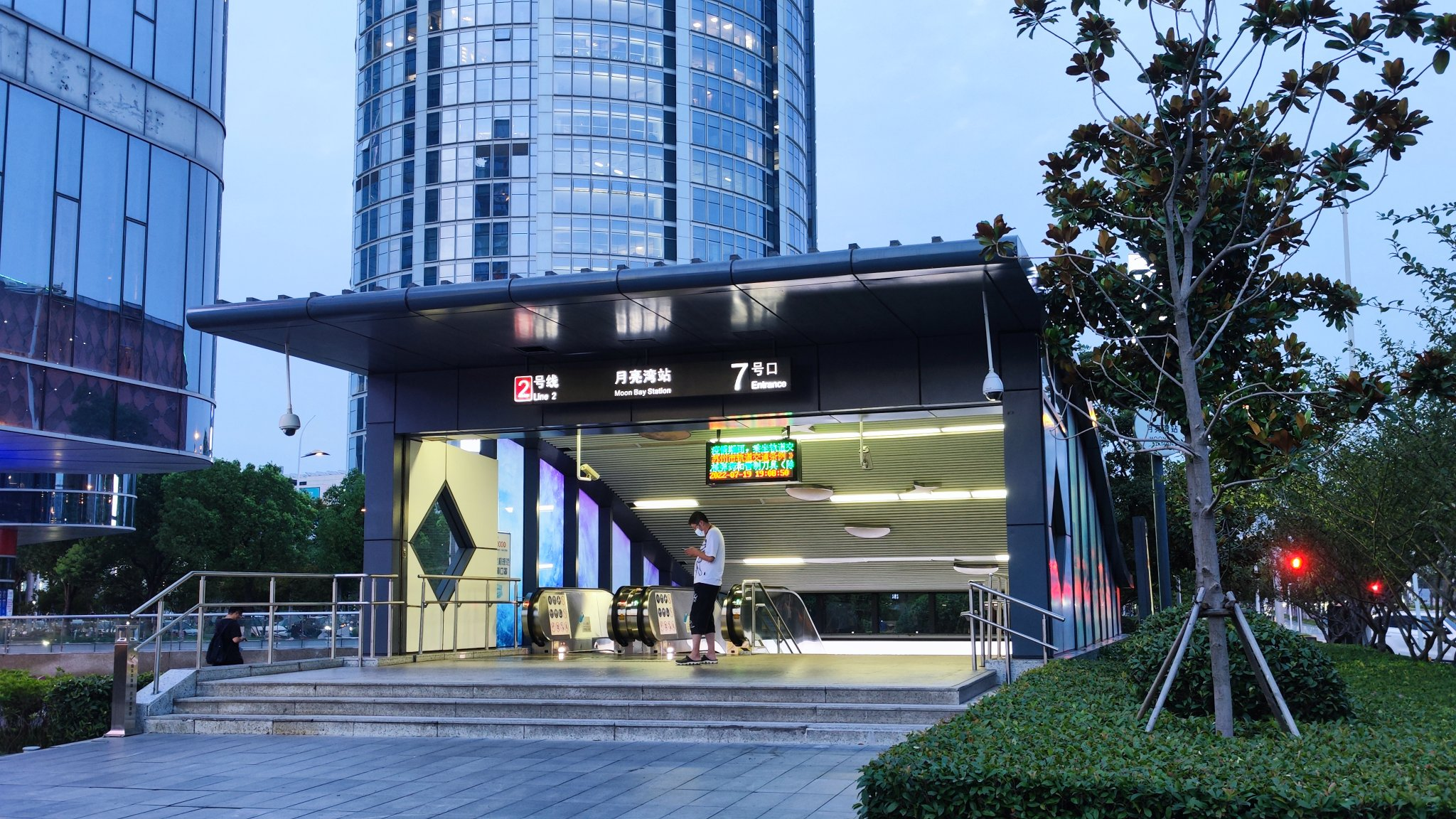

General information
- Other names: Yueliang Wan
- Location: Gusu District, Suzhou, Jiangsu; China
- Operated by: Suzhou Rail Transit Co., Ltd
- Line(s): Line 2
- Platforms: 2 (1 island platform)

Construction
- Structure type: Underground

History
- Opened: September 24, 2016

Services
Preceding station	Suzhou Rail Transit	Following station
Dushuhu Neighborhood Center towards Qihe	Line 2	Songtaojie towards Sangtiandao

Moon Bay Station (Chinese: 月亮湾) is a station on Line 2 of the Suzhou Metro located in Gusu District of Suzhou. It started operation on September 24, 2016, with the opening of the Baodaiqiao South - Sangtiandao extension on Line 2.
