= Fuyuan Lu station =

Suzhou Metro station

Coordinates: 31°24′20″N 120°37′15″E

Fuyuan Lu 富元路
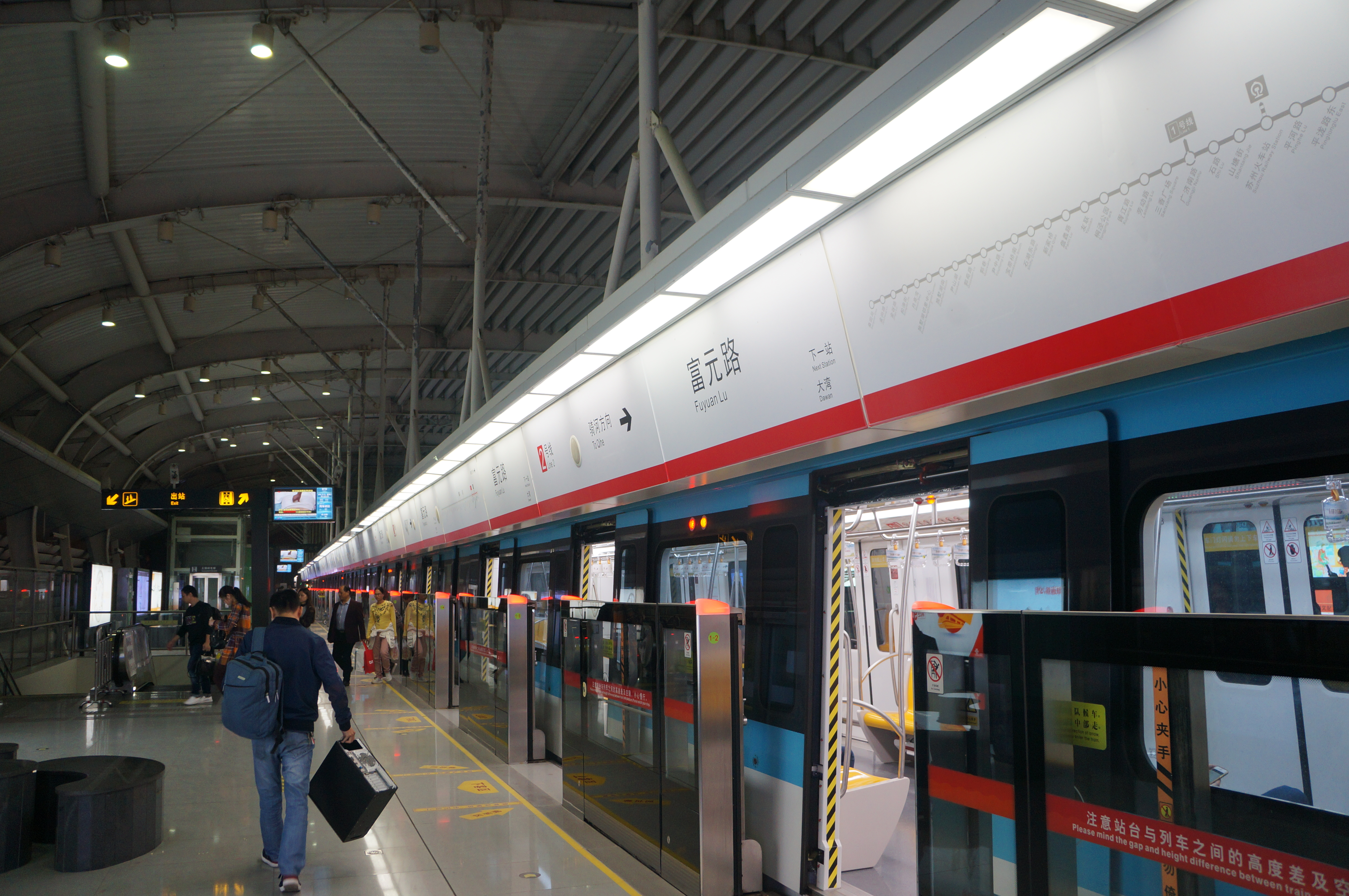

General information
- Location: Xiangcheng District, Suzhou, Jiangsu; China
- Operated by: Suzhou Rail Transit Co., Ltd
- Line(s): Line 2
- Platforms: 2 (2 side platforms)

Construction
- Structure type: Elevated

History
- Opened: December 28, 2013

Services
Preceding station	Suzhou Metro	Following station
Dawan towards Qihe	Line 2	Likou towards Sangtiandao

Fuyuan Lu Station (Chinese: 富元路站) is a station on Line 2 of the Suzhou Metro. The station is located in Xiangcheng District of Suzhou. It started service on December 28, 2013, when Line 2 first opened.
