= Likou station =

Suzhou Metro station

Coordinates: 31°23′24″N 120°37′10″E

Likou 蠡口
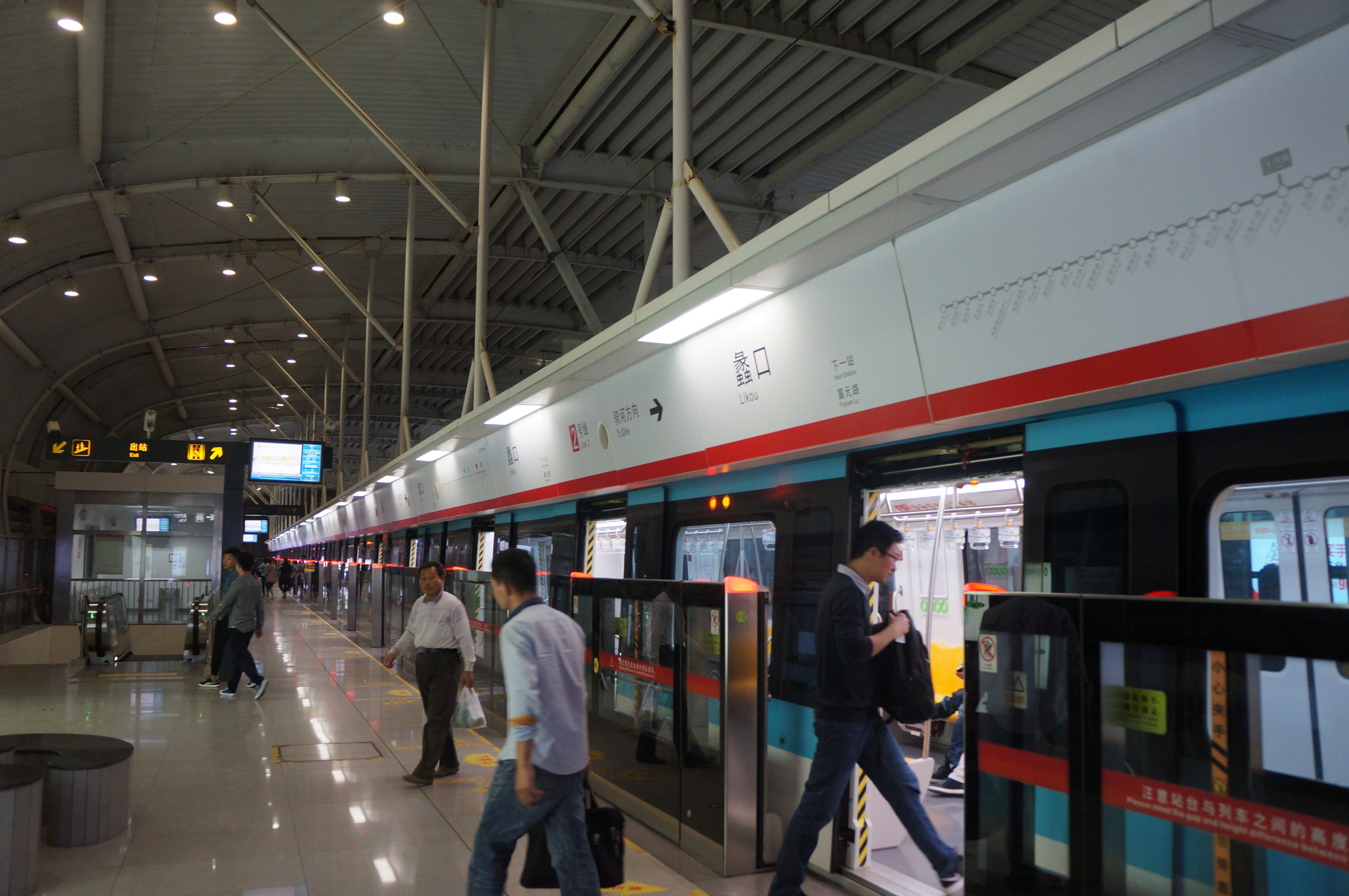

General information
- Location: Xiangcheng District, Suzhou, Jiangsu; China
- Operated by: Suzhou Rail Transit Co., Ltd
- Line: Line 2
- Platforms: 2 (2 side platforms)

Construction
- Structure type: Elevated

History
- Opened: December 28, 2013

Services
Preceding station	Suzhou Metro	Following station
Fuyuan Lu towards Qihe	Line 2	Xutu Gang towards Sangtiandao

Likou Station (Chinese: 蠡口站) is a station on Line 2 of the Suzhou Metro. The station is located in Xiangcheng District of Suzhou. It started service on December 28, 2013, when Line 2 first opened.

== Bus Connections ==
Connection Bus Stop: AnYuanJiaYuan

Connection Routes: 802, 809, 810
