= Jinshang Lu station =

Suzhou Metro station

Coordinates: 31°16′21″N 120°45′58″E

Jinshang Lu 金尚路
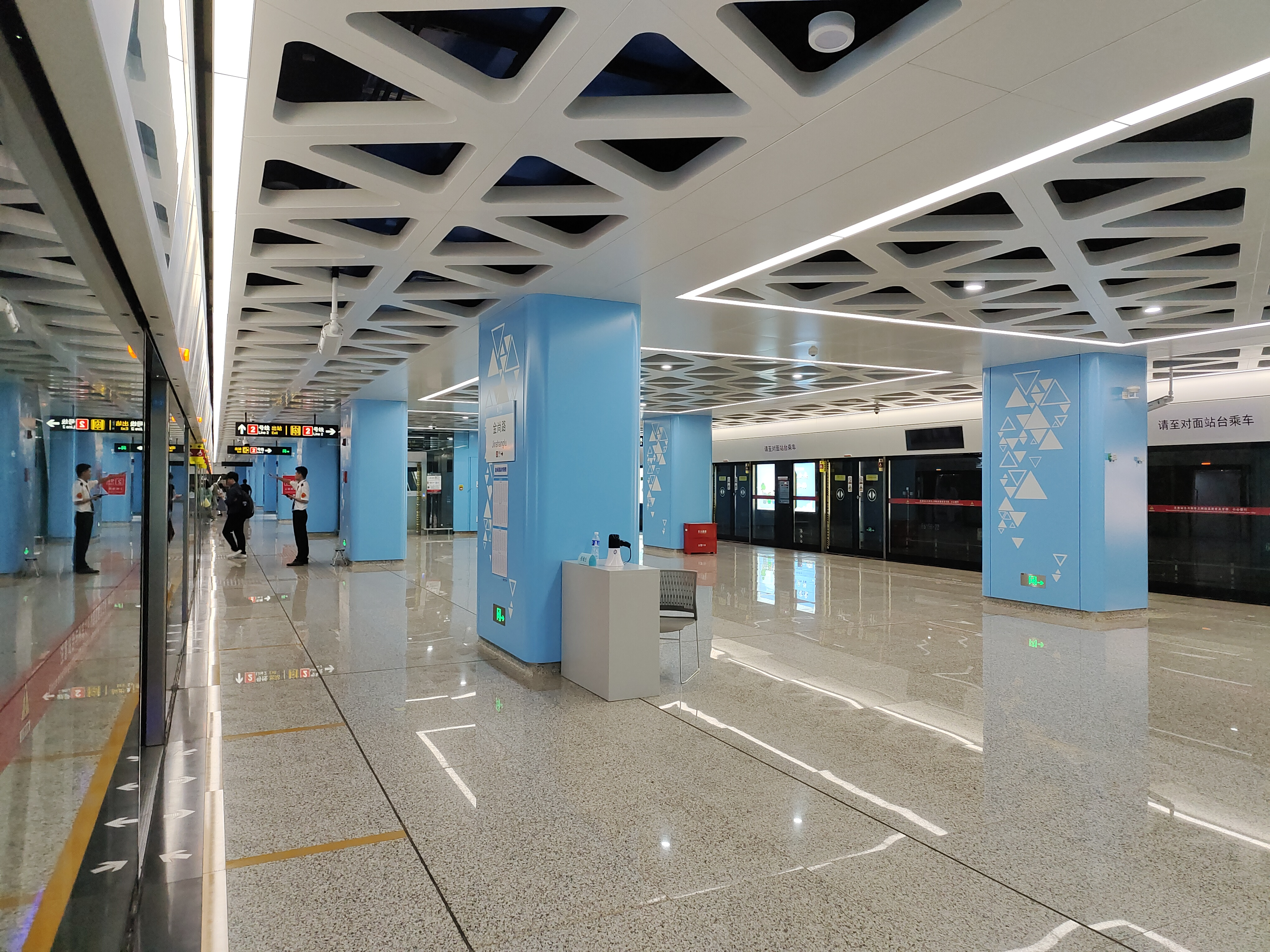
- Line 6 platform

General information
- Location: Gusu District, Suzhou, Jiangsu; China
- Operated by: Suzhou Rail Transit Co., Ltd
- Line(s): Line 2 Line 6
- Platforms: 4 (2 island platforms)

Construction
- Structure type: Underground

History
- Opened: September 24, 2016

Services
Preceding station	Suzhou Rail Transit	Following station
Jingu Lu towards Qihe	Line 2	Sangtiandao Terminus
Nanxiebu towards Suzhou Xinqu Railway Station	Line 6	Sangtiandao Terminus

Jinshang Lu Station (Chinese: 金尚路) is a station of Line 2 and Line 6 of the Suzhou Metro located in Gusu District of Suzhou. It started operation on September 24, 2016, with the opening of the Baodaiqiao South - Sangtiandao extension on Line 2. The station is one of three interchanges between Line 2 and Line 6.
