= Dawan station =

Suzhou Metro station

Coordinates: 31°25′07″N 120°37′44″E

Dawan 大湾
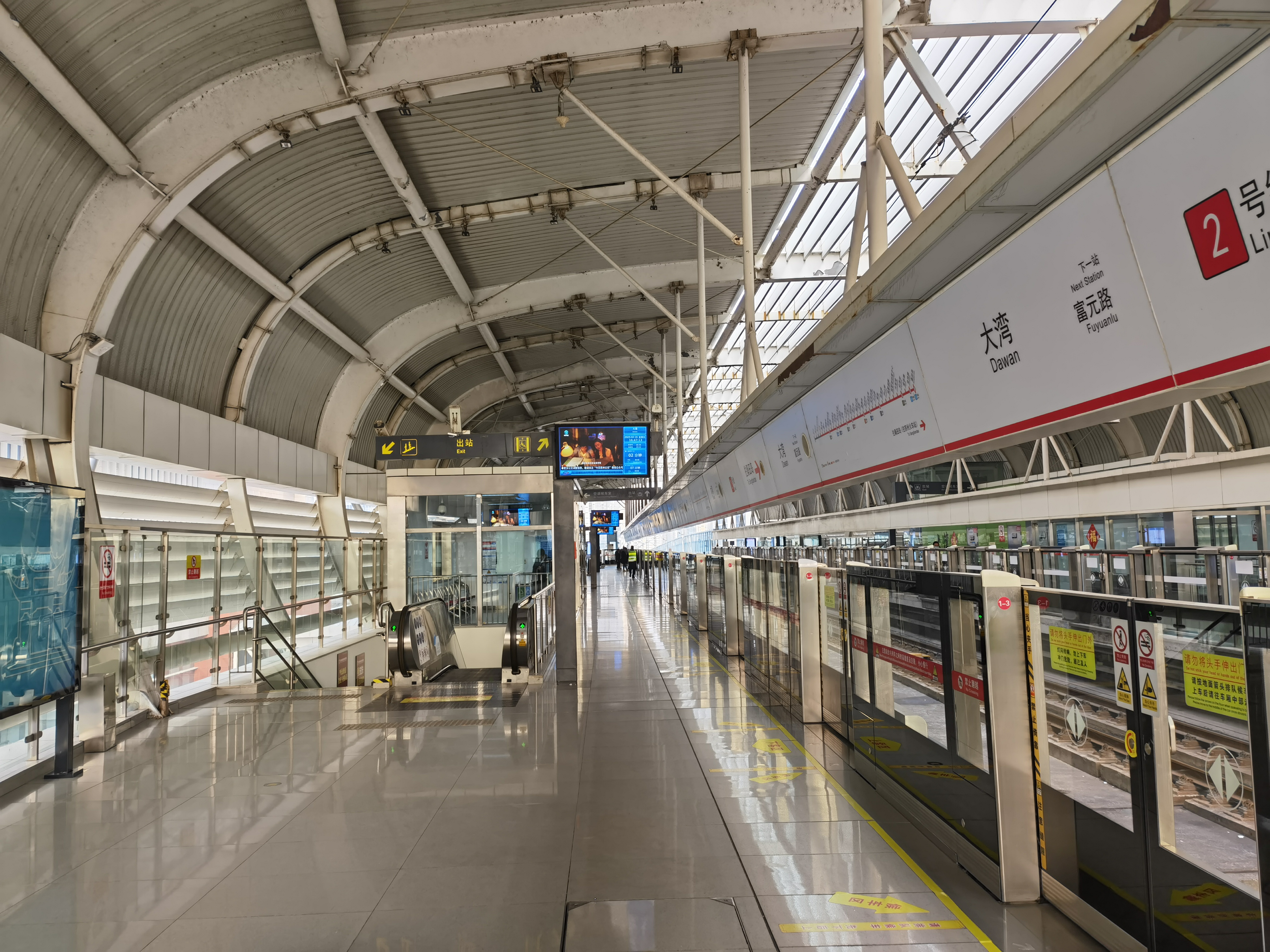

General information
- Location: Xiangcheng District, Suzhou, Jiangsu; China
- Operated by: Suzhou Rail Transit Co., Ltd
- Line: Line 2
- Platforms: 2 (2 side platforms)

Construction
- Structure type: Elevated

History
- Opened: December 28, 2013

Services
Preceding station	Suzhou Metro	Following station
Suzhoubei Railway Station towards Qihe	Line 2	Fuyuan Lu towards Sangtiandao
Location

Dawan Station (Chinese: 大湾站) is a station on Line 2 of the Suzhou Metro. The station is located in Xiangcheng District of Suzhou. It started service on December 28, 2013, when Line 2 first opened.

== Bus Connections ==
Connection Bus Stop: Dawan Bridge

Connection Routes: 80, 83, 84, 712, 811
