= Line 8 (Suzhou Metro) =

Metro line in Suzhou, Jiangsu, China

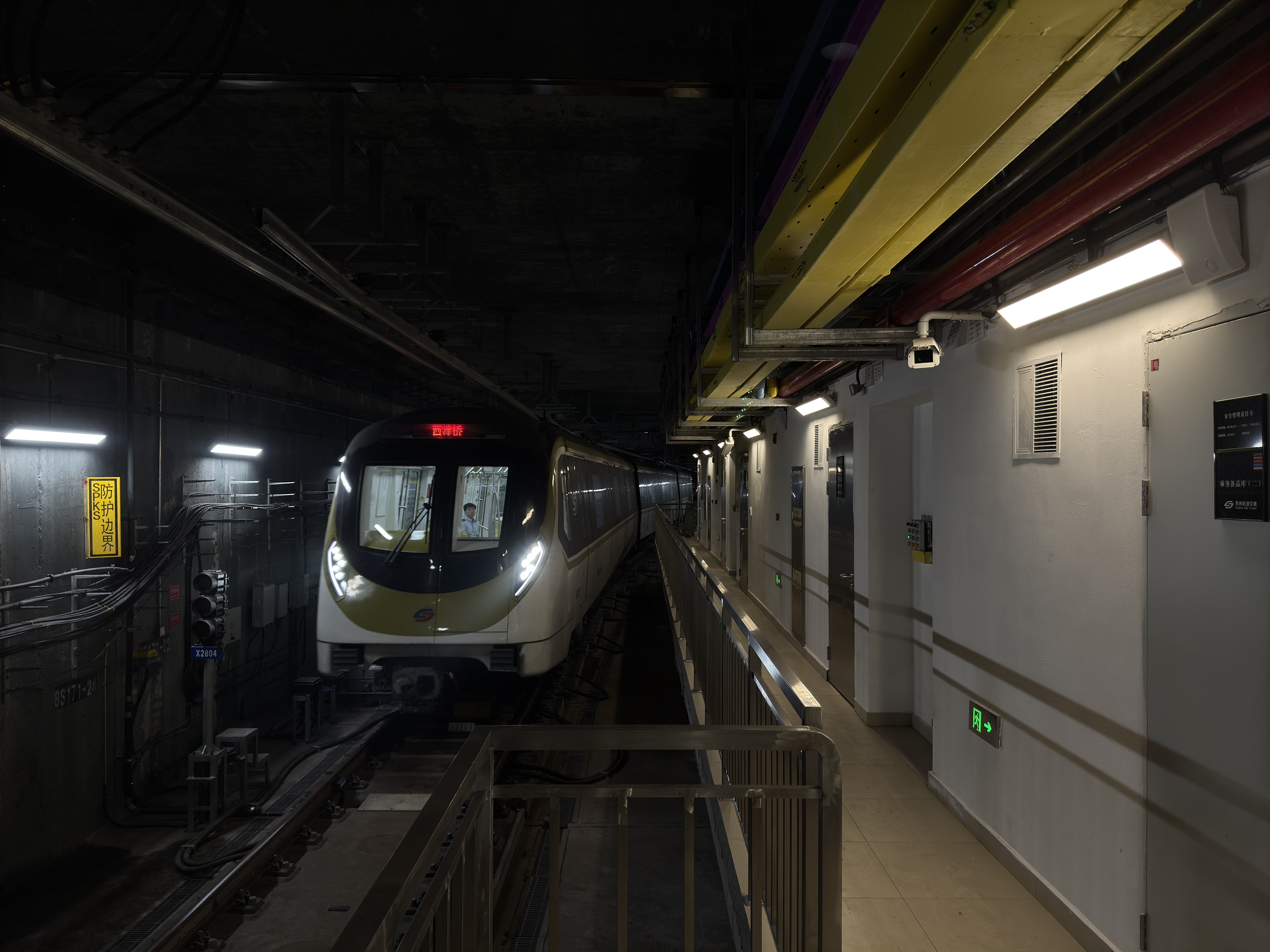
- A train of Suzhou Metro Line 8

Overview
- Status: In operation
- Owner: Suzhou Rail Transit Co., Ltd
- Termini: Xijinqiao; Chefang
- Stations: 28

Service
- Type: Rapid transit
- System: Suzhou Metro
- Operator(s): Suzhou Rail Transit Co., Ltd

History
- Opened: 10 September 2024; 13 months ago

Technical
- Line length: 35.6 km
- Track gauge: 1,435 mm (4 ft 8 1/2 in)
- Operating speed: 80 km/h
- Highest elevation: Underground

Line 8 of the Suzhou Metro (Chinese: 苏州轨道交通8号线) is a L-shaped rapid transit line on both the east-west and north-south axes. It serves Suzhou New District, Gusu District, Xiangcheng District, and Suzhou Industrial Park. Construction started on September 30, 2019, and completed in March 2024. Line 8 was opened on September 10, 2024.

== Stations ==
Station name		Connections	Distance km		Location
English	Chinese	Connections	Distance km		Location
Xijinqiao	西津桥	3	-	0	Huqiu
Xinyuan	新元				Huqiu
Shijiaqiao	时家桥				Gusu
Baiyangwangongyuan	白洋湾公园	6			Gusu
Hubeilu	虎北路				Gusu
Huqiushidigongyuan	虎丘湿地公园				Xiangcheng
Sunwu Jinianyuan	孙武纪念园	4			Xiangcheng
Yuyao	御窑				Xiangcheng
Lumu Guxiang	陆慕古巷				Xiangcheng
Yangchenghuzhonglu	阳澄湖中路	2			Xiangcheng
Xiawei	夏圩				Xiangcheng
Baidang North	白荡北	7			Xiangcheng
Wucongjing	五潨泾				Xiangcheng
Guxiangwei	古香圩				Xiangcheng
Nanzezhuang	南泽庄				SIP
Tangzhuang	唐庄	3			SIP
Gulou	古楼				SIP
Suzhou Yuanqu Railway Station	苏州园区火车站	3			SIP
Huachibang	华池浜				SIP
Times Square	时代广场	1			SIP
Suzhou Museum of Contemporary Art	苏州当代美术馆				SIP
Qiongjidun	琼姬墩	6			SIP
Xietang	斜塘	5			SIP
Lianchiqiao	莲池桥				SIP
Ren'ailu	仁爱路				SIP
Songtaojie	松涛街	2			SIP
Yuxinlu	裕新路				SIP
Chefang	车坊				SIP

== Future Development ==
A one-station extension from Chefang to Xinpingjie is under planning. The underground extension will be 1.34 km long.

== Rolling stock ==
Fleet numbers	Year built	Time in service	Builder	Class	Number in service	No of car	Assembly	Rolling stock	Number	Depots	Line assigned	Notes
246 (41 sets)	2023-2024	2024-present	CRRC Nanjing Puzhen	B	192 (32 sets)	6	Tc+Mp+M - M + Mp+Tc	PM211	080101-084106 (0801-0341)	Huoditan Depot; Sanjiaoju Yard	8	
