= Xutu Gang station =

Suzhou Metro station

Coordinates: 31°22′39″N 120°37′17″E

Xutu Gang 徐图港
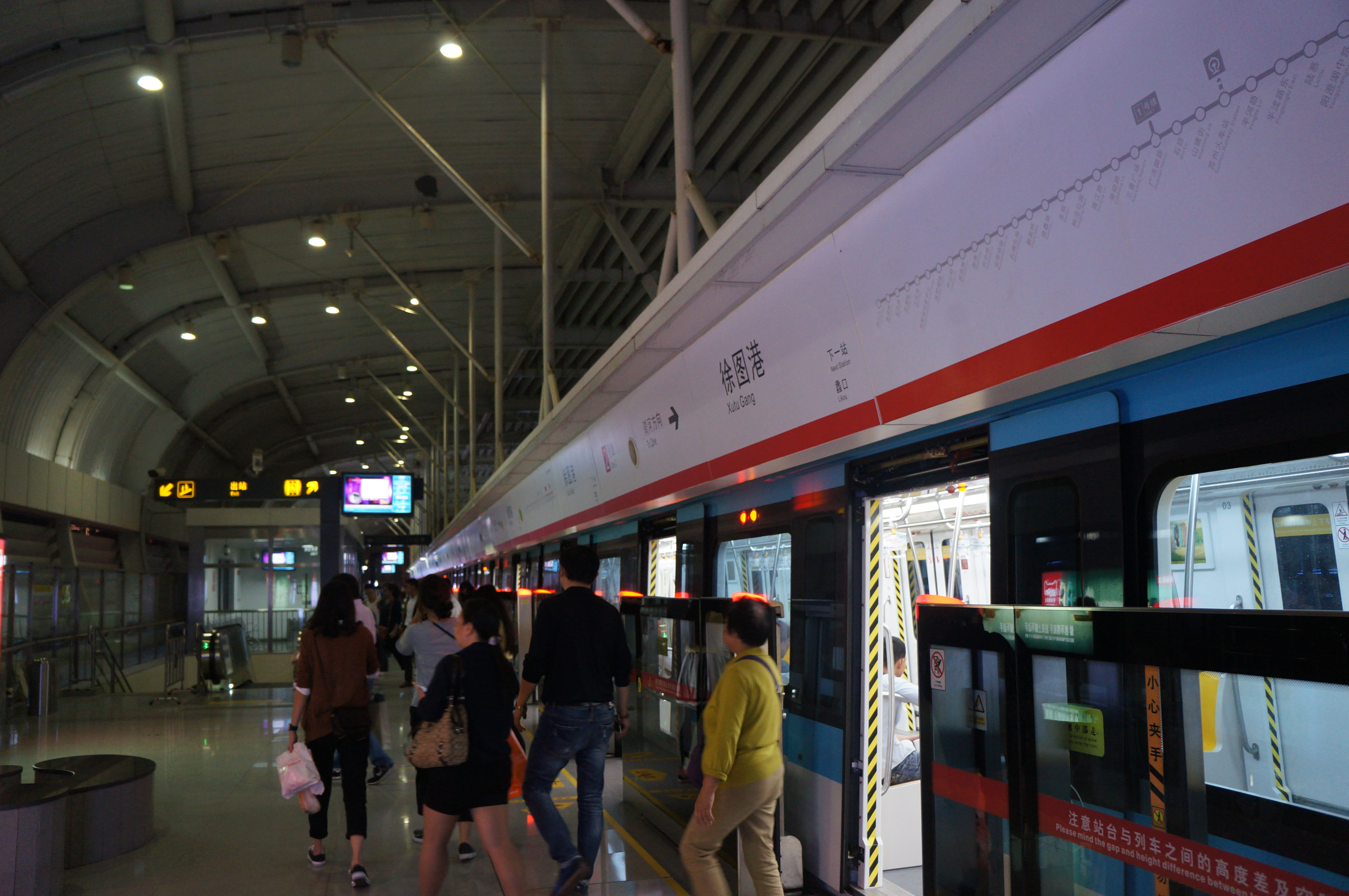

General information
- Location: Xiangcheng District, Suzhou, Jiangsu; China
- Operated by: Suzhou Rail Transit Co., Ltd
- Line(s): Line 2
- Platforms: 2 (2 side platforms)

Construction
- Structure type: Elevated

History
- Opened: December 28, 2013

Services
| Preceding station | Suzhou Metro | Following station |
|---|---|---|
| Likou towards Qihe | Line 2 | Yangchenghu Zhonglu towards Sangtiandao |

Xutu Gang Station (Chinese: 徐图港站) is a station on Line 2 of the Suzhou Metro. The station is located in Xiangcheng District of Suzhou. It started service on December 28, 2013, when Line 2 first opened.

== Bus Connections ==
Connection Bus Stops: Cailian Transportation Center, North Cailian Transportation Center, East Xiangcheng Hospital, YuanHeZhiChun, Xiangcheng Hospital

Connection Bus Routes: 3, Ye4 (Night Route), 5, 7, 77, 78, 83, 801, 802, 805, 807, 808, 809, 810, 812, 814, 818, 825, 832
