= Xijinqiao station =

Suzhou Metro station

Coordinates: 31°18′54″N 120°32′32″E

Xijinqiao 西津桥
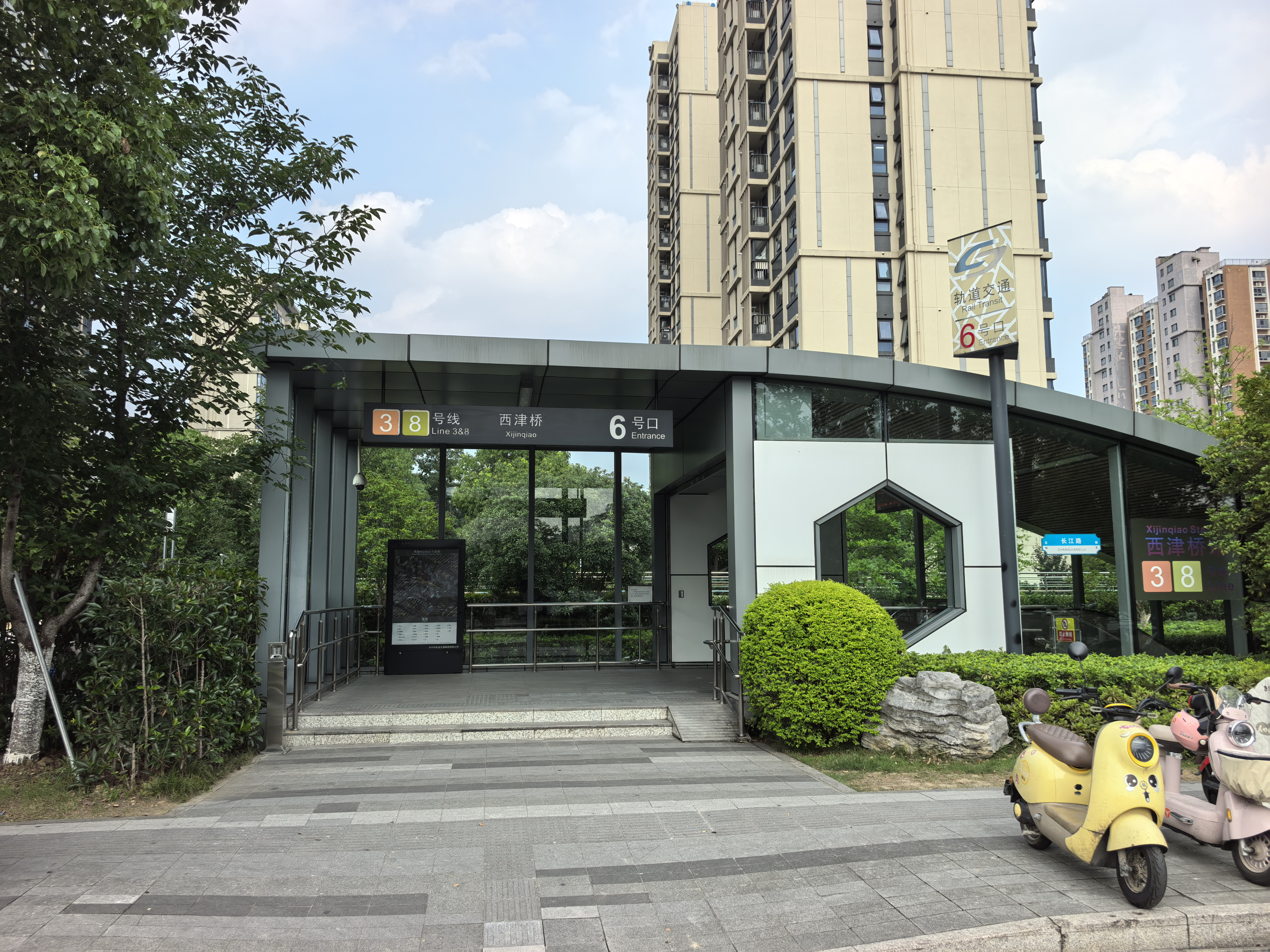

General information
- Location: Huqiu District, Suzhou, Jiangsu; China
- Operated by: Suzhou Rail Transit Co., Ltd
- Lines: Line 3 Line 8
- Platforms: 4 (2 island platform)

Construction
- Structure type: Underground

History
- Opened: December 25, 2019

Services
Preceding station	Suzhou Metro	Following station
Mayunlu towards Suzhou Xinqu Railway Station	Line 3	Heshan towards Weiting
Terminus	Line 8	Xinyuan towards Chefang
Location

Xijinqiao Station (Chinese: 西津桥) is a station of Line 3 and the western terminus of Line 8 of the Suzhou Metro. The station is located in Huqiu District, Suzhou. It has been in use since December 25, 2019, when Line 3 first opened to the public.
