= Shantang Jie station =

Suzhou Metro station

Coordinates: 31°19′18″N 120°35′52″E

Shantang Jie 山塘街
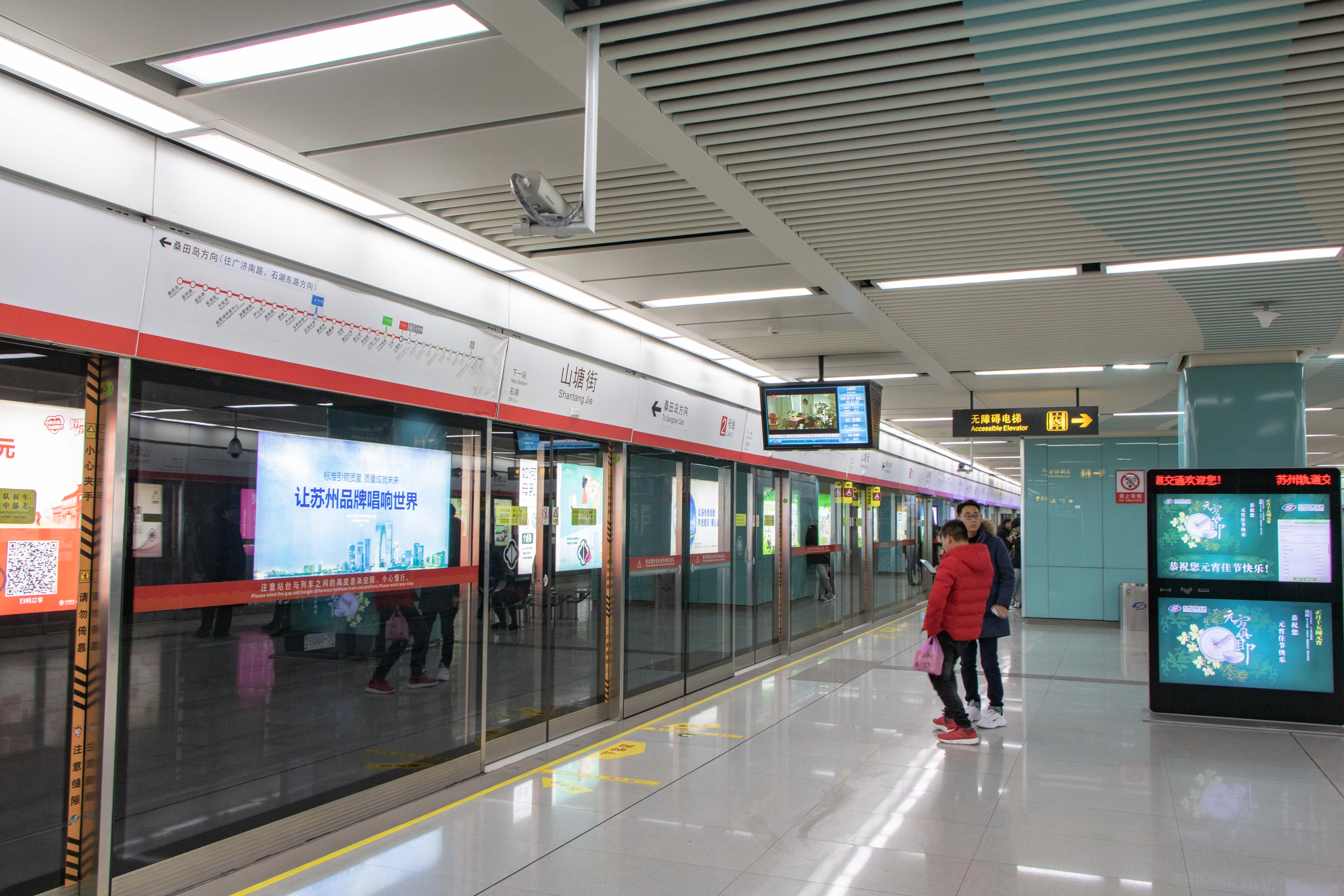

General information
- Location: Gusu District, Suzhou, Jiangsu; China
- Operated by: Suzhou Rail Transit Co., Ltd
- Line: Line 2
- Platforms: 2 (1 island platform)

Construction
- Structure type: Underground

History
- Opened: December 28, 2013

Services
Preceding station	Suzhou Metro	Following station
Suzhou Railway Station towards Qihe	Line 2	Shi Lu towards Sangtiandao
Location

Stantang Jie Station (Chinese: 山塘街站; lit. Shantang Street Station) is a station on Line 2 of the Suzhou Metro. The station is located in Gusu District of Suzhou. It started service on December 28, 2013, when Line 2 first opened.

== See also ==
- Shantang Street
