= Xihuan Lu station =

Suzhou Metro station

Coordinates: 31°18′13″N 120°34′24″E

Xihuan Lu 西环路
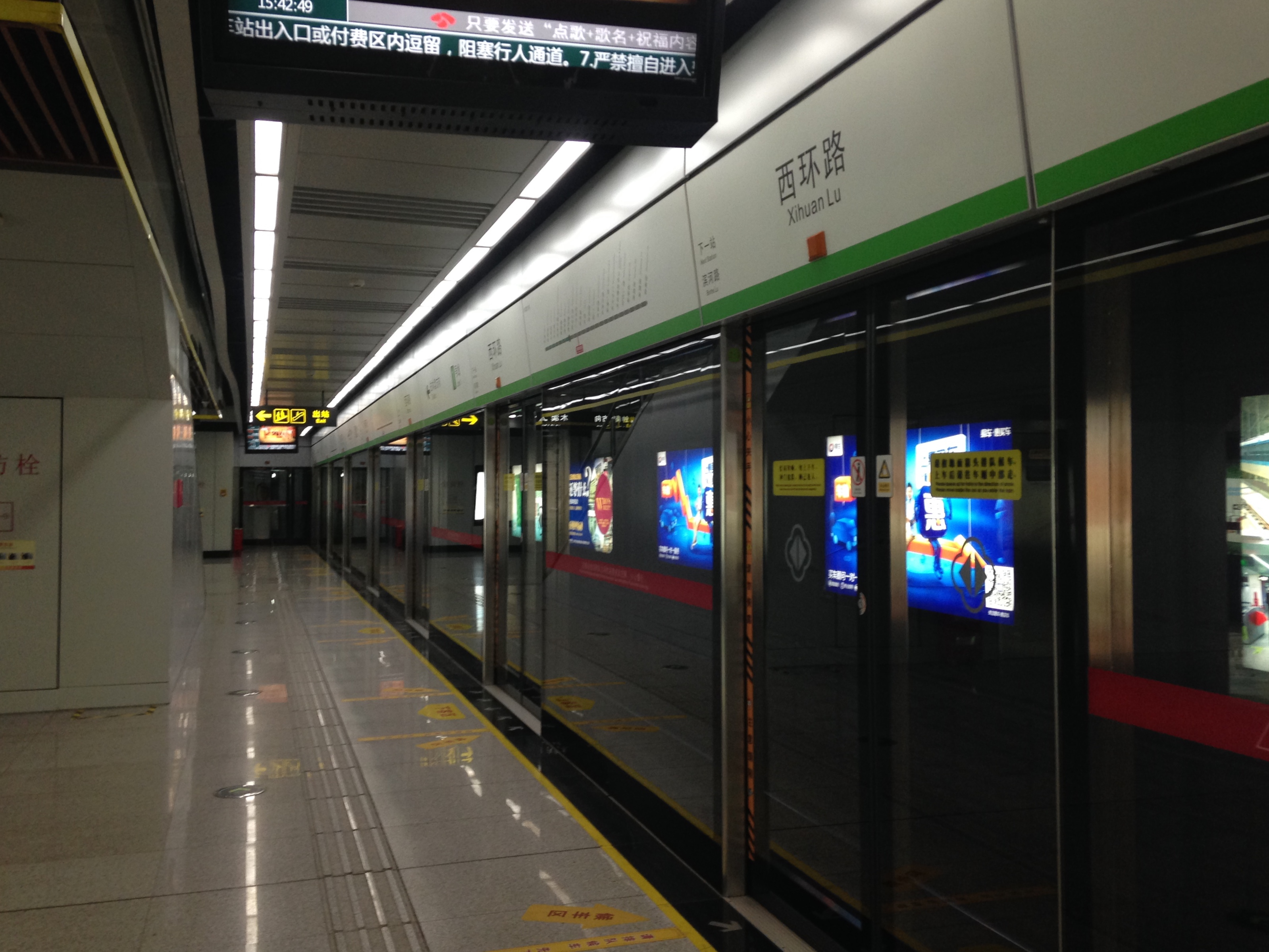
- Platform in August 2015

General information
- Other names: Xihuan Road
- Location: Gusu District, Suzhou, Jiangsu; China
- Operated by: Suzhou Rail Transit Co., Ltd
- Line: Line 1
- Platforms: 2 (1 island platform)

Construction
- Structure type: Underground

History
- Opened: April 28, 2012

Services
Preceding station	Suzhou Metro	Following station
Binhe Lu towards Mudu	Line 1	Tongjing Beilu towards Zhongnanjie
Location

Xihuan Road Station (Chinese: 西环路站) is a station of Line 1 of the Suzhou Metro. The station is located in Gusu District of Suzhou. It has been in use since April 28, 2012, when Line 1 first opened.

== Station ==
=== Accessible Information ===
- Xihuan Lu Station is a fully accessible station, this station equipped with wheelchair accessible elevators, blind paths with bumps, and wheelchair ramps. These facilities can help people with disabilities, seniors, youths, and pregnancies travel through Suzhou Metro system.

=== Station configurations ===
L1 (First Floor/Street Level): Entrances/Exits (stairs and escalators); and elevators with wheelchair accessible ramps.

B1 (Mezzanine/Station Hall Level): Station Control Room; Customer Service; Automatic Ticket Vending Machines; Automatic Fee Collection Systems with turnstiles; stairs and escalators; and elevators with wheelchair accessible ramps.

B2 (Platform Level): Platform; toilet; stairs and escalators; elevators with wheelchair accessible ramps.

== Station layout ==
L1	Street Level	Entrances/Exits
B1	Mezzanine	Station Control, Customer Service, Fare-gates, Ticketing Machines
B2; Platform level	To Zhongnan Jie	← Line 1 towards Zhongnan Jie Next Station: Tongjing Beilu
B2; Platform level	Island platform, doors will open on the left
B2; Platform level	To Mudu	→Line 1 towards Mudu Next Station: Binhe Lu

== First & Last Trains ==
Directions	First Train	Last Train
Daily
Line 1
Towards Zhongnan Jie Station	06:24	22:14
Towards Mudu Station	06:42	23:07

== Exits Information ==
- Exit 2: South-East Corner of Xihuan Lu and Ganjiang Xilu
- Exit 3: North-East Corner of Xihuan Lu and Ganjiang Xilu
- Exit 4: North-West Corner of Xihuan Lu and Ganjiang Xilu

== Local attractions ==
- SanYuan YiCun
- SanYuan ErCun
- SanYuan SanCun
- SanYuan SiCun
- BinHe Merchants Building
- SanYuan Building
- BaiLian Garden
- Suzhou SanYuan Middle School (Branch School of Suzhou No.1 Middle School)
- Canal Park
- Thermo-technical Research Institute

== Bus Connections ==
- Bus Stop: Xinlian Qiao - Connection Bus Routes: 9, 60, 64, 332, 333, 333 LongChi Special Line, 935
- Bus Stop: SanYuan XinCun - Connection Bus Routes: 9,10, 306,332, 931, 935, BRT 8
- Bus Stop: ShiSHanQiao Dong - Connection Bus Routes: 10, 60, 64, 306, 333, 333 KongChi Special Line, 931, BRT 8
