= Tongjing Beilu station =

Suzhou Metro station

Coordinates: 31°18′18″N 120°35′12″E

Tongjing Beilu 桐泾北路
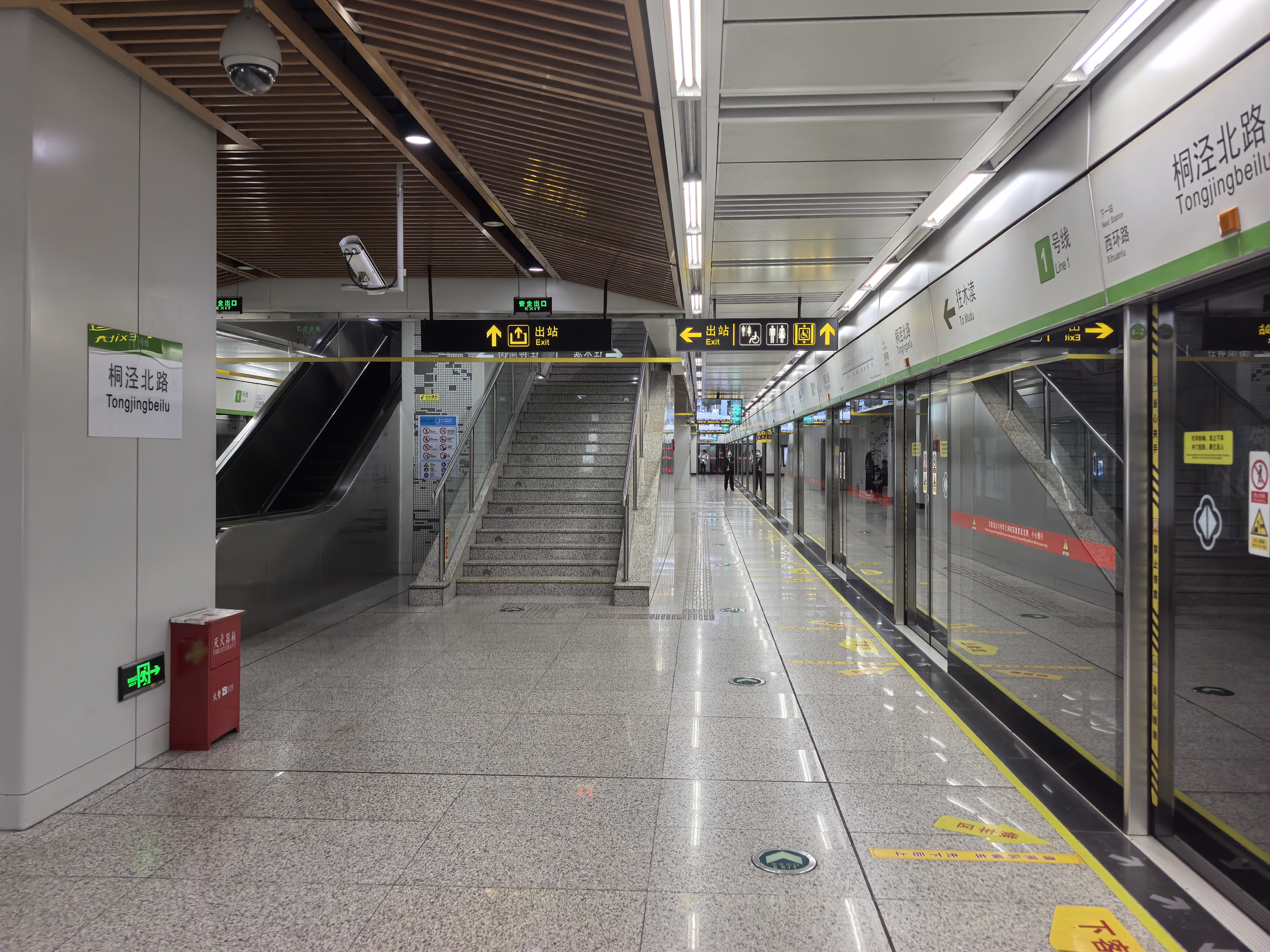

General information
- Other names: North Tongjing Road
- Location: Gusu District, Suzhou, Jiangsu; China
- Operated by: Suzhou Rail Transit Co., Ltd
- Line: Line 1
- Platforms: 2 (1 island platform)

Construction
- Structure type: Underground

History
- Opened: April 28, 2012

Services
Preceding station	Suzhou Metro	Following station
Xihuan Lu towards Mudu	Line 1	Guangji Nanlu towards Zhongnanjie
Location

Tongjing Beilu Station (Chinese: 桐泾北路站) is a station of Line 1 of the Suzhou Metro. The station is located in Gusu District of Suzhou. It has been in use since April 28, 2012, when Line 1 first opened.

== Station ==
=== Accessible Information ===
- Tongjing Beilu Station is a fully accessible station, this station equipped with wheelchair accessible elevators, blind paths with bumps, and wheelchair ramps. These facilities can help people with disabilities, seniors, youths, and pregnancies travel through the Suzhou Metro system.

=== Station configurations ===
L1 (First Floor/Street Level): Entrances/Exits (stairs and escalators); and elevators with wheelchair accessible ramps.

B1 (Mezzanine/Station Hall Level): Station Control Room; Customer Service; Automatic Ticket Vending Machines; Automatic Fee Collection Systems with turnstiles; stairs and escalators; and elevators with wheelchair accessible ramps.

B2 (Platform Level): Platform; toilet; stairs and escalators; elevators with wheelchair accessible ramps.

== Station layout ==
L1	Street Level	Entrances/Exits
B1	Mezzanine	Station Control, Customer Service, Fare-gates, Ticketing Machines
B2; Platform level	To Zhongnan Jie	← Line 1 towards Zhongnan Jie Next Station: Guangji Nanlu
B2; Platform level	Island platform, doors will open on the left
B2; Platform level	To Mudu	→Line 1 towards Mudu Next Station: Xihuan Lu

== First & Last Trains ==
Directions	First Train	Last Train
Daily
Line 1
Towards Zhongnan Jie Station	06:27	22:17
Towards Mudu Station	06:40	23:05

== Exits Information ==
- Exit 1: South-West Corner of Tongjing Lu and Ganjiang Lu
- Exit 2: South-East Corner of Tongjing Lu and Ganjiang Lu
- Exit 3: North-East Corner of Tongjing Lu and Ganjiang Lu
- Exit 4: North-West Corner of Tongjing Lu and Ganjiang Lu
- Exit 5: North-West Corner of Tongjing Lu and Ganjiang Lu

== Local attractions ==
- Suzhou People's Government
- Suzhou People's Procuratorate
- Suzhou Radio and TV University
- Marriott Suzhou Hotel
- HongQiao ShiJia Garden
- HongQiao Merchants Building
- YinTai Garden
- CaiXiang XinCun
- CaiXiang ErCun
- Caixiang Garden
- Suzhou JiangChang Foreign Language School
- DianZi XinCun
- Suzhou Real Estate Building

== Bus Connections ==
- Bus Stop: HongQiao - Connection Bus Routes: 9, 60, 64, 332, 333, 333 LongChi Special Line, 935
- Bus Stop: Guwu Fandian - Connection Bus Routes: 35, 50, 54, 64, 69, 69 Lessened Line, 315, 317, 400, Tour 5
- Bus Stop: CaiXiangXinCun Xi- Connection Bus Routes: 2, 35, 50, 54, 69, 69 Lessened Line, 88, 262, 303, 315, 317, 400, 502, 900, 935, Tour 5
- Bus Stop: CaiXiangXinCun Bei - Connection Bus Routes: 2, 9, 60, 88, 262, 303, 332, 333, 333 LongChi Special Line, 900
