= Guangji Nanlu station =

Metro station in Suzhou, China

Coordinates: 31°18′22″N 120°35′49″E

Guangji Nanlu 广济南路
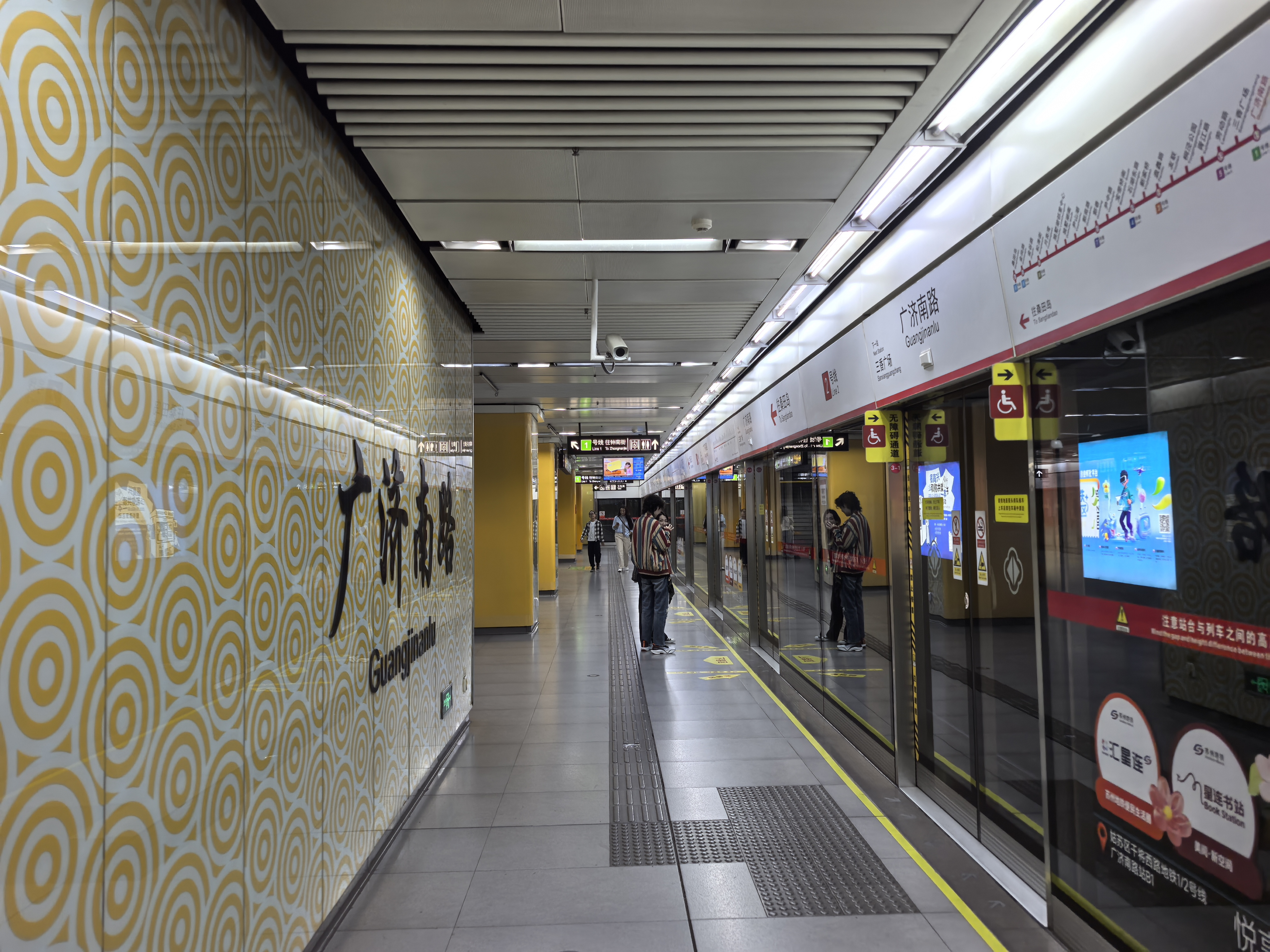
- Platform of Line 2

General information
- Other names: South Guangji Road
- Location: Gusu District, Suzhou, Jiangsu; China
- Operated by: Suzhou Rail Transit Co., Ltd
- Lines: Line 1; Line 2
- Platforms: 4 (2 side platforms (Line 1) and 1 island platform (Line 2))

Construction
- Structure type: Underground
- Accessible: yes

History
- Opened: April 28, 2012 (Line 1); December 23, 2013 (Line 2)

Services
Preceding station	Suzhou Metro	Following station
Tongjing Beilu towards Mudu	Line 1	Yangyu Xiang towards Zhongnanjie
Shi Lu towards Qihe	Line 2	Sanxiang Square towards Sangtiandao
Location

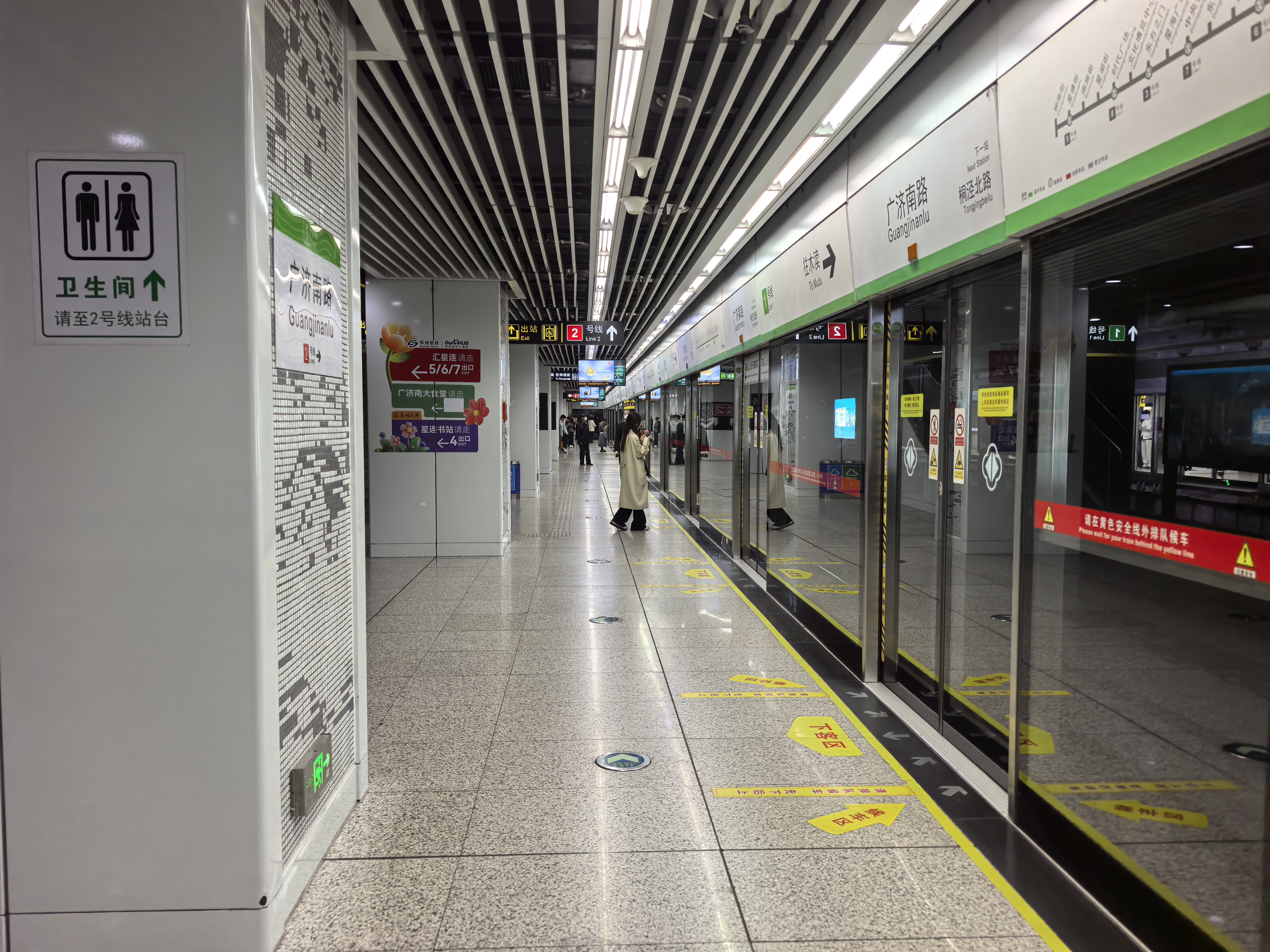
Platform of Line 1

Guangji Nanlu Station (Chinese: 广济南路站) is a station of Line 1 and Line 2 of the Suzhou Metro. The station is located in Gusu District, Suzhou. It began operation on April 28, 2012 with the opening of Line 1. The Line 2 platforms began operation on December 28, 2013 with the opening of Line 2.

The station was the first transfer station of the Suzhou Metro system.

== Station layout ==
L1	Street Level	Entrances/Exits
B1	Mezzanine	Station Control, Customer Service, Fare-gates, Ticketing Machines
B2; Platforms	Side platform, doors will open on the right
B2; Platforms	Eastbound	← Line 1 towards Zhongnan Jie (Yangyu Xiang)
B2; Platforms	Westbound	Line 1 towards Mudu (Tongjing Beilu) →
B2; Platforms	Side platform, doors will open on the right
B3; Platforms	Northbound	← Line 2 towards Qihe (Shi Lu)
B3; Platforms	Island platform, doors will open on the left
B3; Platforms	Southbound	Line 2 towards Sangtiandao (Sanxiang Square) →

== Timetable ==
Destination	First Train	Last Train
Line 1
Zhongnan Jie	06:28	22:18
Mudu	06:38	23:03
Line 2
Suzhou North Railway Station	06:28	22:38
Baodaiqiao South	06:37	22:12

== Exits ==
- 1: Southwest corner of Guangji Lu and Ganjiang Lu
- 2: Southeast corner of Guangji Lu and Ganjiang Lu
- 3: Northeast corner of Guangji Lu and Ganjiang Lu
- 4: Northwest corner of Guangji Lu and Ganjiang Lu, on the side of Ganjiang Lu
- 9: Northwest corner of Guangji Lu and Ganjiang Lu, on the side of Guangji Lu

== Local attractions ==
- Suzhou Rail Transit Headquarters
- Lingtang Xincun
- Dianzi Xincun
- Hongling Garden
- Lijinghuating Garden
- Xichengyongjie Living Plaza
- Suzhou Post Building (Suzhou Post Bureau)
- Youtong Shumagang
- Suzhou Local Taxation Bureau

== Bus connections ==
- Guangji Nanlu bus stop – bus routes 70, 88, 332, 333, 333 Longchi Special Line, 921 and 932
- Fenghuolu Bei bus stop – bus Routes 2, 9, 60, 88, 262, 303, 332, 333, 333 Longchi Special Line and 900
- Changxu Lu bus stop – bus routes 2, 9, 60, 70, 262, 303, 900, 921 and 932
