= Shi Lu station =

Suzhou Metro station

Coordinates: 31°18′49″N 120°35′46″E

Shi Lu 石路
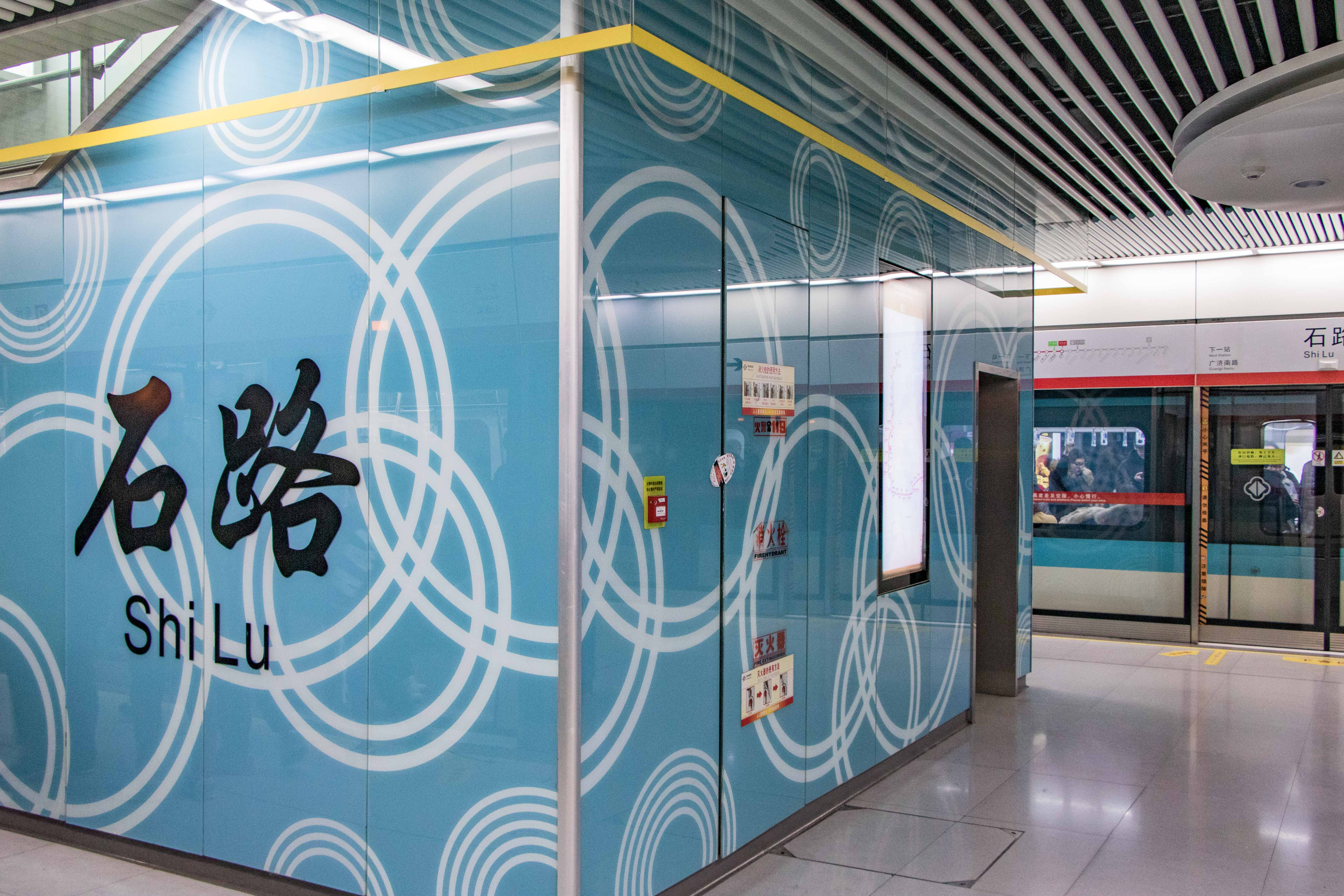
- Platform

General information
- Location: Gusu District, Suzhou, Jiangsu; China
- Operated by: Suzhou Rail Transit Co., Ltd
- Line(s): Line 2
- Platforms: 2 (1 island platform)

Construction
- Structure type: Underground

History
- Opened: December 28, 2013

Services
Preceding station	Suzhou Metro	Following station
Shantang Jie towards Qihe	Line 2	Guangji Nanlu towards Sangtiandao

Shi Lu Station (Chinese: 石路站) is a station on Line 2 of the Suzhou Metro. The station is located in Gusu District of Suzhou. It started service on December 28, 2013, when Line 2 opened.
