= Yangyu Xiang station =

Suzhou Metro station

Coordinates: 31°18′26″N 120°36′36″E

Yangyu Xiang 养育巷
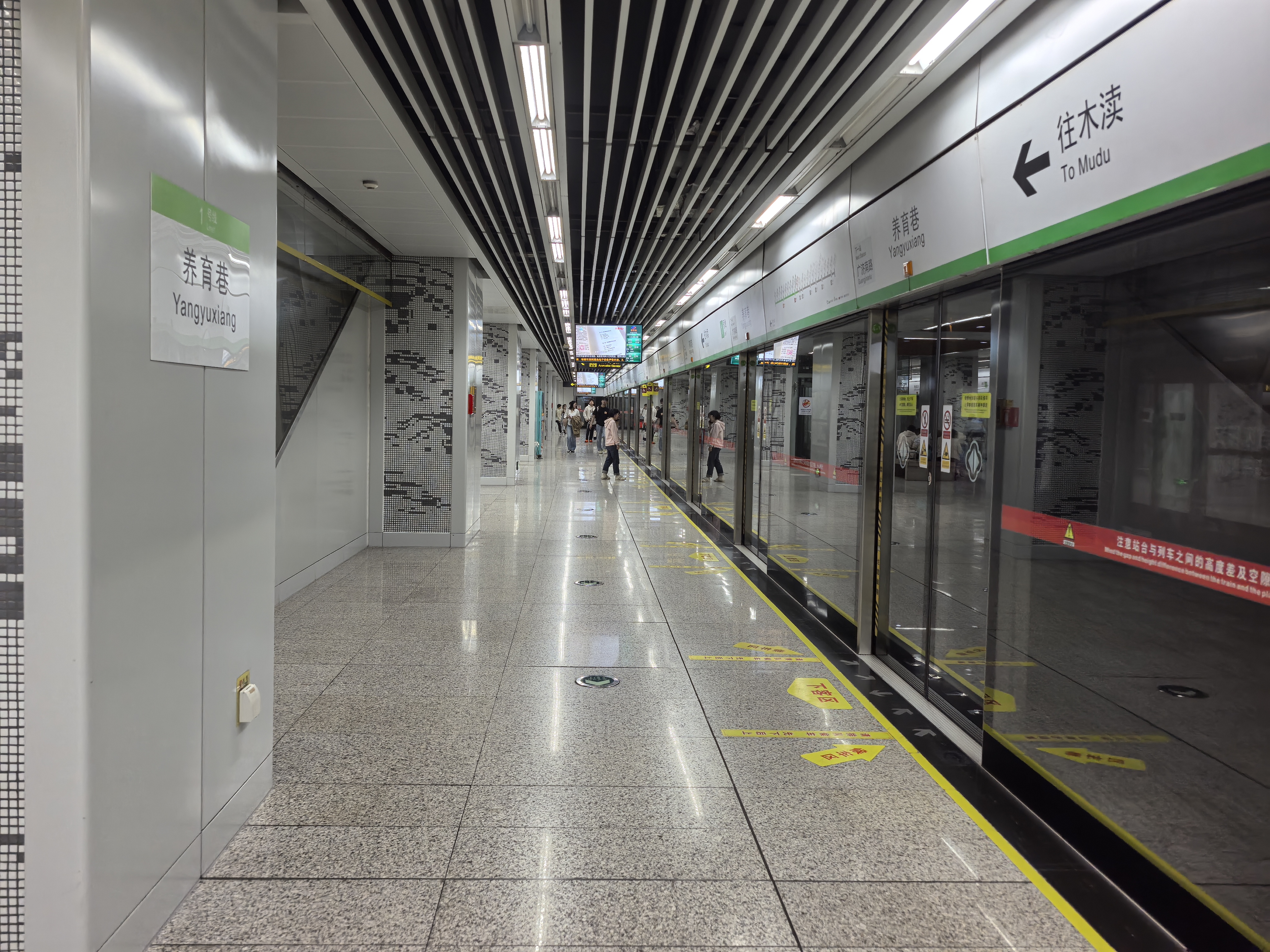

General information
- Other names: Yangyu Lane
- Location: Gusu District, Suzhou, Jiangsu; China
- Operated by: Suzhou Rail Transit Co., Ltd
- Line: Line 1
- Platforms: 2 (1 island platform)

Construction
- Structure type: Underground

History
- Opened: April 28, 2012

Services
Preceding station	Suzhou Metro	Following station
Guangji Nanlu towards Mudu	Line 1	Leqiao towards Zhongnanjie
Location

Yangyu Xiang Station (Chinese: 养育巷站) is a station of Line 1 of the Suzhou Metro. The station is located in Gusu District of Suzhou. It has been in use since April 28, 2012, when Line 1 first opened.

== Station ==
=== Accessible information ===
- Yangyu Xiang Station is a fully accessible station, this station equipped with wheelchair accessible elevators, blind paths with bumps, and wheelchair ramps. These facilities can help people with disabilities, seniors, youths, and pregnancies travel through the Suzhou Metro system.

=== Station configurations ===
L1 (First Floor/Street Level): Entrances/Exits (stairs and escalators); and elevators with wheelchair accessible ramps.

B1 (Mezzanine/Station Hall Level): Station Control Room; Customer Service; Automatic Ticket Vending Machines; Automatic Fee Collection Systems with turnstiles; stairs and escalators; and elevators with wheelchair accessible ramps.

B2 (Platform Level): Platform; toilet; stairs and escalators; elevators with wheelchair accessible ramps.

== Station layout ==
L1	Street Level	Entrances/Exits
B1	Mezzanine	Station Control, Customer Service, Fare-gates, Ticketing Machines
B2; Platform level	To Zhongnan Jie	← Line 1 towards Zhongnan Jie Next Station: Leqiao
B2; Platform level	Island platform, doors will open on the left
B2; Platform level	To Mudu	→Line 1 towards Mudu Next Station: Guangji Nanlu

== First & last trains ==
Directions	First Train	Last Train
Daily
Line 1
Towards Zhongnan Jie Station	06:31	22:21
Towards Mudu Station	06:36	23:01

== Exits information ==
- Exit 1: On the South side of Ganjiang Lu, West of Yangyu Xiang
- Exit 2: On the North side of Ganjiang Lu, West of Yangyu Xiang
- Exit 3: On the North side of Ganjiang Lu, West of Yangyu Xiang

== Local attractions ==
- TongHe XinCun Garden
- TianHe Garden
- LeJia Building
- Suzhou Human Resource Market
- ChuangYuan Commerce Center
- Suzhou Commerce Building
- Bank of China Suzhou Branch Headquarter

== Bus connections ==
- Bus Stop: XueShi Jie - Connection Bus Routes: 2, 9, 60, 307, 800, 900, 923
- Bus Stop: YangYu Xiang - Connection Bus Routes: 2, 9, 60, 146, 305, 307, 800, 900, 923
- Bus Stop: GanJiang Lu- Connection Bus Routes: 305, 602
