= Shuyang railway station =

Railway station in Suqian, Jiangsu

Shuyang 沭阳
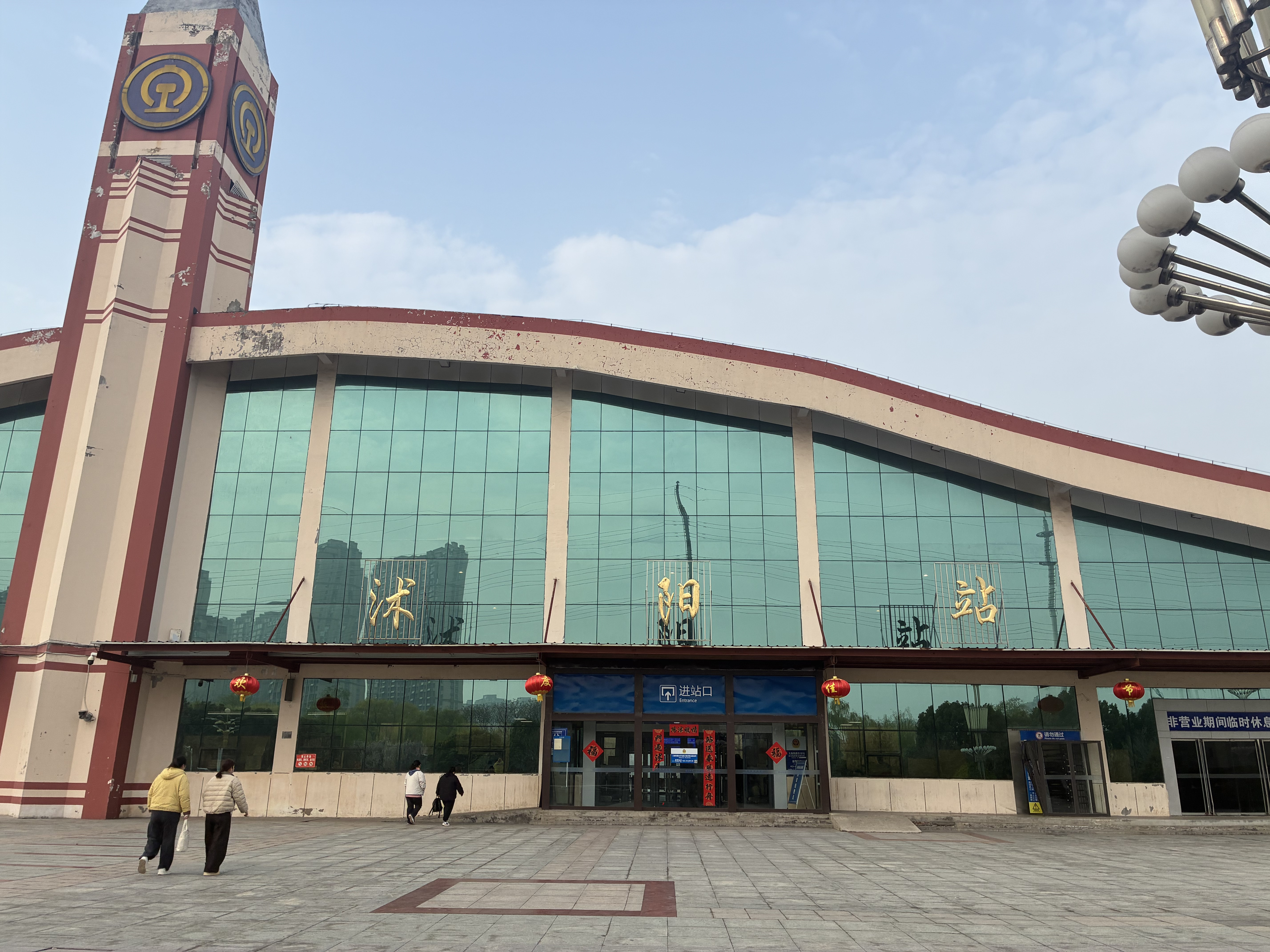
- Station building

General information
- Location: Shuyang County, Suqian, Jiangsu; China
- Coordinates: 34°6′47.21″N 118°45′31.23″E
- Line: Xinyi–Changxing railway

History
- Opened: June 25, 2005
Location

Shuyang railway station (Chinese: 沭阳站) is a railway station in Shuyang County, Suqian, Jiangsu, China. It opened on 25 June 2005.

Preceding station	China Railway	Following station
Xinyi Terminus	Xinyi–Changxing railway	Huai'an towards Changxing South
