= Beijing–Hangzhou high-speed train =

Railway service in China

Beijing–Hangzhou high-speed train 京杭高速动车组列车
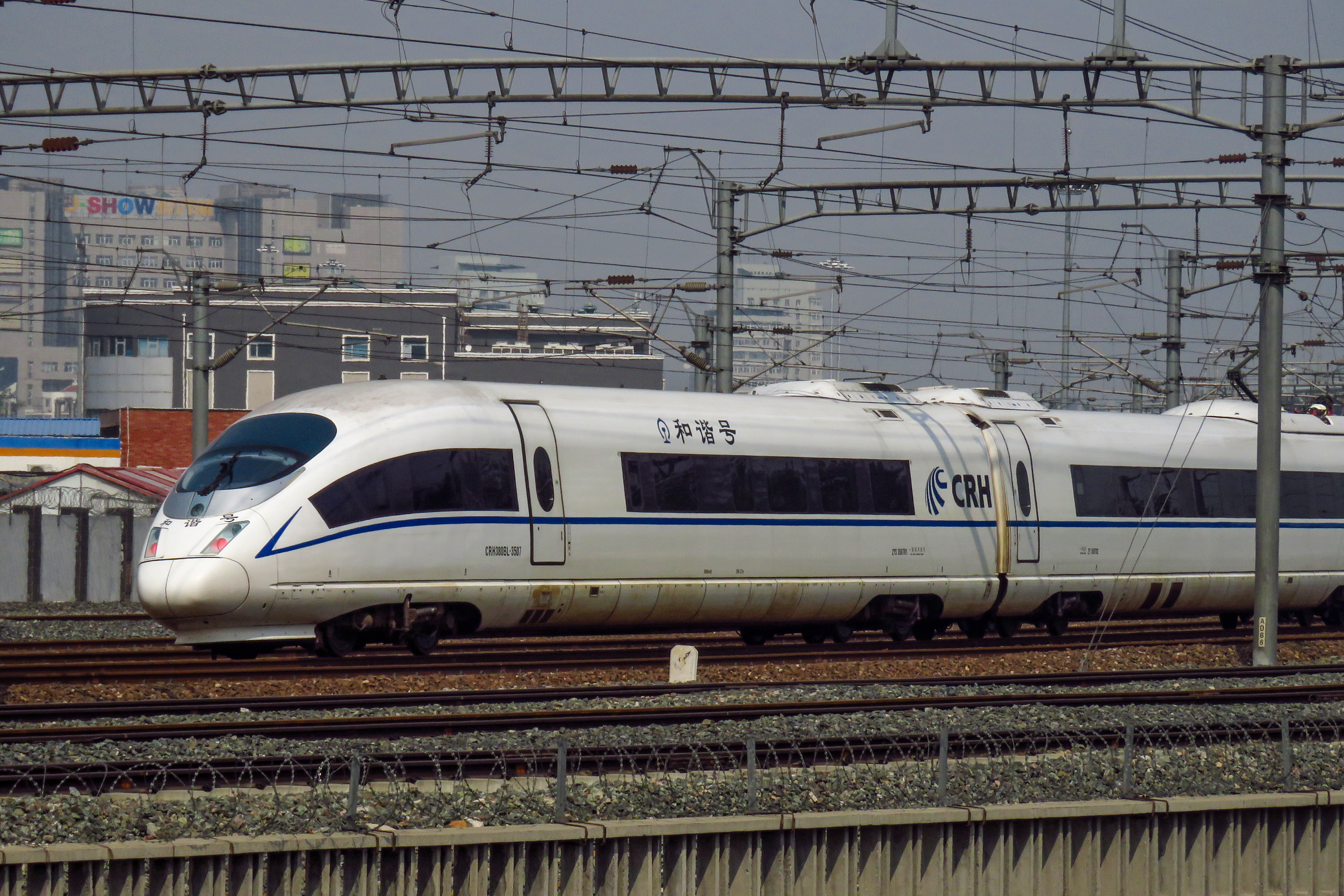
- A CRH380BL EMU on the G34 service approaching Beijing South

Overview
- Service type: G-series trains
- Status: Operational
- Locale: China
- First service: 1 July 2011
- Current operator(s): CR Beijing; CR Shanghai

Route
- Termini: Beijing South: Hangzhou East
- Distance travelled: 1,274 kilometres (792 mi) (G19/20, G31/32, G34, G35/36, G37, G39/40); 1,477 kilometres (918 mi) (G41-44)
- Average journey time: 4h 18m - 6h 53m
- Train number(s): G19/20, G31/32, G34, G35/36, G37, G39/40, G41-44
- Line(s) used: Beijing–Shanghai HSR and Nanjing–Hangzhou HSR (G19/20, G31/32, G34, G35/36, G37, G39/40); Beijing–Shanghai HSR and Shanghai–Hangzhou HSR (G41-44)

On-board services
- Class(es): Business seat; First class seat; Second class seat
- Catering facilities: Dining car; Trolley refreshment service

Technical
- Rolling stock: CRH380AL, CRH380BL, CR400AF, CR400BF
- Track gauge: 1,435 mm (4 ft 8 1/2 in)
- Operating speed: 300 km/h
- Track owner(s): China Railway

The Beijing–Hangzhou high-speed train (京杭高速动车组列车) are high-speed train services between Beijing and Hangzhou, the capital of Zhejiang Province. The trains are operated by CR Beijing and CR Shanghai.

== History ==
The high-speed train services between Beijing and Hangzhou was started on 1 July 2011, when the Beijing–Shanghai HSR was opened. The trains were operated on Beijing–Shanghai HSR and Shanghai–Hangzhou HSR.

With the opening of Nanjing–Hangzhou HSR on 1 July 2013, some of the trains were diverted to Nanjing–Hangzhou HSR instead of Shanghai–Hangzhou HSR.

From 10 April 2018, the G19/20, G31/32 and G39/40 trains have been operating CR400AF and CR400BF trainsets. The operating speed was promoted to 350 kilometres per hour (220 mph) and the travelling time was reduced to 4h 18m.

== Operations ==
The G19/20, G31/32, G34, G35/36, G37 and G39/40 trains were operated on Beijing–Shanghai HSR and Nanjing–Hangzhou HSR. The G41-44 trains were operated on Beijing–Shanghai HSR and Shanghai–Hangzhou HSR, via Shanghai Hongqiao.

The G39/40 trains are the fastest trains between Beijing and Hangzhou, with only one intermediate stop at Nanjing South.

== Rolling stocks ==
The services are operated by CRH380B, CRH380BL, CR400AF and CR400BF trainsets.

=== CRH380B ===
The CRH380B trainsets on this service have the formation shown below.

Car No.	1	2-3	4	5	6-7	8
Type	ZYS; Business/first class	ZE; Second class	ZE; Second class	ZEC; Second class/dining car	ZE; Second class	ZES; Business/second class

=== CRH380BL ===
The 16-car CRH380BL trainsets are the most common on this service.

Car No.	1	2	3	4	5	6-8	9	10-15	16
Type	ZYS; Business/first class	ZY; First class	SW; Business	ZY; First class	ZE; Second class	ZE; Second class	CA; Dining car	ZE; Second class	ZYS; Business/first class

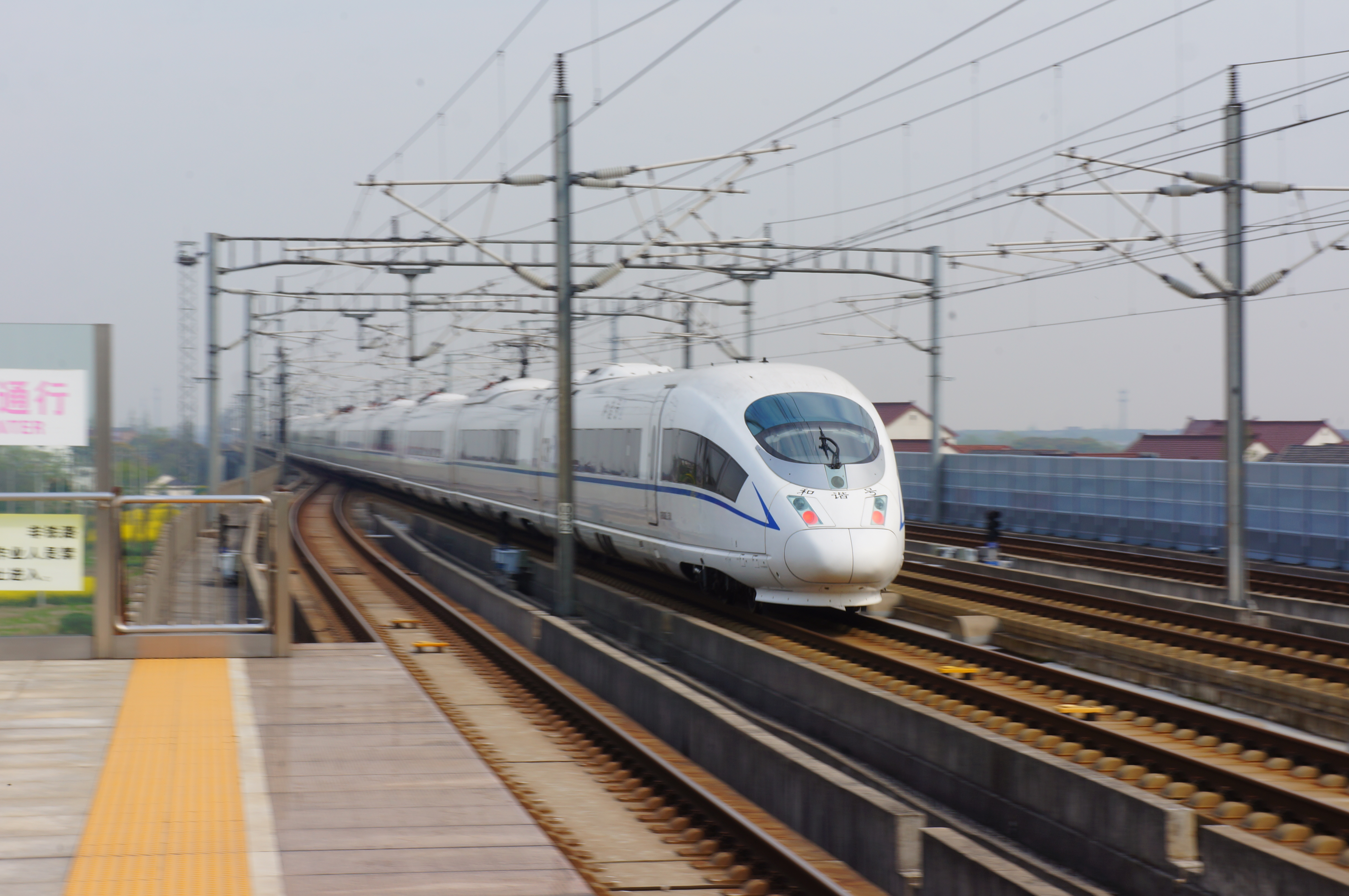
A CRH380B EMU on G20 service passing Changxing

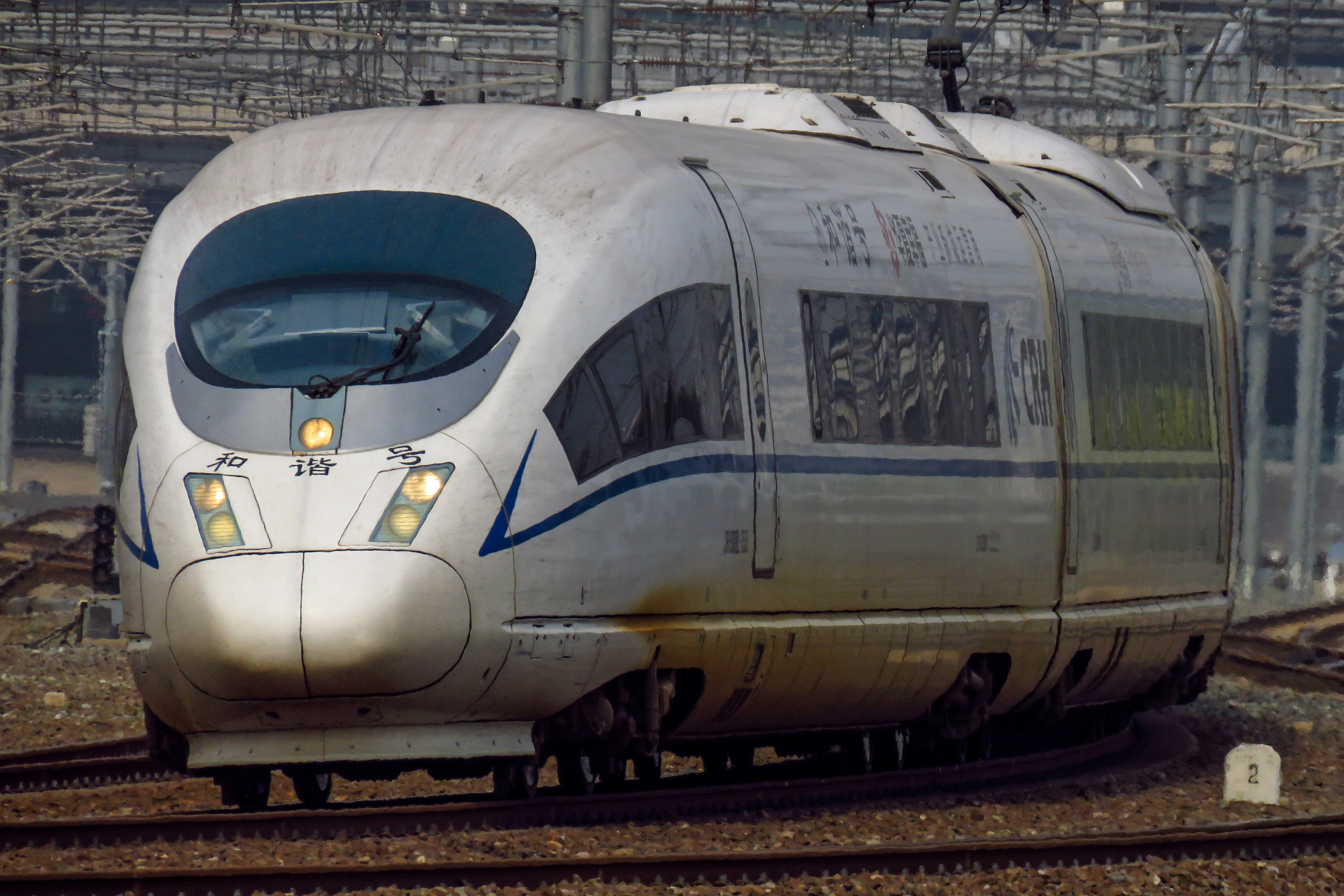
A CRH380BL EMU on G43 service leaving Beijing South

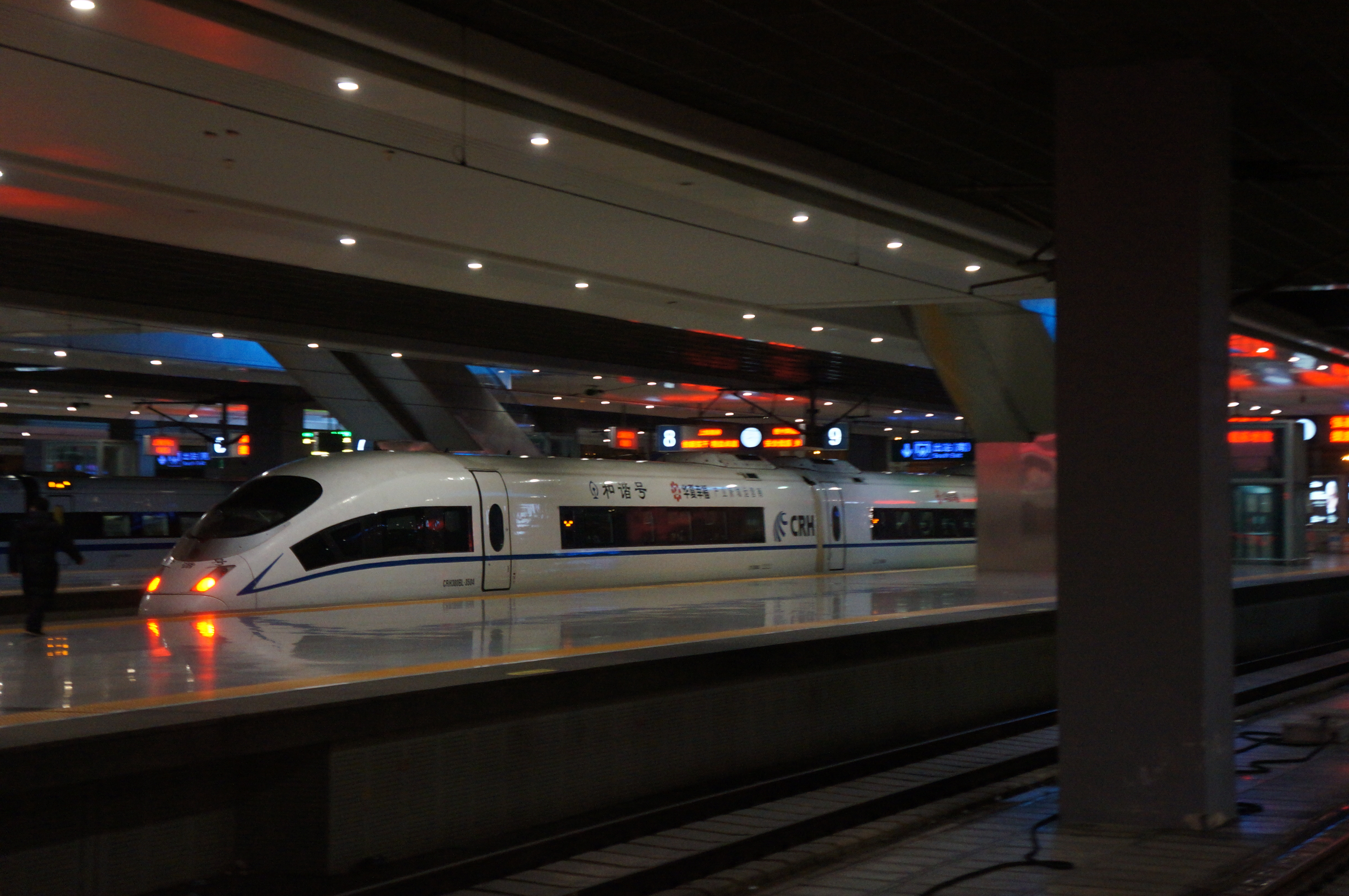
A CRH380BL EMU on G43 service at Shanghai Hongqiao

=== CR400AF and CR400BF ===
The G19/20, G31/32 and G39/40 trains were operated by CR400AF and CR400BF trainsets.

Car No.	1	2-3	4	5	6-7	8
Type	ZYS; Business/first class	ZE; Second class	ZE; Second class	ZEC; Second class/dining car	ZE; Second class	ZES; Business/second class

=== CR400BF-A ===
The G41/44 train were operated by CR400BF-A trainsets.

Car No.	1	2	3-7	8	9	10-14	15	16
Type	SW; Business	ZY; First class	ZE; Second class	ZE; Second class	ZEC; Second class/dining car	ZE; Second class	ZY; First class	ZYS; Business/first class

=== Previously used rolling stocks ===
- CRH380AL: From April 2017, due to the maintenance of some of the CRH380BL and CRH380CL EMUs, the G41/44 trains temporarily used CRH380AL EMUs for operation.
- CRH380D: The G42/39 train used CRH380D trainsets in 2015, but was changed to CRH380BL in 2016.
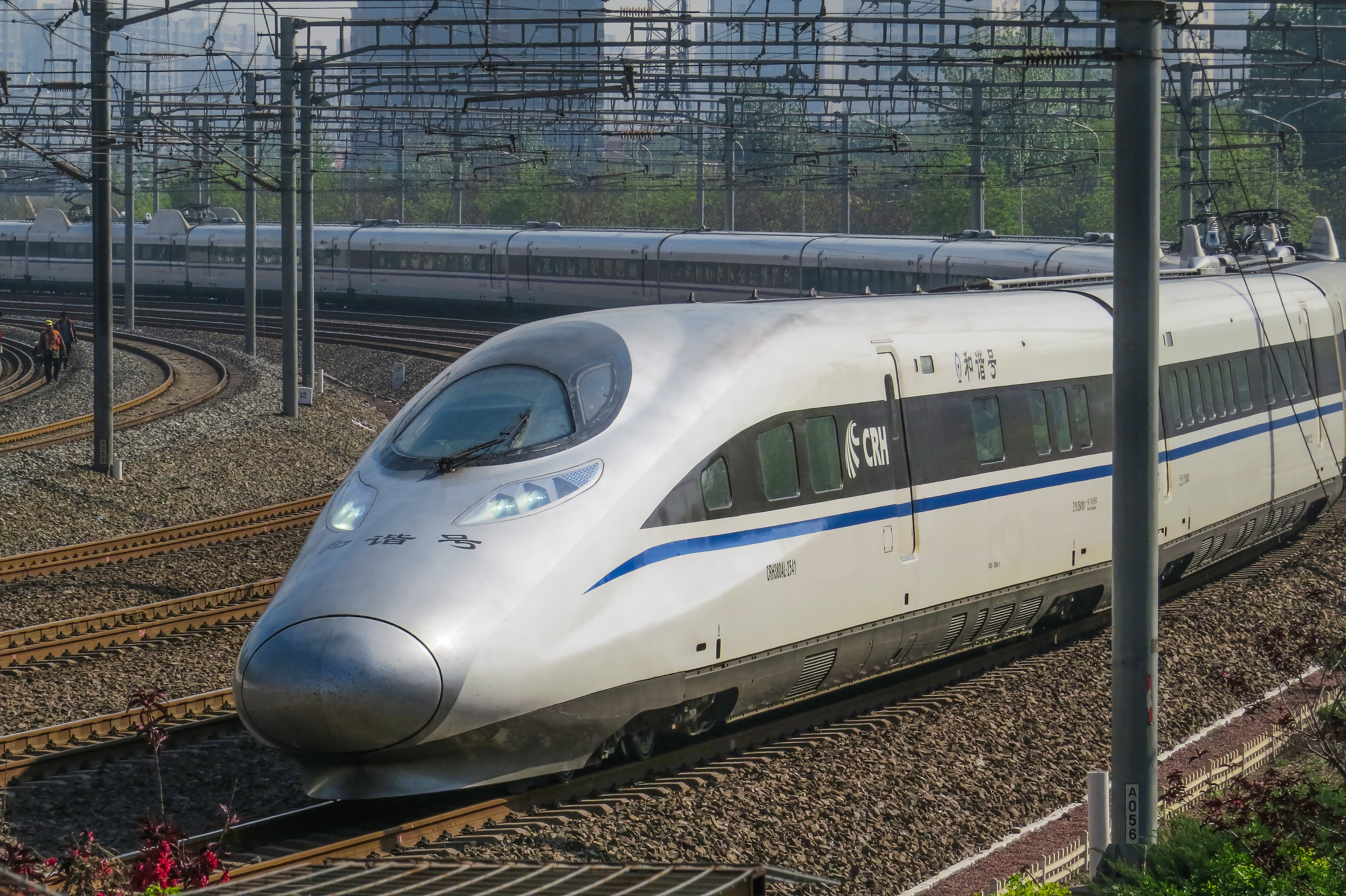
A CRH380AL EMU on G41 service in Apr. 2017

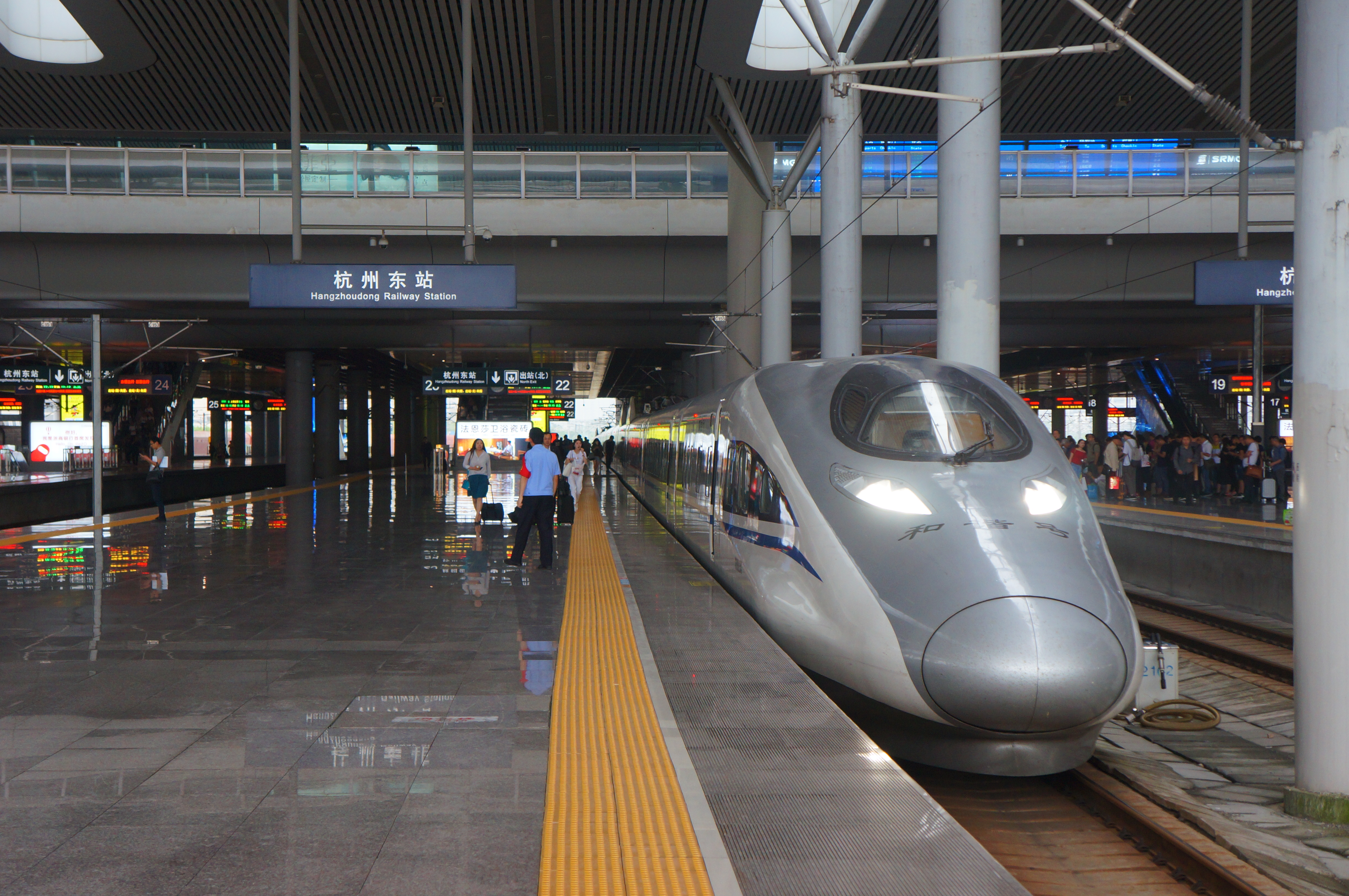
A CRH380AL EMU on G44 service in May 2017

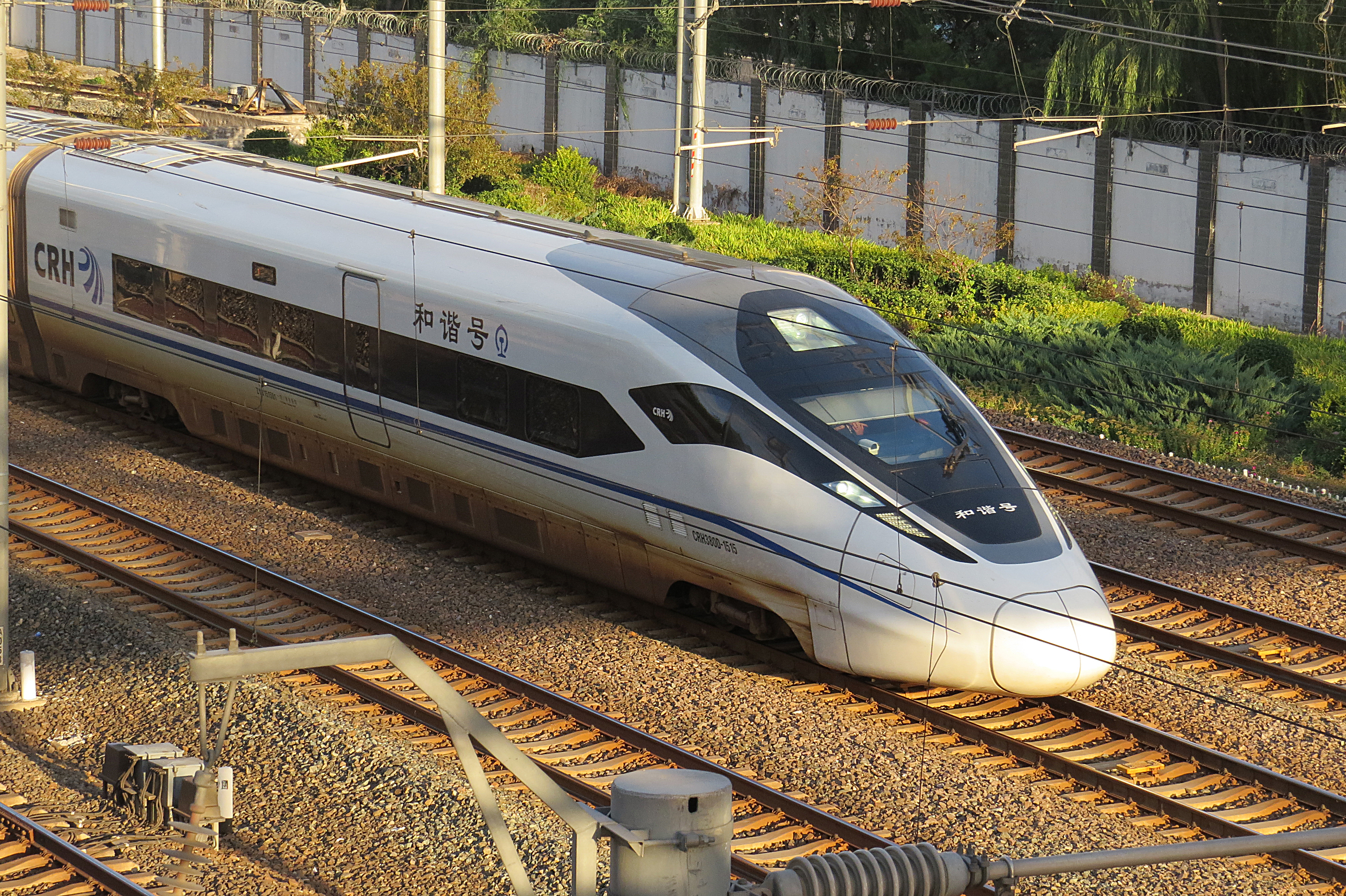
A CRH380D EMU on G39 service in Oct. 2015
