= Xinyi railway station =

Railway station in Xuzhou, China

Xinyi 新沂

General information
- Location: 88 Xuhai Road; Xinyi, Xuzhou, Jiangsu; China
- Coordinates: 34.3819°N 118.3432°E
- Operator: CR Shanghai
- Lines: Longhai railway; Jiaozhou–Xinyi railway; Xinyi–Changxing railway
- Platforms: 3 (1 side platform and 1 island platform)
- Tracks: 6
- Connections: Bus terminal

Other information
- Station code: 38561 (TMIS code); VIH (telegraph code); XYI (Pinyin code)
- Classification: Class 2 station (二等站)

History
- Opened: 1925
- Former names: Xin'anzhen (Chinese: 新安镇)
Location
- Location within Jiangsu Location within China

Xinyi railway station (Chinese: 新沂站) is a station on Longhai railway in Xinyi, Xuzhou, Jiangsu.

== History ==
The station was established in 1925.

Formerly named as Xin'anzhen railway station (Chinese: 新安镇站), the station was changed to the current name in 1952, to differentiate it from Xin'an County in Luoyang, Henan.

Preceding station	China Railway	Following station
Donghaixian towards Lianyungang East	Longhai railway	Pizhou towards Lanzhou
Tancheng towards Jiaozhou	Jiaozhou–Xinyi railway	Terminus
Terminus	Xinyi–Changxing railway	Shuyang towards Changxing South
