= Deqing railway station =

Railway station in Huzhou, Zhejiang

Deqing 德清
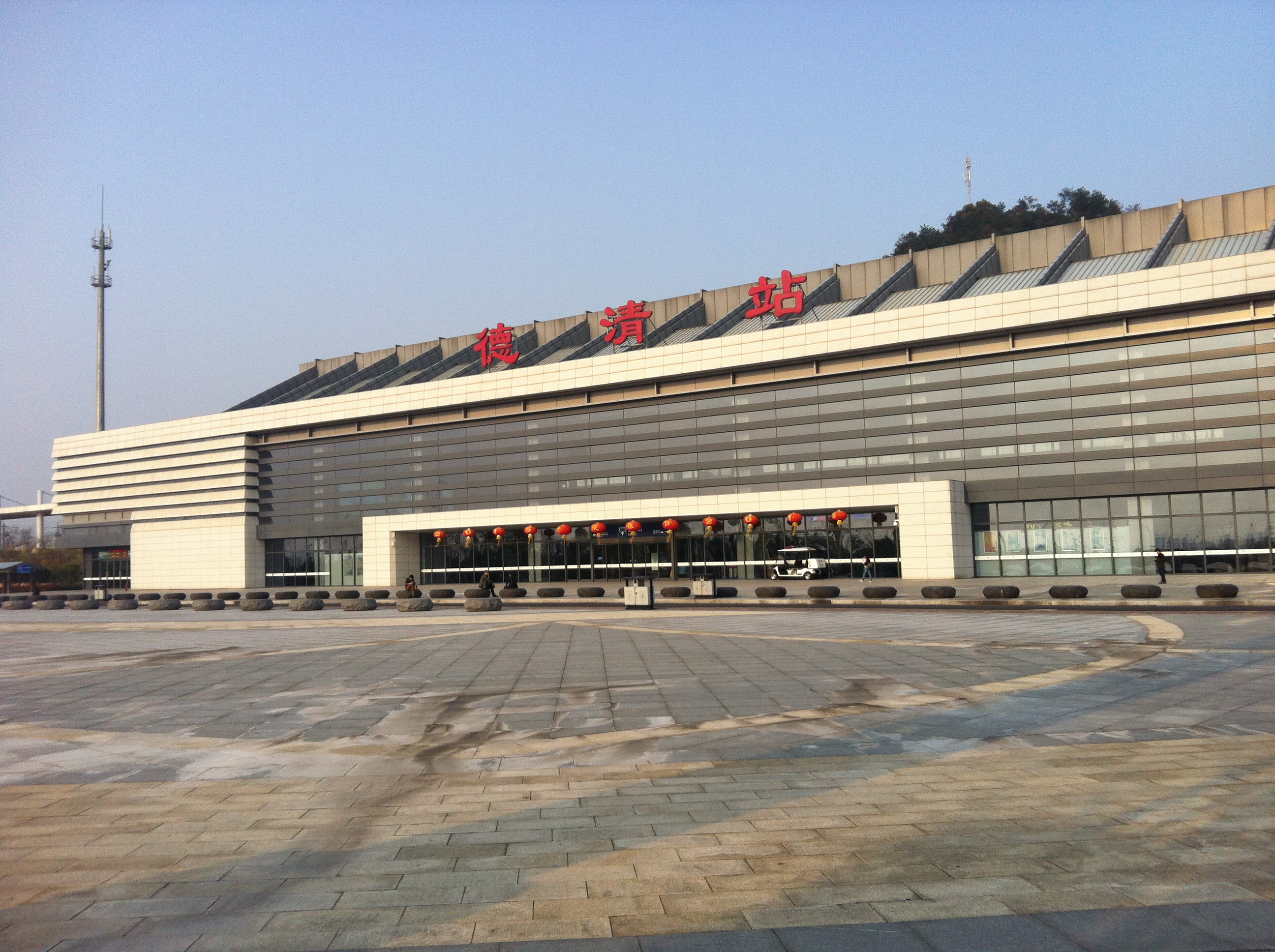

General information
- Location: Deqing County, Huzhou, Zhejiang; China
- Coordinates: 30°33′N 120°04′E
- Lines: Nanjing–Hangzhou high-speed railway; Shangqiu–Hangzhou high-speed railway (Huzhou–Hangzhou section)

History
- Opened: 1 June 2013
Location

Deqing railway station (Chinese: 德清站) is a railway station in Deqing County, Huzhou, Zhejiang, China. It opened on 1 July 2013 with the Nanjing–Hangzhou high-speed railway. It is also served by Shangqiu–Hangzhou high-speed railway (Huzhou–Hangzhou section).

== Other stations in Deqing County ==
It is one of two railway stations in Deqing County, the other being Deqing East on the Xuancheng–Hangzhou railway.

Preceding station	China Railway High-speed	Following station
Huzhou towards Nanjing South	Nanjing–Hangzhou high-speed railway	Hangzhou East Terminus
Huzhou towards Shangqiu	Shangqiu–Hangzhou high-speed railway	Hangzhou West towards Tonglu
