= Liyang railway station =

Railway station in Liyang, China

Liyang 溧阳
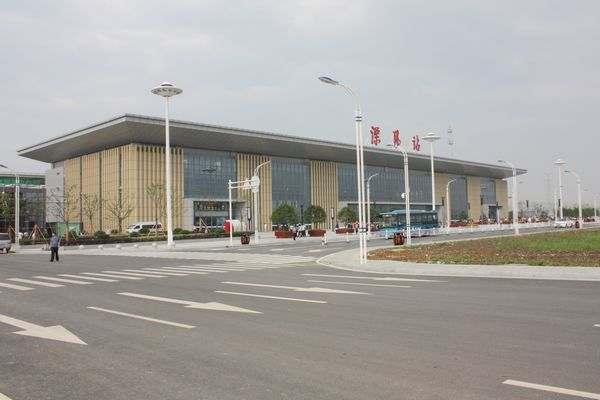

General information
- Location: Yancheng Avenue (燕城大道), Liyang, Jiangsu; China
- Coordinates: 31°23′17″N 119°29′52″E
- Operated by: China Railway Corporation; Shanghai Railway Bureau
- Line: Nanjing–Hangzhou High-Speed Railway
- Platforms: 2 (island platforms(unused sides of island platforms))
- Connections: Bus routes 6,22,23,29,108

Other information
- Station code: 31715

History
- Opened: July 1, 2013

Passengers
- 4500 daily
Location

The Liyang railway station (simplified Chinese: 溧阳站; traditional Chinese: 溧陽站; pinyin: Lìyáng Zhàn) is a high-speed railway station on the Ninghang Passenger Railway. The station is located in Liyang, Jiangsu, China.

The Liyang railway station is located 5 kilometres south of downtown Liyang. The construction of the railway station began on July 21, 2010. It was opened on July 1, 2013, simultaneously with the opening of the Nanjing–Hangzhou Passenger Railway line.

The railway station takes a total area of 7983 square meters and has 2 platforms. The main building of the train station measures 141.4 meters in length, 38.3 meters in width, and 18 meters high.

Preceding station	China Railway High-speed	Following station
Wawushan towards Nanjing South	Nanjing–Hangzhou high-speed railway	Yixing towards Hangzhou East
