= Liyang Guanghua Senior High School =

School in Liyang, China

Location
- Liyang, Jiangsu; China
- Coordinates: 32°14′6″N 120°45′45″E

Information
- Type: Comprehensive school
- Established: 1939
- Principal: Liu Zhiwei (刘志伟)
- Staff: 181
- Teaching staff: 146
- Campus size: 52,600 square metres (13.0 acres)
- Website: ghzx.com.cn

Liyang Guanghua Senior High School is a school located in the southern Chinese city of Liyang.

== History ==
In August 1939, the school was established by Chen Yi, Su Yu, and others.

== Resources ==
The school covers 52,619 square meters. There are 36 classes, with nearly two thousand students. It has an art room and a music room. For sport, there is a basketball court, table tennis room, and dance room.
