= Dafeng Port railway =

Railway line in Jiangsu, China

Dafeng Port railway (Chinese: 大丰港铁路; pinyin: Dàfēnggǎng Tiělù) is a branch from the Xinyi–Changxing railway situated in Yancheng, Jiangsu, China. The railway will be 50.6 kilometres (31.4 mi) long. Construction started on 27 September 2022.

== Route ==
Dafeng Port railway leaves the Xinyi–Changxing railway south of Dafeng West railway station and heads east towards the coast.
