= Xinyi–Changxing railway =

Railway line in China

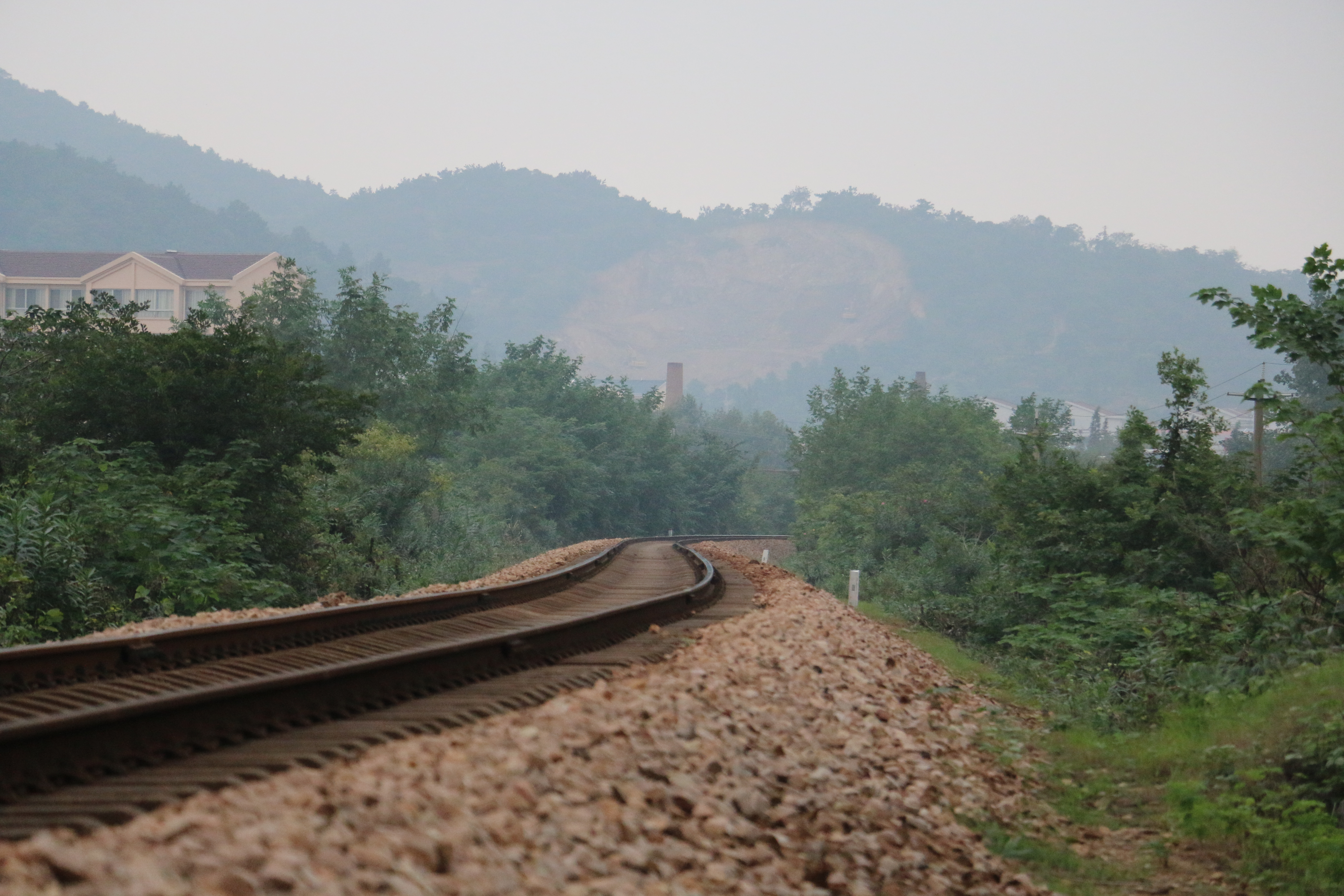
- Xinchang railway in Yixing

Overview
- Other name(s): Xinchang railway 新长铁路
- Status: Operating
- Owner: Xinchang Railway Company
- Locale: Jiangsu and Zhejiang provinces
- Termini: Xinyi; Changxing South
- Stations: 37

Service
- Operator: China Railway Shanghai Group

History
- Opened: January 2003 (freight); July 2005 (passengers: Huai'an–Hai'an)

Technical
- Line length: 561 kilometres (349 mi)
- Number of tracks: 1
- Track gauge: 1,435 mm (4 ft 8 1/2 in)
- Minimum radius: 1,000 metres (3,300 ft); 450 metres (1,480 ft) in difficult sections

The Xinyi–Changxing railway or Xinchang railway (simplified Chinese: 新长铁路; traditional Chinese: 新長鐵路; pinyin: Xīn–Cháng tiělù), also known as the Xinchang line (simplified Chinese: 新长线; traditional Chinese: 新長線; pinyin: Xīncháng xiàn), is a single-track railway line in eastern China between the cities of Xinyi in Jiangsu Province and Changxing County in Zhejiang Province. It runs north-south through the entire length of Jiangsu Province and the northern tip of Zhejiang. Major cities along route include Huai'an, Yancheng, Hai'an, Jingjiang, Jiangyin and Yixing. Including a 62.5 km (38.8 mi) spur from Hai'an to Nantong, the Xinchang railway is 638 km (396 mi) in total length. It used a train ferry to cross the Yangtze River, but this closed in 2019. Passenger services south of Hai'an have also been abandoned. The Yancheng–Yixing intercity railway, which is due to open in about 2030, will offer passenger services to some of the places formerly served by this line.

== History ==
The Xinchang railway was the first railway to be built in Jiangsu Province north of the Yangtze River. Construction began in September 1998 and the entire line was completed in April 2005. Passenger and freight service commenced on July 1, 2005. A connection to Nantong (a section of the Nanjing–Qidong railway) was added in 2008. The train ferry closed on 16 December 2019. Passenger services south of Hai'an have also been abandoned.

== Route ==
The Xinchang railway connects with the Longhai and Jiaozhou–Xinyi railways in the north and with the Nanjing–Nantong, Beijing–Shanghai, Xuancheng–Hangzhou railways in the south.

Until 2019, the Xinchang line was the only major inland rail line in China to use a river ferry. As the railway has no bridge or tunnel crossing at the Yangtze River, trains had to be ferried across the river from Jingjiang on the northern side of the river (terminal at 31°58′33″N 120°18′27″E) to Jiangyin on the southern side (terminal at 31°57′16″N 120°19′25″E). At its peak, a pair of ferries made 48 trips per day across the river.
