= Yixing railway station =

Railway station in Wuxi, Jiangsu

Yixing 宜兴
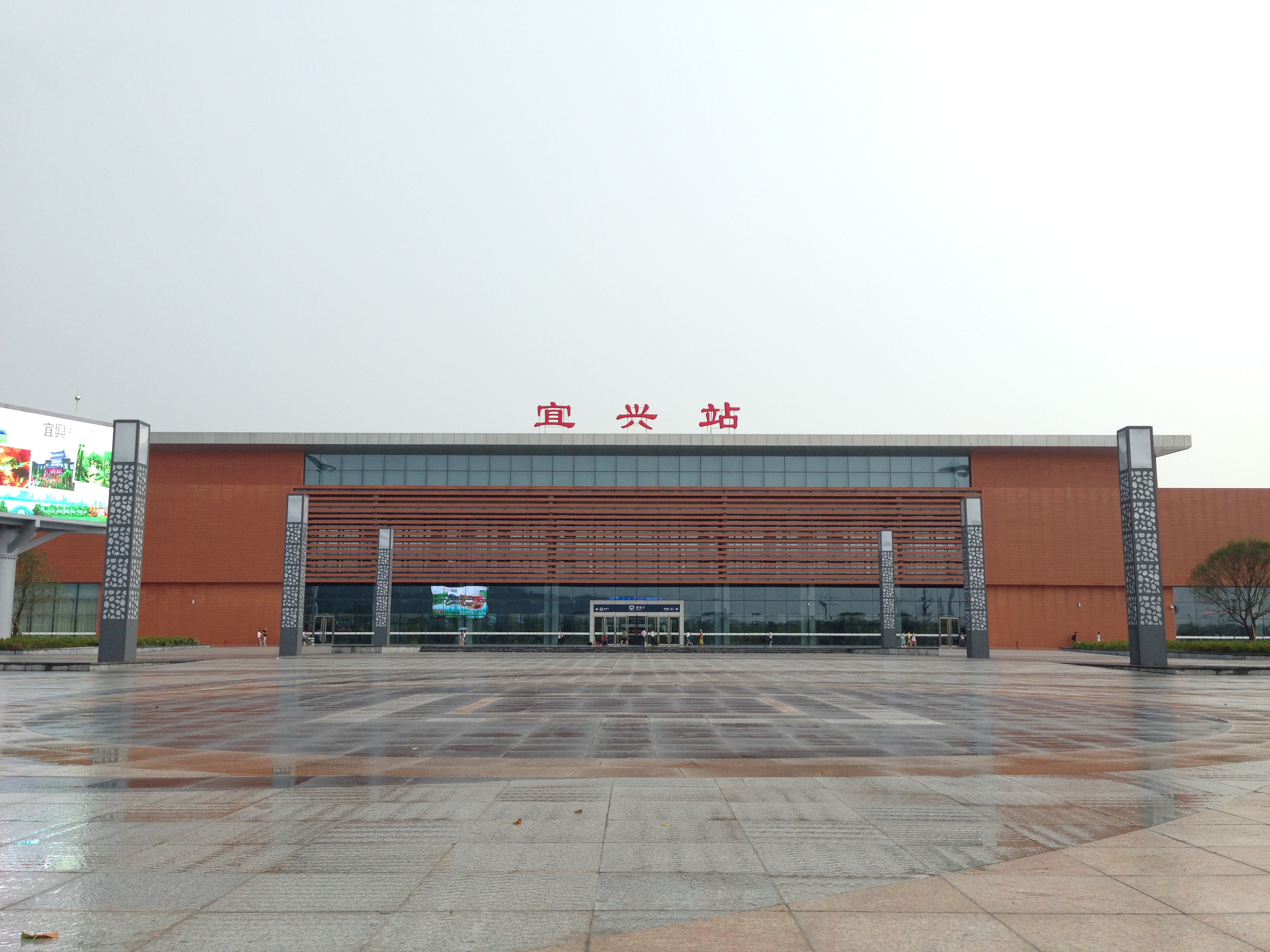

General information
- Location: Yixing, Wuxi, Jiangsu; China
- Coordinates: 31°18′52.26″N 119°48′31.97″E
- Lines: Nanjing–Hangzhou high-speed railway; Yancheng–Yixing intercity railway (planned)

History
- Opened: 1 July 2013
Location

Yixing railway station (Chinese: 宜兴站) is a railway station in Yixing, Wuxi, Jiangsu, China. It is an intermediate stop on the Nanjing–Hangzhou high-speed railway. It opened with the line on 1 July 2013.

Yixing Station is a second-class station under the jurisdiction of China Railway Shanghai Bureau Group Co., Ltd. It is an intermediate station of Ninghang high-speed railway and the terminal station of the future Yancheng–Yixing intercity railway. With its construction, Yixing Station will be renovated and its platform and station building will be expanded.

Preceding station	China Railway High-speed	Following station
Liyang towards Nanjing South	Nanjing–Hangzhou high-speed railway	Changxing towards Hangzhou East
