= Jingjiang railway station =

Railway station in Jingjiang, Taizhou, Jiangsu

Jingjiang 靖江

General information
- Location: Jingjiang, Taizhou, Jiangsu; China
- Coordinates: 32°02′02″N 120°17′59″E
- Line: Xinyi–Changxing railway
Location

Jingjiang railway station (Chinese: 靖江站) is a railway station in Jingjiang, Taizhou, Jiangsu, China. It is an intermediate stop on the Xinyi–Changxing railway.

In 2005, a passenger service of one train in each direction per day was introduced. However, it was discontinued after two months due to low usage. The infrequent service combined with the lack of public transport to the railway station were blamed for the low passenger numbers. The station buildings still stand.
