= Tianmu Lake =

- 天目湖 (Chinese)
- Location within Jiangsu
- Location: Liyang, Jiangsu
- Coordinates: 31°17′22.6″N 119°25′11.9″E
- Type: lake

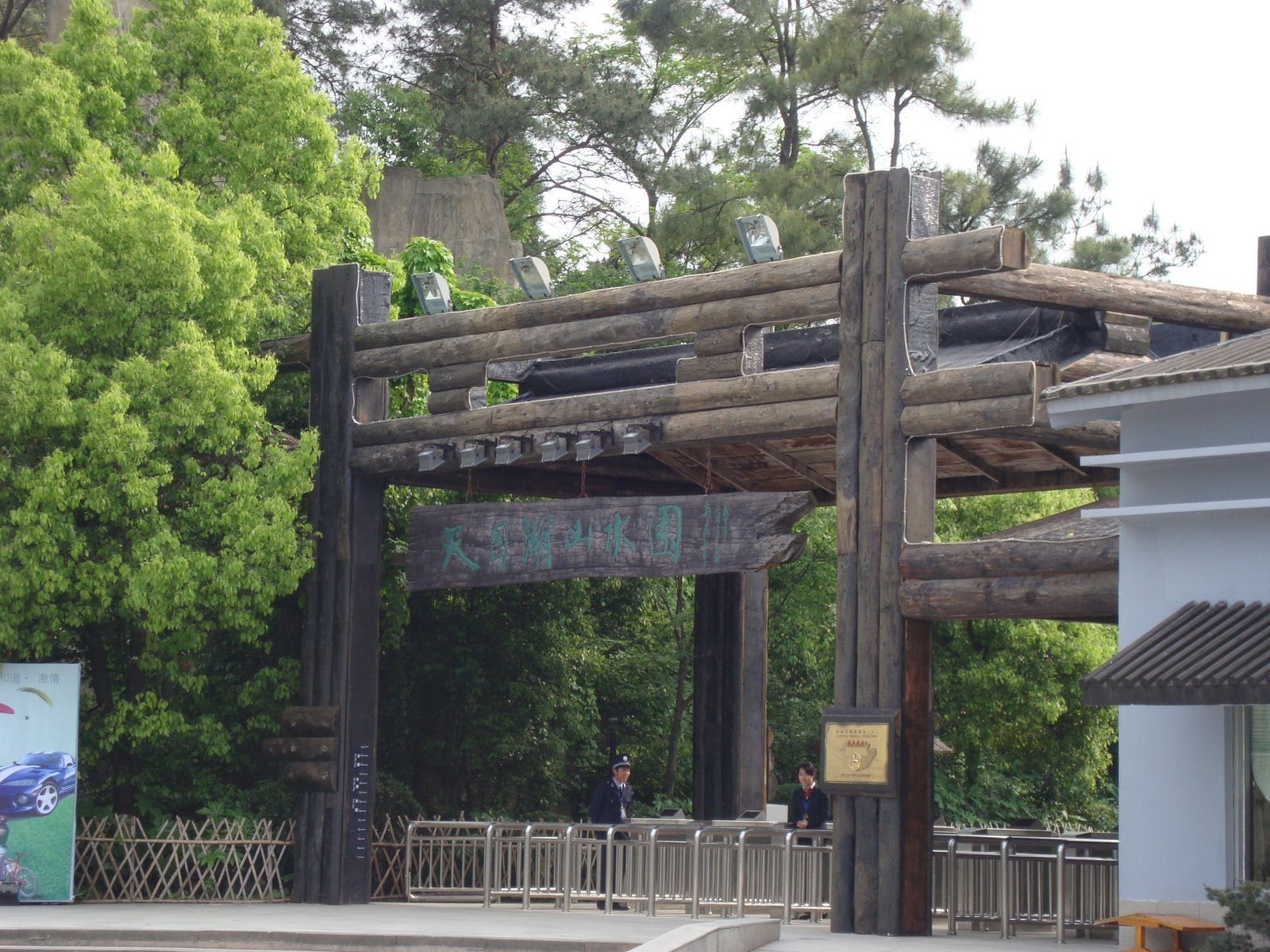
Tianmu Lake gate

Tianmu Lake (Chinese: 天目湖; pinyin: Tiānmù Hú) is a lake which is 8 km (5.0 mi) south of Liyang City in Jiangsu Province, China. It was listed as a provincial tourist resort in 1993 and is currently graded an AAAA nature reserve after being graded as such in 2001. The lake covers an area of 300 km^{2} (120 sq mi), and its depth ranges from an average of 10 feet (3.0 m) to a maximum of 28 feet (8.5 m). The lake enjoys a legal conservation status, and since the municipal government took action in 1995 to overhaul the sewage disposal systems around the lake, the water quality has been in a good condition, achieving the second highest rating for water quality. As such, the lake is home to many freshwater fish such as cod.

== Surrounding area ==
In the surrounding area of the lake (known as the Tianmu Lake Scenic Area), wild animals such as mallard, pheasant and wild boar live. Some animals are also kept in captivity and fed by humans, such as a camel. The largest production of this area is tea. The production of tea each year here reaches 1,000 metric tons (980 long tons; 1,100 short tons). Around the lake, there are also two other China AAAA-level tourist resort called "South Hill Bamboo Sea" (also called NanShan Zhu Hai) and "Yushui Hot Spring".

== South Hill Bamboo Sea ==
South Hill Bamboo Sea (Chinese: 南山竹海 or in pinyin Nanshan Zhuhai), south of Tianmu Lake, is an area of 35 thousand acres of millions of bamboo plants, flowing streams and a sculpture. The Bamboo Culture Park provides information about the cultural meaning of bamboo. It also offers mountain climbing.
