= Nanshan Zhuhai =

Ecological area in Liyang, China

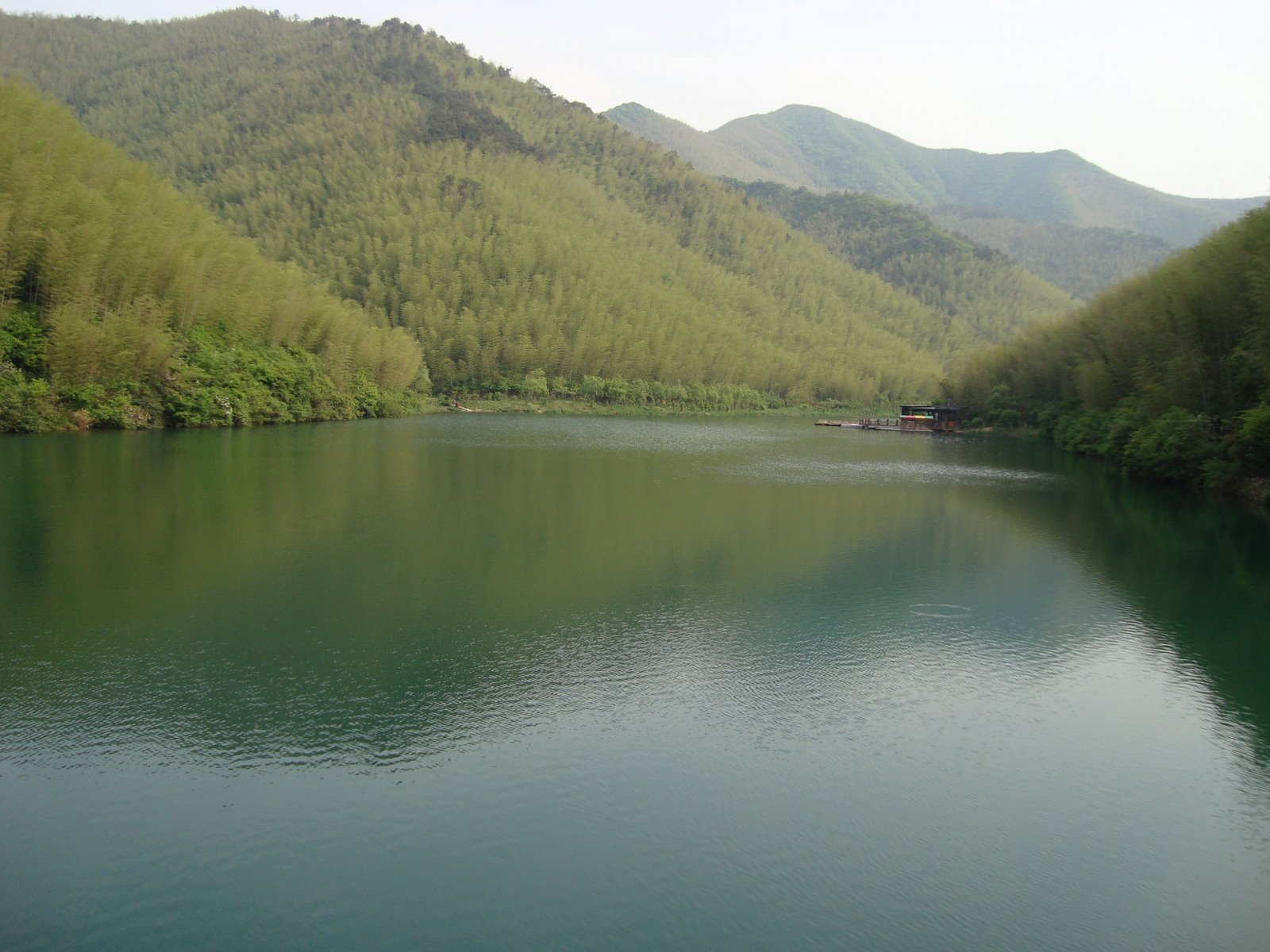

Nanshan Zhuhai (Chinese: 南山竹海, or literally the "South Mountain Bamboo Sea," national AAAAA tourist area) is an ecological tourist area in the southern mountains of the county level city of Liyang, Jiangsu province, China. This tourist area has been open to the public since 2000 and is in close proximity to Tianmu Lake (天目湖), another ecological tourist area. Aside from tourism, Nanshan Zhuhai is also known for its ecological sound use of resources, protection of local habitats and ecology, and its picturesque landscape. With about 2,300 hectares (5,700 acres) of bamboo, this "bamboo sea" serves as its most important feature and attracts a stream of tourists every year. Tickets cost 90 RMB (about US$15) and admission is free for children who are shorter than 1.2 m and the elderly who are more than 70 years old. The scenic spot opens from 8 a.m. to 5 p.m. The area includes Seazan head, JinNiuLing, the ancient GuanDao, and ancient military sites. The site's five functional zones include a lake entertainment district, a recreational area, a historic area, and a longevity culture area and mountaineering recreational area.
