= Changxing railway station =

Railway station in Huzhou, China

Changxing 长兴
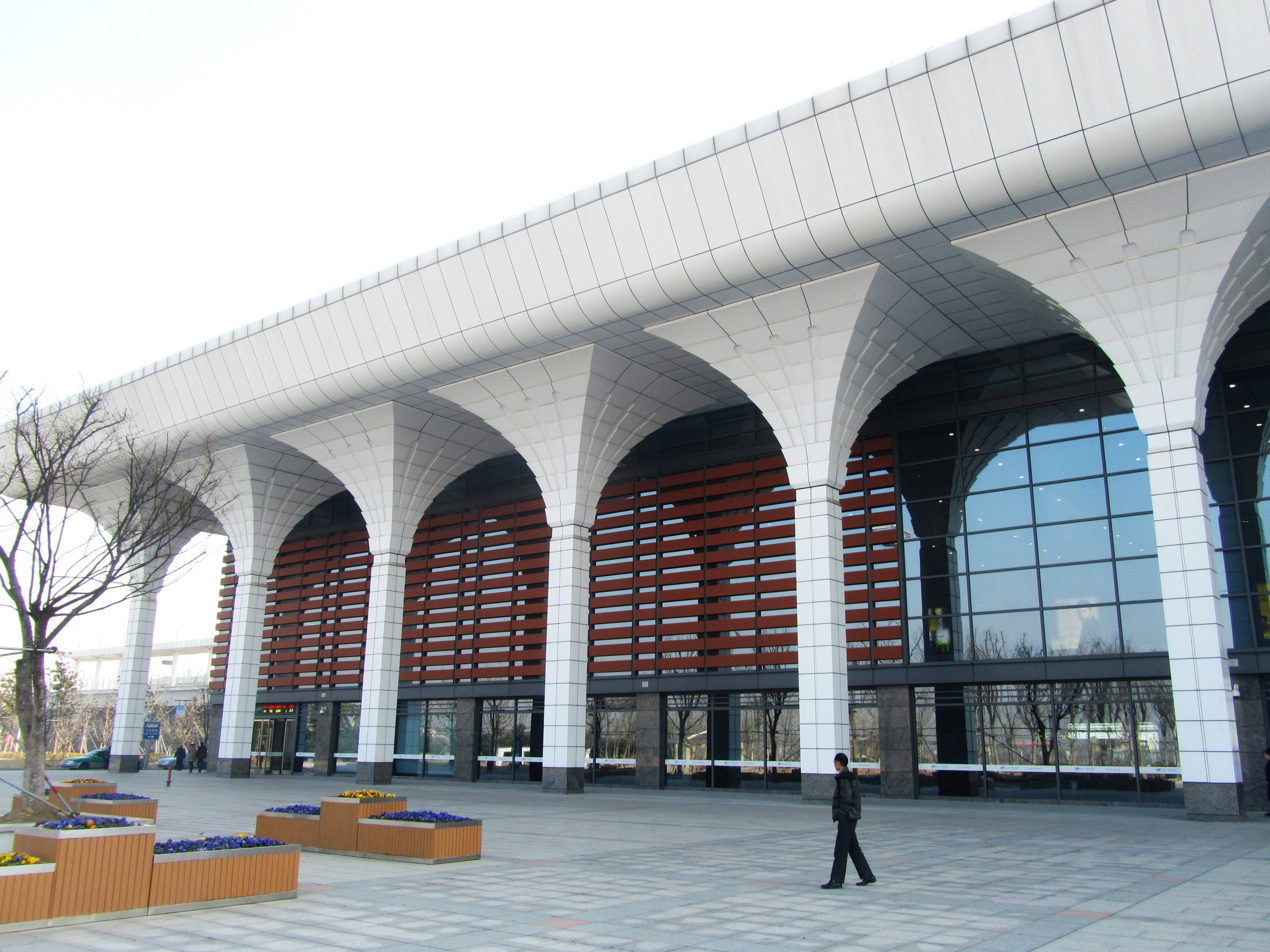
- Changxing railway station

General information
- Location: Changxing County, Huzhou, Zhejiang; China
- Coordinates: 31.0443°N 119.9703°E
- System: High speed rail
- Platforms: 2

Other information
- Station code: TMIS code: 31721; Telegraph code: CBH; Pinyin code: CXI

History
- Opened: 1 July 2013
Location

Changxing railway station (Chinese: 长兴站) is a high-speed railway station located in northeast Changxing County, Huzhou, Zhejiang, China, serving the Nanjing–Hangzhou high-speed railway. It is served by high-speed trains whereas Changxing South is served by conventional trains.

== History ==
Construction on the station began in August 2010. With the construction of the Nanjing–Hangzhou high-speed railway, the original Changxing railway station was renamed Changxing South in 2012. The station opened on 1 July 2013.

Preceding station	China Railway High-speed	Following station
Yixing towards Nanjing South	Nanjing–Hangzhou high-speed railway	Huzhou towards Hangzhou East
