= Huzhou railway station =

Railway station in Huzhou, Zhejiang

Huzhou 湖州
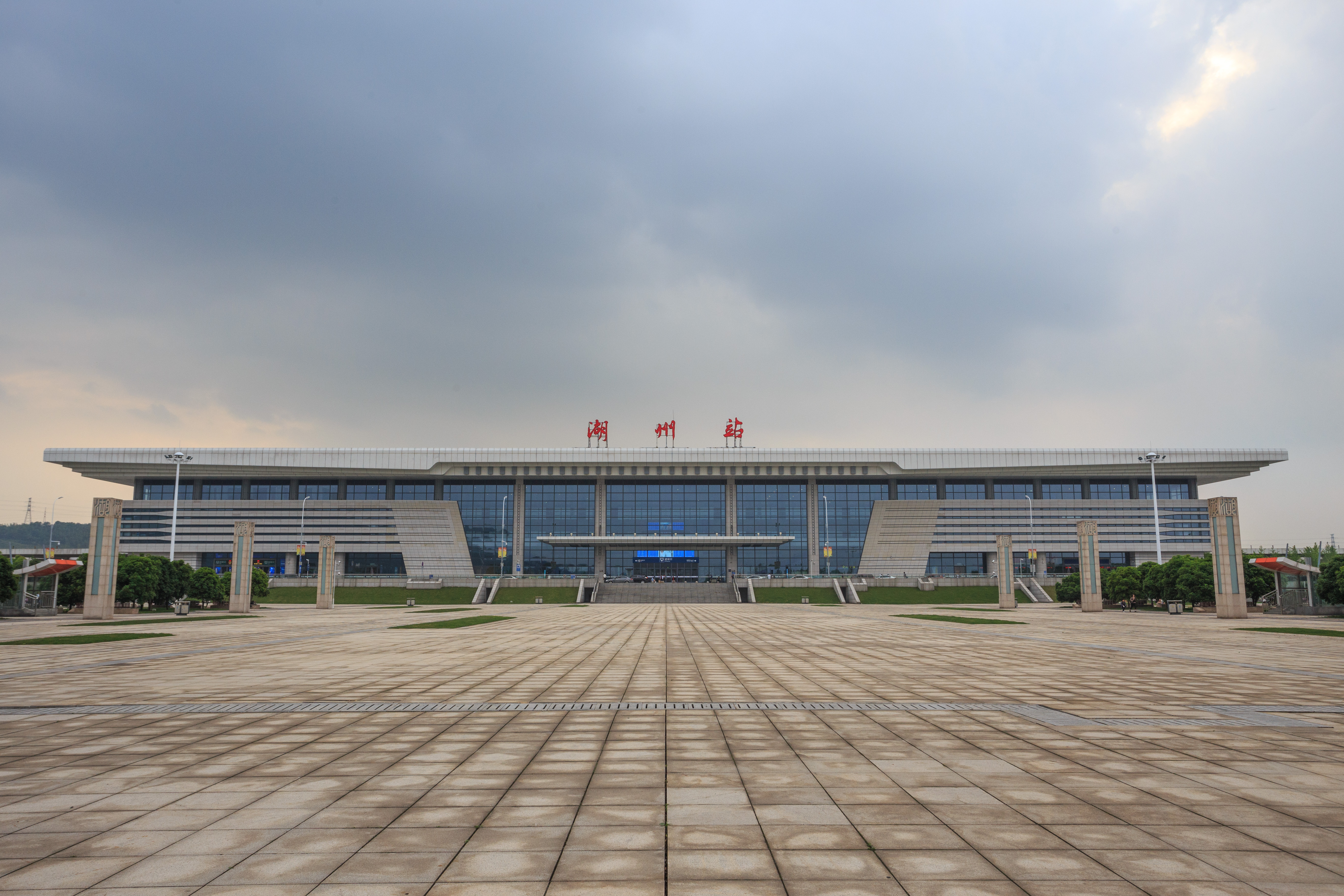

General information
- Location: Wuxing District, Huzhou, Zhejiang; China
- Coordinates: 30.86°N 120.02°E
- Lines: Xuancheng–Hangzhou railway Nanjing–Hangzhou high-speed railway Shangqiu–Hefei–Hangzhou high-speed railway Shanghai–Suzhou–Huzhou high-speed railway
- Platforms: 8 (3 island platforms and 2 side platforms)
- Tracks: 14
Location

Huzhou railway station (Chinese: 湖州站) is a railway station in Wuxing District, Huzhou, Zhejiang, China. It offers both conventional and high-speed service.

== History ==
On 28 June 2020, the Shangqiu–Hefei–Hangzhou high-speed railway opened, offering direct connections to Wuhu and Hefei.

On 26 December 2024, the Shanghai–Suzhou–Huzhou high-speed railway opened.

Preceding station	China Railway	Following station
Changxing South towards Xuancheng	Xuancheng–Hangzhou railway	Deqing West towards Hangzhou
Preceding station	China Railway High-speed	Following station
Changxing towards Nanjing South	Nanjing–Hangzhou high-speed railway	Deqing towards Hangzhou East
Anji towards Shangqiu	Shangqiu–Hangzhou high-speed railway	Deqing towards Tonglu
Huzhou East towards Shanghai Hongqiao	Shanghai–Suzhou–Huzhou high-speed railway	Terminus
