= Changxing South railway station =

Railway station in Changxing, Huzhou, Zhejiang

Changxing South 长兴南
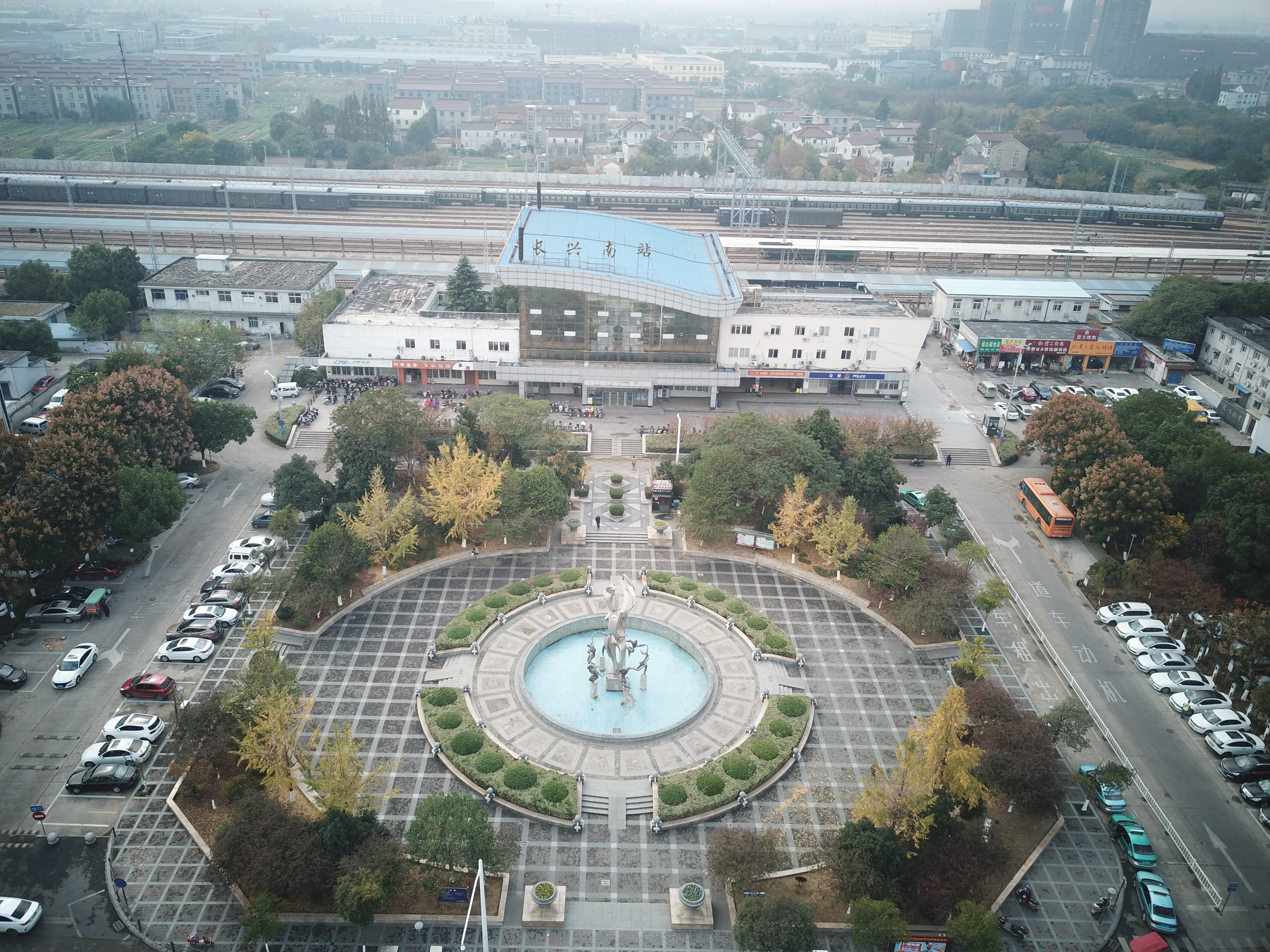

General information
- Location: Changxing County, Huzhou, Zhejiang; China
- Coordinates: 30°59′31″N 119°54′02″E
- Lines: Xuancheng–Hangzhou railway; Xinyi–Changxing railway
Location

Changxing South railway station (Chinese: 长兴南站) is a railway station in Changxing County, Huzhou, Zhejiang, China. It is an intermediate stop on the Xuancheng–Hangzhou railway and is also the southern terminus of the Xinyi–Changxing railway.

== History ==
The station building was rebuilt in 2005. On 20 June 2012, the name of the station was changed from Changxing to Changxing South, in preparation for the opening of the new Changxing railway station.

Preceding station	China Railway	Following station
Guangde towards Xuancheng	Xuancheng–Hangzhou railway	Huzhou towards Hangzhou
