= Xinyi, Jiangsu =

Xinyi 新沂市
- County-level city
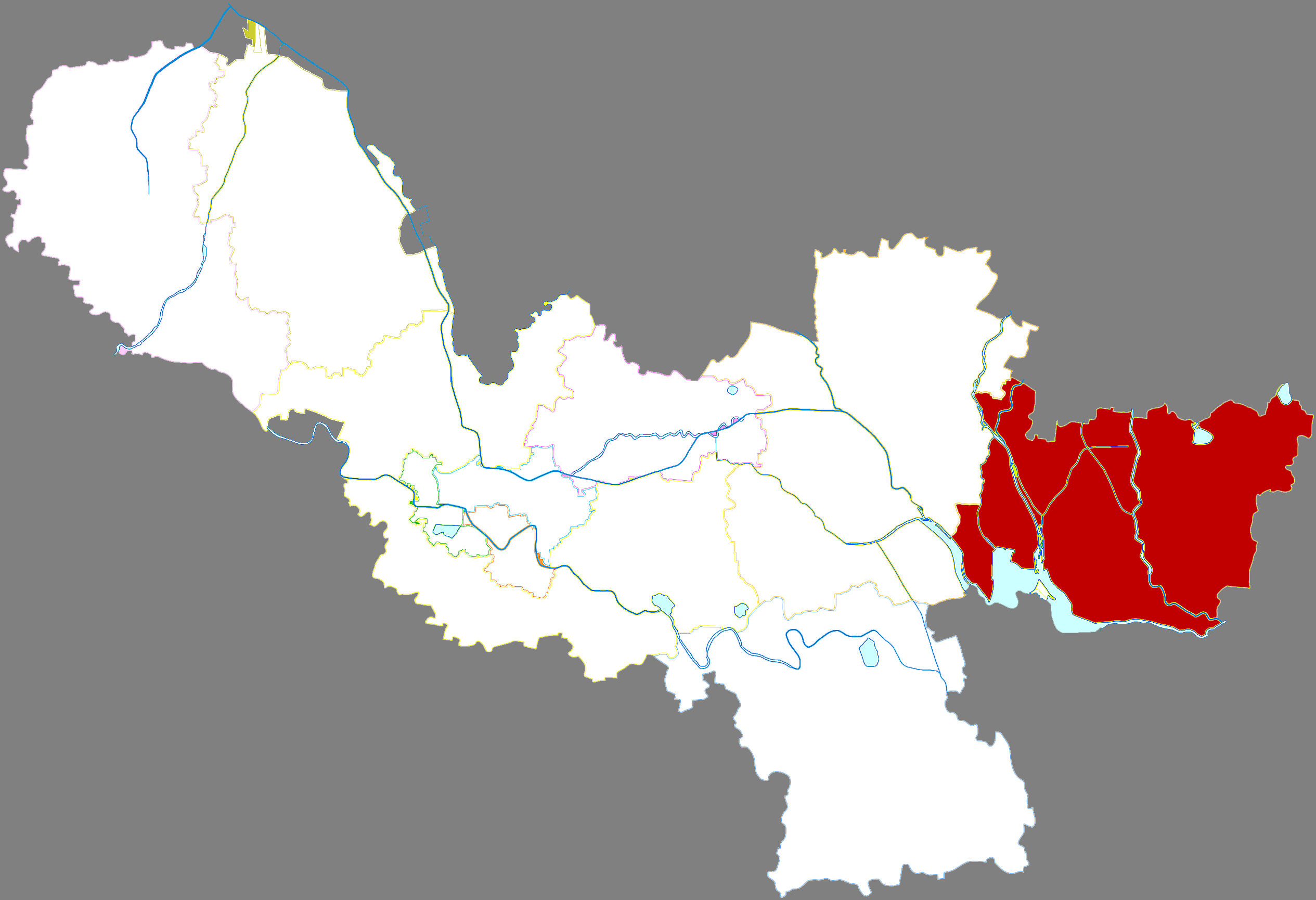
- Location in Xuzhou

- Location in Jiangsu
- Coordinates: 34°17′10″N 118°21′18″E
- Country: People's Republic of China
- Province: Jiangsu
- Prefecture-level city: Xuzhou

Area
  - Total: 1,616 km^{2} (624 sq mi)

Population (2020 census)
  - Total: 969,922
  - Density: 600.2/km^{2} (1,555/sq mi)
- Time zone: UTC+8 (China Standard)
- Postal Code: 221400
- Website: www.xy.gov.cn/xy/

Xinyi (Chinese: 新沂; pinyin: Xīnyí; Wade–Giles: Hsin-i; lit. 'New Yi [River]') is a county-level city under the administration of Xuzhou, Jiangsu province, China. It borders the prefecture-level cities of Linyi (Shandong) to the north, Lianyungang to the northeast, and Suqian to the east and south.

== History ==
The archaeological site of Huating, located in the southwestern part, was inhabited as long as 5,000 years ago. During the Zhou dynasty, its southern territory was dominated by a minor state: Zhongwu, which was variously annexed to Wu, Yue and Chu. Two counties designated Siwu and Jianlin were established in its southern part and northern part in the West Han, both counties were dissolved during the Southern and Northern dynasties, and the major region was administrated by Suqian. The borders among then Suqian, Shuyang, Donghai along with Pizhou were merged and became a separated county in 1949. It named after the seat, Xin'an (新安) town, but was renamed Xinyi, a river flowing through its area, in 1952, because of its namesake in Henan. The county was converted to a county-level city in 1990.

== Administrative divisions ==
At present, Xinyi City has 16 towns.

16 towns

- Xin'an (新安镇)
- Wayao (瓦窑镇)
- Gangtou (港头镇)
- Tangdian (唐店镇)
- Hegou (合沟镇)
- Caoqiao (草桥镇)
- Yaowan (窑湾镇)
- Qipan (棋盘镇)
- Xindian (新店镇)
- Shaodian (邵店镇)
- Beigou (北沟镇)
- Shiji (时集镇)
- Gaoliu (高流镇)
- Ahu (阿湖镇)
- Shuangtang (双塘镇)
- Malingshan (马陵山镇)

== Climate ==
Climate data for Xinyi, elevation 29 m (95 ft), (1991–2020 normals, extremes 1981–2026)
Month	Jan	Feb	Mar	Apr	May	Jun	Jul	Aug	Sep	Oct	Nov	Dec	Year
Record high °C (°F)	18.4 (65.1)	25.1 (77.2)	28.5 (83.3)	31.7 (89.1)	36.0 (96.8)	38.0 (100.4)	38.9 (102.0)	37.2 (99.0)	35.4 (95.7)	33.2 (91.8)	27.3 (81.1)	20.5 (68.9)	38.9 (102.0)
Mean daily maximum °C (°F)	5.5 (41.9)	8.6 (47.5)	14.2 (57.6)	20.7 (69.3)	26.0 (78.8)	29.9 (85.8)	31.3 (88.3)	30.6 (87.1)	27.0 (80.6)	21.9 (71.4)	14.4 (57.9)	7.7 (45.9)	19.8 (67.7)
Daily mean °C (°F)	0.6 (33.1)	3.4 (38.1)	8.5 (47.3)	14.9 (58.8)	20.4 (68.7)	24.6 (76.3)	27.1 (80.8)	26.4 (79.5)	22.1 (71.8)	16.2 (61.2)	9.1 (48.4)	2.7 (36.9)	14.7 (58.4)
Mean daily minimum °C (°F)	−3.0 (26.6)	−0.6 (30.9)	3.8 (38.8)	9.7 (49.5)	15.4 (59.7)	20.1 (68.2)	23.8 (74.8)	23.3 (73.9)	18.3 (64.9)	11.8 (53.2)	4.9 (40.8)	−1.1 (30.0)	10.5 (50.9)
Record low °C (°F)	−14.2 (6.4)	−15.4 (4.3)	−8.6 (16.5)	−1.0 (30.2)	4.5 (40.1)	11.7 (53.1)	16.6 (61.9)	13.5 (56.3)	7.3 (45.1)	−1.8 (28.8)	−7.4 (18.7)	−13.6 (7.5)	−15.4 (4.3)
Average precipitation mm (inches)	18.8 (0.74)	24.6 (0.97)	33.6 (1.32)	45.2 (1.78)	74.9 (2.95)	112.6 (4.43)	203.3 (8.00)	183.8 (7.24)	78.7 (3.10)	38.0 (1.50)	33.7 (1.33)	18.8 (0.74)	866 (34.1)
Average precipitation days (≥ 0.1 mm)	4.6	5.5	6.2	7.1	7.6	8.2	13.4	12.1	8.1	5.8	6.1	4.4	89.1
Average snowy days	3.0	2.6	1.2	0.1	0	0	0	0	0	0	0.6	1.7	9.2
Average relative humidity (%)	67	66	63	64	68	71	82	83	78	72	71	68	71
Mean monthly sunshine hours	164.9	161.7	200.7	223.5	235.5	203.4	194.2	196.5	188.9	190.1	167.0	167.9	2,294.3
Percentage possible sunshine	52	52	54	57	54	47	44	48	51	55	54	55	52
Source: China Meteorological Administration all-time January high

== Transport ==
Xinyi is a railway junction on the Longhai Railway. It is the southern terminus of the Jiaozhou–Xinyi railway and the northern terminus of the Xinyi-Changxing Railway.

== Sister Cities ==
- (United States) Trumbull, Connecticut since 1996
