= Liyang =

City in China

Liyang 溧阳市
- County-level city
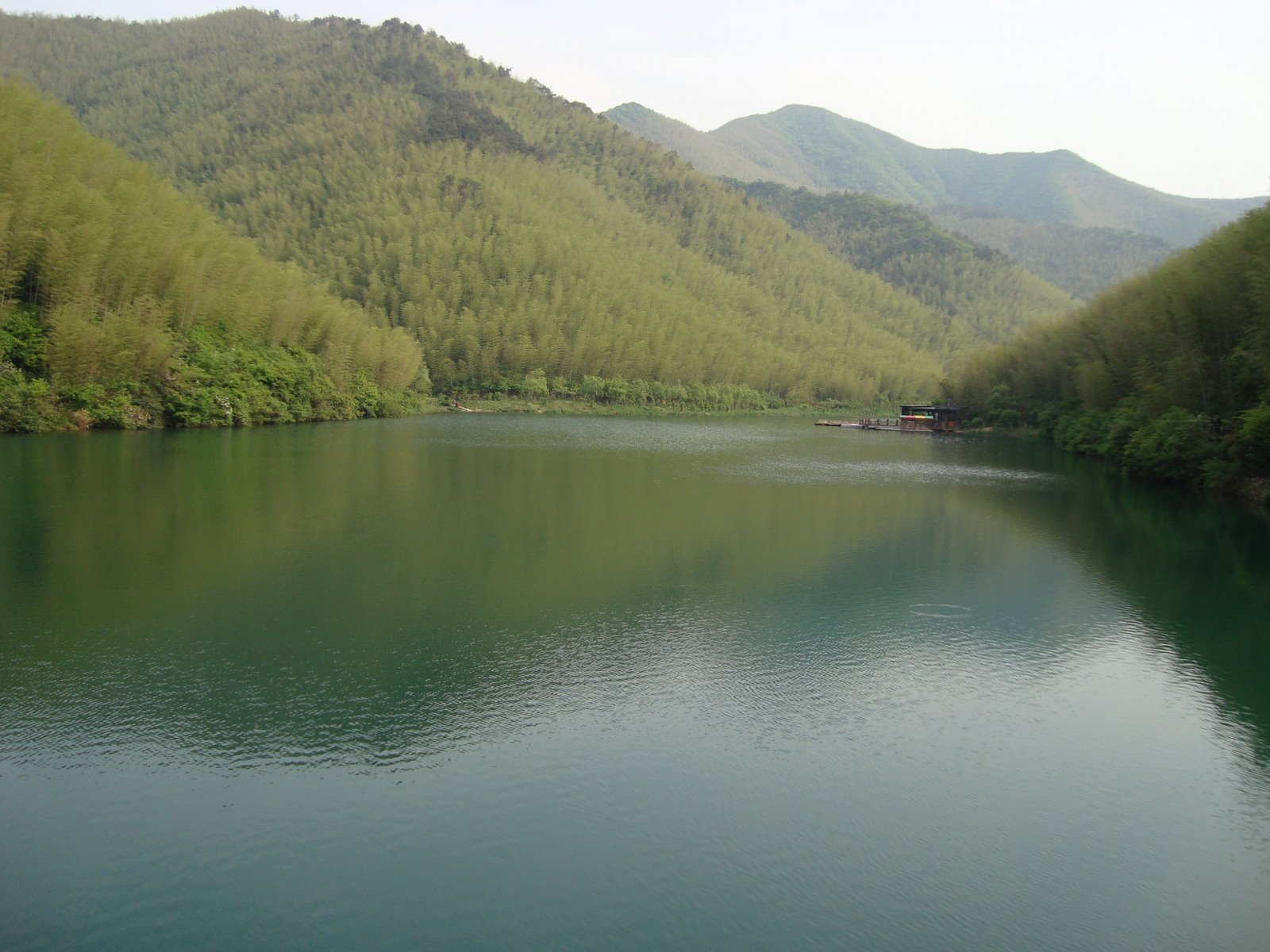
- Nanshan bamboo forest

- Location in Jiangsu
- Coordinates: 31°25′50″N 119°28′44″E
- Country: People's Republic of China
- Province: Jiangsu
- Prefecture-level city: Changzhou

Area (2018)
  - County-level city: 1,535.87 km^{2} (593.00 sq mi)
  - Urban: 80 km^{2} (31 sq mi)

Population (2024)
  - County-level city: 806,900
  - Density: 525.4/km^{2} (1,361/sq mi)
  - Urban: 537,200
- Time zone: UTC+8 (China Standard)
- Postal Code: 213300

Liyang (simplified Chinese: 溧阳; traditional Chinese: 溧陽; pinyin: Lìyáng) is a county-level city under the administration of Changzhou in the Jiangsu province of the People's Republic of China. In 2024, it had a population of 806,900. It borders the prefecture-level divisions of Wuxi to the east, Xuancheng (Anhui) to the south, and Nanjing to the west.

== Administration ==
In August 1990, the PRC State Council approved the upgrade of Liyang from a county to a county-level city under the administration of the prefecture-level city of Changzhou.

At present, Liyang City has 3 subdistricts and 9 towns.

3 subdistricts

- Kunlun (昆仑街道)
- Licheng (溧城街道)
- Guxian (古县街道)

9 towns

- Daitou (埭头镇)
- Shanghuang (上黄镇)
- Daibu (戴埠镇)
- Tianmuhu (天目湖镇)
- Bieqiao (别桥镇)
- Shangxing (上兴镇)
- Zhuze (竹箦镇)
- Nandu (南渡镇)
- Shezhu (社渚镇)

== Geography ==
Liyang has a total area of 1,535.87 square kilometres (593.00 sq mi). Liyang resides at the boundary of Jiangsu and Anhui provinces and is part of the Yangtze River Delta.

== Climate ==
Liyang has a humid subtropical climate (Köppen Cfa), with an average annual temperature of 16.6 °C (61.9 °F), It's higher than 16.4 °C (61.5 °F) in Nanjing and lower than 17.1 °C (62.8 °F) in Suzhou. The average annual precipitation is 1198.8 mm (47.18 in). The monthly percent possible sunshine ranging from 33% in June to 47% in August, the city receives 1,824.9 hours of bright sunshine annually. In recent years, Liyang has warmed up faster, take 2025 as an example, the average temperature of Liyang was 18.6 °C (65.5 °F) which was 2.0 °C higher than the average from 1991 to 2020.

Climate data for Liyang, elevation 6 m (20 ft), (1991–2020 normals, extremes 1981–present)
Month	Jan	Feb	Mar	Apr	May	Jun	Jul	Aug	Sep	Oct	Nov	Dec	Year
Record high °C (°F)	21.5 (70.7)	28.4 (83.1)	34.7 (94.5)	35.7 (96.3)	38.4 (101.1)	37.5 (99.5)	40.8 (105.4)	41.5 (106.7)	38.3 (100.9)	38.7 (101.7)	31.6 (88.9)	25.4 (77.7)	41.5 (106.7)
Mean daily maximum °C (°F)	7.5 (45.5)	10.1 (50.2)	14.9 (58.8)	21.2 (70.2)	26.5 (79.7)	29.1 (84.4)	32.9 (91.2)	32.3 (90.1)	28.0 (82.4)	22.8 (73.0)	16.8 (62.2)	10.2 (50.4)	22.9 (73.2)
Daily mean °C (°F)	3.6 (38.5)	5.8 (42.4)	10.1 (50.2)	16.1 (61.0)	21.5 (70.7)	25.0 (77.0)	28.8 (83.8)	28.2 (82.8)	23.8 (74.8)	18.1 (64.6)	12.0 (53.6)	5.8 (42.4)	16.6 (61.8)
Mean daily minimum °C (°F)	0.6 (33.1)	2.4 (36.3)	6.4 (43.5)	11.8 (53.2)	17.3 (63.1)	21.6 (70.9)	25.4 (77.7)	25.1 (77.2)	20.6 (69.1)	14.4 (57.9)	8.3 (46.9)	2.4 (36.3)	13.0 (55.4)
Record low °C (°F)	−13.7 (7.3)	−8.8 (16.2)	−4.0 (24.8)	0.6 (33.1)	7.7 (45.9)	12.5 (54.5)	18.6 (65.5)	17.2 (63.0)	10.8 (51.4)	1.9 (35.4)	−3.8 (25.2)	−10.7 (12.7)	−13.7 (7.3)
Average precipitation mm (inches)	70.0 (2.76)	66.8 (2.63)	93.5 (3.68)	91.5 (3.60)	105.5 (4.15)	193.6 (7.62)	192.4 (7.57)	134.3 (5.29)	91.5 (3.60)	58.2 (2.29)	57.5 (2.26)	44.0 (1.73)	1,198.8 (47.18)
Average precipitation days (≥ 0.1 mm)	11.0	10.6	11.9	11.4	11.7	13.0	12.4	12.5	9.1	8.3	9.5	8.1	129.5
Average snowy days	3.2	2.1	0.7	0	0	0	0	0	0	0	0.3	0.9	7.2
Average relative humidity (%)	77	76	74	72	72	78	78	80	80	77	77	75	76
Mean monthly sunshine hours	115.2	114.5	139.0	164.7	177.9	140.4	194.9	191.1	159.7	161.8	135.8	129.9	1,824.9
Percentage possible sunshine	36	36	37	42	42	33	45	47	44	46	43	42	41
Source: China Meteorological Administration

Climate data for Liyang, elevation 5 m (16 ft), (August 2025 ~ July 2026)
Month	Jan	Feb	Mar	Apr	May	Jun	Jul	Aug	Sep	Oct	Nov	Dec	Year
Mean daily maximum °C (°F)	10.0 (50.0)	13.1 (55.6)	15.3 (59.5)	21.4 (70.5)	27.9 (82.2)	29.3 (84.7)	33.7 (92.7)	35.1 (95.2)	31.0 (87.8)	24.7 (76.5)	18.2 (64.8)	13.2 (55.8)	22.80 (73.04)
Daily mean °C (°F)	4.7 (40.5)	7.8 (46.0)	11.5 (52.7)	17.0 (62.6)	23.2 (73.8)	25.3 (77.5)	29.9 (85.8)	30.9 (87.6)	27.1 (80.8)	21.0 (69.8)	12.6 (54.7)	8.0 (46.4)	18.31 (64.96)
Mean daily minimum °C (°F)	0.8 (33.4)	4.0 (39.2)	8.4 (47.1)	13.5 (56.3)	19.2 (66.6)	22.1 (71.8)	26.8 (80.2)	27.2 (81.0)	24.3 (75.7)	18.2 (64.8)	8.3 (46.9)	4.2 (39.6)	14.81 (58.66)
Average precipitation mm (inches)	36.8 (1.45)	40.0 (1.57)	91.7 (3.61)	72.6 (2.86)	117.1 (4.61)	165.3 (6.51)	56.9 (2.24)	91.0 (3.58)	178.2 (7.02)	44.5 (1.75)	33.2 (1.31)	12.9 (0.51)	940.2 (37.02)
Average relative humidity (%)	68	72	76	77	70	76	77	73	82	80	69	68	74
Source: China Meteorological Administration

== Transportation ==
The Nanjing–Hangzhou Passenger Railway crosses Liyang. As of 2020, over 80 passenger trains make daily stops at Liyang Railway Station, which is located 5 kilometres south of downtown Liyang. The shortest commute time to major cities nearby by train is 26 minutes for Nanjing and 53 minutes for Hangzhou. There are also direct connections to other major Chinese cities such as Beijing, Shanghai, Xiamen, Tianjin, Qingdao, Wuhan, Changsha, and Kunming.

National highways G25 and G4011 cross Liyang.

The nearest major airport is Nanjing Lukou International Airport, roughly one hour by car away.

== Language ==
The dialect spoken by most people in Liyang is a Northern Wu dialect closely related to that of Changzhou, while others speak Standard Mandarin or Jianghuai Mandarin.

== Sights ==
Tian Mu Lake inside Liyang, is a popular tourist area featuring the lake, resorts, and famous fish head soup. Nanshan Zhuhai is another tourist site with great views of bamboo trees all over the hills. It is also an artificial lake.

== Education ==
Nanjing University of Aeronautics and Astronautics has a campus in Liyang for its School of Civil Aviation and School of General Aviation.

- Liyang Guanghua Senior School

== Notable people ==
- Wu Yun Dong, theoretical organic chemist

== Sister cities ==
- Hakusan, Ishikawa (once Mattō, Ishikawa), Japan (since 1996)
- Union City, California, United States (since 2010)
- Leeuwarden, Netherlands (since 2011)
- Fauquier County, Virginia, United States (since 2013)
- Chatham-Kent, Canada (since 2014)
- Fulda (district), Germany (since 2016)
- Paphos, Cyprus (since 2018)
- Columbia, Maryland, United States (since 2018)
- Truskavets, Ukraine (since 2020)
- Galway, Ireland (since 2023)
