= Jiaozhou–Xinyi railway =

Railway line in China

Overview
- Status: Operational
- Termini: Jiaozhou; Xinyi

Service
- Type: Heavy rail

Technical
- Track gauge: 1,435 mm (4 ft 8 1/2 in) standard gauge
- Electrification: 50 Hz 25,000 V

The Jiaozhou−Xinyi railway (simplified Chinese: 胶新铁路; traditional Chinese: 膠新鐵路; pinyin: Jiāoxīn Tiělù) is a north–south railway that connects the cities of Jiaozhou in Shandong Province and Xinyi in Jiangsu Province, China. The line is 306.6 kilometres (190.5 mi) long and was built from 2001 to 2003. Major towns and cities along route include Jiaozhou, Gaomi, Zhucheng, Wulian, Ju County, Tancheng and Linyi in Shandong and Xinyi in Jiangsu.

In May 2013, construction on a 20.3-kilometre (12.6 mi) long branch from Meijiabu station (south of Linyi) to Linshu started. Operation began on 16 December 2015. The branch has a line speed of 120 kilometres per hour (75 mph).

== See also ==
- List of railways in China
- Rail transport in the People's Republic of China
