= Yancheng–Yixing intercity railway =

Railway line in China

Overview
- Native name: 盐泰锡常宜城际铁路
- Status: Planned
- Termini: Yancheng; Yixing

Service
- Type: Heavy rail

Technical
- Line length: 311 km (193 mi)
- Track gauge: 1,435 mm (4 ft 8 1/2 in) standard gauge
- Electrification: 25 kV 50 Hz AC (overhead line)
- Operating speed: 350 km/h (220 mph) (Yancheng–Jingjiang and Taihu West–Yixing); 250 km/h (160 mph) (Jingjiang–Taihu West)

The Yancheng–Yixing intercity railway (Chinese: 盐泰锡常宜城际铁路) is a planned high-speed railway in Jiangsu, China. It is expected to have the following stations: Yancheng, Anfeng West (reserved), Xinghua East, Taizhou South, Taixing East, Jingjiang East, Jiangyin, Huishan, Taihu West, Yixing West (reserved) and Yixing. The line is expected to be around 310 kilometres (190 mi) long and have a maximum speed of 250 kilometres per hour (160 mph).
