= Changxing County =

Changxing 长兴县 Changhing
- County
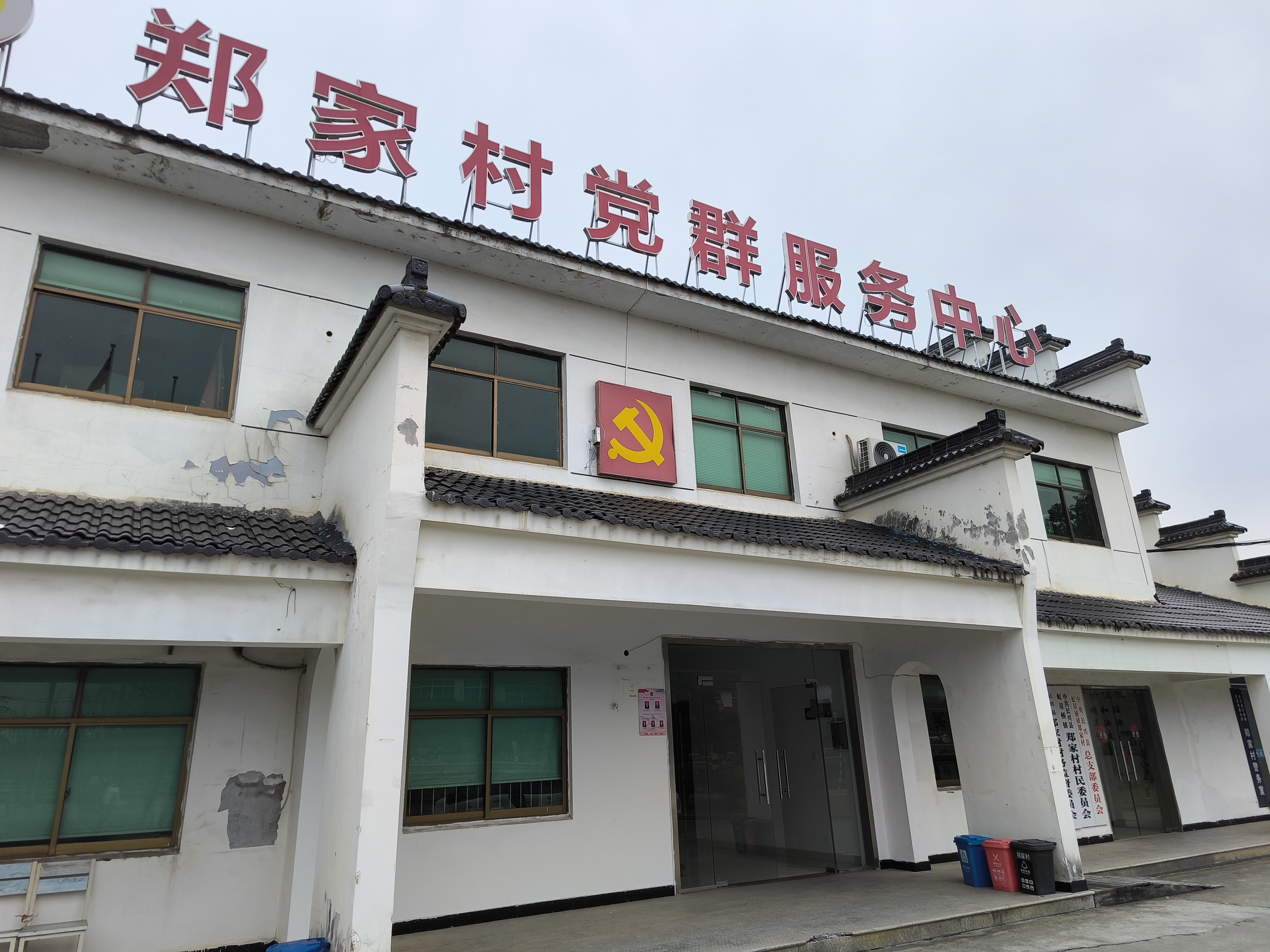
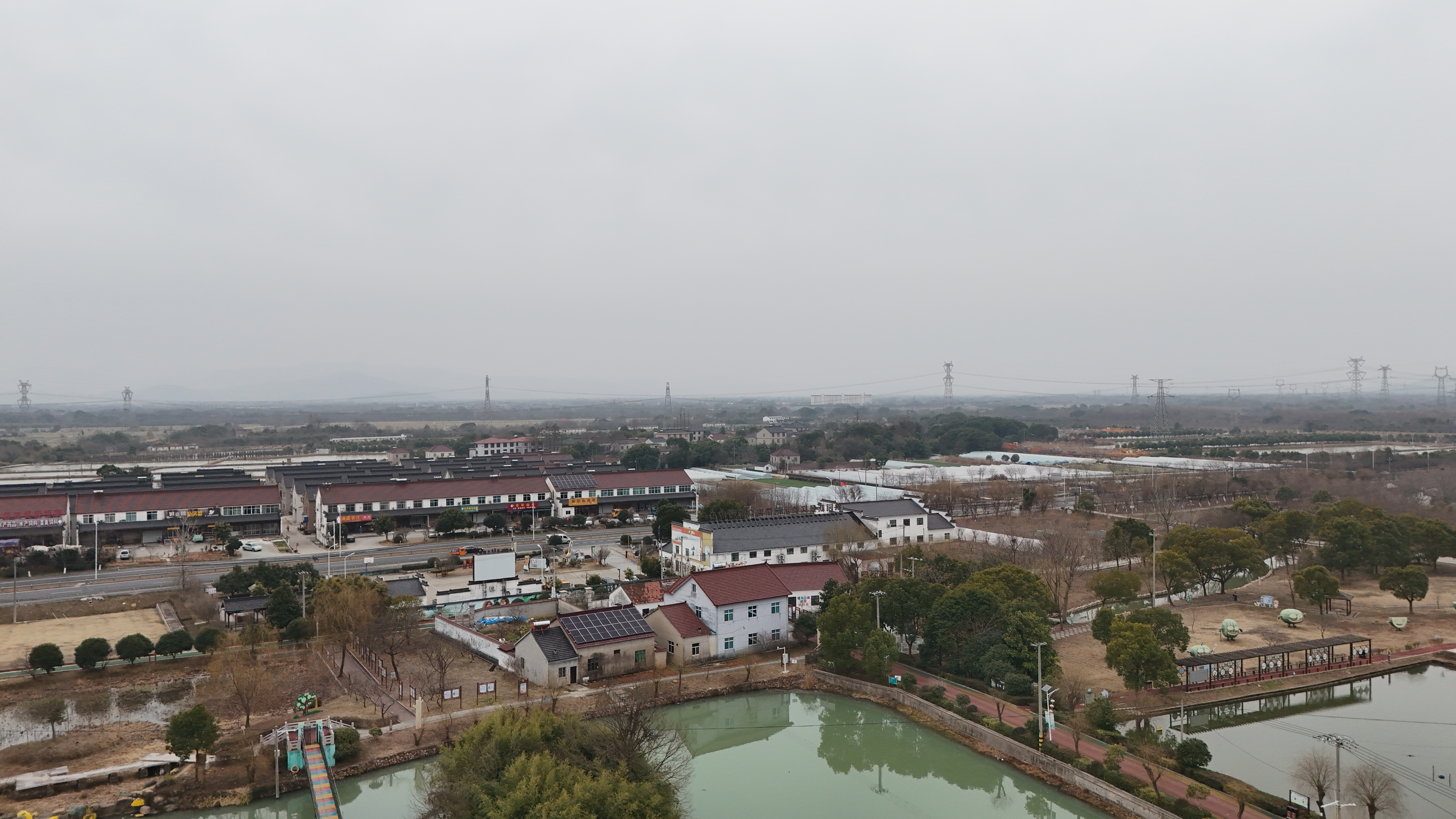
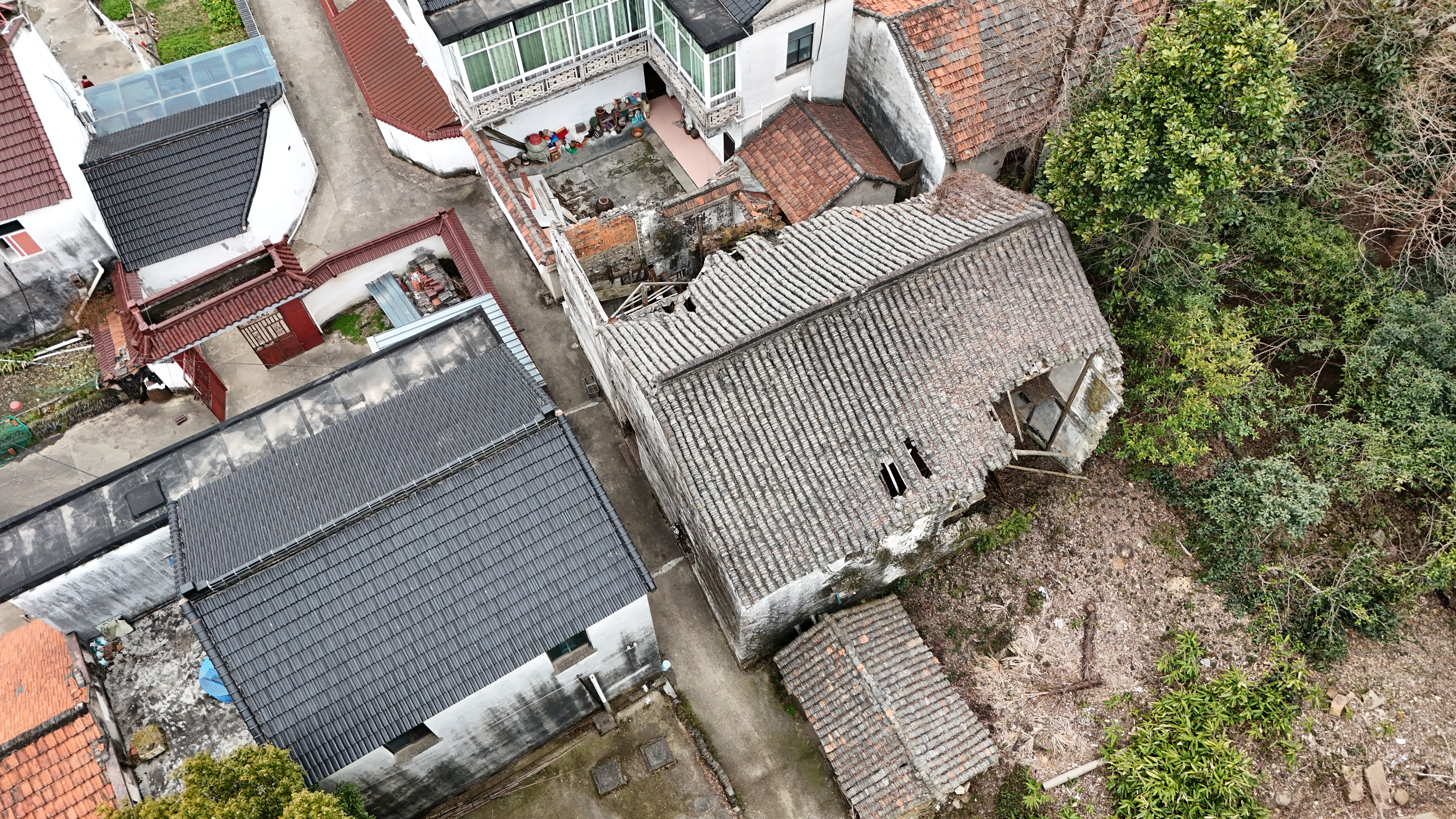
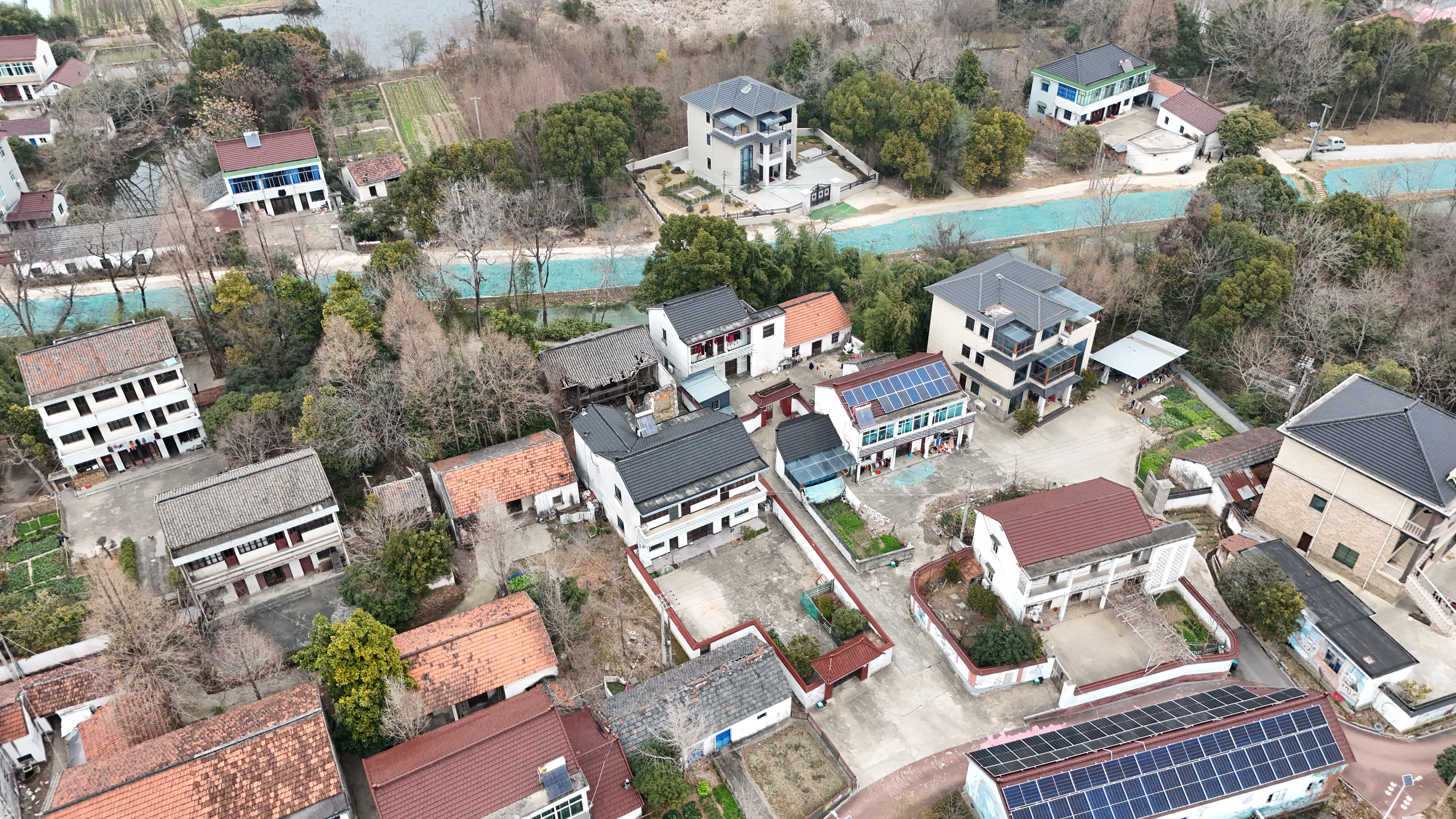
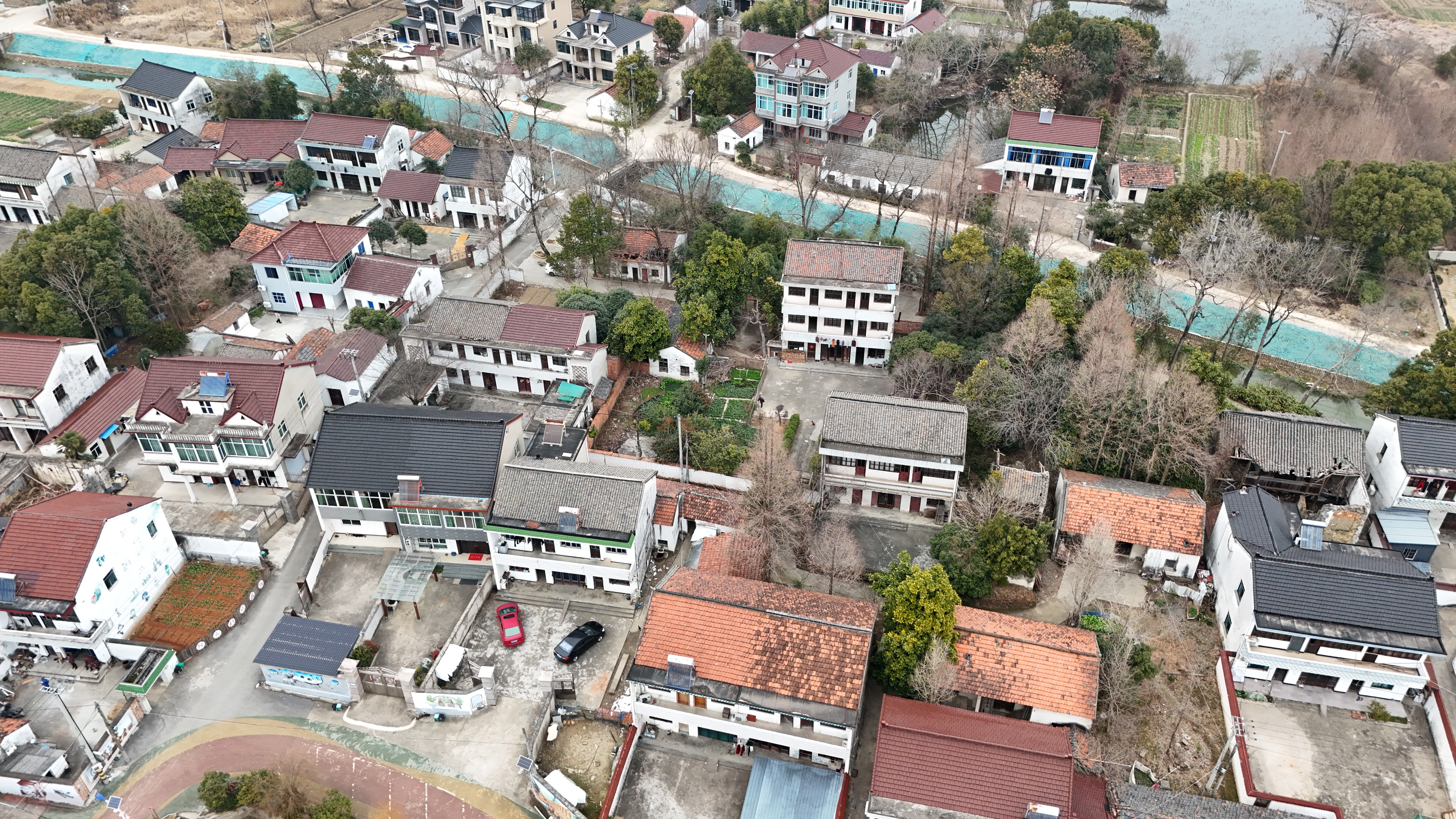

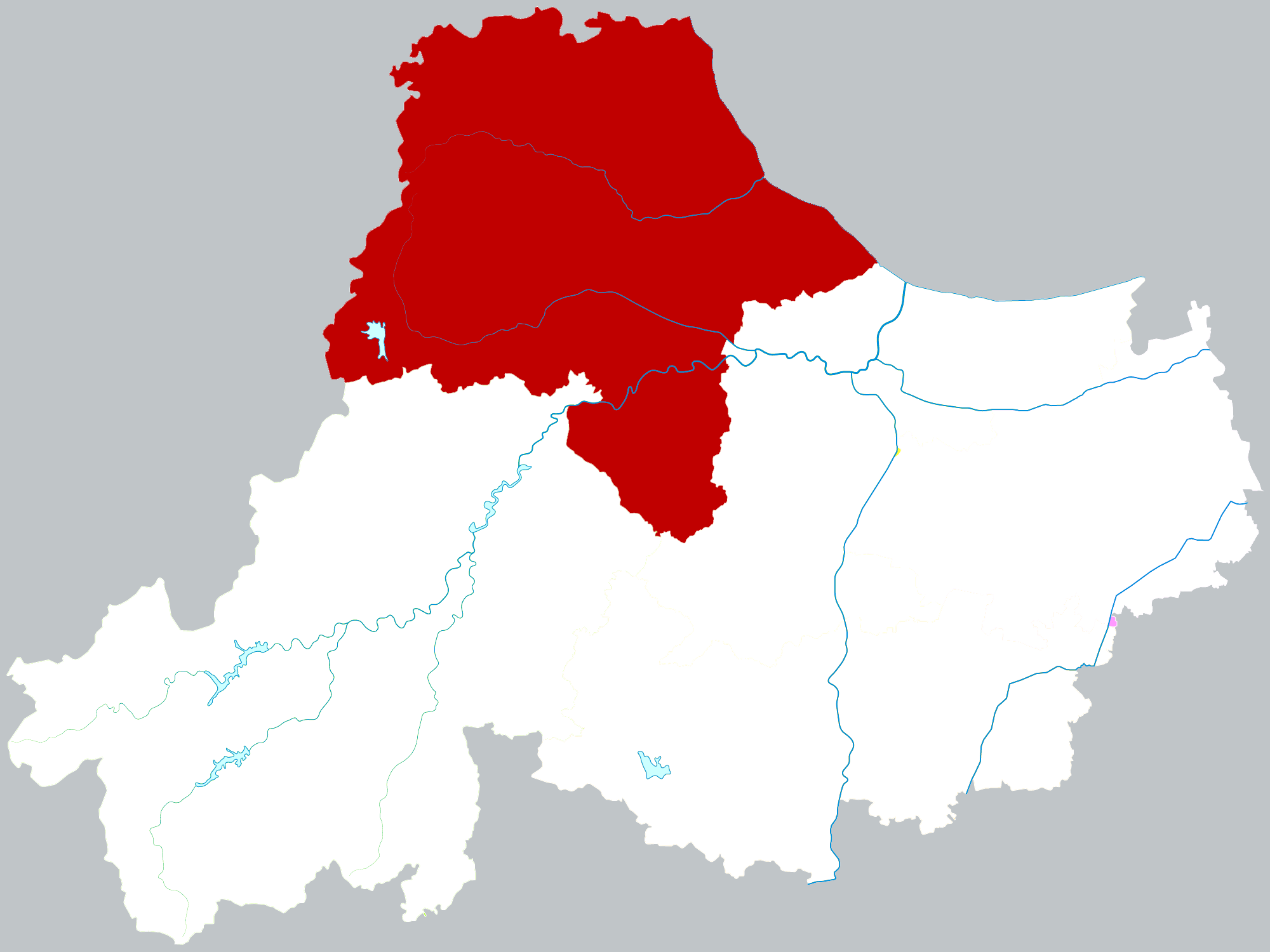
- Location of Changxing County within Huzhou

- Location of the seat in Zhejiang
- Coordinates: 31°01′37″N 119°54′40″E
- Country: People's Republic of China
- Province: Zhejiang
- Prefecture-level city: Huzhou

Area
  - Total: 1,431.34 km^{2} (552.64 sq mi)

Population (2020)
  - Total: 673,776
  - Density: 470.731/km^{2} (1,219.19/sq mi)
- Time zone: UTC+8 (China Standard)

Changxing (simplified Chinese: 长兴县; traditional Chinese: 長興縣; pinyin: Chángxīng Xiàn) is a county of the prefecture-level city of Huzhou, in the northwest of Zhejiang province, China. Situated on the southwest shore of Lake Tai, it borders the provinces of Jiangsu to the north and Anhui to the west. It has a total area of 1,430 km^{2} (550 sq mi) and a population of 620,000 inhabitants.

Changxing, established in 282 AD (the third year of the Taikang era under Emperor Wu of the Jin dynasty), has a history of more than 1,700 years. It has abundant natural resources and a long cultural heritage, and is known as the "realm of fish and rice", the "home of silk", the "land of culture", and a "distinguished county in southeastern China".

The Changhsingian Age of the Permian Period of geological time is named after Changxing. The stage was named for the Changhsingian Limestone.

Since 2004, Changxing has had a Twin City (County) relationship with Kalmar County in Sweden.

== Administrative divisions ==
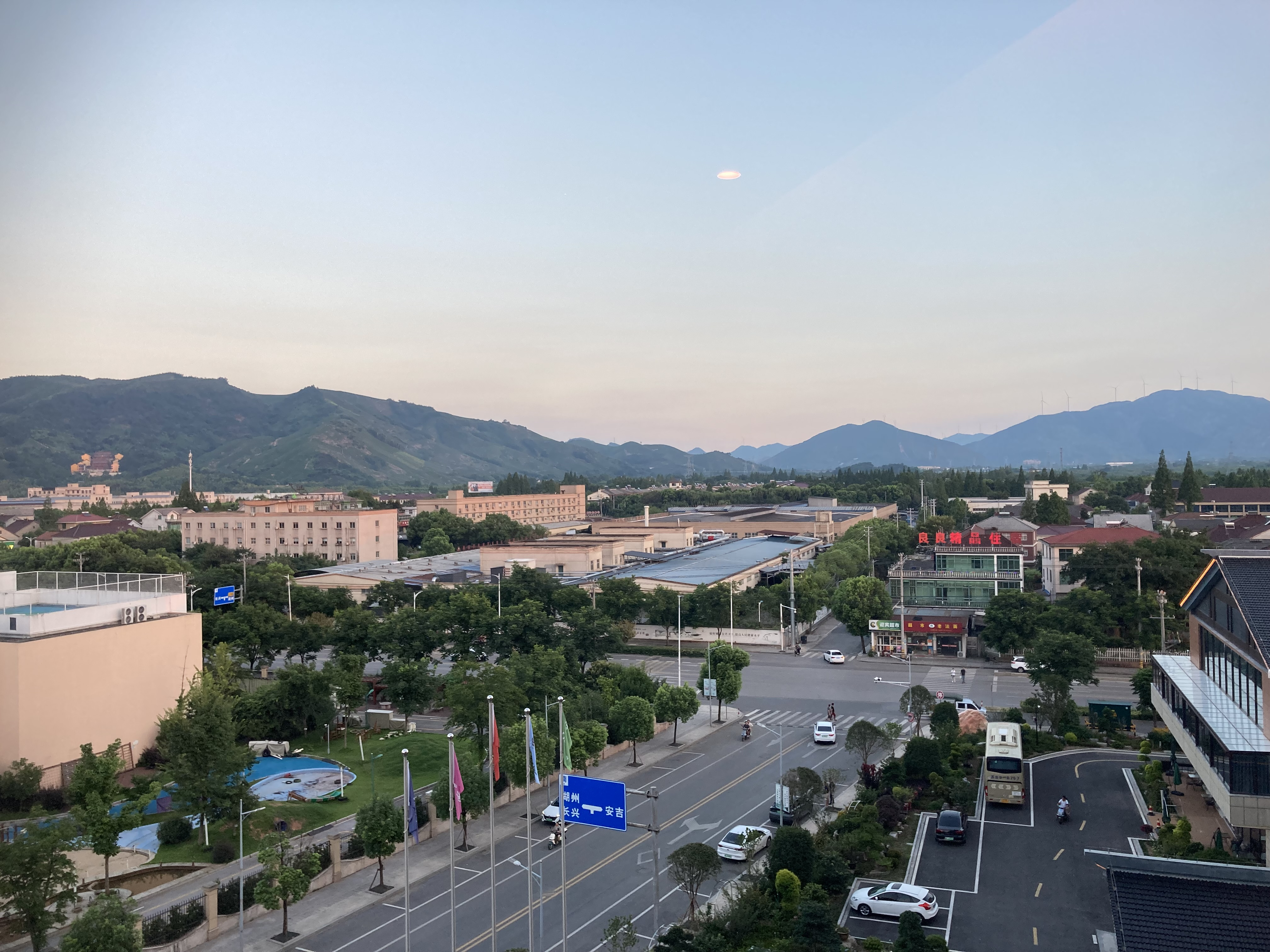
Heping, Changxing

Towns:

- Zhicheng, Changxing (雉城镇), Hongqiao, Changxing (洪桥镇), Lincheng, Changxing (林城镇), Si'an (泗安镇), Xiaopu, Changxing (小浦镇), Heping, Changxing (和平镇), Meishan, Changxing (煤山镇), Jiapu (夹浦镇), Hongxingqiao (虹星桥镇), Lijiaxiang (李家巷镇)

Townships:

- Shuikou Township (水口乡), Lüshan Township (吕山乡), Wushan Township (吴山乡), Baixian Township (白岘乡), Huaikan Township (槐坎乡), Erjieling Township (二界岭乡)

== Climate ==
Climate data for Changxing, elevation 25 m (82 ft), (1991–2020 normals, extremes 1981–present)
| Month | Jan | Feb | Mar | Apr | May | Jun | Jul | Aug | Sep | Oct | Nov | Dec | Year |
|---|---|---|---|---|---|---|---|---|---|---|---|---|---|
| Record high °C (°F) | 23.9 (75.0) | 28.6 (83.5) | 34.6 (94.3) | 35.1 (95.2) | 36.8 (98.2) | 38.1 (100.6) | 40.9 (105.6) | 39.4 (102.9) | 39.0 (102.2) | 34.4 (93.9) | 29.0 (84.2) | 24.1 (75.4) | 40.9 (105.6) |
| Mean daily maximum °C (°F) | 7.9 (46.2) | 10.4 (50.7) | 15.2 (59.4) | 21.4 (70.5) | 26.3 (79.3) | 28.9 (84.0) | 33.1 (91.6) | 32.5 (90.5) | 28.0 (82.4) | 23.0 (73.4) | 17.1 (62.8) | 10.7 (51.3) | 21.2 (70.2) |
| Daily mean °C (°F) | 3.8 (38.8) | 6.0 (42.8) | 10.3 (50.5) | 16.2 (61.2) | 21.4 (70.5) | 24.8 (76.6) | 28.7 (83.7) | 28.3 (82.9) | 24.0 (75.2) | 18.2 (64.8) | 12.1 (53.8) | 6.0 (42.8) | 16.7 (62.0) |
| Mean daily minimum °C (°F) | 0.8 (33.4) | 2.6 (36.7) | 6.5 (43.7) | 11.8 (53.2) | 17.1 (62.8) | 21.4 (70.5) | 25.2 (77.4) | 25.0 (77.0) | 20.6 (69.1) | 14.5 (58.1) | 8.3 (46.9) | 2.6 (36.7) | 13.0 (55.5) |
| Record low °C (°F) | −9.1 (15.6) | −7.7 (18.1) | −3.9 (25.0) | 0.7 (33.3) | 8.1 (46.6) | 13.2 (55.8) | 17.8 (64.0) | 18.6 (65.5) | 10.3 (50.5) | 2.6 (36.7) | −4.2 (24.4) | −8.9 (16.0) | −9.1 (15.6) |
| Average precipitation mm (inches) | 83.2 (3.28) | 75.2 (2.96) | 112.9 (4.44) | 97.2 (3.83) | 117.0 (4.61) | 222.5 (8.76) | 177.4 (6.98) | 166.0 (6.54) | 110.2 (4.34) | 73.8 (2.91) | 62.7 (2.47) | 51.5 (2.03) | 1,349.6 (53.15) |
| Average precipitation days (≥ 0.1 mm) | 11.7 | 11.0 | 13.6 | 12.5 | 12.7 | 15.1 | 14.1 | 14.1 | 10.6 | 8.2 | 10.1 | 8.6 | 142.3 |
| Average snowy days | 3.6 | 2.6 | 0.9 | 0.1 | 0 | 0 | 0 | 0 | 0 | 0 | 0.3 | 1.3 | 8.8 |
| Average relative humidity (%) | 77 | 75 | 73 | 71 | 72 | 79 | 78 | 79 | 79 | 77 | 77 | 74 | 76 |
| Mean monthly sunshine hours | 98.2 | 100.6 | 124.6 | 149.4 | 156.9 | 114.0 | 184.2 | 176.5 | 145.8 | 146.1 | 122.0 | 113.1 | 1,631.4 |
| Percentage possible sunshine | 31 | 32 | 33 | 38 | 37 | 27 | 43 | 43 | 40 | 42 | 39 | 36 | 37 |
Source: China Meteorological Administrationall-time extreme temperature

== Transport ==
- Changxing railway station
- Changxing South railway station
- China National Highway 318
- Nanjing–Hangzhou high-speed railway

== Industry ==
The largest industries in Changxing county are pattern weaving, machine building and electronics, information technology, and biopharmaceuticals. Some notable companies and enterprises in the county include Hisense air conditioner, Changsheng Group, Zhejiang Changtong, Kingsafe, Top Mondial, and Ju'nen Balance Drink.

== Culture ==
The local "Hundred-leaves dragon dance" (百叶龙舞) features a dragon made from hundreds of lotus leaves.
