= Xuancheng–Hangzhou railway =

Railway line in China

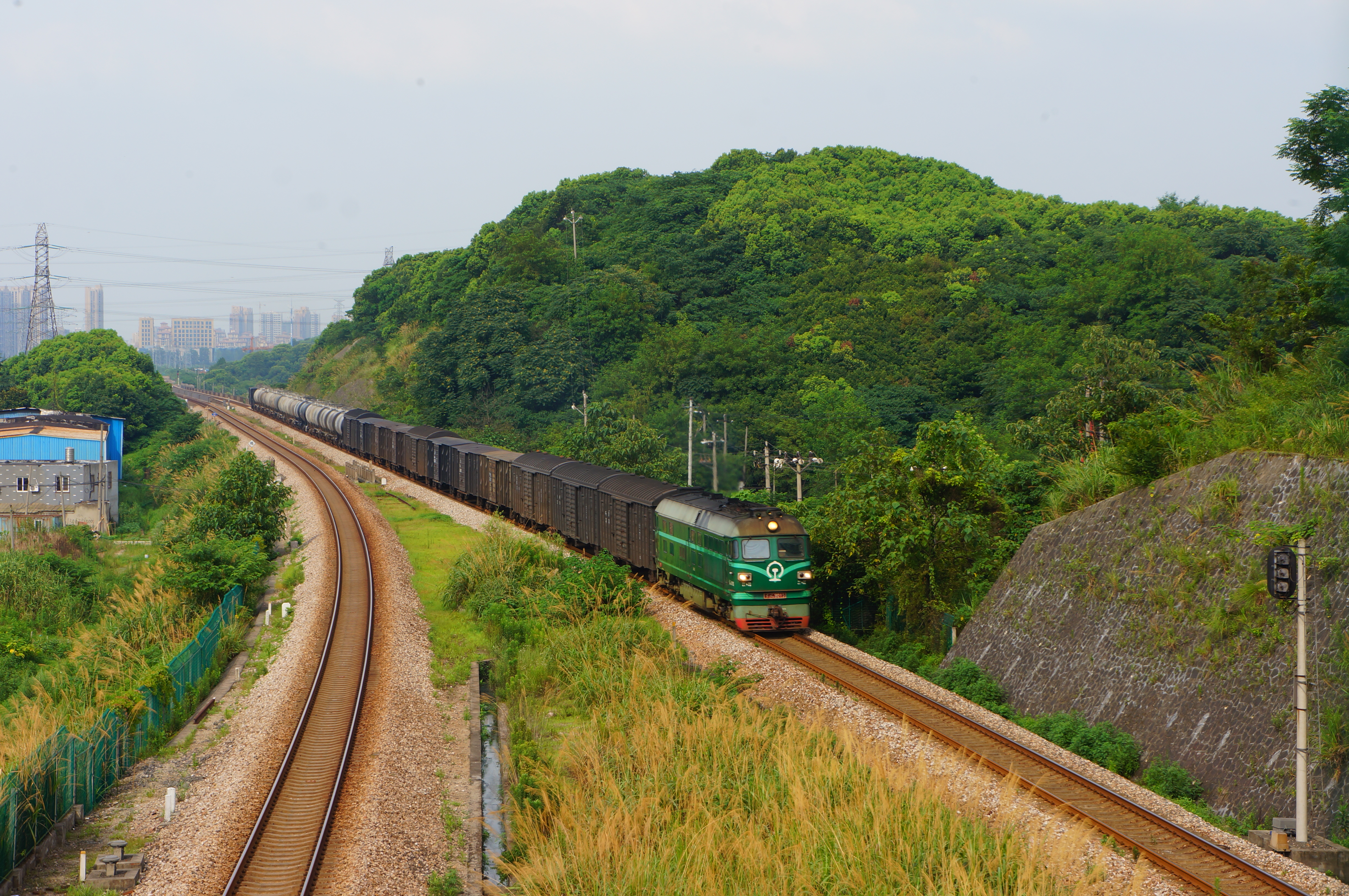
Xuancheng–Hangzhou railway

The Xuancheng–Hangzhou railway or Xuanhang railway (simplified Chinese: 宣杭铁路; traditional Chinese: 宣杭鐵路; pinyin: xuānháng tiělù) is a double-track railroad in eastern China between Xuancheng in southern Anhui Province and Hangzhou, the capital of Zhejiang Province. The line is 224 km (139 mi) long and was built in three parts, in 1958, 1972 and 1988. Cities along the route include Hangzhou, Deqing (access point to Moganshan), Huzhou, and Changxing in Zhejiang Province and Guangde, Shizipu and Xuancheng in Anhui Province. In 2005, a second track was added to the Xuanhang Line.

== History ==
The oldest section on the Xuanhang railway is the 42 km (26 mi) section between Changxing and Niutoushan called the Changxing-Niutoushan railway or Changniu railway. This section was built in 1958 to transport coal from Niutoushan to northern Zhejiang. In 1972, with the completion of the Hangzhou–Huzhou railway, the Changniu Line was extended to Hangzhou in the east, and called the Hangzhou–Niutoushan railway or Hangniu railway. In 1986, work began on the extension of the line to Xuancheng on the Anhui–Jiangxi railway, and the entire Hangzhou–Xuancheng railway entered into operation in 1988. In 2003, construction began on a 224 km second track, which was completed in 2005. The second track enabled traveling speed on the line to reach 140 km/h.

== Rail connections ==
- Xuancheng: Anhui–Jiangxi railway
- Hangzhou: Shanghai–Kunming railway

At Huzhou, the railway runs parallel to the Nanjing-Hangzhou high-speed railway. Connections between the two lines can be made at Huzhou railway station.

== See also ==
- List of railways in China
