= Nanjing–Hangzhou high-speed railway =

Railway line in China

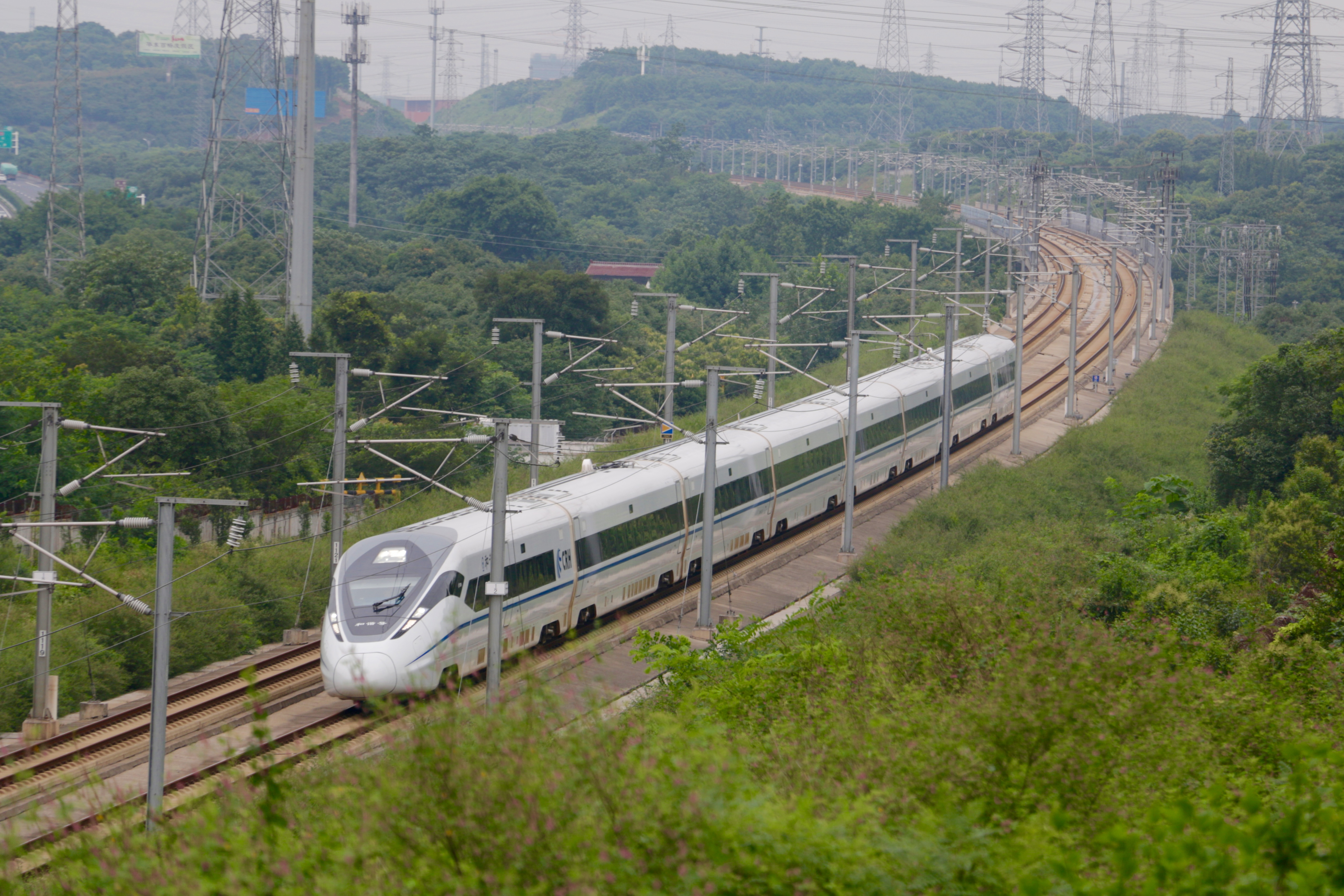
- CRH380D on the Nanjing-Hangzhou passenger railway

Overview
- Other name(s): Nanjing-Hangzhou passenger dedicated line Nanjing-Hangzhou intercity railway
- Native name: 宁杭高速铁路 宁杭高铁 宁杭客运专线 宁杭城际铁路
- Status: Operational
- Owner: Nanjing-Hangzhou Railway Company Limited
- Locale: Jiangsu and Zhejiang provinces
- Termini: Nanjing South railway station; Hangzhou East
- Stations: 11 (sites reserved for 2 more stations)

Service
- Type: High-speed rail
- System: Jiangsu Yangtze Metropolitan Belt intercity railway; China Railway High-speed
- Operator(s): CR Shanghai
- Ridership: 80 million person/year (est)

History
- Opened: July 1, 2013

Technical
- Line length: 249 km (155 mi)
- Number of tracks: 2 (Double-track)
- Track gauge: 1,435 mm (4 ft 8 1/2 in) standard gauge
- Minimum radius: 7,000 m (4.3 mi) (reduced near junctions)
- Electrification: 25 kV 50 Hz AC (Overhead line)
- Operating speed: 350 km/h (220 mph)
- Signalling: ABS and CTCS-3
- Maximum incline: 1.2% 2.0% (on short sections)

The Nanjing–Hangzhou high-speed railway (or Ninghang high-speed railway)(Chinese: 宁杭高速铁路; pinyin: Níng-Háng gāosù tiělù) is a high-speed rail (maximum speed 350 km/h), passenger-dedicated line in eastern China between Nanjing (shorthand name Níng) and Hangzhou, the capitals of Jiangsu and Zhejiang provinces, respectively. During the planning and early construction stage, the railway was originally referred to as the Nanjing–Hangzhou intercity railway or Ninghang intercity railway (simplified Chinese: 宁杭城际铁路; traditional Chinese: 寧杭城際鐵路; pinyin: níngháng chéngjì tiělù). Recent publications don't use the "intercity" designation anymore, perhaps in recognition of the fact that the railway will be used not only by regional trains but long-distance trains as well.

The line is 249 km (155 mi) long (including 147 km or 91 mi in Jiangsu and 102 km or 63 mi in Zhejiang) and has 11 stations: Nanjing South, Jiangning District, Lishui County, Liyang, Yixing in Jiangsu and Changxing County, Huzhou South, Deqing County, Yuhang District and Hangzhou East in Zhejiang. The line is the first direct high-speed railway line between Nanjing and Hangzhou and reduced travel time by rail from nearly two hours to 50 minutes as direct trains no longer need to travel through Shanghai. Construction began in 2008 and the line was opened on July 1, 2013.

Hangning HSR map to scale.

Near Huzhou, this railway runs parallel to the Xuancheng-Hangzhou railway. Connections between the two lines can be made at Huzhou railway station.
