= Pangong Bridge =

Pangong Bridge 潘公桥
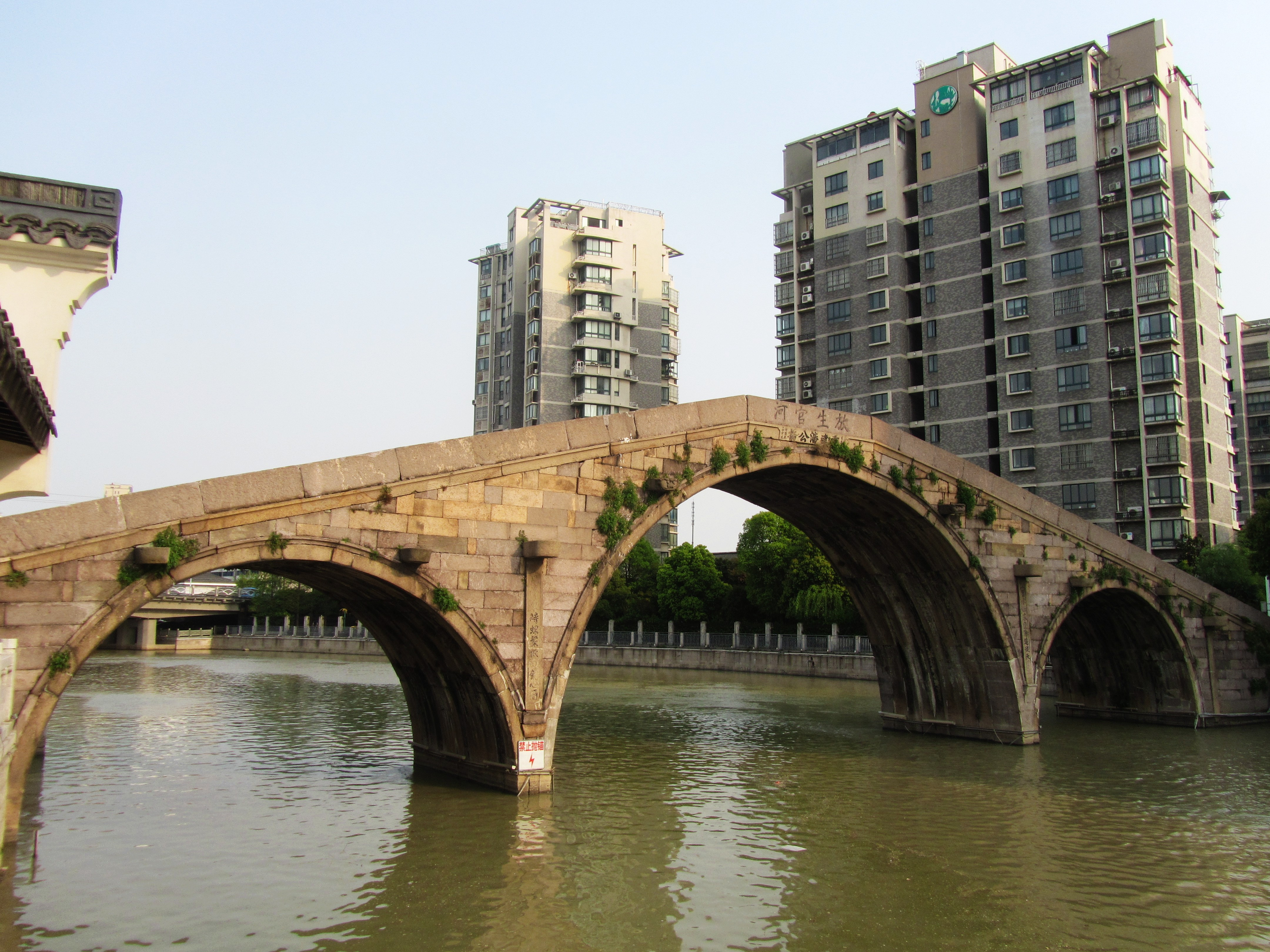
- Pangong Bridge in April 2013
- Coordinates: 30°52′42″N 120°07′14″E
- Carries: Pedestrians
- Crosses: Free Life River
- Locale: Longquan Subdistrict, Wuxing District of Huzhou, Zhejiang, China

Characteristics
- Design: Arch bridge
- Material: Stone
- Total length: 57.5 metres (189 ft)
- Width: 6.6 metres (22 ft)
- Height: 9.5 metres (31 ft)

History
- Construction start: 1585
- Construction end: 1590
- Rebuilt: 1839

The Pangong Bridge (simplified Chinese: 潘公桥; traditional Chinese: 潘公橋; pinyin: Pāngōng Qiáo) is a historic stone arch bridge over the Free Life River in Longquan Subdistrict, Wuxing District of Huzhou, Zhejiang, China. The bridge measures 57.5 metres (189 ft) long, 6.6 metres (22 ft) wide, and approximately 9.5 metres (31 ft) high.

== Etymology ==
Pangong Bridge is named after Pan Jixun (潘季驯), commonly known as Pan Gong (潘公).

== History ==
Construction of the Pangong Bridge, designed by scholar-official and hydrologist Pan Jixun, commenced in 1585 and was completed in 1590, during the ruling of Wanli Emperor of the Ming dynasty (1368–1644). In 1839, in the 19th year of the Daoguang period of the Qing dynasty (1644–1911), the original five-hole stone beam bridge was changed into a three-hole stone arch bridge to increase the water discharge.

On 6 May 2013, it was listed among the seventh batch of "Major National Historical and Cultural Sites in Zhejiang" by the State Council of China.

== Gallery ==
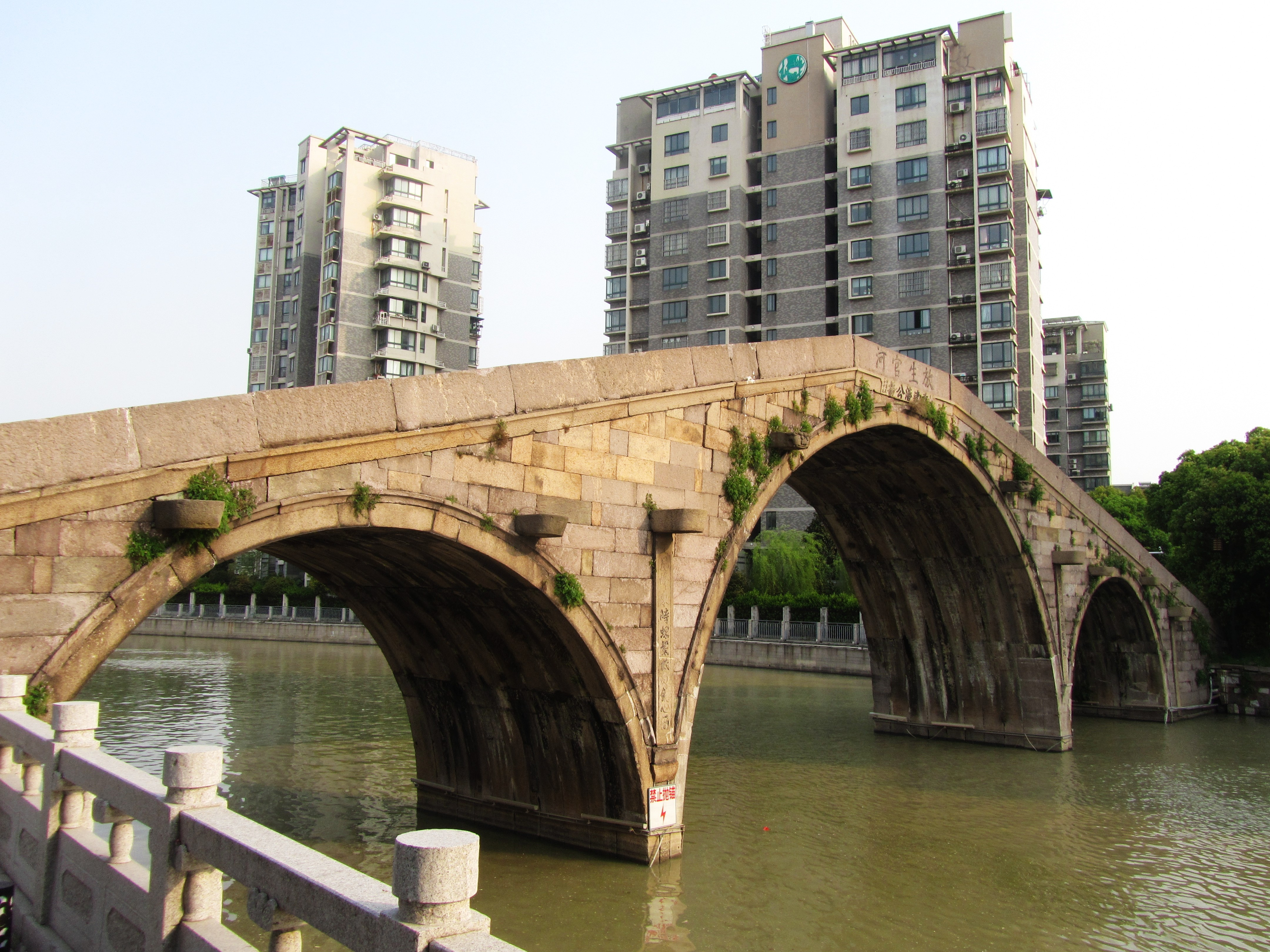
Pangong Bridge in April 2013

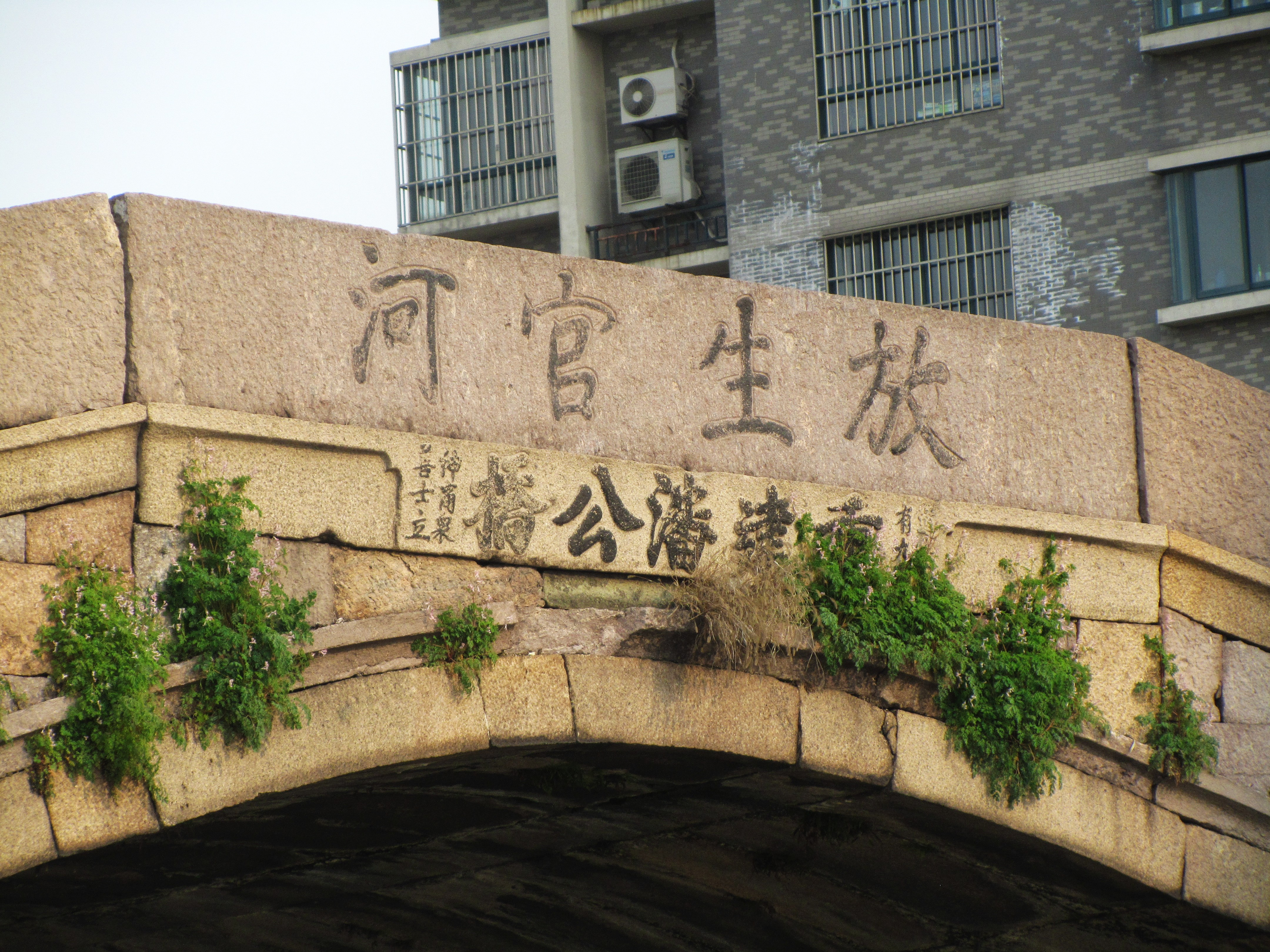
Pangong Bridge in April 2013

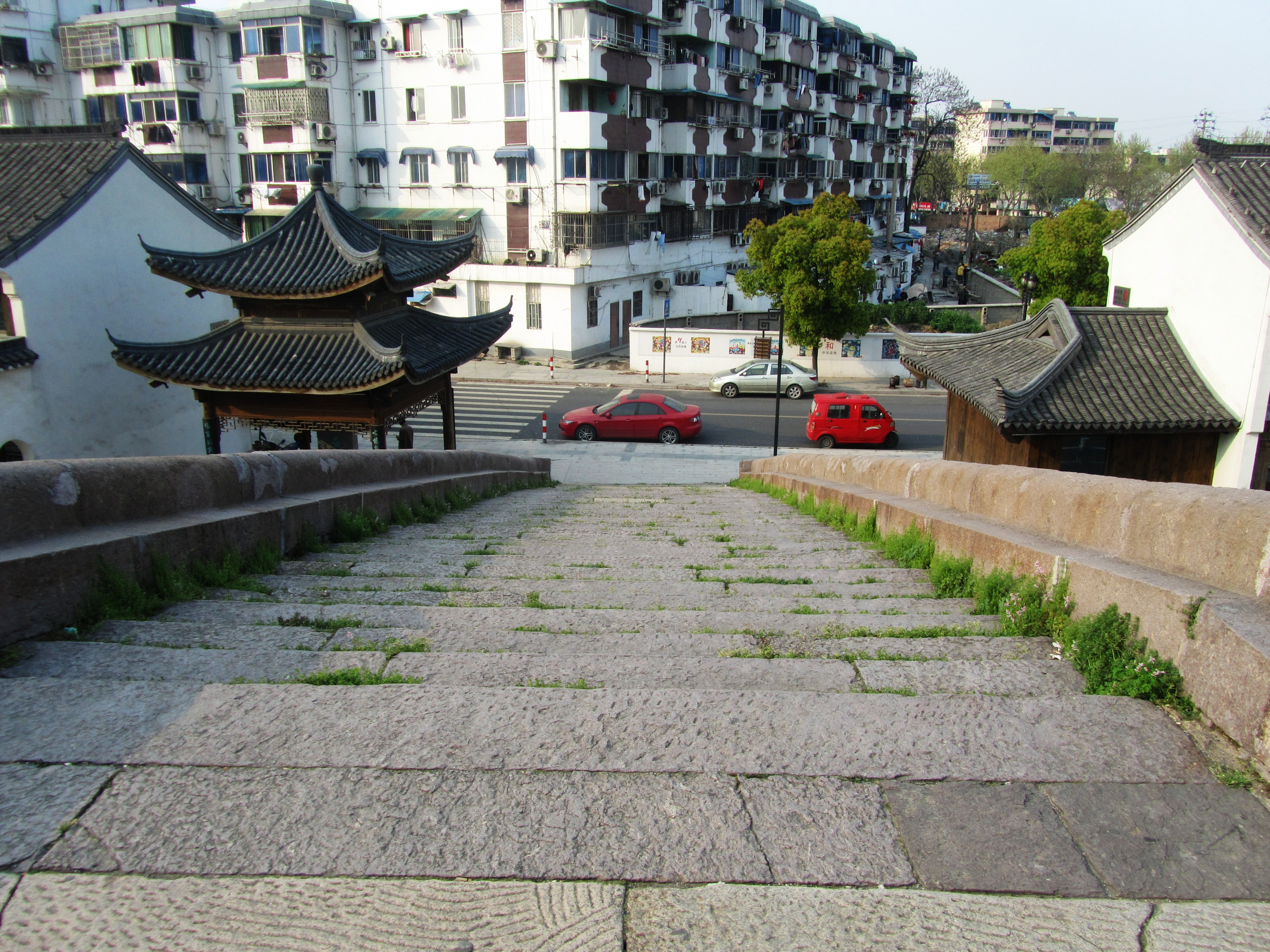
Pangong Bridge in April 2013

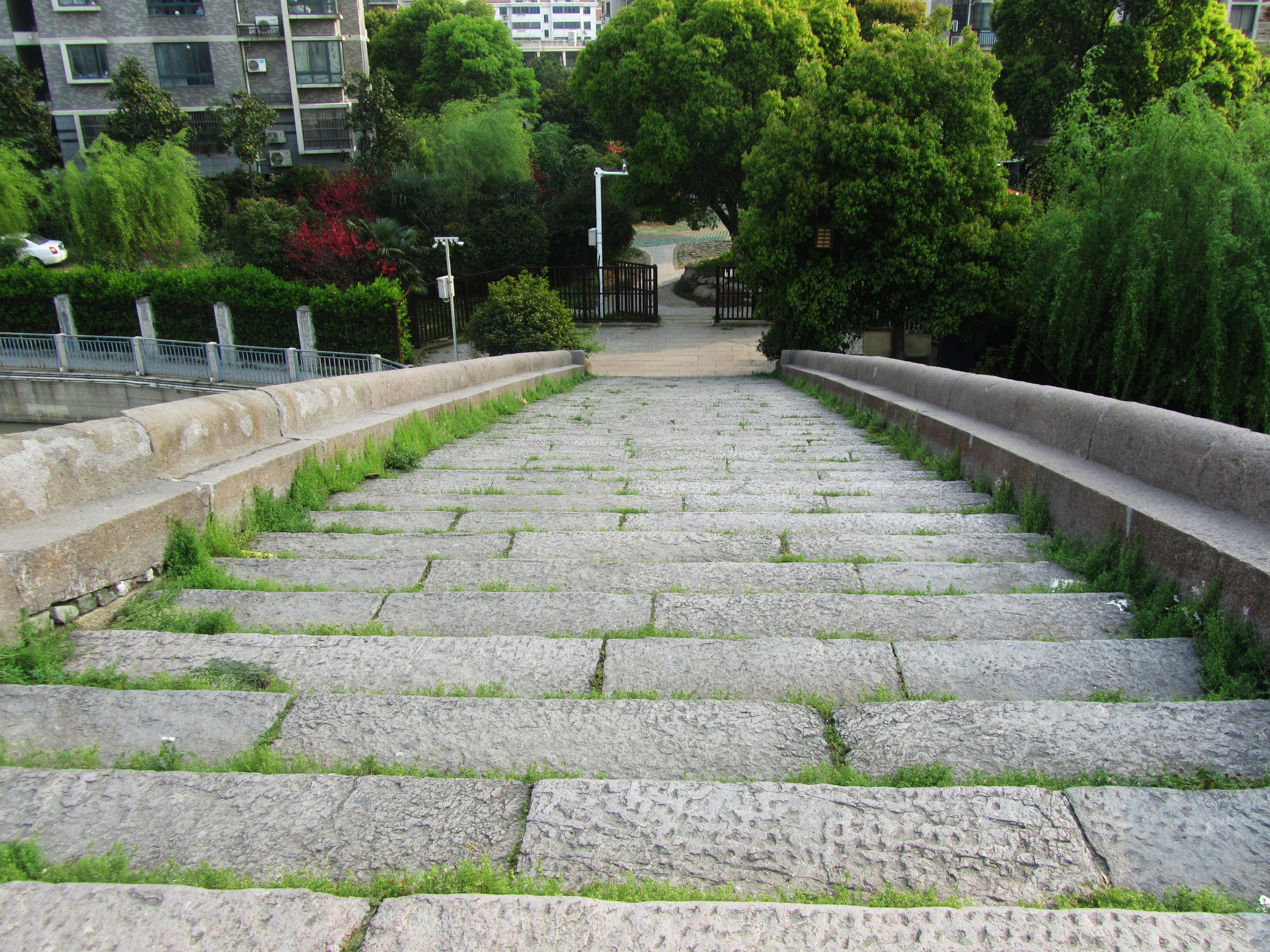
Pangong Bridge in April 2013

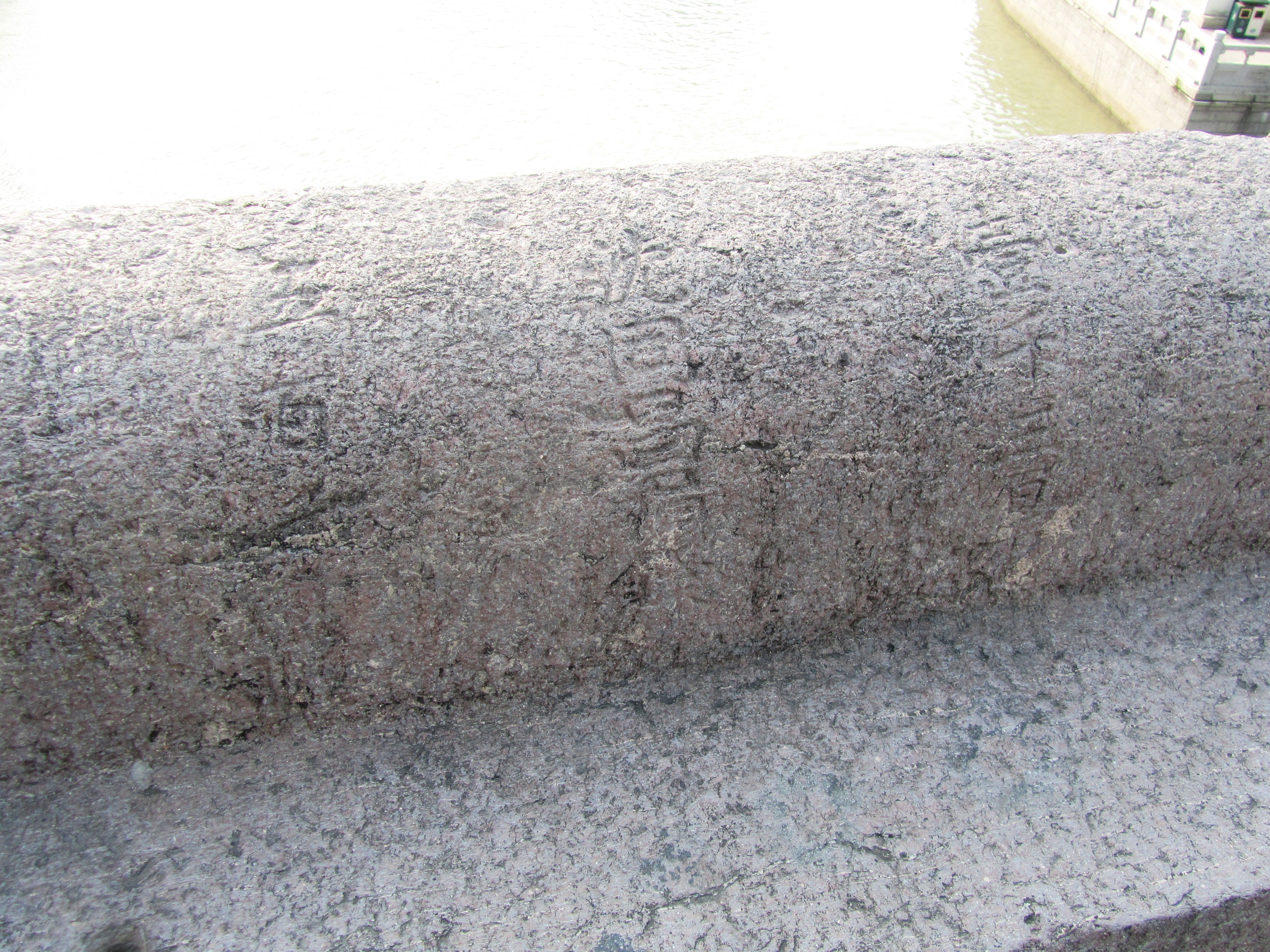
Pangong Bridge in April 2013

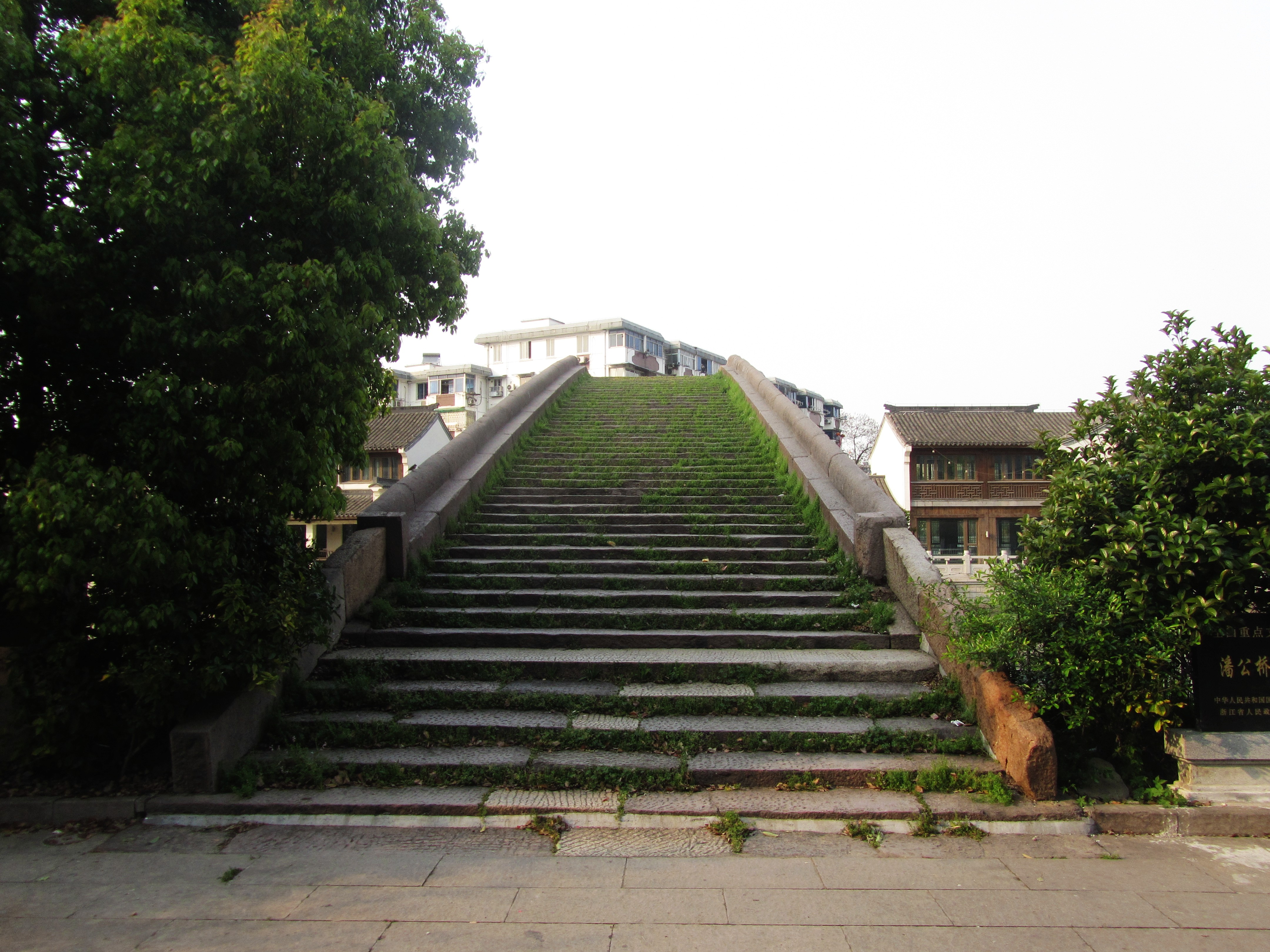
Pangong Bridge in April 2013
