= Huzhou Taihu Lake Moon Hot Spring Resort =

Building in Huzhou, China

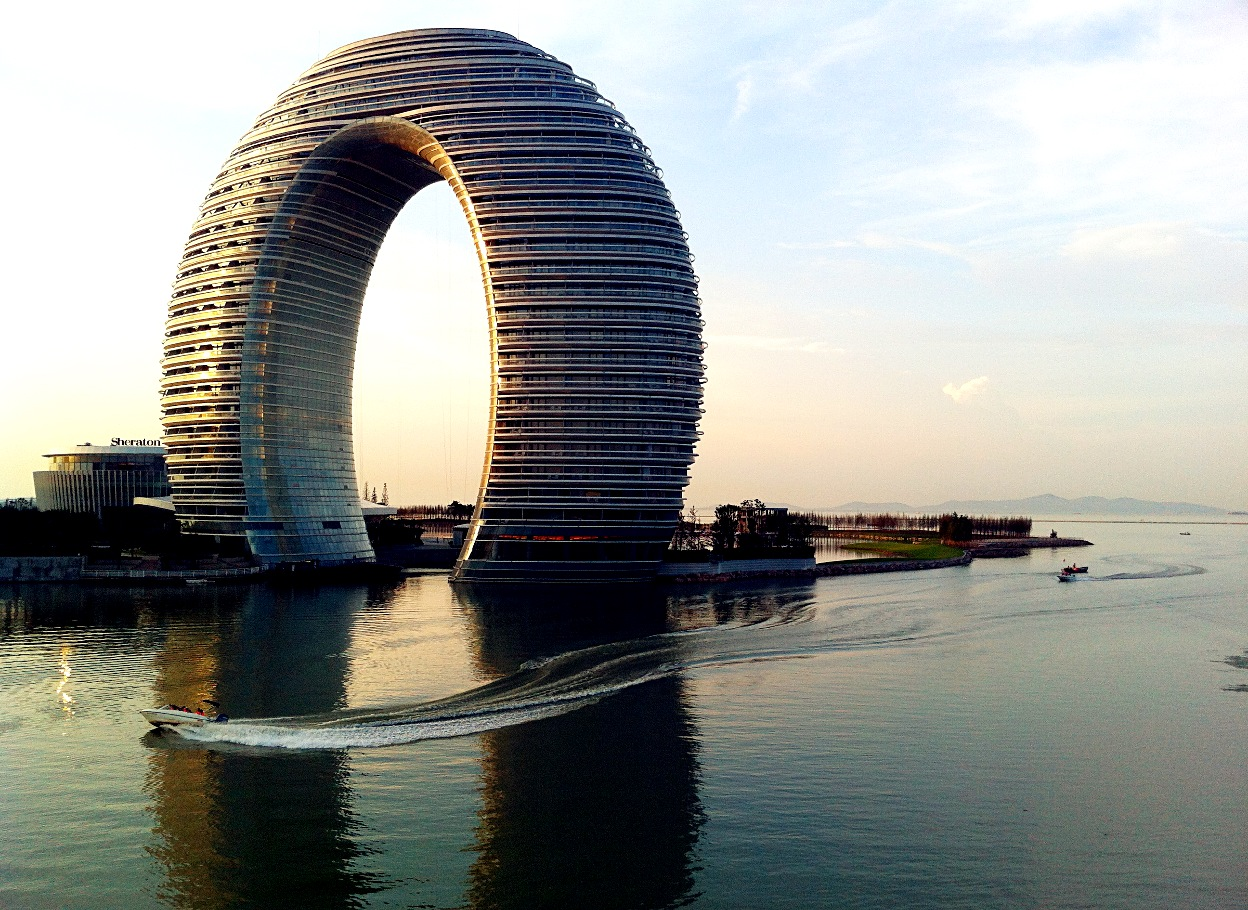
- Huzhou Taihu Lake Moon Hot Spring Resort exterior night view from Lake Tai.

General information
- Status: Completed
- Type: Hotel/Resort
- Location: No. 5858 Taihu Rd, Wuxing District, Huzhou, Zhejiang, China
- Coordinates: 30°57′33.28″N 120°6′12.62″E
- Completed: October 2013; 13 years ago

Technical details
- Floor count: 27

Design and construction
- Architect: Yansong Ma
- Main contractor: Shanghai Feizhou Group

Other information
- Number of rooms: 321

The Huzhou Taihu Lake Moon Hot Spring Resort is a 10-story luxury hotel and resort on Lake Tai in Huzhou, China, between Nanjing and Shanghai. It has been nicknamed the "Horseshoe Hotel" and "Doughnut Hotel" due to its Torus geometrical shape. The 4½-star resort has 321 rooms, 37 villas, 40 suites, a presidential suite, parking facilities, fitness & wellness center, four restaurants, a café, a children's pool, and rooms with terraces.

The hotel was designed by architect Yansong Ma and constructed by the Shanghai Feizhou Group. Completed in 2013 as the Sheraton Huzhou Hot Spring Resort (Chinese: 浙江湖州喜来登温泉度假酒店), it was awarded 3rd place from the Emporis Skyscraper Awards, as the third best "new skyscraper for design and functionality" completed that year.

On October 1, 2026, the hotel left Marriott and was renamed Huzhou Taihu Lake Moon Hot Spring Resort.
