= Chaoyin Bridge =

Chaoyin Bridge 潮音桥
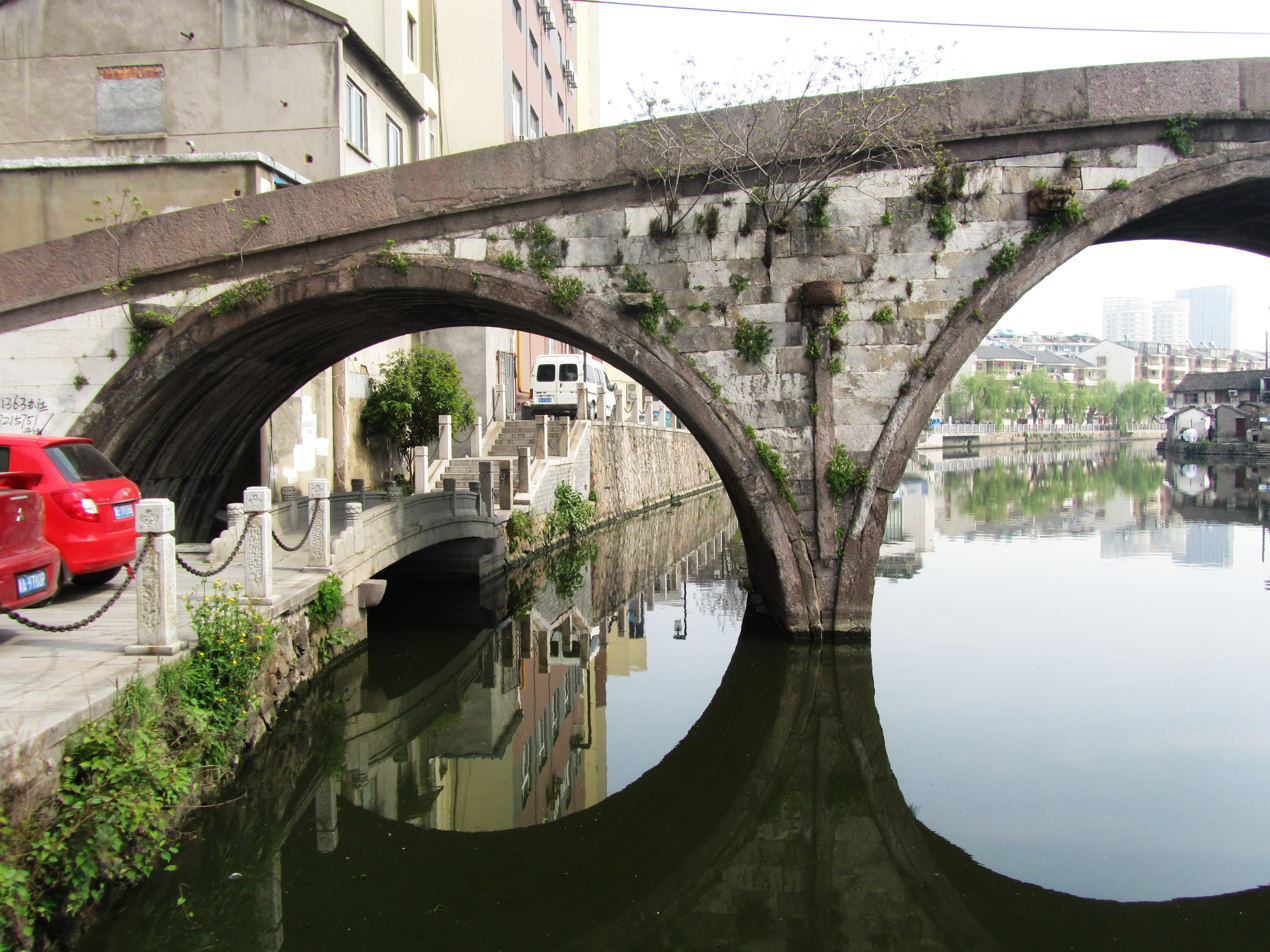
- Chaoyin Bridge in April 2014
- Coordinates: 30°51′47″N 120°06′22″E
- Carries: Pedestrians
- Crosses: Tiao Stream
- Locale: Chaoyang Subdistrict, Wuxing District of Huzhou, Zhejiang, China

Characteristics
- Design: Arch bridge
- Material: Stone
- Total length: 50 metres (160 ft)
- Width: 5 metres (16 ft)
- Height: 7 metres (23 ft)

History
- Construction end: 1539
- Rebuilt: 1605

Location
- Interactive map of Chaoyin Bridge

The Chaoyin Bridge (simplified Chinese: 潮音桥; traditional Chinese: 潮音橋; pinyin: Cháoyīn Qiáo) is a historic stone arch bridge over the Tiao Stream in Chaoyang Subdistrict, Wuxing District of Huzhou, Zhejiang, China. The bridge measures 50 metres (160 ft) long, 5 metres (16 ft) wide, and approximately 7 metres (23 ft) high.

== Etymology ==
Chaoyin Bridge is named after "Chaoyin Ferry" (潮音渡).

== History ==
Chaoyin Bridge was originally built in 1539, during Jiajing Emperor's reign of the Ming dynasty (1644–1911). The present version was completed in 1605, during the ruling of Wanli Emperor.

On 7 October 2019, it was listed among the eighth batch of "Major National Historical and Cultural Sites in Zhejiang" by the State Council of China.

== Gallery ==
Media related to Chaoyin Bridge at Wikimedia Commons

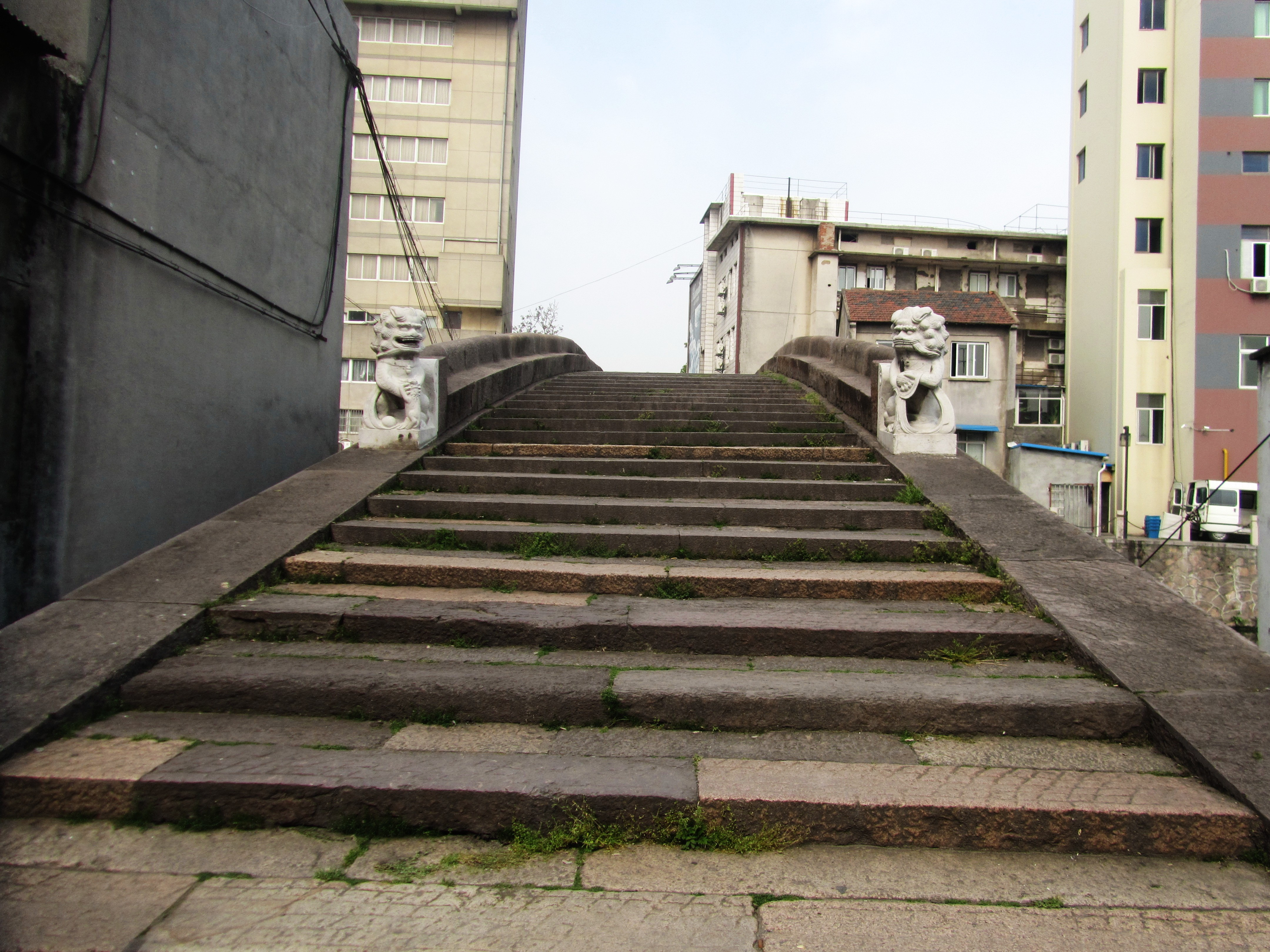

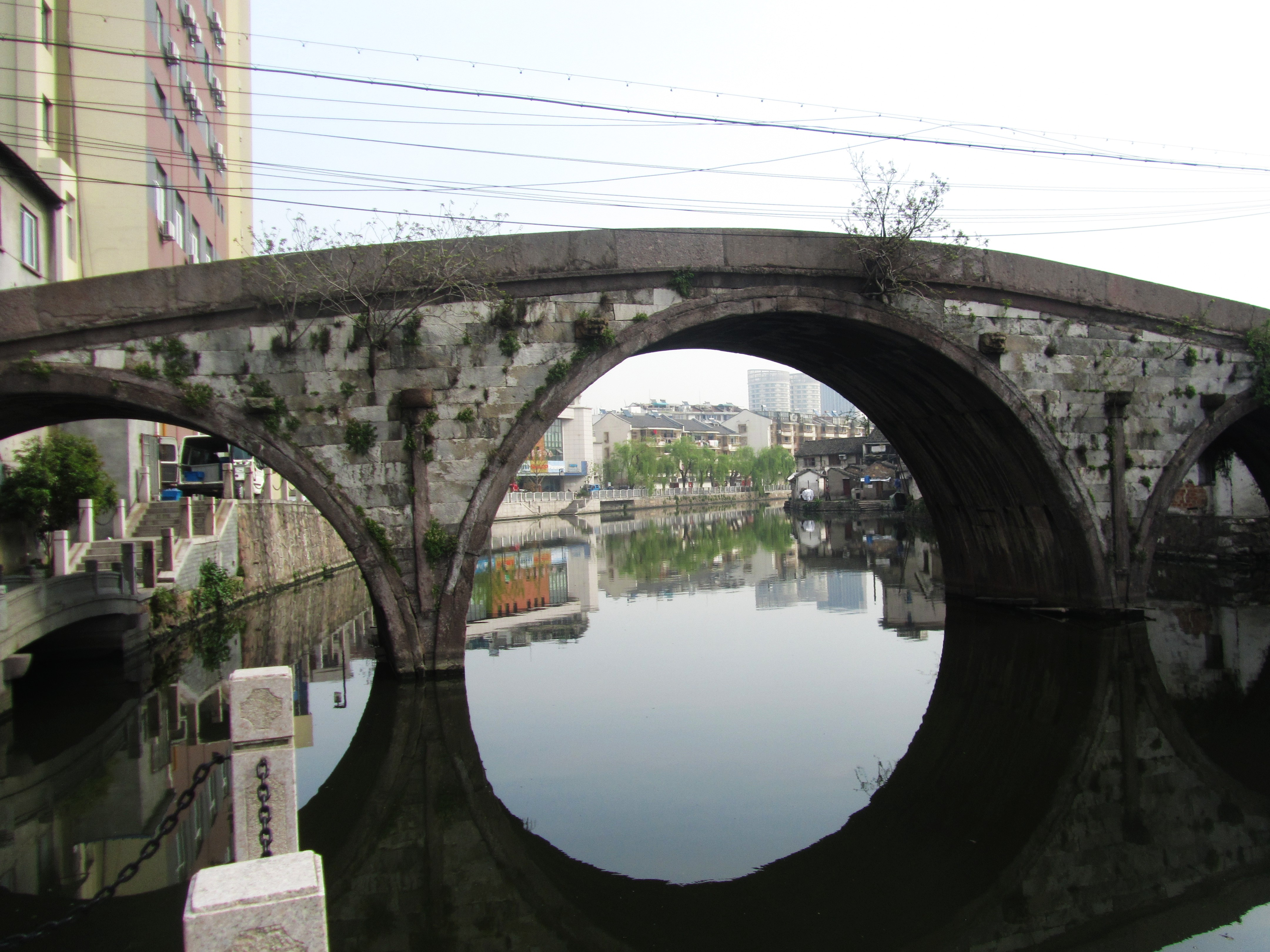

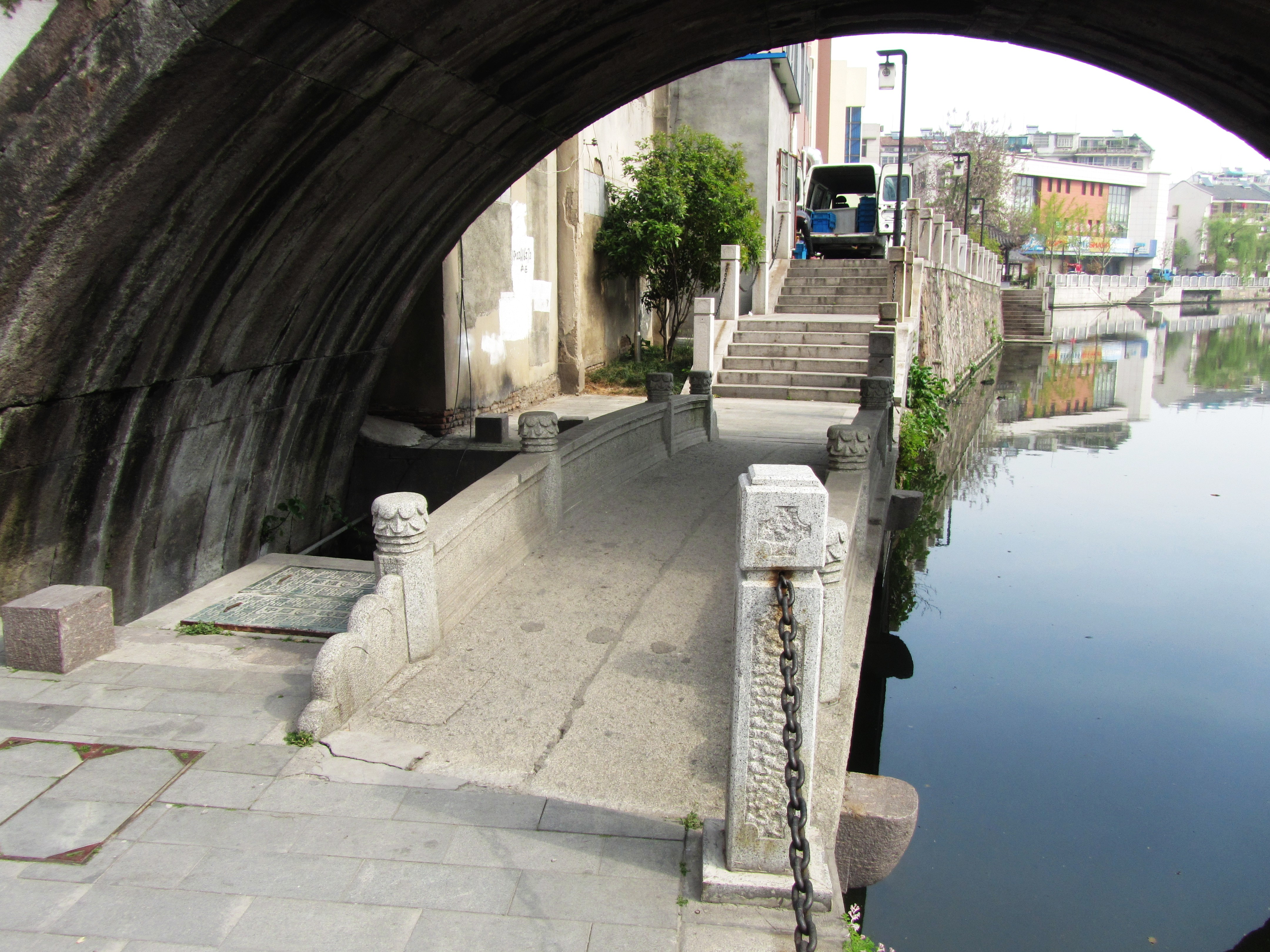

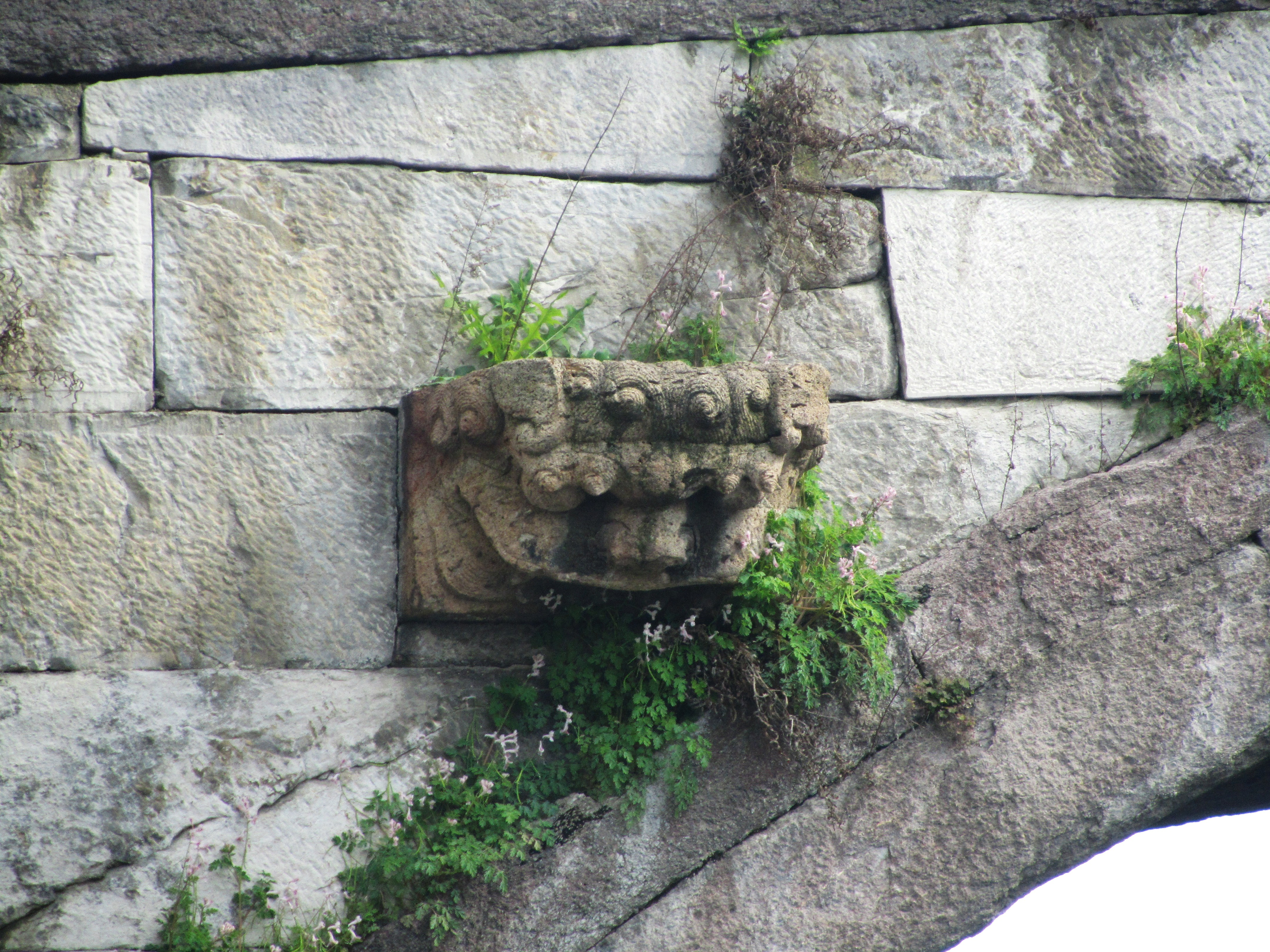
Stone beast on the Bridge

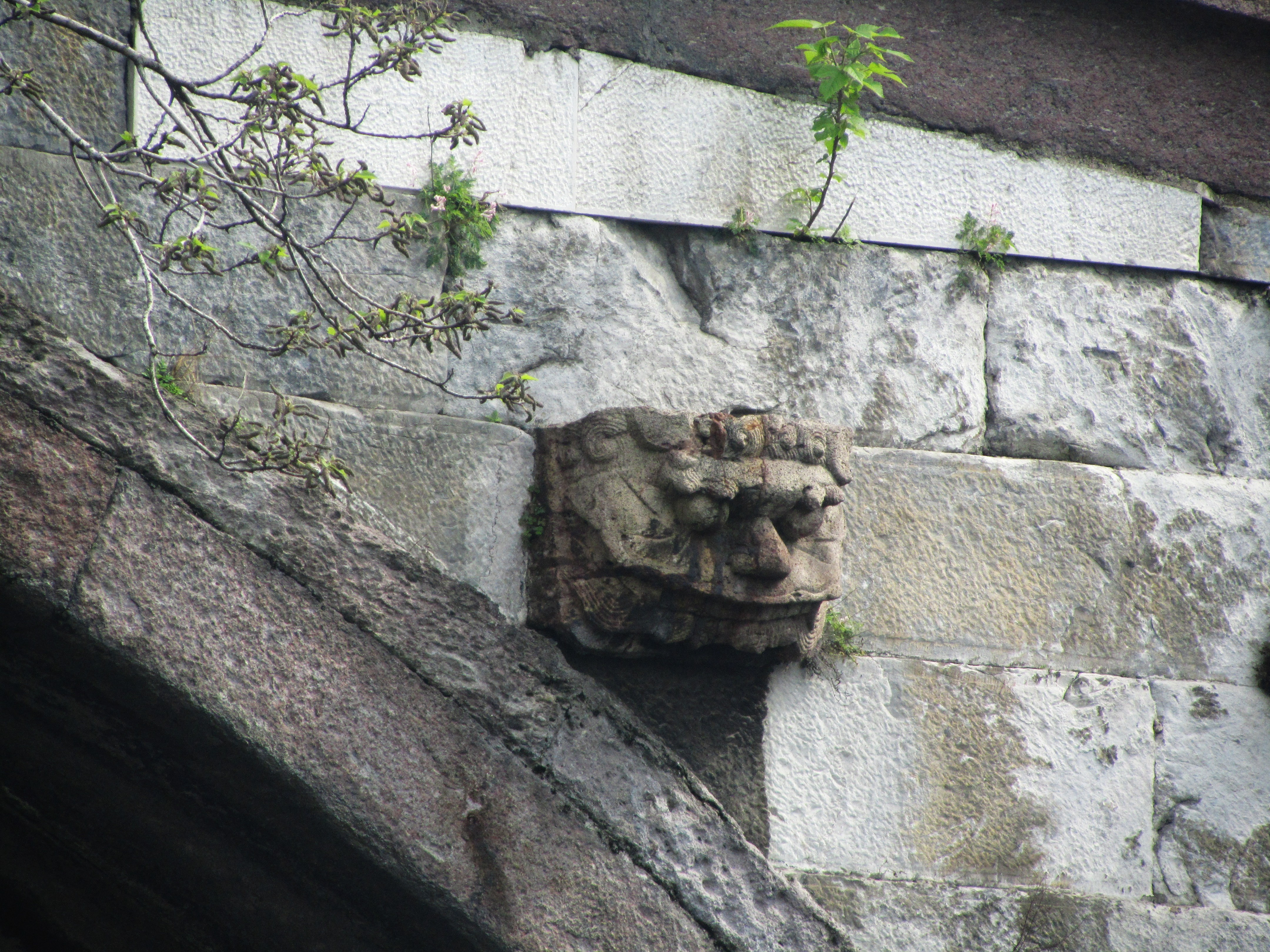
Stone beast on the Bridge

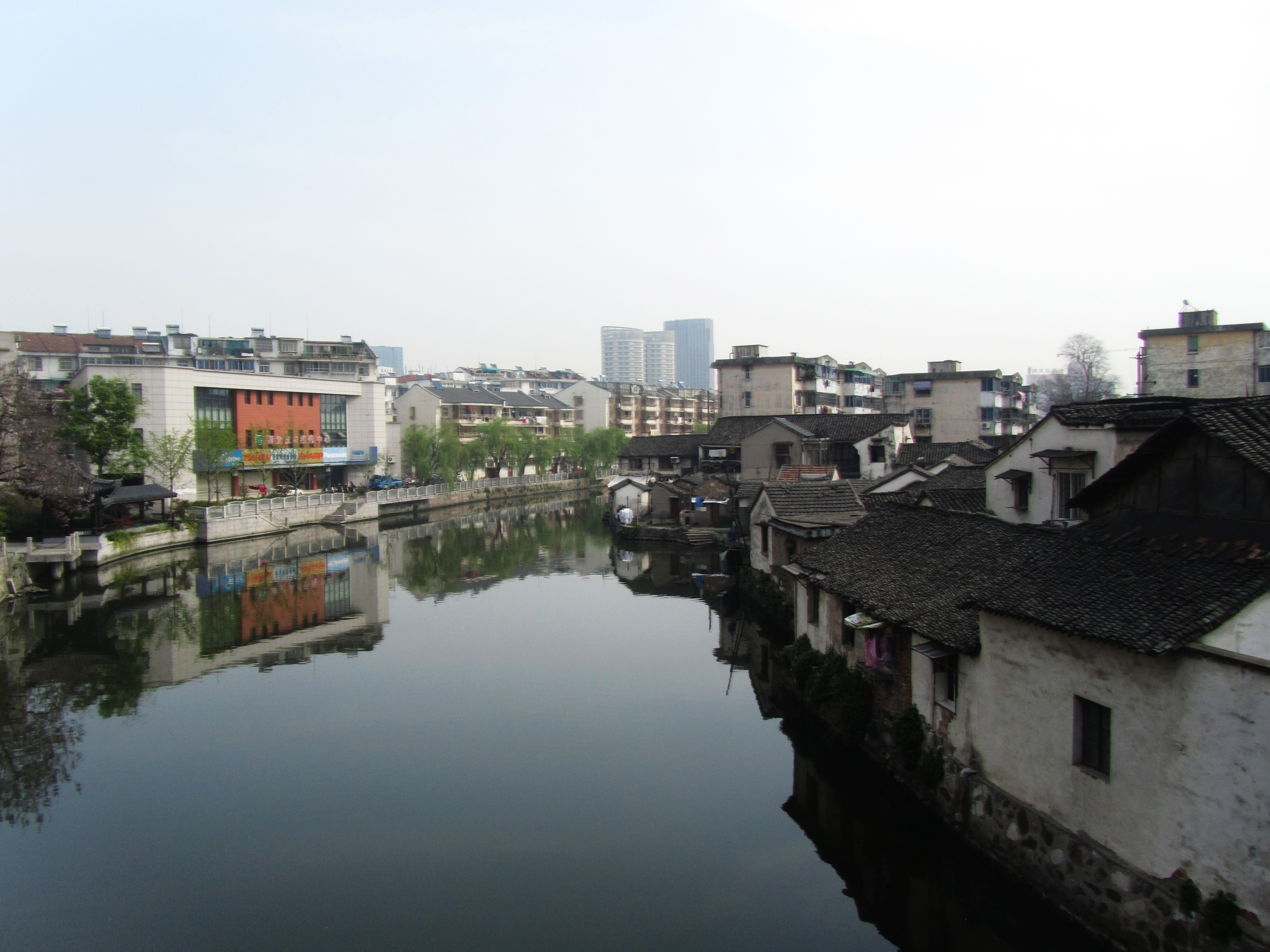
Tiao Stream
