= Guan Daogao =

Chinese calligrapher, poet, and painter

Guan Daogao (1262 – 1319?) was a Chinese calligrapher, poet, and painter who lived during the Yuan Dynasty. She was born in Qixian, Wuxing (modern-day Huzhou, Zhejiang Province). She is known for the Avolokitesvara Saddarapundarika Sutra (Guanshiyin pumempin).
