= Yao Yongchen =

- 姚勇忱
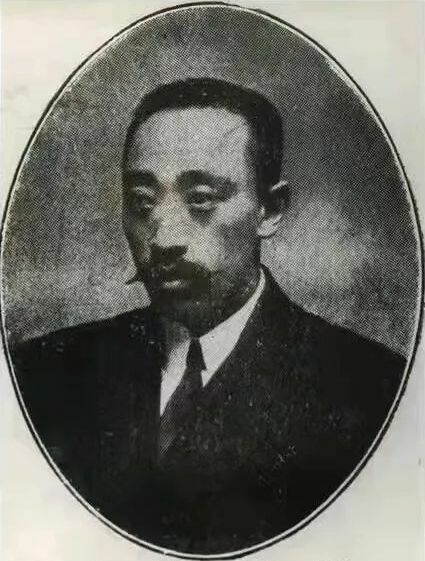

Personal details
- Born: Yao Zhiqiang (姚志強); 1880 Huzhou, Qing Empire
- Died: July 1915 (aged 34–35) Hangzhou, Republic of China
- Party: Guangfuhui; Tongmenghui

Yao Yongchen (1880 – July 1915) was a Chinese revolutionary, writer, and one of the key early members of the Guangfuhui and the Tongmenghui. He was one of the first representatives of the Republic of China (ROC). He was an active participant in the anti-Qing revolutionary movement and later an opponent of Yuan Shikai's authoritarian regime. Yao was arrested and executed with his comrade Wang Jinfa by pro-Yuan authorities in 1915.

== Early life ==
Yao Yongchen was born in 1880 in Zhili Village (now Zhili Town), Wucheng County, Huzhou, Zhejiang Province, during the Qing Dynasty. His name was Yao Zhiqiang (姚志強), while he is well known by one of his courtesy names, Yongchen (勇忱). He also had other courtesy names of Yongzhen (永貞) and Yongcheng (永成), and the art name Yizhong (弋仲). He hailed from a well-off family; his grandfather had served as a candidate Daotai (circuit intendant), while his father was a Xiucai. Orphaned at an early age, Yao assumed the responsibility of raising his younger brother while pursuing his studies.

Despite suffering from chronic lung disease and a stutter, Yao was keen on reading Chinese classics and revolutionary literature. In 1904, he enrolled in the Sericulture School of Hangzhou, where he became increasingly disillusioned with Qing rule after witnessing foreign aggression and governmental corruption.

== Revolutionary activities ==
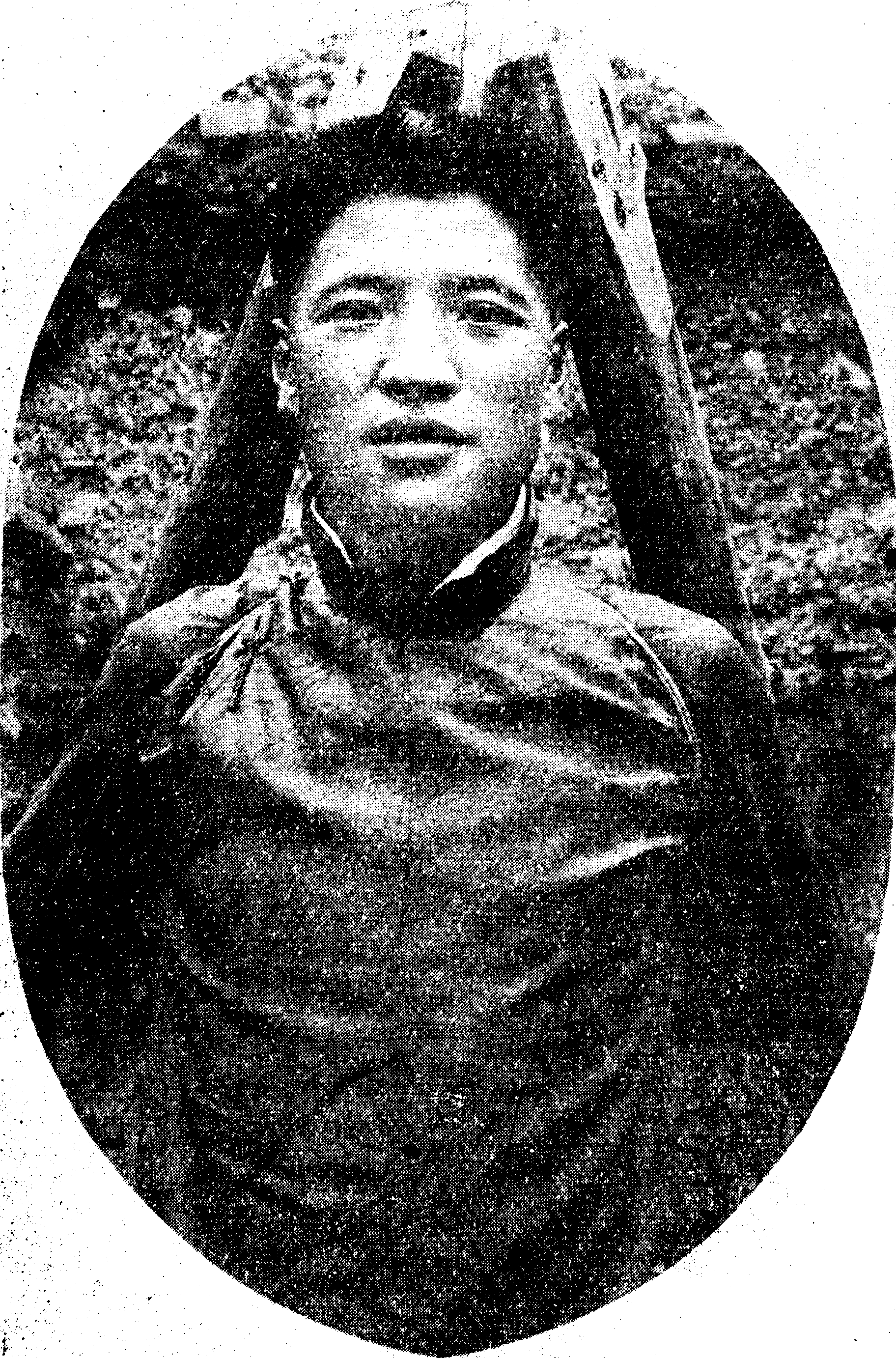
Wang Jinfa, Yao's comrade

Yao joined the Guangfuhui during his student days and later in 1905 he went to Japan to study, where he came into contact with the Tongmenghui, founded by Sun Yat-sen. Upon returning to China, he became an important figure in revolutionary propaganda, organising armed uprisings and contributing articles to publications. He participated in the organisation of the Datong Normal School in Shaoxing, which served as a cover for revolutionary training. There, he worked closely with Qiu Jin and Wang Jinfa to stage uprisings.

In the Xinhai Revolution, Yao helped coordinate uprisings in Zhejiang, and assisted Chen Qimei in organising and leading the Shanghai Uprising.

Following the 1911 Revolution, Yao was elected as a representative of the National Assembly. He then fiercely opposed Yuan Shikai's authoritarian ambitions, issuing public telegrams denouncing Yuan.

== Execution ==
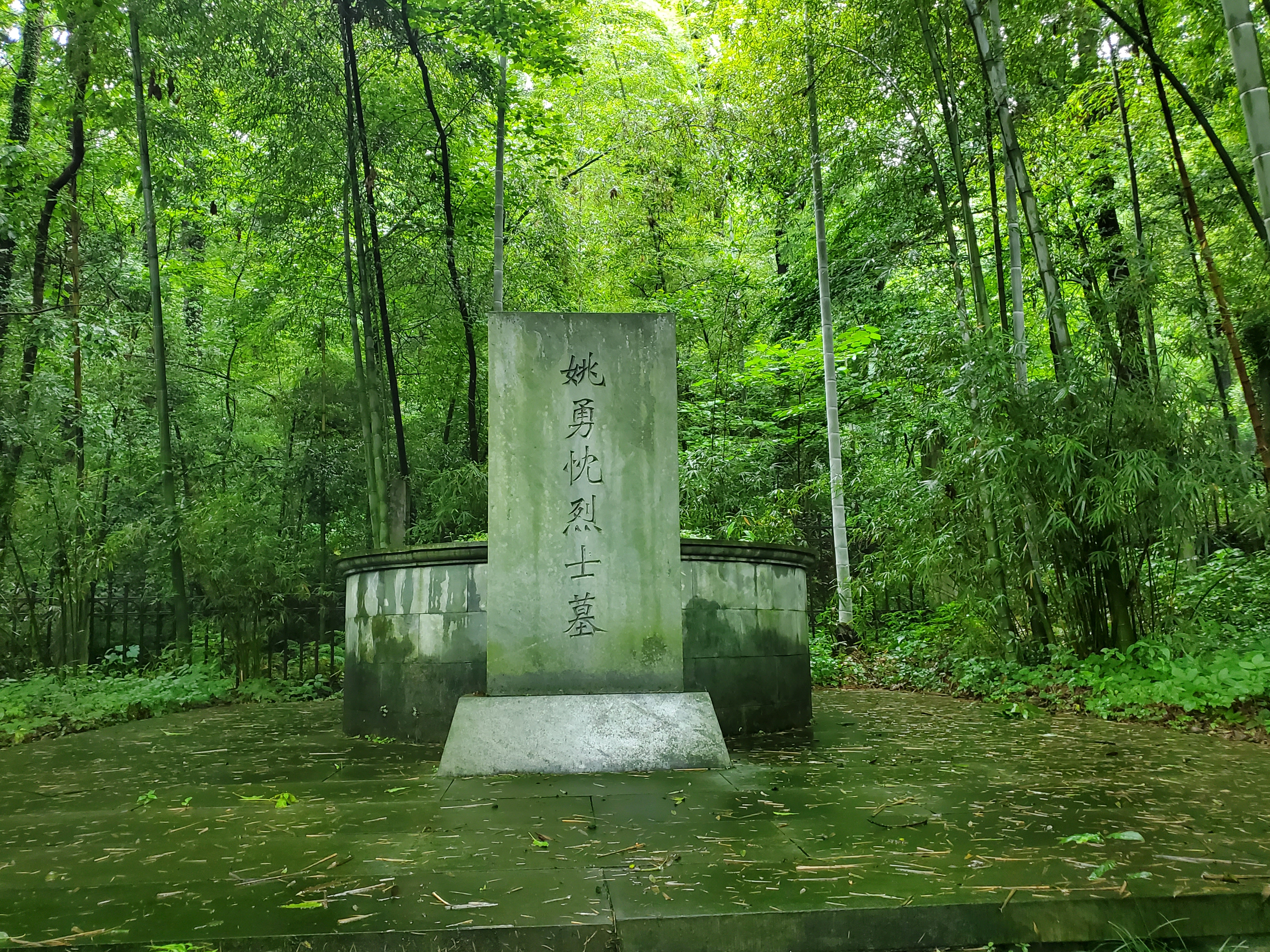
Tomb of Yao Yongchen

In 1915, Yao and his comrade Wang Jinfa were lured to Hangzhou under false pretenses by the pro-Yuan governor Zhu Rui, a former comrade. They were arrested and imprisoned by Zhu. On 2 June, Wang Jinfa was executed. Zhu Rui tried to persuade Yao to surrender, but he refused. A month later, Yao was also executed by firing squad at the Hangzhou Military Prison.

== Legacy ==
In the years following their deaths, Yao Yongchen and Wang Jinfa were officially recognized as martyrs by the government and were buried side by side near West Lake in Hangzhou. After the founding of the People's Republic of China, in 1952, authorities ordered the relocation of their graves. In October 1992, Wang Jinfa's remains were reinterred in his hometown, Shengzhou, Zhejiang. Yao Yongchen's tomb, however, remained in relocation until 2006, when it was finally moved to the Xinhai Revolution Martyrs' Cemetery in Hangzhou.

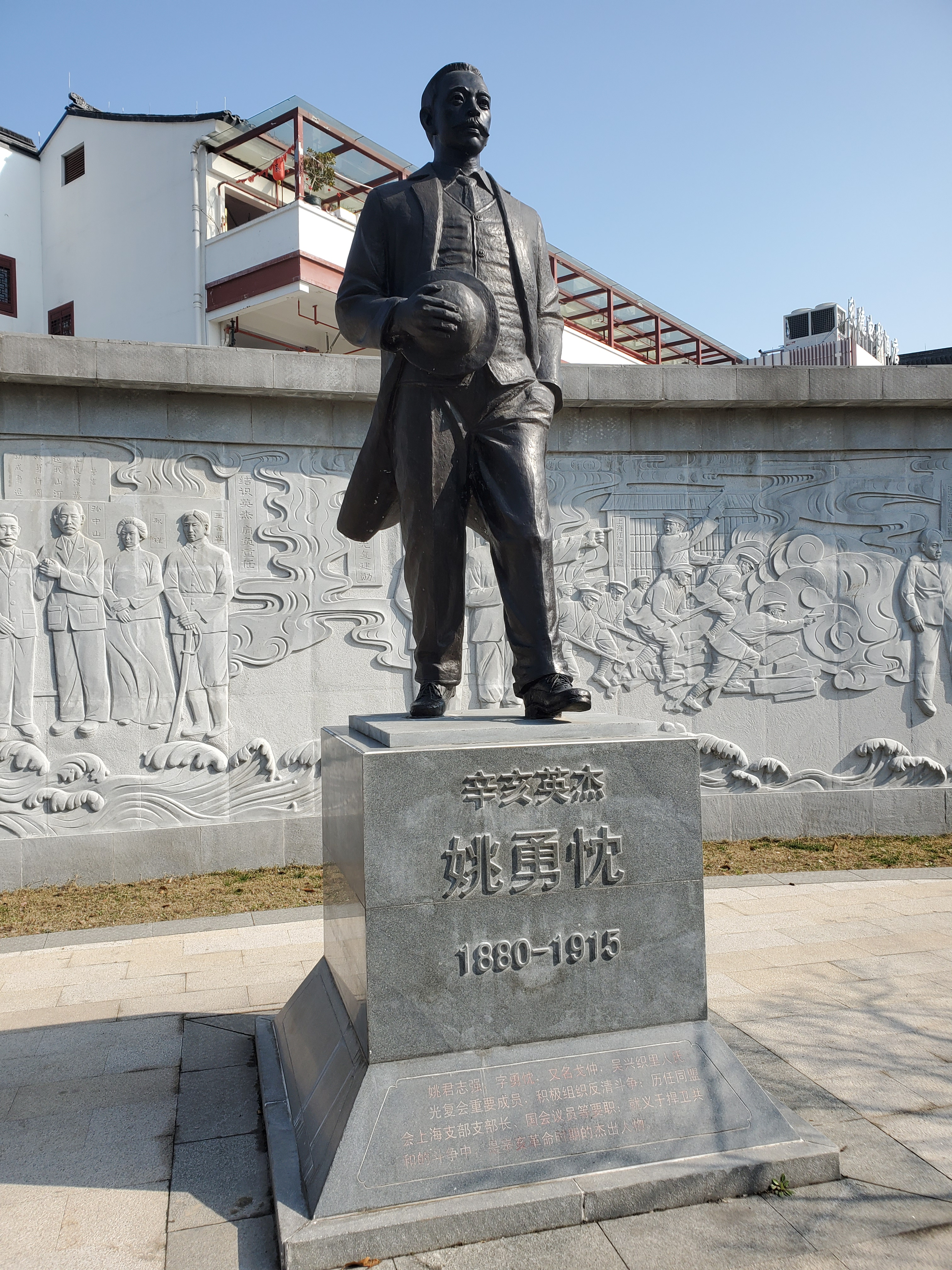
Statue of Yao Yongchen in Zhili

In Zhili Town, Huzhou — Yao Yongchen's hometown — a statue of Yao has been erected to commemorate his contributions and sacrifice.

== Works ==
- Experimental Methods in Silkworm Rearing (實驗養蠶法)
- Methods for Preventing Silkworm Diseases (蠶病預防法)
