= Wuxing, Huzhou =

Wuxing 吴兴区 Wuhing
- District
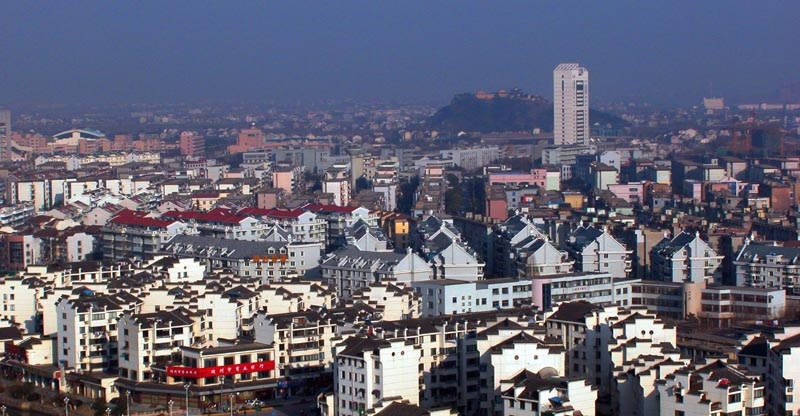

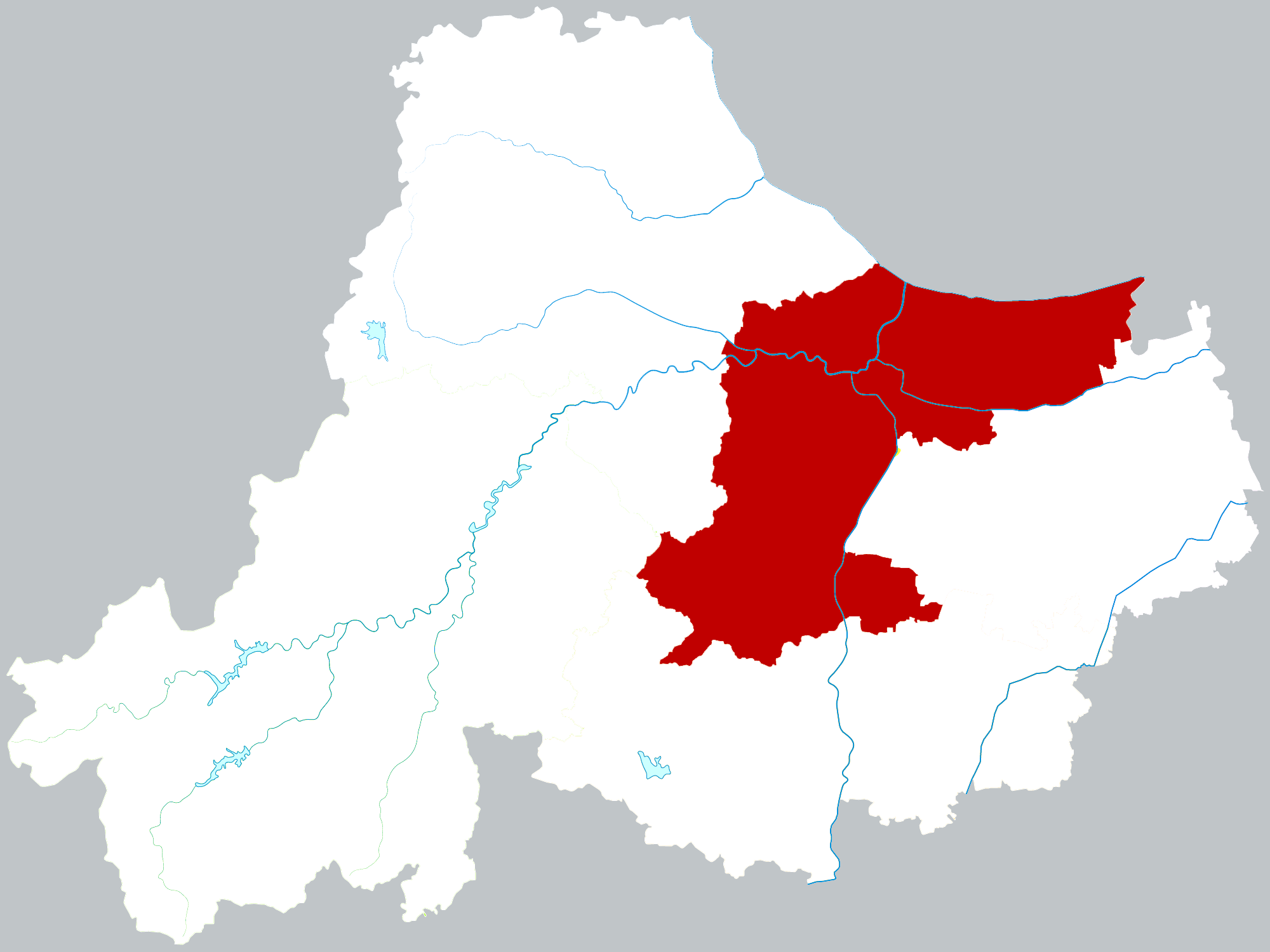
- Location of Wuxing District within Huzhou

- Location in Zhejiang
- Coordinates: 30°52′N 120°06′E
- Country: People's Republic of China
- Province: Zhejiang
- Prefecture-level city: Huzhou

Area
  - Total: 862.72 km^{2} (333.10 sq mi)

Population (2020)
  - Total: 1,015,937
  - Density: 1,177.6/km^{2} (3,050.0/sq mi)
- Time zone: UTC+8 (China Standard)

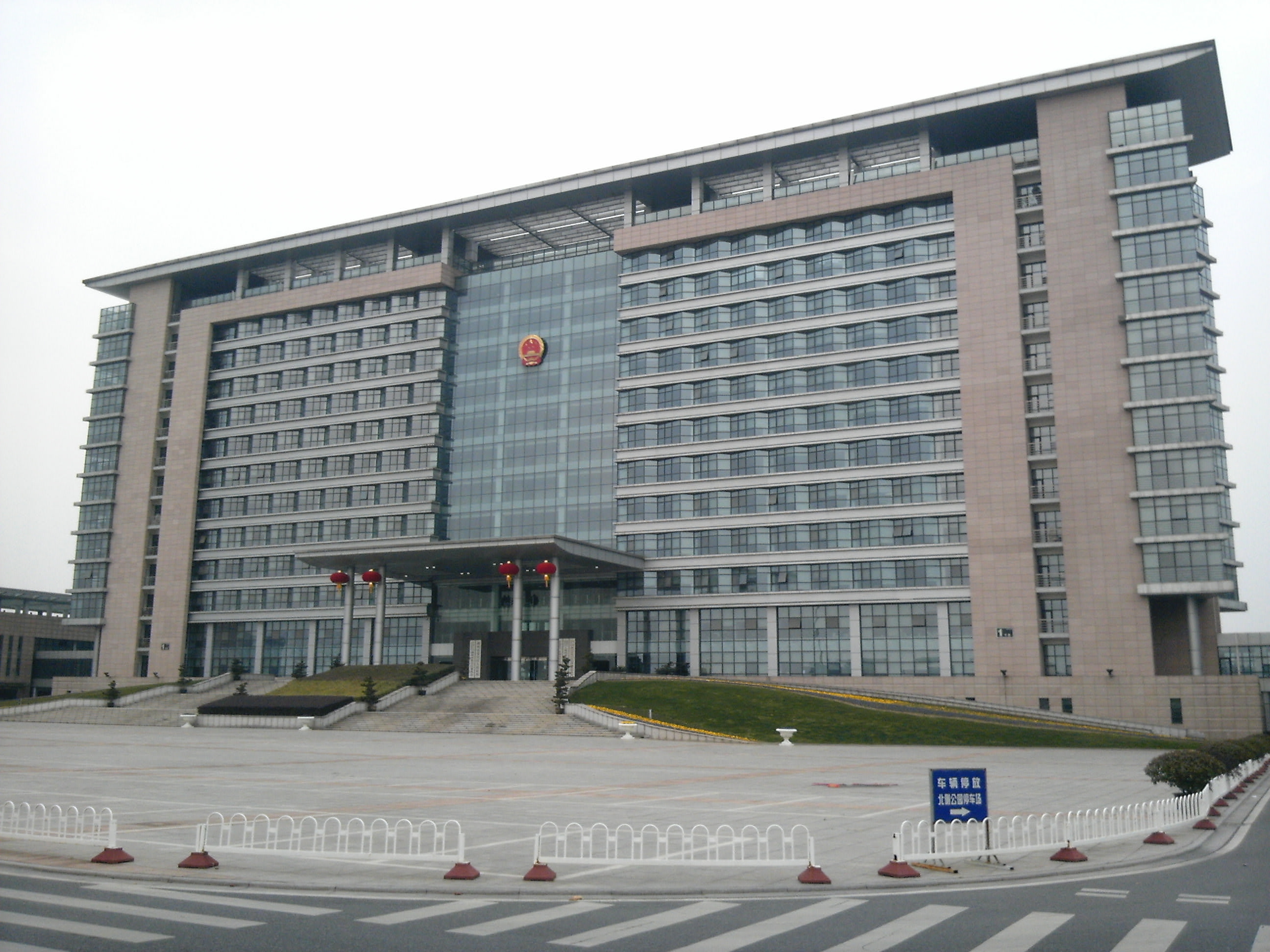
The administrative center of Wuxing District.

Wuxing District (simplified Chinese: 吴兴区; traditional Chinese: 吳興區; pinyin: Wúxīng Qū) is the central district of the prefecture-level city of Huzhou, Zhejiang, China.

== Administrative divisions ==
As of 2020, Wuxing District has 13 Subdistricts and 5 Towns and 1 Townships under its administration.

Wuxing District's 13 Subdistricts are as follows:

- Yuehe Subdistrict (月河街道), Chaoyang Subdistrict (朝阳街道), Aishan Subdistrict (爱山街道), Feiying Subdistrict (飞英街道), Longquan Subdistrict (龙泉街道), Fenghuang Subdistrict (凤凰街道), Kangshan Subdistrict (康山街道), Renhuangshan Subdistrict (仁皇山街道), Binhu Subdistrict (滨湖街道), Longxi Subdistrict (龙溪街道), Yangjiabu Subdistrict (杨家埠街道), Huanzhu Subdistrict (环渚街道), Hudong Subdistrict (湖东街道)

Wuxing District's 5 Towns are as follows:

- Balidian (八里店镇), Zhili (织里镇), Miaoxi (妙西镇), Daixi (埭溪镇), Donglin (东林镇)

Wuxing District's 1 Townships are as follows:

- Daochang Township (道场乡)

== Demographics ==
=== Population ===
According to the 2020 Chinese Census, Wuxing District has a residential population of 712,595, increasing by 140,876 or 24.64% from that of 571,719 in 2010 (Sixth Census). The average annual growth rate was 2.23%.

=== Population by Household Types ===
As of 2020, there were 227,039 family households with 571,291 persons and 34,680 collective households (集体户) with 141,304 persons. The average size of a family household was 2.62 persons, decreasing by 0.51 persons compared with the 3.03 in 2010.

=== Sex Composition ===
Of Wuxing District's residential population in 2020, 365,793 persons or 51.33% were males while 346,802 persons or 48.76% were females. The sex ratio (female=100, male to female) was 105.48, up by 7.08 percent compared with that in 2010.

=== Age Composition ===
According to Seventh Census, there were 74,249 inhabitants (17.95%) in the age group of 0 to 14; 506,949 inhabitants (71.14%) in the age group of 15 to 59; and 131397 inhabitants (18.70%) in the age group of 60 and over. Additionally, there were 95,479 inhabitants (13.50) in the age group of 65 and over. Compared with 2010, the shares of people in the age groups of 0 to 14, 15 to 59, and 60 and above were up by 0.48%, down by 3.95%, and up by 3.47%, respectively. Specially, the part of 65 and over was up by 3.26%.

=== Educational Attainment ===
In 2020, there were 116,132 residents with university education (including foundation degree (大专) and above); 9,7066 residents with senior high school education; 273,645 residents with middle school education; and 176,906 residents with primary school education.

=== Urban and Rural Population ===
In 2020, there were 522,324 urban residents, accounting for 73.3%, and 190,271 rural residents, accounting for 26.7%. Compared with 2010, the urban population has increased by 143,864 and the rural population has decreased by 2,988. The share of urban population went up by 7.10%.

== Transportation ==
=== Rail and high-speed rail ===
- Xuancheng–Hangzhou railway
- Xinyi–Changxing railway
- Nanjing–Hangzhou high-speed railway
- Shanghai–Huzhou high-speed railway, constructing
- Shangqiu–Hangzhou high-speed railway

=== Roads and highways ===
- China National Highway 104
- China National Highway 318

== Tourism ==
- Tomb of Chen Qimei
- Ruins of Qianjiangyang
- Ruins of Xiagu city
- Chaoyin Bridge
