= Huzhou =

Prefecture-level city in Zhejiang, China

Huzhou 湖州市 Huchow
- Prefecture-level city
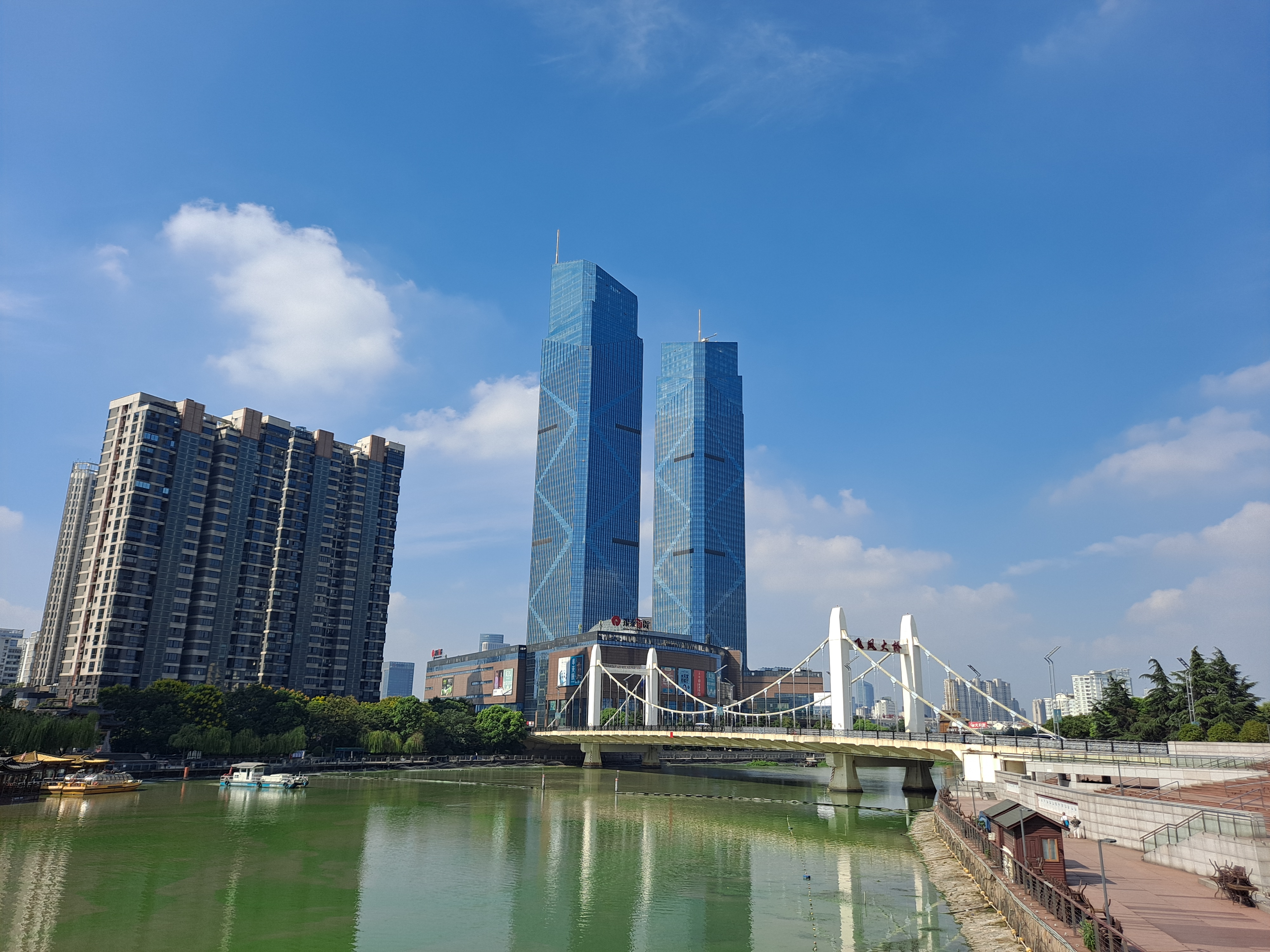
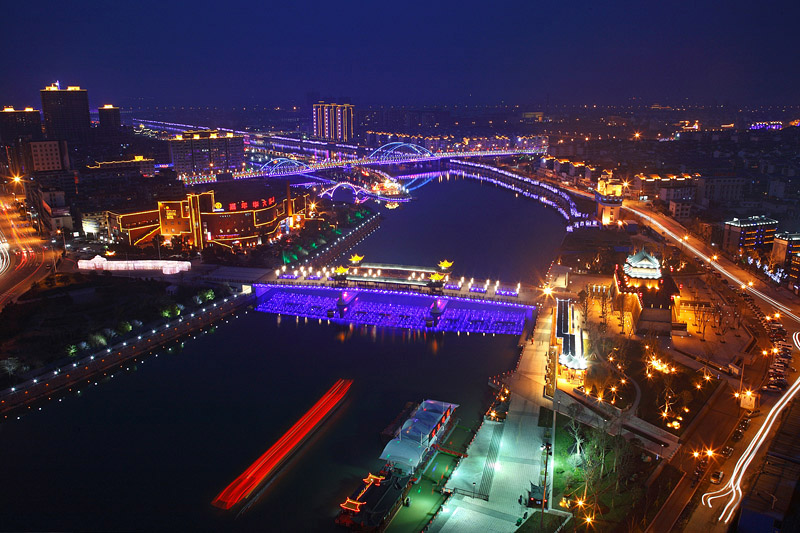
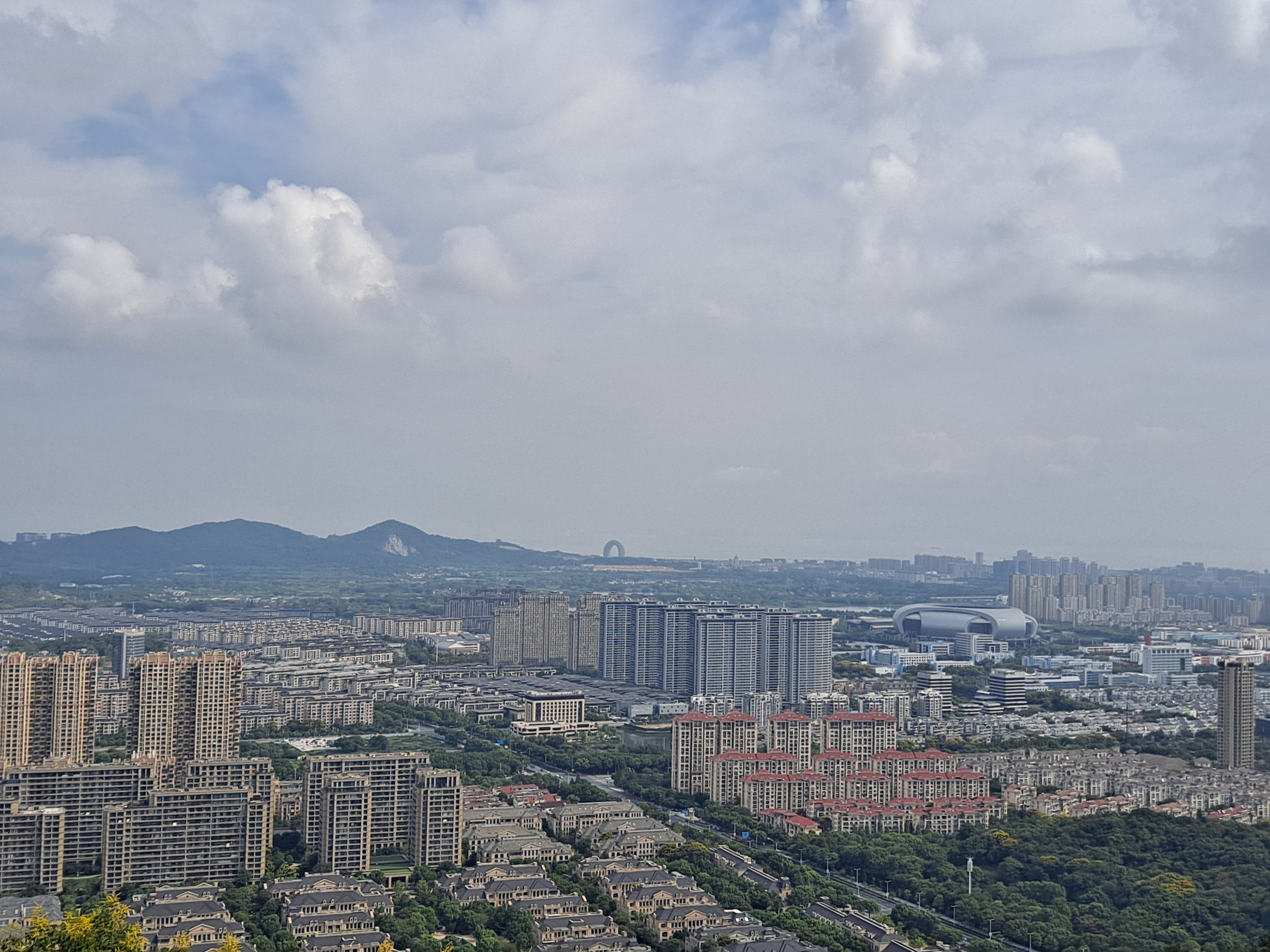
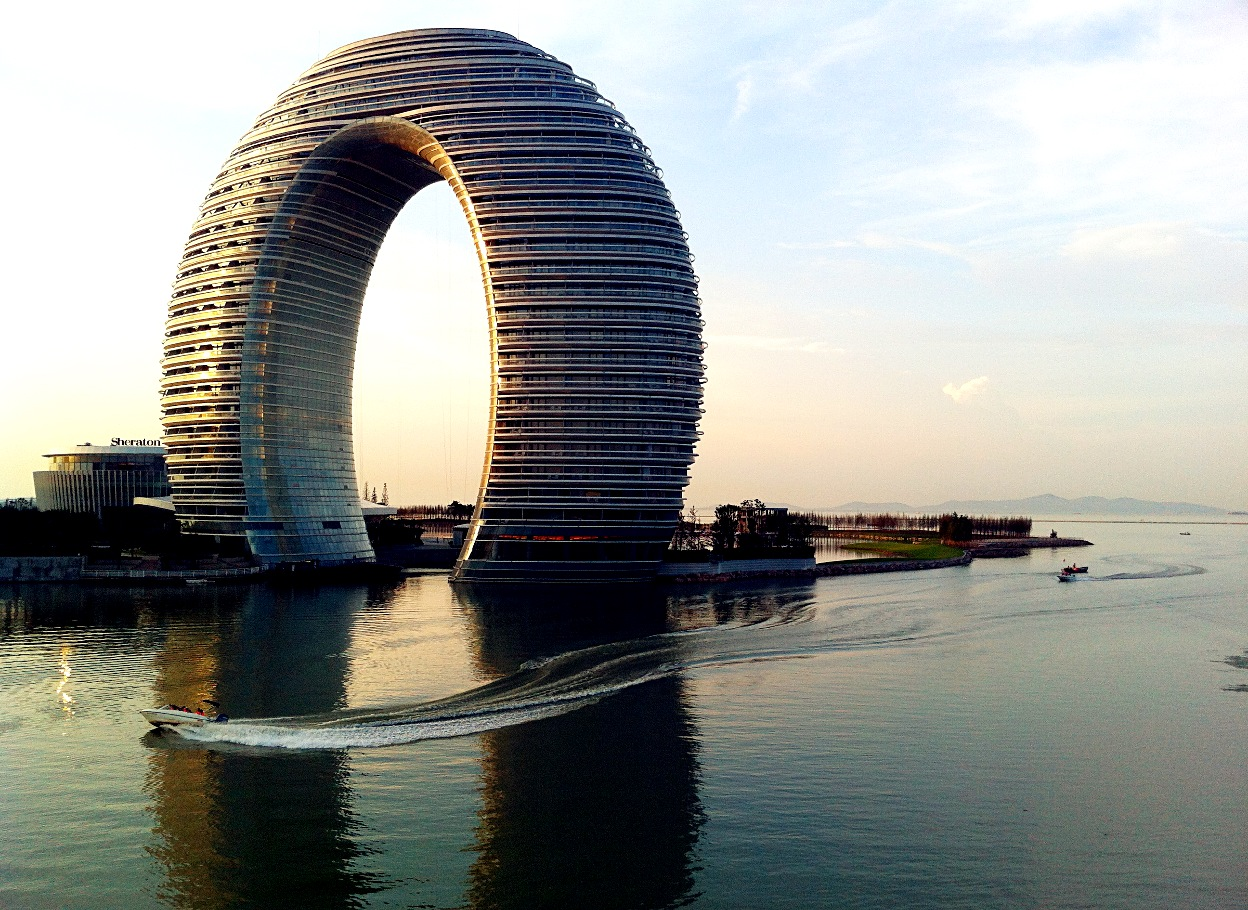
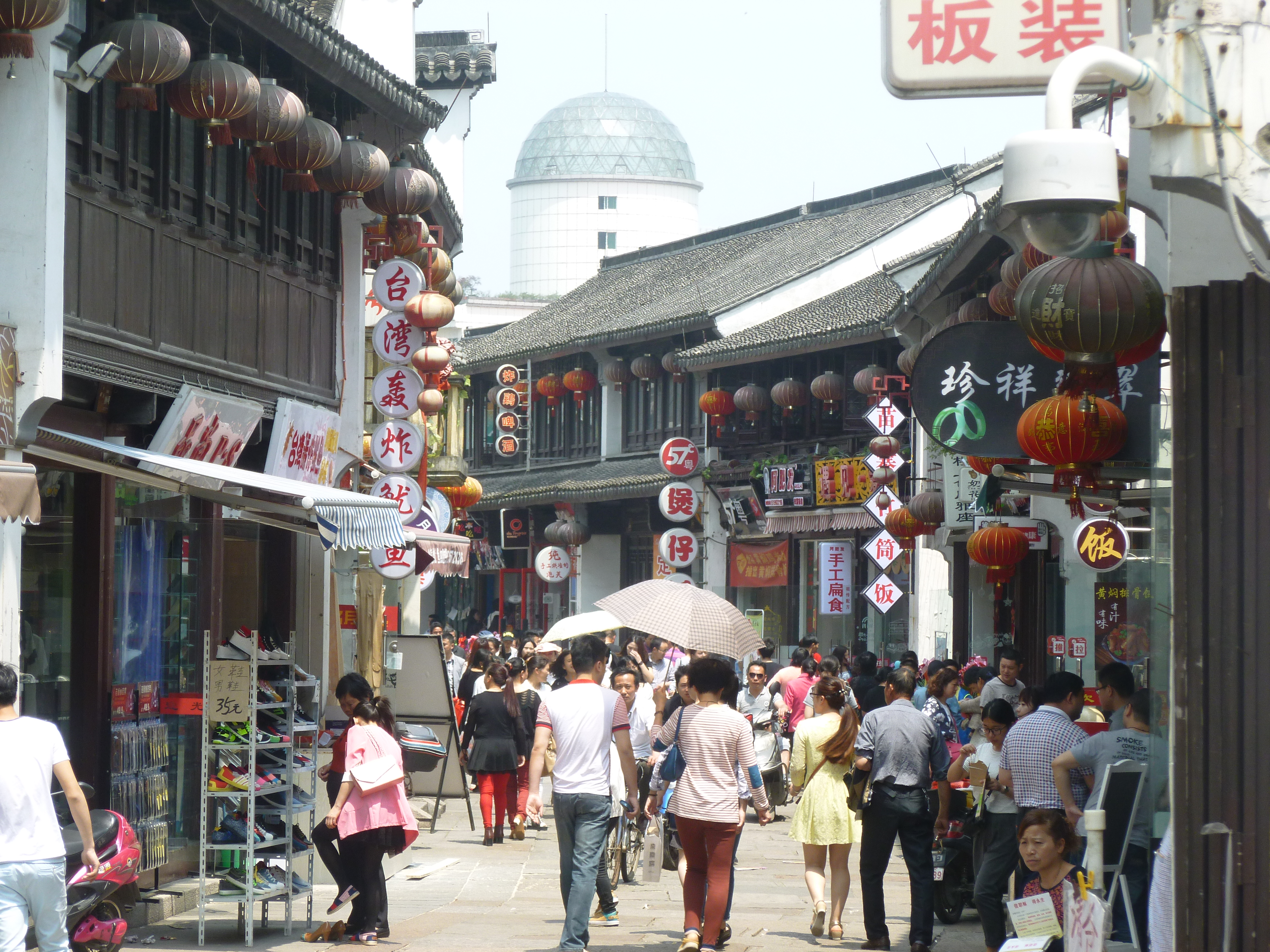
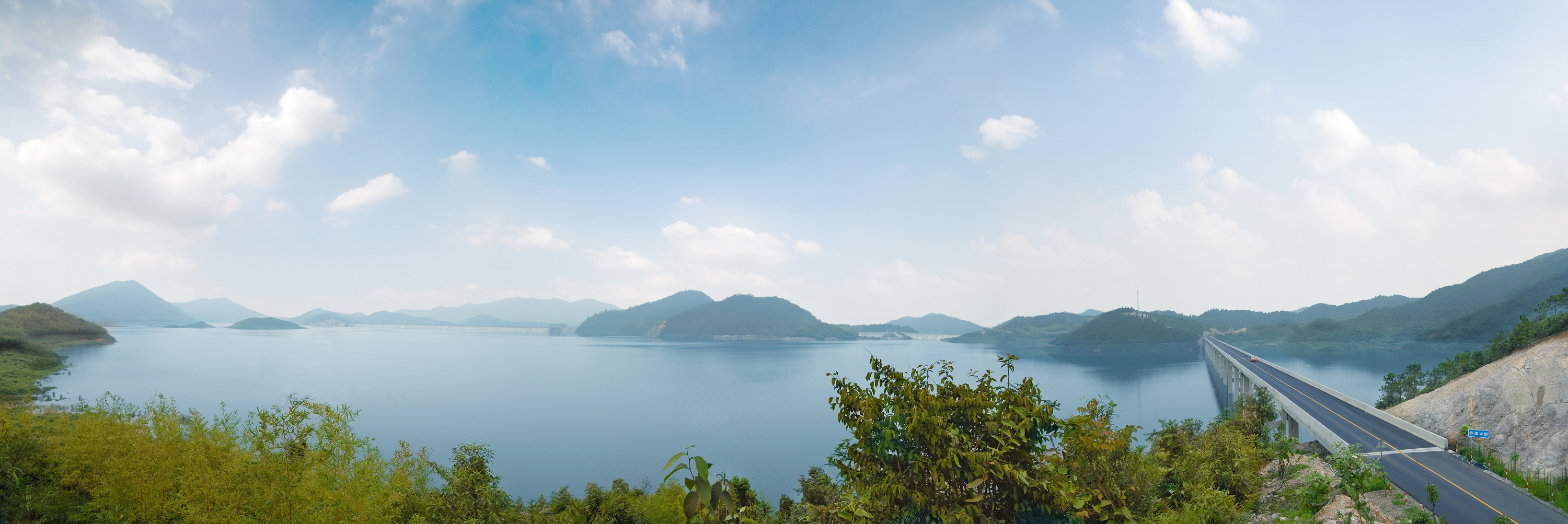
- Left to right, top to bottom: the twin towers of Soochow International Plaza viewed from Xiangwang Park, the Huancheng River at night, skyline seen from Renhuang Mountain with the Huzhou Olympic Stadium visible, the Sheraton Huzhou Hot Spring Resort, Yishang Street, and Laohutan Reservoir south of the city

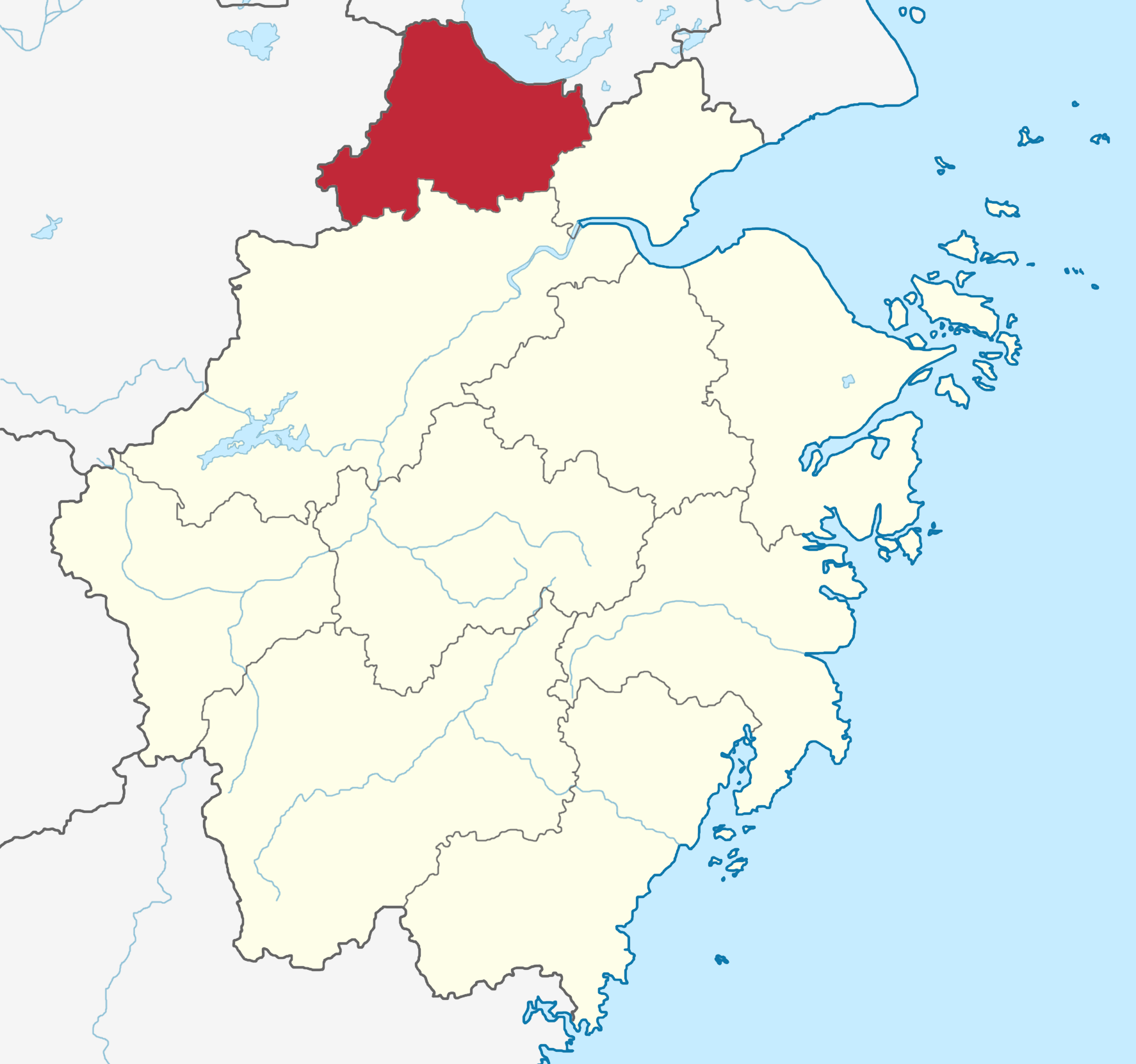
- Location of Huzhou City jurisdiction in Zhejiang
- Interactive map of Huzhou
- Location in China
- Coordinates (Huzhou municipal government): 30°53′33″N 120°05′15″E
- Country: People's Republic of China
- Province: Zhejiang
- County-level divisions: 5
- Township-level divisions: 66
- Municipal seat: Wuxing District

Government
  - CPC Secretary: Ma Xiaohui (马晓辉)
  - Mayor: Qian Sanxiong (钱三雄)

Area
  - Prefecture-level city: 5,818.43 km^{2} (2,246.51 sq mi)
  - Urban: 1,566.8 km^{2} (604.9 sq mi)
  - Metro: 860.42 km^{2} (332.21 sq mi)

Population (2020 census)
  - Prefecture-level city: 3,367,579
  - Density: 578.778/km^{2} (1,499.03/sq mi)
  - Urban: 1,558,826
  - Urban density: 994.91/km^{2} (2,576.8/sq mi)
  - Metro: 1,015,937
  - Metro density: 1,180.7/km^{2} (3,058.1/sq mi)

GDP
  - Prefecture-level city: CN¥ 320 billion US$ 41.1 billion
  - Per capita: CN¥ 95,579; US$ 13,646
- Time zone: UTC+8 (China Standard)
- Area code: 0572
- ISO 3166 code: CN-ZJ-05
- License Plate: 浙E
- Languages: Huzhou dialect
- Website: www.huzhou.gov.cn

Huzhou
- Chinese: 湖州
- Wu: ghou² cieu¹ (Huzhounese) wu⁶ tseu¹ (Shanghainese)
- Literal meaning: Capital of the Lake District
Transcriptions
Standard Mandarin
- Hanyu Pinyin: Húzhōu
- Wade–Giles: Hu-chou
Wu
- Romanization: ghou² cieu¹ (Huzhounese) wu⁶ tseu¹ (Shanghainese)
Yue: Cantonese
- Jyutping: Wu^{4}-zau^{1}
Southern Min
- Hokkien POJ: Ôo-tsiu

Huzhou (Chinese: 湖州; pinyin: Húzhōu,; Huzhou dialect: ghou² cieu¹) is a prefecture-level city in northern Zhejiang province (Hangzhou–Jiaxing–Huzhou Plain, China). Lying south of Lake Tai, it borders Jiaxing to the east, Hangzhou to the south, and the provinces of Anhui and Jiangsu to the west and north respectively.

Huzhou is on the south bank of Taihu Lake, which it is named after. It has a history of more than 2,300 years. It governs Wuxing and Nanxun districts and three counties of Deqing, Changxing and Anji, with a total area of 5,818 square kilometers. As of the 2020 census, its population was 3,367,579 inhabitants, of whom 1,015,937 lived in the built-up (or metro) area made of Wuxing District as Nanxun District was not yet being conurbated.

== Location ==
Huzhou, in its general aspect, is in the center of the Yangtze River Delta Economic Area, with the city center 10 km (6.2 mi) south of the Chinese third largest freshwater lake Lake Tai. The city borders Jiaxing City to the east, Hangzhou City to the south, Xuancheng City, Anhui Province to the west, Taihu Lake to the north, and borders Dajiao Mountain, Changzhou City, Wuxi City, and Suzhou City, Jiangsu Province. There are transportation links to the provincial capital of Hangzhou 78 km (48 mi) away in the south, Jiangsu and Anhui province in the west, and the metropolitan municipality of Shanghai 150 km (93 mi) to the northeast.

Flowing quietly through the city is the Changxing-Huzhou-Shanghai Channel, it is also referred to as the "Eastern Rhine River" for the continuous barge transportation that goes on similarly in the more internationally known Rhine River in Germany.

The State Way 318 passes through Huzhou in an east–west direction and the State Way 104 in a north–south direction; the Nanjing-Huzhou-Hangzhou toll expressway and Shanghai-Jiangsu-Zhejiang-Anhui toll expressway offers convenient access to major areas in the region.

The Express Xuancheng–Hangzhou Railway Station is located 8 km (5.0 mi) west of the city center. This railway line is part of the "secondary tunnel" in eastern China.

== History ==
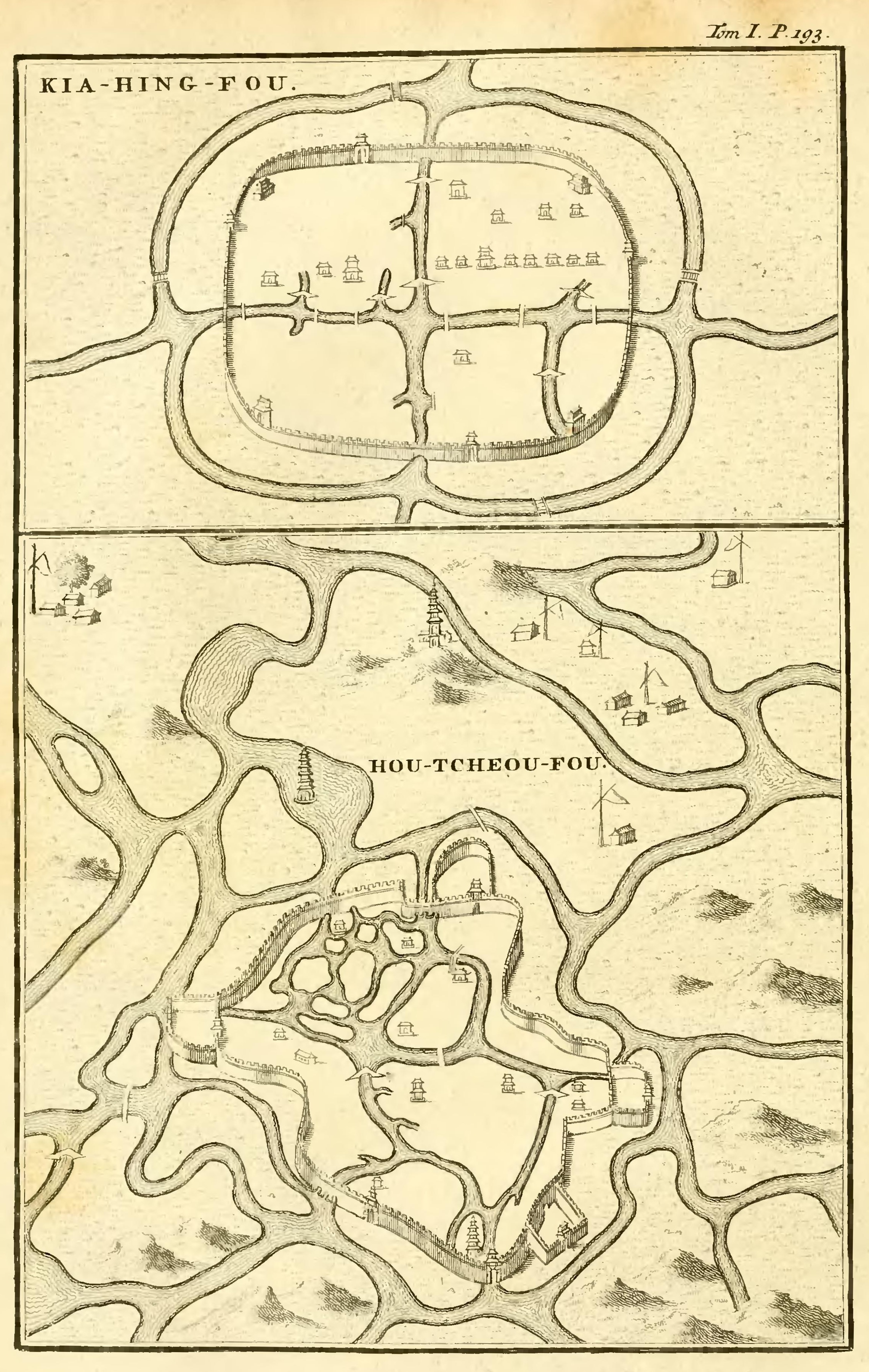
The map of "Kia-hing-fou" and "Hou-tcheou-fou" in Du Halde's 1736 Description of China, based on accounts from Jesuit missionaries

- 248 BC, Gucheng County (菰城縣) was set up by the State of Chu.
- 222 BC, Qin dynasty, Wucheng County (t 烏程縣, s 乌程县, Wūchéngxiàn) was set up.
- 266, Kingdom of Wu, set Wuxing Shire (吳興郡), its administrative area including the modern Huzhou prefecture city and Hangzhou, Yixing in modern-day Jiangsu.
- 602, Sui dynasty, changed the name of Wuxing to Huzhou (湖州).
- During the Tang dynasty, Huzhou administered 5 counties: Wucheng (烏程), Wukang (武康), Changxing, Anji, and Deqing.
- At the beginning of the Song dynasty, Gui'an county (歸安縣) was divided from the Wucheng county.
- During the Qing dynasty, Huzhou administered 7 counties: Wucheng, Guo'an, Wukang, Deqing, Changxing, Anji, and Xiaofeng.
- 1949, with the establishment of the People's Republic of China, Huzhou town became the seat of government of the First Special District of Zhejiang, administrative area including the modern Huzhou and Jiaxing prefecture cities.
- 1983, Huzhou prefecture level city was set up.

== Climate ==
Huzhou has a typical subtropical monsoon climate in Jiangsu South. Summers are hot, winters are mild, and there are four distinct seasons with abundant rainfall. The average annual temperature is 16.3 degrees Celsius and the total annual precipitation is 1303.4 mm. The wind direction in Huzhou changes significantly with each season. The northwest wind prevails in the winter half of the year and the climate is dry and cold. The southeast wind prevails in the summer half of the year and the climate is hot and humid.

Climate data for Huzhou, elevation 7 m (23 ft), (1991–2020 normals, extremes 1969–present)
Month	Jan	Feb	Mar	Apr	May	Jun	Jul	Aug	Sep	Oct	Nov	Dec	Year
Record high °C (°F)	23.0 (73.4)	28.0 (82.4)	32.4 (90.3)	33.5 (92.3)	36.4 (97.5)	37.5 (99.5)	39.2 (102.6)	40.9 (105.6)	37.7 (99.9)	33.4 (92.1)	27.8 (82.0)	24.8 (76.6)	40.9 (105.6)
Mean daily maximum °C (°F)	7.7 (45.9)	10.3 (50.5)	15.0 (59.0)	21.2 (70.2)	26.1 (79.0)	28.7 (83.7)	33.0 (91.4)	32.4 (90.3)	27.9 (82.2)	22.8 (73.0)	17.0 (62.6)	10.5 (50.9)	21.1 (69.9)
Daily mean °C (°F)	4.0 (39.2)	6.2 (43.2)	10.5 (50.9)	16.3 (61.3)	21.5 (70.7)	24.8 (76.6)	28.8 (83.8)	28.3 (82.9)	24.1 (75.4)	18.4 (65.1)	12.4 (54.3)	6.3 (43.3)	16.8 (62.2)
Mean daily minimum °C (°F)	1.2 (34.2)	3.1 (37.6)	6.9 (44.4)	12.3 (54.1)	17.6 (63.7)	21.7 (71.1)	25.5 (77.9)	25.3 (77.5)	21.1 (70.0)	15.0 (59.0)	8.9 (48.0)	3.0 (37.4)	13.5 (56.2)
Record low °C (°F)	−8.0 (17.6)	−11.1 (12.0)	−3.0 (26.6)	2.0 (35.6)	8.6 (47.5)	13.8 (56.8)	18.5 (65.3)	18.9 (66.0)	12.1 (53.8)	4.0 (39.2)	−2.9 (26.8)	−8.5 (16.7)	−11.1 (12.0)
Average precipitation mm (inches)	88.2 (3.47)	79.1 (3.11)	109.7 (4.32)	91.9 (3.62)	115.1 (4.53)	223.9 (8.81)	162.2 (6.39)	169.9 (6.69)	97.4 (3.83)	77.6 (3.06)	65.2 (2.57)	56.0 (2.20)	1,336.2 (52.6)
Average precipitation days (≥ 0.1 mm)	12.1	11.0	13.9	12.5	12.6	15.4	12.9	13.9	10.6	8.2	10.1	8.9	142.1
Average snowy days	3.7	2.4	1.0	0.1	0	0	0	0	0	0	0.3	1.2	8.7
Average relative humidity (%)	77	76	74	72	73	80	78	79	79	78	78	76	77
Mean monthly sunshine hours	110.3	110.5	136.3	159.5	169.1	126.3	202.6	194.5	154.2	158.8	131.7	128.1	1,781.9
Percentage possible sunshine	34	35	36	41	40	30	47	48	42	45	42	41	40
Source: China Meteorological Administration All-time extreme temperature

== Population ==
At the end of 2023, Huzhou City's permanent population will be 3.439 million, with a birth population of 18,000, a death population of 25,000, and a natural population decrease of 7,000.

According to the seventh census data, as of midnight on November 1, 2020, the city's permanent population was 3,367,579.

At the end of 2011, Huzhou had a registered population of 2,611,700, of which 1,31,700 were men and 1,38,800 were women; 851,700 were non-farmers, up 22,700 from the previous year; and 511,200 were over 60. For the whole year, the birth rate was 7.96 per thousand, the death rate was 6.79 per thousand, the natural growth rate was 1.17 per thousand and the family planning rate was 98.08 per cent. The rate of population growth is at or below replacement rate, and the population shrinkage is approximately 7,000 people per year.

According to the sixth national census in 2010, the city's resident population stood at 2,893,542, an increase of 267,753 or 10.20 percent over the fifth national census, with an average annual growth rate of 0.98 percent. Of these, the male population was 1470,472, or 50.82 per cent, and the female population was 1,423,070, or 49.18 per cent. The sex ratio of the total population (100 females) is 103.33. The population aged 0–14 years is 337,688, or 11.67 per cent; the population aged 15–59 years is 2086,891, or 72.12 per cent; and the population aged 60 years and over is 468,963, or 16.21 per cent; of the population aged 65 years and over is 3150,37 or 10.89 per cent. The population living in urban areas is 1530,418, or 52.89 per cent, and the population living in rural areas is 1,363,124, or 47.11 per cent.

== Administration ==
The prefecture-level city of Huzhou administers six county-level divisions, including one economic development zone and two districts and three counties.

These are further divided into 66 township-level divisions, including 50 towns, 10 townships and six subdistricts.

Map
Subdivision	Hanzi	Pinyin	Population (2020)	Area (km^{2})	Density
City Proper
Wuxing District	吴兴区	Wúxīng Qū	1,015,937	871	869.30
Suburban
Nanxun District	南浔区	Nánxún Qū	542,889	716	748.67
Rural
Changxing County	长兴县	Chángxīng Xiàn	673,736	1,388	462.52
Deqing County	德清县	Déqīng Xiàn	548,568	936	525.41
Anji County	安吉县	Ānjí Xiàn	486,409	1,882	247.90

== Economy ==
- Huzhou is known as the City of Silk, is one of the Four Capital-cities of Silk in China.
- Huzhou is one of the 14 key cities in the Yangtze River Delta region, which has been opened to the outside world for development and development. In 2019, Huzhou's gross domestic product (GDP) stood at 312.24 billion yuan, up 7.9% from the previous year at comparable prices, exceeding the province's target of 8% set at the beginning of the year. Of this total, the value-added of primary industries rose 2.8 percent to 13.38 billion yuan, the value-added of secondary industries rose 7.6 percent to 159.54 billion yuan, and the value-added of tertiary industries rose 8.7 percent to 139.32 billion yuan. The value-added structure of tertiary industries was 4.3:51.1:44.6 and the proportion of tertiary industries was 0.8 percentage points higher than the previous year. GDP per capita is 102,593 yuan, or 14,900 dollars.
- Total fiscal revenue was 17.235 billion yuan, of which local revenue was 9.727 billion yuan, up 17.5 percent and 21.6 percent respectively over the previous year. Total fiscal revenue as a share of GDP is 13.2%.

== Military ==
Huzhou is headquarters of the 1st Group Army of the People's Liberation Army, one of the three group armies that comprise the Nanjing Military Region.

== Transportation ==
Huzhou is served by Huzhou railway station, situated to the west of the city. Both conventional and high-speed trains stop at the station.

== International relations ==
=== Twin towns—Sister cities ===
Huzhou is twinned with:

- Radom, Poland
- Kalmar County, Sweden
- Cabo Frio, Rio de Janeiro, Brazil

== Notable people ==
- Zhu Zhi (朱治; 156–224) and Zhu Ran (朱然; 182–248), military general for the Kingdom of Wu during the Three Kingdoms era of China.
- Shen Yue (沈約; 441–513), prominent scholar of the Liang dynasty and author of the Book of Song.
- Chen Baxian (陳霸先; 503–559), founder and Emperor Wu of Chen dynasty during Northern and southern dynasties era.
- Lu Yu (陸羽; 733–804), sage of tea, author of the Classic of Tea.
- Zhao Mengfu (趙孟頫; 1254–1322), great calligrapher and high officer in Yuan dynasty.
- Guan Daogao (1262 - 1319?), calligrapher and author.
- Yu Yue (俞樾; 1821–1906), scholar.
- Shen Jiaben (沈家本; 1840–1913), Late Qing Chinese scholar and jurist.
- Wu Changshuo (吳昌碩; 1844–1927), great calligrapher.
- Chen Qimei (陳其美; 1878–1916), revolutionary, member of Chinese Tongmenghui. Chen Guofu (陳果夫) and Chen Lifu (陳立夫) are nephews of Chen Qimei.
- Lei Zhen (雷震; 1897–1979), politician and political analyst of the Republic of China.
- Dai Jitao (戴季陶; 1891–1949), politician of the Republic of China.
- Zhu Jiahua (朱家驊; 1893–1963), politician of the Republic of China.
- Zhao Jiuzhang (赵九章; 1907–1968), (ancestral roots in Wuxing) meteorologist and physicist.
- Qian Sanqiang (錢三强; 1913–1992), scientist in Chinese atomic bomb study; and his father Qian Xuantong (錢玄同; 1887–1939), scholar.
- Tu Shou'e (屠守鍔; 1917–2012), scientist and rocket designer.
- Yao Yongchen (姚勇忱; 1880–1915), revolutionary and writer.

== See also ==
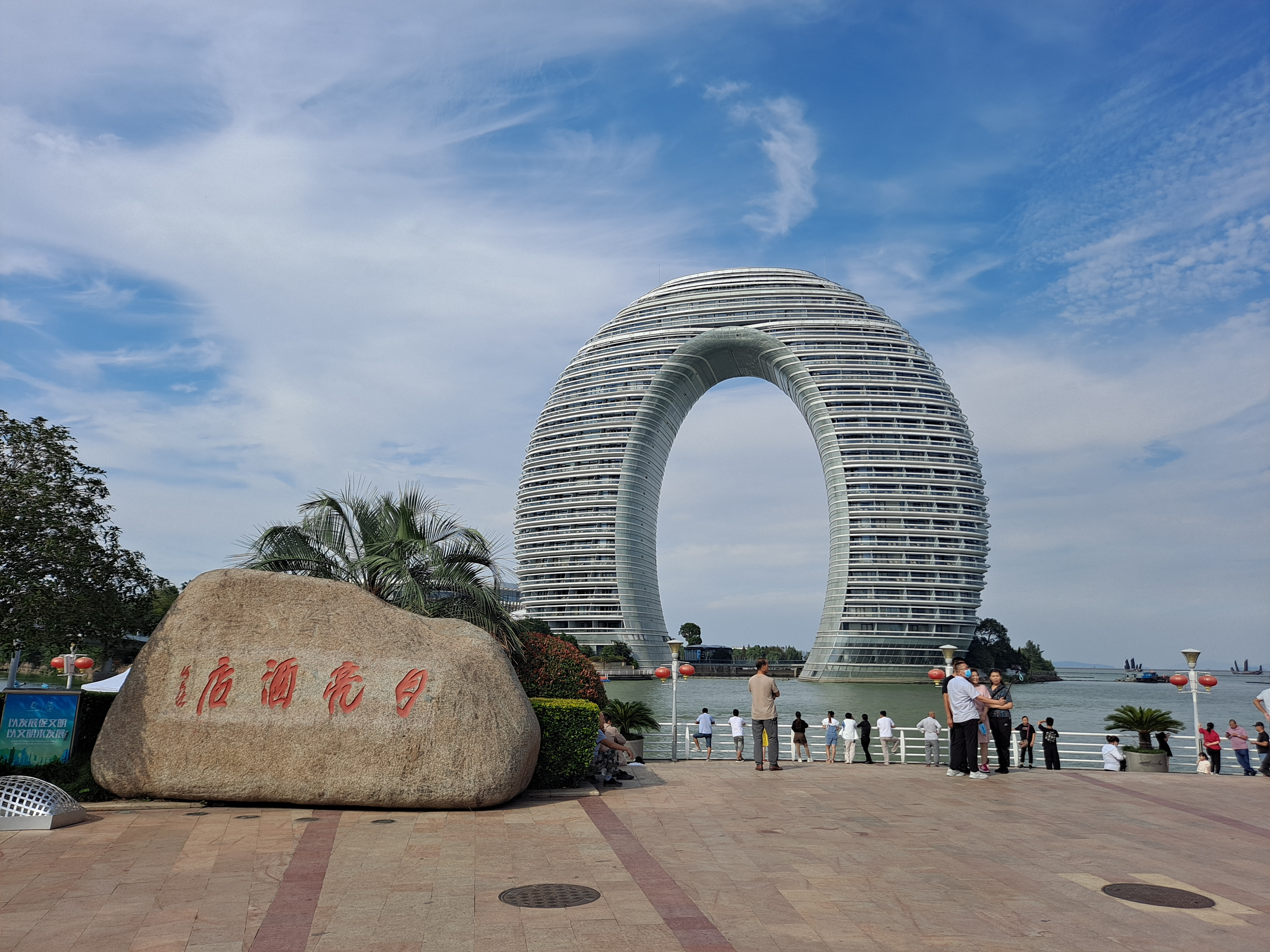
Sheraton Huzhou Hot Spring Resort

- Huzhou ink brush
- Sheraton Huzhou Hot Spring Resort
