= Tapu =

Tapu may refer to:

== Concepts ==
- Tapu (Polynesian culture), a concept of sacredness from which the word "taboo" is derived
- Tapu (Ottoman law), a form of land tenure in the Ottoman Empire, subject to the tapu resmi tax

== Places ==
- Tapu (Bora Bora), a private island in French Polynesia
- Tapu, New Zealand, a settlement on the Coromandel Peninsula, New Zealand
- Țapu, a village in Micăsasa Commune, Sibiu County, Romania

== People and fictional characters ==
- Codrin Țapu, a Romanian author and psychologist
- Tapu Javeri, a Pakistani photographer
- The "guardian deities," a group of Pokémon species introduced in Pokémon Sun and Moon (Tapu Koko, Tapu Lele, Tapu Bulu, Tapu Fini)

== See also ==
- Dapu (disambiguation)
- Ko Tapu or James Bond Island, an island in the Phang Nga Bay, Thailand
- Topu (born 1982), Bangladeshi singer
- Tupu (disambiguation)
