= Gaocheng =

Gaocheng may refer to the following locations in China:

- Gaocheng District (藁城区), a district of Shijiazhuang, Hebei
- Gaocheng Township (高城乡), a township in Xinzhou, Shanxi

== Towns ==
- Gaocheng, Henan (告成), in Dengfeng, Henan
- Gaocheng, Hubei (高城), in Sui County, Hubei
- Gaocheng, Jiangsu (高塍), in Yixing, Jiangsu
- Gaocheng, Jiangxi (高城), in Wanzai County, Jiangxi
- Gaocheng, Shandong (高城), in Gaoqing County, Shandong
- Gaocheng, Sichuan (高城), in Litang County, Sichuan

== See also ==
- Gao Cheng (521–549), regent of Eastern Wei
