= Antičević =

Antičević, sometimes spelled Anticevic is a surname. Notable people with the surname include:

- Neven Antičević (born 1953), Croatian publisher
- Ingrid Antičević-Marinović (born 1957), Croatian politician and lawyer
- Alan Anticevic (born 1981), Croatian neuroscientist
- Zoran Antičević (born 1990), Croatian author
