= Qian Yingying =

Chinese ceramic artist

- 钱盈盈
- Born: Yixing, Jiangsu
- Occupation: ceramic artist
- Known for: The generation inheritor of Hua-style Zisha
- Notable work: Pot of Aladdin and His Wonderful Lamp, Pot of Mortise and tenon, Pot of Rotation, Lu Xun Pot

Qian Yingying (Chinese: 钱盈盈) is a Chinese ceramic artist, who specializes in the Yixing ware (Zisha) skill of “Hua Genre”. Doctor of Philosophy Nanjing University. The Great master of Arts and crafts, Craftsman of Jiangsu province. The generation inheritor of Hua Genera Zisha, The Leader of time-honored brand. The member of Specialized Committee of Young and Middle-Aged Talents of China Arts and Crafts Association

== Life and career ==
Qian Yingying, born in a Zisha family in Yixing, Jiangsu province, has been keeping an affinity with Zisha art since her childhood. She was a student of Zhong Rurong, a Chinese arts and crafts master and Chinese ceramic master. Works with a variety of shapes created by Qian Yingying have won international and domestic awards.

== Award-winning works ==
Pot of Aladdin and His Wonderful Lamp: Gold Award of 2014 China Arts and Crafts Creation Award

Pot of New Energy: the Bronze Award of 2015 “Baihua Cup” Chinese Arts and Crafts Boutique Award

Cai Lian He Tian Tian Hu: the Silver Award of 2016 “Baihua Cup” Chinese Arts and Crafts Boutique Award

Monkey Cup: the Gold Award of 2016 “Shenzhen • Golden Phoenix” Crafts Design & Innovation Award

Pot of Mortise and tenon: the Gold Award of 2018 “Shenzhen • Golden Phoenix” Crafts Design & Innovation Award

Pot of Rotation: the Gold Award of 2018 “Shenzhen • Golden Phoenix” Crafts Design & Innovation Award

== Achievements ==
2014, Smooth Sailing collected by China Maritime Museum, Shanghai

2014, Pot of Aladdin and His Wonderful Lamp and Lotus Pot collected by British Victoria and Albert Museum

2015, Hua Genre Zisha Art Boutique Exhibition held in Beijing

2018, outstanding graduate granted by Nanjing University of the Arts

2018, the master of arts and crafts of Nanjing granted by Nanjing Municipal
