= Dapu =

Dapu may refer to:

== China ==
- Dapu, Hengdong (大浦镇), a town of Hengdong County, Hunan.
- Dapu, Liucheng County (Chinese: 大埔镇), town in Guangxi Province
- Dapu, Yixing (Chinese: 大浦镇), town in Yixing city, Jiangsu Province
- Dapu, Yongchun County (Chinese: 达埔镇), town in Fujian Province
- Dabu County (Chinese: 大埔县), county of Meizhou City, Guangdong Province

== Taiwan ==
- Dapu, Chiayi (Chinese: 大埔鄉), township in Chiayi County, Taiwan

== Other ==
- Dapu incident (2010), an eminent domain case in Zhunan, Miaoli, Taiwan
- Dapu (Chinese: 打譜; pinyin: Dǎpǔ), the process of transcribing old Guqin (musical instrument) tablature notation into a playable form
