= Jiang Fengzhi =

- Born: 1908; Yixing, Jiangsu Province, China
- Died: 1986 (aged 77–78)
- Occupation: Musician
- Instrument: Erhu

Jiang Fengzhi (蒋风之, 1908–1986) was an erhu artist from Yixing, Jiangsu Province, China. His career of playing the erhu can be divided into four periods. In the first period, he was educated by Wang Laosi (simplified Chinese: 王老四) from 1920 to 1921. The second is learning from Chu Shizhu (simplified Chinese: 储师竹, also a Chinese erhu artist). The third, he asked Wu Bochao for help later in 1927 after school. The fourth, he became a student of Liu Tianhua (simplified Chinese: 刘天华, a national musical instrument composer) officially from 1929 to 1932. And his concept is ,hat: for study, the first is working andard, the second is being creative.

== Career ==
In 1928, he was admitted to Shanghai National Music Academy. The following year, he was disenrolled by the school for sending a petition twice to Government of the Republic in Shanghai natifor the onal music of student protests. For this reason, Jiang transferred to Peking University Institute of the Arts Department of music. He was taught to play the erhu by Liu Tianhua, who was a famous master of Chinese music. From 1932 to the late 1940s, Jiang Fengzhi held solo concerts in Japan, Qingdao and Beijing, playing the ten famous musical compositions by Liu Tianhua. In 1932, Jiang graduated and served successively as lecturer, associate professor and professor in Peking women's College of Arts and Sciences, Beijing women's normal school, Beijing Normal University, National Perking College of Arts. From 1948 to 1957, he was professor and head of department in Hebei Normal University. In November 1957, he went to teach at Beijing Normal University. In 1977, he returned to China Institute of Music and was promoted as associate president.

== Main music works ==
Jiang's most famous performance is the erhu solo Han Palace, Autumn Moon (Hangongqiuyue 汉宫秋月) published in 1950. This creative work is a masterpiece of Erhu composition. It originated from Yingzhou gudiao and it is the first part of Lute music Han Palace, Autumn Moon. At the very beginning, folk musician Liu Tianhua recomposed it as an Erhu composition based on Yuehu tune, and taught it to his students around the year 1929. Afterwards, many musicians developed it when they taught students and gave instrumental performances. Among them, Jiang was the most accomplished musician. He had done so much research about Han Palace, Autumn Moon that his performance successfully expressed the emotions of Diao Chan. His research was particularly meticulous and can describe his performance by this Chinese idiom. In the year, his another work Beautiful Night (liangxiao良宵) came to the public.

The composition of Han Palace, Autumn Moon reflects the sadness of maids who were obliged to go into Han Palace. In a lonely, silent night, the moonlight covered the palace which was a prison to the maids. The maids poured their depression and resentment.

Besides this well-known masterpiece, he also wrote many other musical compositions, such as Back From the South (Nangui), the Long Night (Changye) and so on. There is a story about the Long Night. After the Incident of January 28, 1932, Chinese people were angry about Janpese troop and the Nationalist Party. Facing the dark society, Jiang created the composition—the Long Night (Changye). The Long Night can be divided into three parts. The first part describes wandering in the darkness. The second is about longing for the light. The last is running towards a new future.

== Other music works ==
- Illness Bard (Bingzhongyin 病中吟)
- River Water (Jiangheshui 江河水)
- Birds Singing in the Deserted Mount (Kongshanniaoyu 空山鸟语)
- Ornamented Happy Song (Huhuanle 花欢乐)
- Sweety in Bitter (Kuzhongle 苦中乐)
- Singing in Idle House (Xianjuyin 闲居吟)
- Treasures Of Chinese Instrumental Music, Erhu

Illness Bard, which was also composed by Liu Tianhua, reflects a kind of emotion of intellects. In the 1920s, there were a part of intellects that held the feeling of disaffection. They pursued the light, tried to change current situation, although sometimes they felt confuse about the future of this land. When Jiang performed this solo, he made an apparent contrast among the four parts in tempo and dynamics. And it perfectly expresses the intellects’ emotions.

== Writings ==
- the Art of Erhu Performance of Jiang Fengzhi(蒋风之二胡演奏艺术)
- Jiang Fengzhi: Eight Pieces for Erhu(蒋风之二胡曲八首)

== Influences ==
Jiang reformed the traditional erhu and changed its shape in pursuit of better playing affections. In the education field, he contributed his time to musical education for over 50 years and many of his students became famous all over the world. One of his students Xiang Zuying (simplified Chinese: 项祖英) is extremely outstanding and pushed the art of the erhu even further. His four children all become wonderful erhu artist and have their own style. His family is considered as the art of erhu family.

Jiang's deep performance has affected many music lovers for more than fifty years. Jiang was the founder of "Jiang Style" and guided and supported lots of younger musicians in China. During his whole life, Mr. Jiang held a serious attitude towards art, kept working hard and strong-minded in the pursuit of knowledge, and, last but not least, dedicated himself to Chinese music.
