= Alan Anticevic =

Croatian neuroscientist

- Education: Washington University in St. Louis
- Scientific career
- Fields: Neuroscience, Psychiatric illness
- Workplaces: Yale School of Medicine

Alan Anticevic is a Croatian neuroscientist known for his contributions to the fields of cognitive neuroscience, computational psychiatry, and neuroimaging studies of severe psychiatric illnesses.

He was the first individual in the field of psychiatry and the first Yale faculty to be awarded the NIH Director's Early Independence award in 2012. His work is focused on developing clinical and pharmacological neuroimaging biomarkers that inform neural mechanisms leading to neuropsychiatric disorders.

== Early life and education ==
Alan Anticevic earned his Bachelor's degree in Psychology and Neuroscience from Drake University in 2004. Following his undergraduate studies, he obtained a Master's degree in Clinical Psychology in 2007. Anticevic completed his Ph.D. at Washington University in St. Louis, in 2011, where he trained in Clinical Psychology and Cognitive Neuroscience. Later, Anticevic pursued post-doctoral training in Clinical Neuropsychology at Yale University.

== Career ==
Alan Anticevic was appointed an associate research scientist from 2011 to 2013 at Yale University School of Medicine and during this period he served as the Administrative Director for the Center for Translational Neuroscience of Alcoholism (CTNA). In 2013, he was appointed Assistant Professor at Yale University. He was the Glenn H. Greenberg Associate Professor of Psychiatry and Psychology at the Yale School of Medicine, where he directed the division for Neurocognition, Neurocomputation and Neurogenetics (N3) at the Department of Psychiatry.

Anticevic's early work applied clinical neuroimaging to understand biomarkers of cognitive and affective processes in people suffering from schizophrenia. Anticevic focused on developing neuroimaging measures for a cognitive process called working memory, which refers to the ability to hold information in mind over time, which is affected in schizophrenia. Anticevic's research team applied biophysical computational modeling approaches to understand the neural circuit mechanism that supports working memory in humans. He applied pharmacological neuroimaging to test neural and behavioral predictions of computational models that simulate circuit activity underpinning spatial working memory. Building on this work, his team has pioneered translational fMRI biomarkers that may map to mechanisms which are now employed in clinical trials.

Anticevic and his team have also been conducting research into development of cross-diagnostic biomarkers that capitalize on large clinical neuroimaging datasets and statistical learning methods. His team leveraged the power of functional neuroimaging to map the relationship between how mental health symptoms vary in relation to fMRI signals in the absence of a cognitive task or external stimuli - the so-called resting-state fMRI. This allows for identification of brain areas whose pattern of communication with other brain areas may reveal links to psychiatric symptoms. His team found that traditional ways of measuring symptoms of psychosis, such as averaging across many items on a questionnaire, does not produce reliable brain biomarkers even when evaluating hundreds of patients. Instead they found that using statistical learning methods can help quantify a substantially more precise and reliable mapping between symptoms and brain signals, which can lead to superior understanding of disease mechanisms as well as potential therapeutic drug targets.

Anticevic has also advanced approaches to map effects of neuropharmacology on the human brain, in an effort to understand the underlying mechanism of action in humans as well as advance methods for drug discovery. Specifically, his team has studied neural acute effects of ketamine in healthy volunteers using rating scale-based behavioural and resting-state fMRI-based neural measures. His work provided strong evidence of inter-individual variability in responses to ketamine along with associations to relevant gene expression markers (somatostatin, parvalbumin) in the brain. His work has also established that acute administration of LSD in healthy volunteers induces patterns of resting-state fMRI-based functional connectivity that implicate the 5-HT_{2A} receptor in LSD's neuropharmacology.

Alan Anticevic left Yale University in 2024 to become the CEO of Manifest Technologies, Inc., a company he co-founded based on research conducted at Yale. He was previously recognized with the 2022 Yale Faculty Innovation Award and the Blavatnik Award for Innovation for the commercial application of his research. At Manifest Technologies, he and his team developed the NAIO™ (Neuroscience and Artificial Intelligence Optimized) platform, designed to automate the integration, processing, and analysis of complex multi-modal clinical and pharmacological neuroimaging data. In 2024, Anticevic led the company to a successful acquisition of Manifest Technologies, Inc. and the NAIO platform. He and his team continue to advance the platform to support pharmaceutical research and development in central nervous system (CNS) disorders, with the aim of promoting precision medicine neuroimaging solutions in clinical neuroscience.

== Research ==
Anticevic's research investigates various aspects related to development of biomarkers for severe neuropsychiatric disorders such as schizophrenia, bipolar disorder, and substance abuse. His research has focused on the cognitive neuroscience of psychiatric illness, functional connectivity, and functional neuroimaging analysis methodology, all in the service of developing tools to advance therapies for neuropsychiatric disorders. One particular area of interest is in the brain circuits involved in cognitive operations, such as working memory, and understanding their interaction with neural systems involved in affective processes. Methodologically, Anticevic employs a combination of task-based and resting-state functional neuroimaging, pharmacological functional neuroimaging, and computational modeling approaches to mechanistically understand neural circuit mechanism in psychiatric disorders. Anticevic and his collaborators have also advanced a number of tools and methods for human neuroimaging, such as techniques for relating human neural gene expression patterns to neuroimaging measures. In addition, his team has developed methods for testing the effects of pharmacology on human brain signals using substances such as ketamine and LSD and psilocybin.

== Awards and honors ==
In 2012, Anticevic received the NIH Director's Early Independence Award as well as the NARSAD Young Investigator Award. In 2014, he was recognized by the International Congress of Schizophrenia Research with the Young Investigator Award. He also received the American Psychological Society Janet Taylor Spence Award for Transformative Early Career Contribution in 2014. In 2015, he was awarded the NARSAD Independent Investigator Award and was named recipient of the Gerald R. Klerman Prize for Exceptional Research by a NARSAD Young Investigator.

In 2016, Anticevic received the Rising Star Award from the Schizophrenia International Research Society (SIRS) and the A.E. Bennett Research Award from the Society of Biological Psychiatry. In 2019, he was honored by the American College of Neuropsychopharmacology with the Joel Elkes Research Award. In 2020, his contributions to teaching and mentorship were recognized with the Yale Department of Psychiatry Chairman's Award.

In 2022, Anticevic received the Yale Ventures Faculty Innovation Award as well as the Blavatnik Award for commercial applications of his research.

== Selected publications ==
=== Books ===
- Computational Psychiatry: Mathematical Modeling of Mental Illness. Elsevier. 2018. ISBN 978-0-12-809825-7.

=== Articles ===
- Anticevic, Alan; W. Cole, Michael (2012). "The role of default network deactivation in cognition and disease". Trends in Cognitive Sciences. 16 (12): 584–592. doi:10.1016/j.tics.2012.10.008. PMC 3501603. PMID 23142417.
- Anticevic, Alan; Repovs, Grega (2014). "Characterizing Thalamo-Cortical Disturbances in Schizophrenia and Bipolar Illness". Cerebral Cortex. 24 (12). Oxford University Press: 3116–3130. doi:10.1093/cercor/bht165. PMC 4224238. PMID 23825317.
- Anticevic, Alan; Gancsos, Mark; D. Murray, John (2012-09-25). E. Raichle, Marcus (ed.). "NMDA receptor function in large-scale anticorrelated neural systems with implications for cognition and schizophrenia". PNAS. 109 (41): 16720–16725. Bibcode:2012PNAS..10916720A. doi:10.1073/pnas.1208494109. PMC 3478611. PMID 23012427.
- Ji, Jie Lisa; Spronk, Marjolein; Kulkarni, Kaustubh; Repovš, Grega; Anticevic, Alan; Cole, Michael W. (2019-01-15). "Mapping the human brain's cortical-subcortical functional network organization". NeuroImage. 185: 35–57. doi:10.1016/j.neuroimage.2018.10.006. ISSN 1053-8119. PMC 6289683. PMID 30291974.
- Yang, Genevieve J.; Murray, John D.; Repovs, Grega; Cole, Michael W.; Savic, Aleksandar; Glasser, Matthew F.; Pittenger, Christopher; Krystal, John H.; Wang, Xiao-Jing; Pearlson, Godfrey D.; Glahn, David C.; Anticevic, Alan (2014-05-20). "Altered global brain signal in schizophrenia". Proceedings of the National Academy of Sciences. 111 (20): 7438–7443. Bibcode:2014PNAS..111.7438Y. doi:10.1073/pnas.1405289111. ISSN 0027-8424. PMC 4034208. PMID 24799682.

=== Published Patents ===
- US 20240062847A1, D. Murray, John; Anticevic, Alan & J. Martin, William, "Methods and systems for computer-generated predictive application of neuroimaging and gene expression mapping data"
- US 20210005306A1, Anticevic, Alan; Murray, John & Lisa JI, Jie, "Systems and Methods for Neuro-Behavioral Relationships in Dimensional Geometric Embedding (N-Bridge)"
