= Dongcang Bridge =

Dongcang Bridge 东仓桥
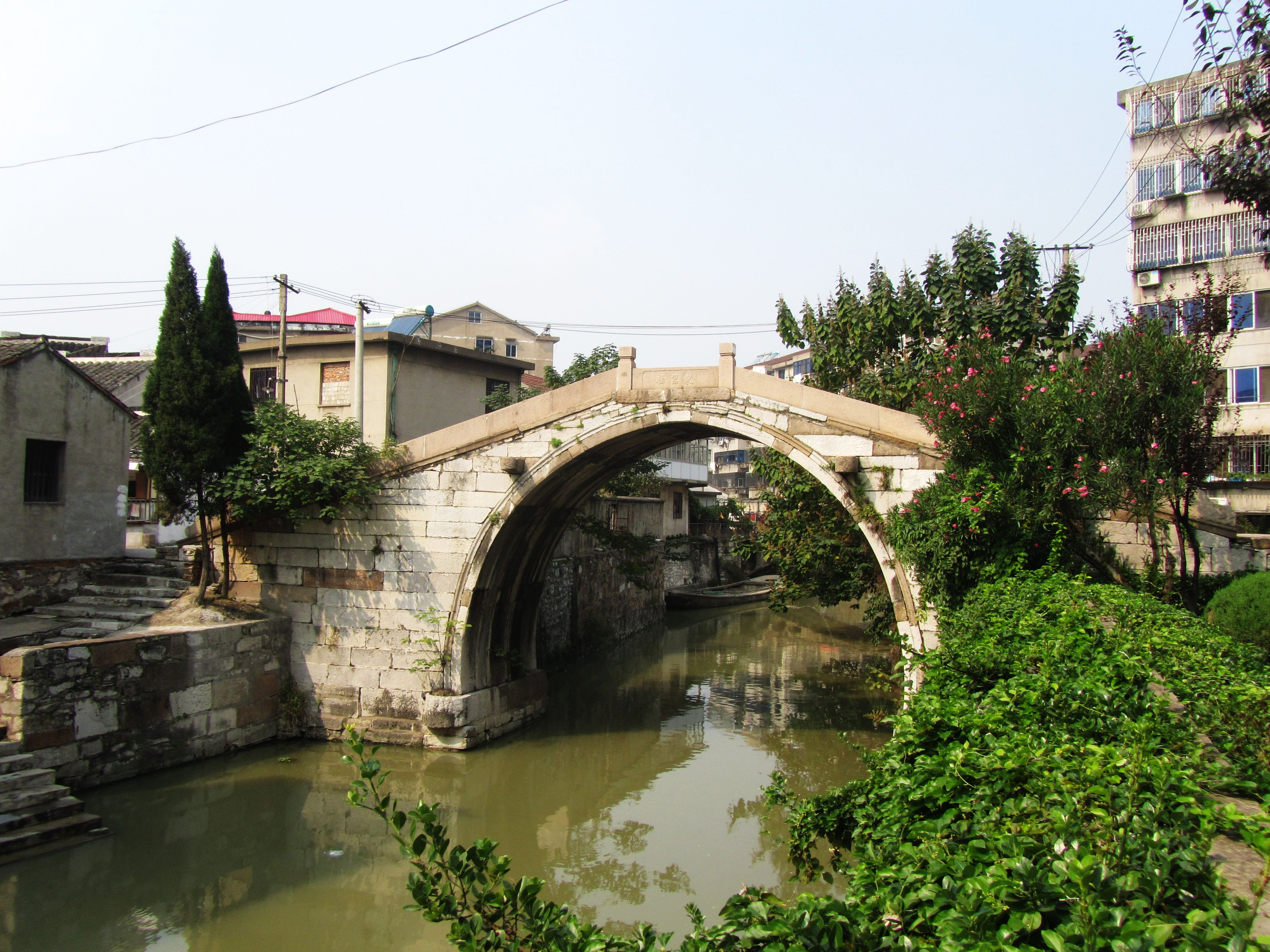
- Dongcang Bridge in October 2013
- Coordinates: 31°21′56″N 119°49′25″E
- Carries: Pedestrians
- Crosses: Dongcang River
- Locale: Yicheng Subdistrict, Yixing, Jiangsu, China

Characteristics
- Design: Arch bridge
- Material: Stone
- Total length: 30 metres (98 ft)
- Width: 4.7 metres (15 ft)
- Height: 5.5 metres (18 ft)

History
- Construction end: 1227
- Rebuilt: 1997

The Dongcang Bridge (simplified Chinese: 东仓桥; traditional Chinese: 東倉橋; pinyin: Dōngcāng Qiáo) is a historic stone arch bridge over the Dongcang River in Yicheng Subdistrict, Yixing, Jiangsu, China. The bridge measures 30 metres (98 ft) long, 4.7 metres (15 ft) wide, and approximately 5.5 metres (18 ft) high.

== History ==
Dongcang Bridge was originally built in the Baoqing period (1225–1227) during the reign of Emperor Lizong in the Southern Song dynasty by magistrate Zhao Rumai (赵汝迈), but because of war and natural disasters has been rebuilt numerous times since then. The present version was completed in March 1997. In June 2006, it was inscribed as a provincial-level cultural heritage site by the Government of Jiangsu.

== Gallery ==
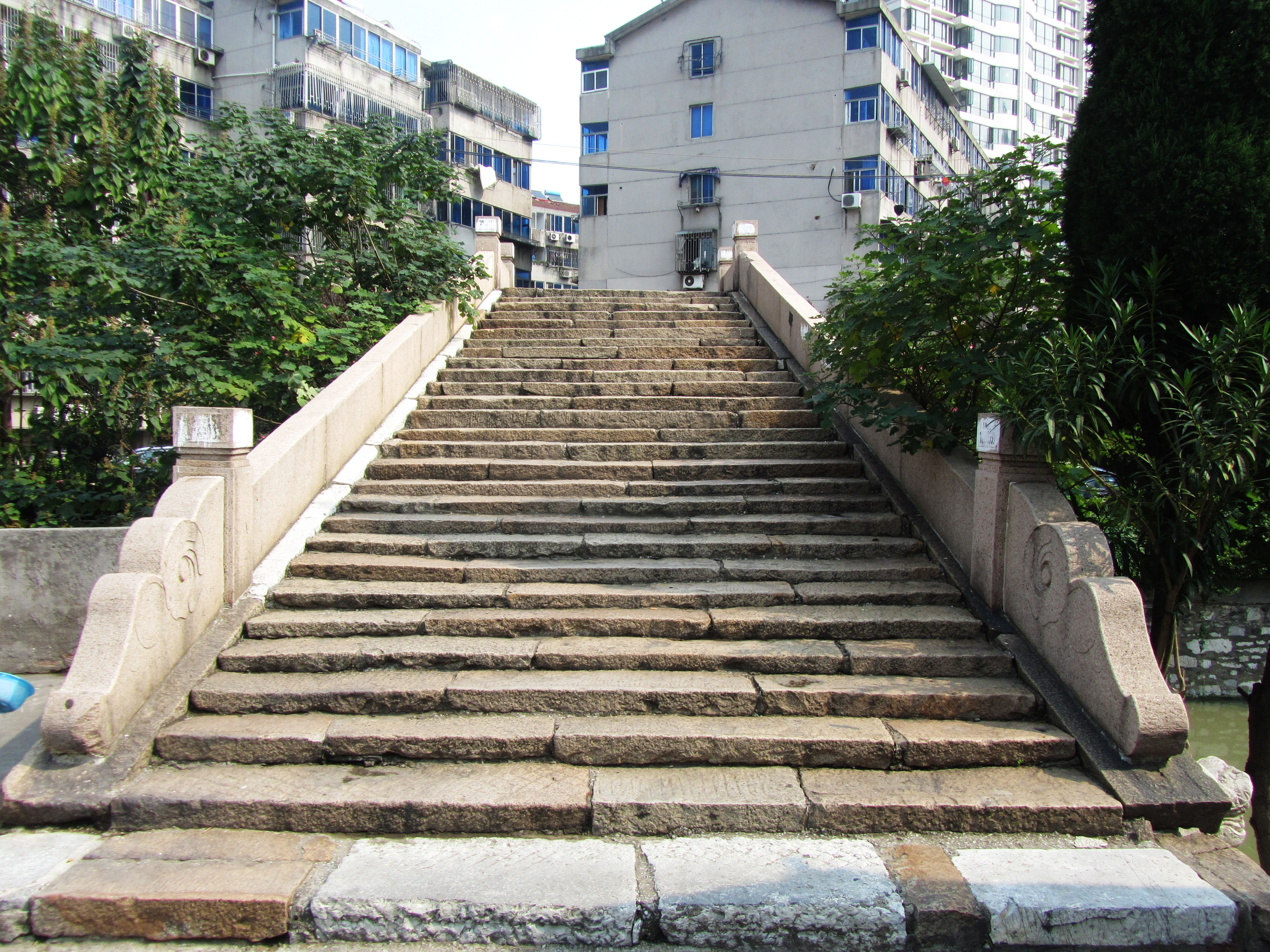
Dongcang Bridge in October 2013

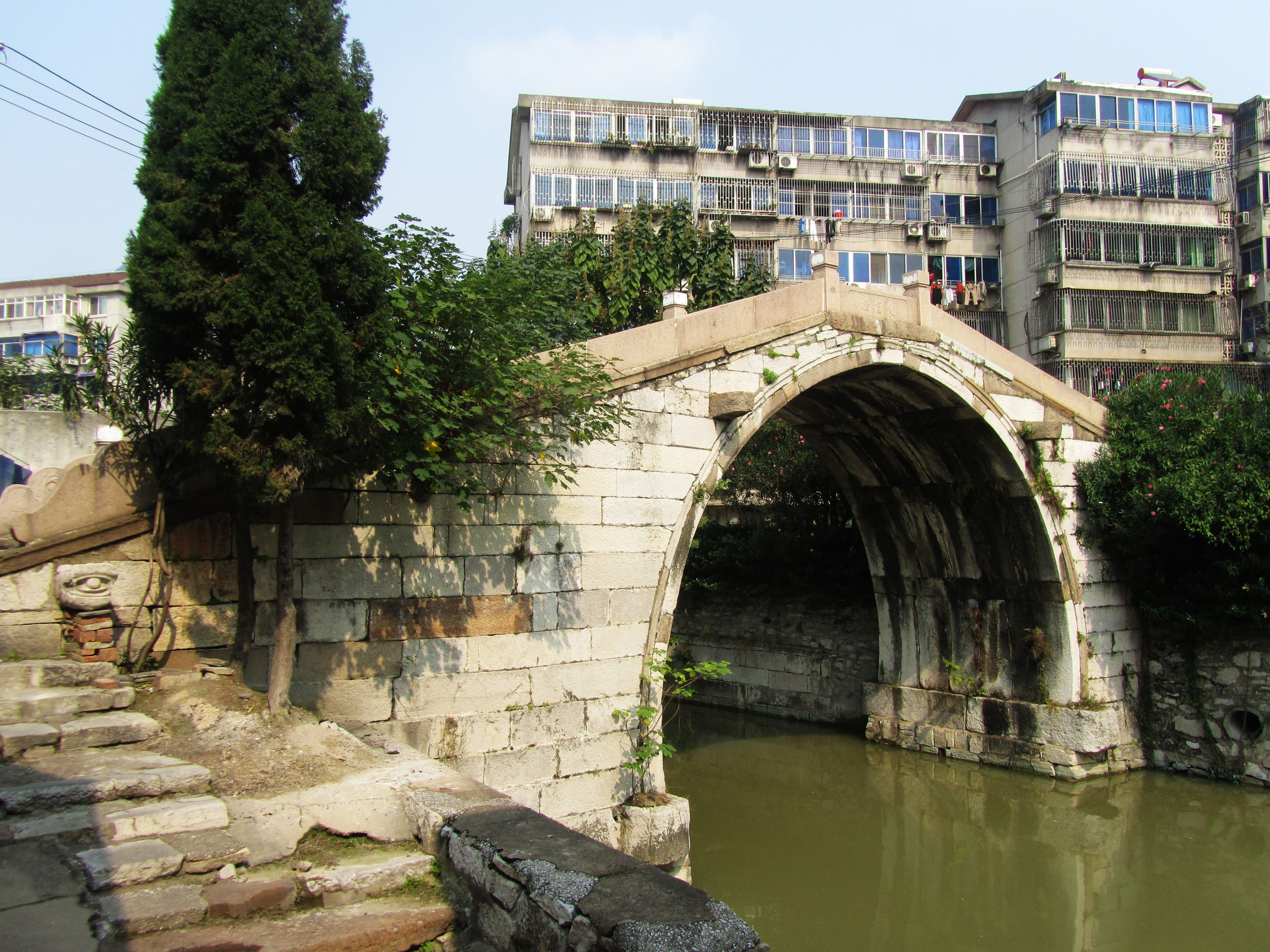
Dongcang Bridge in October 2013

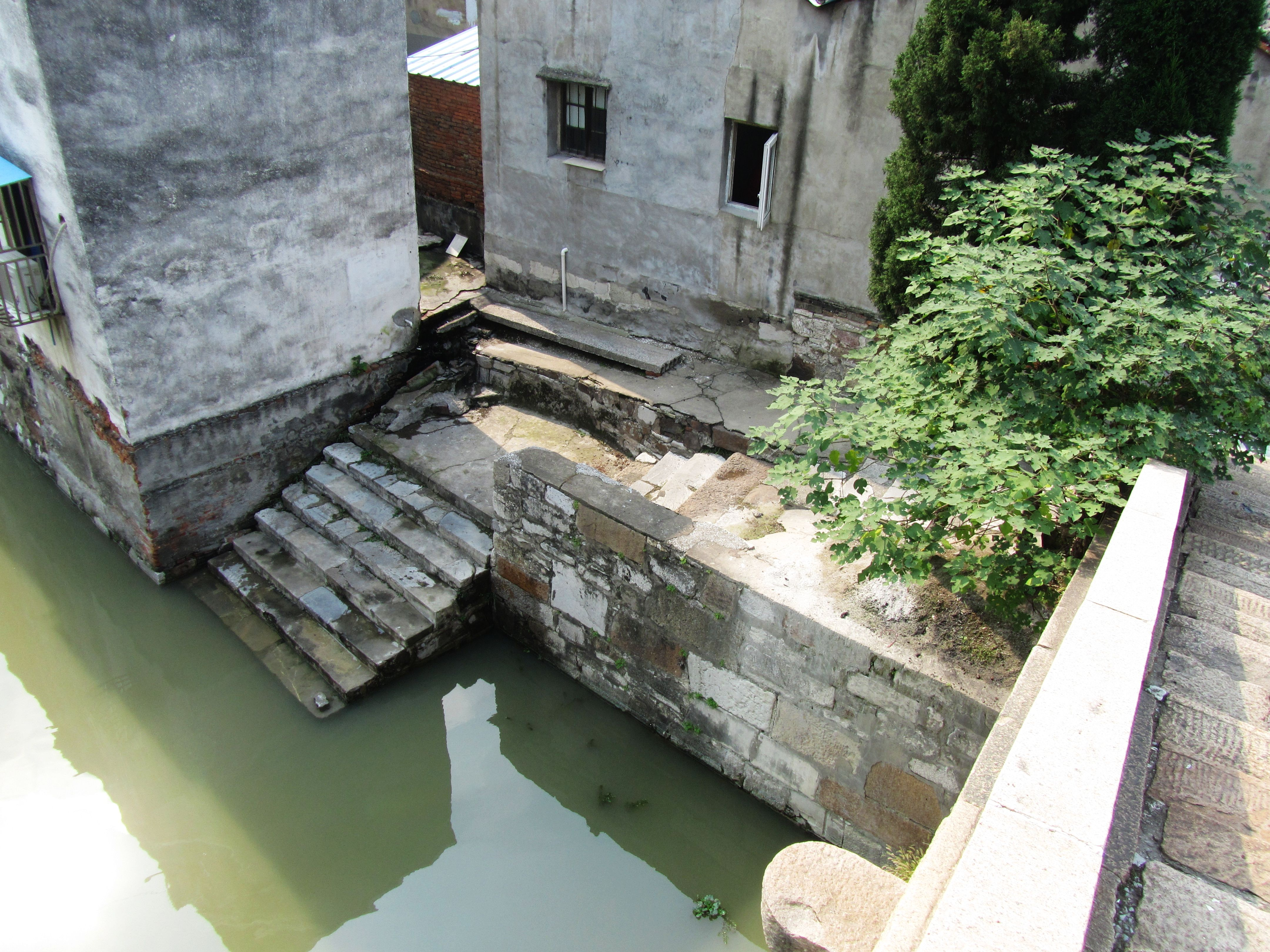
Dongcang Bridge in October 2013

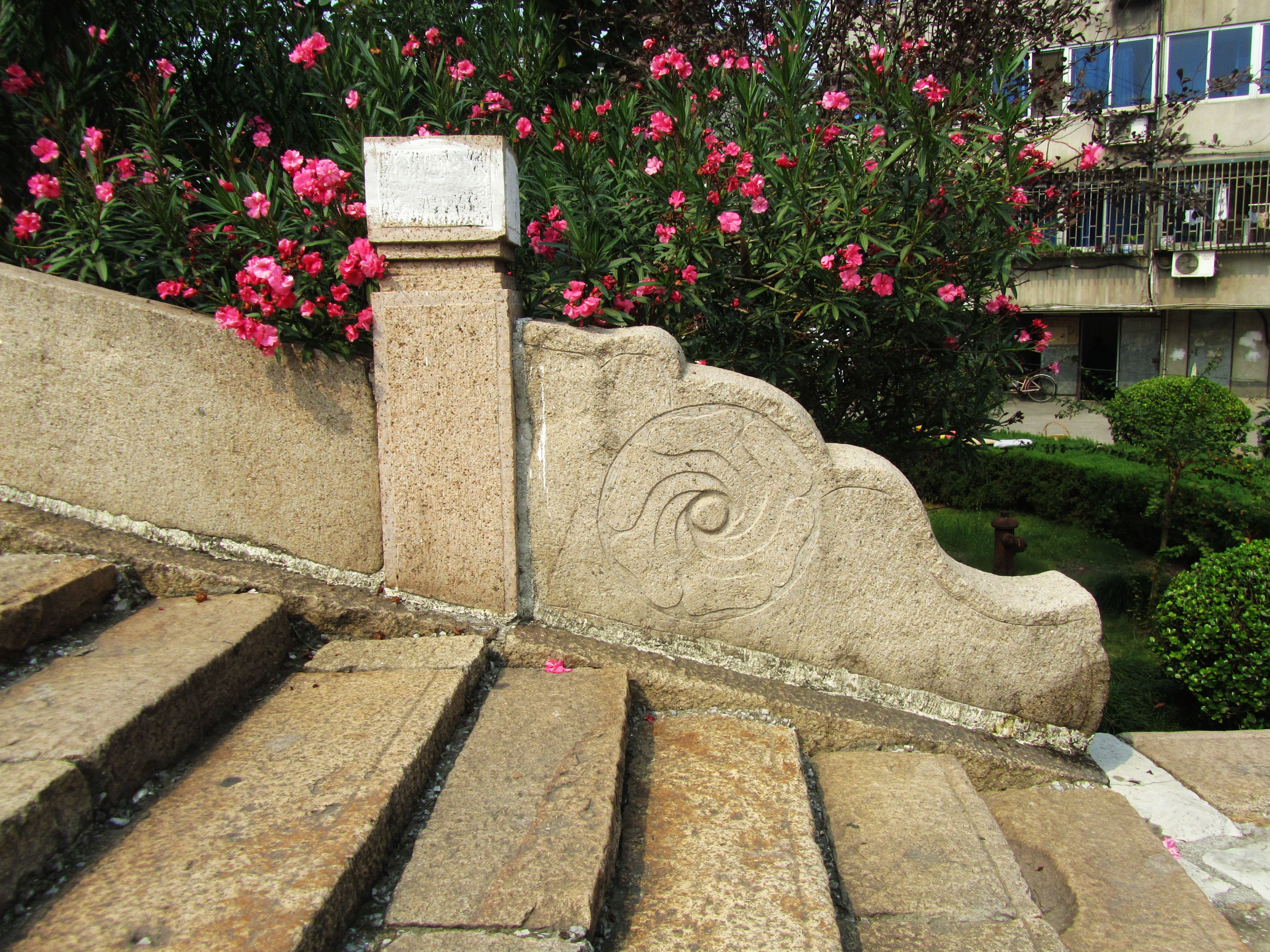
Drum-shaped bearing stone

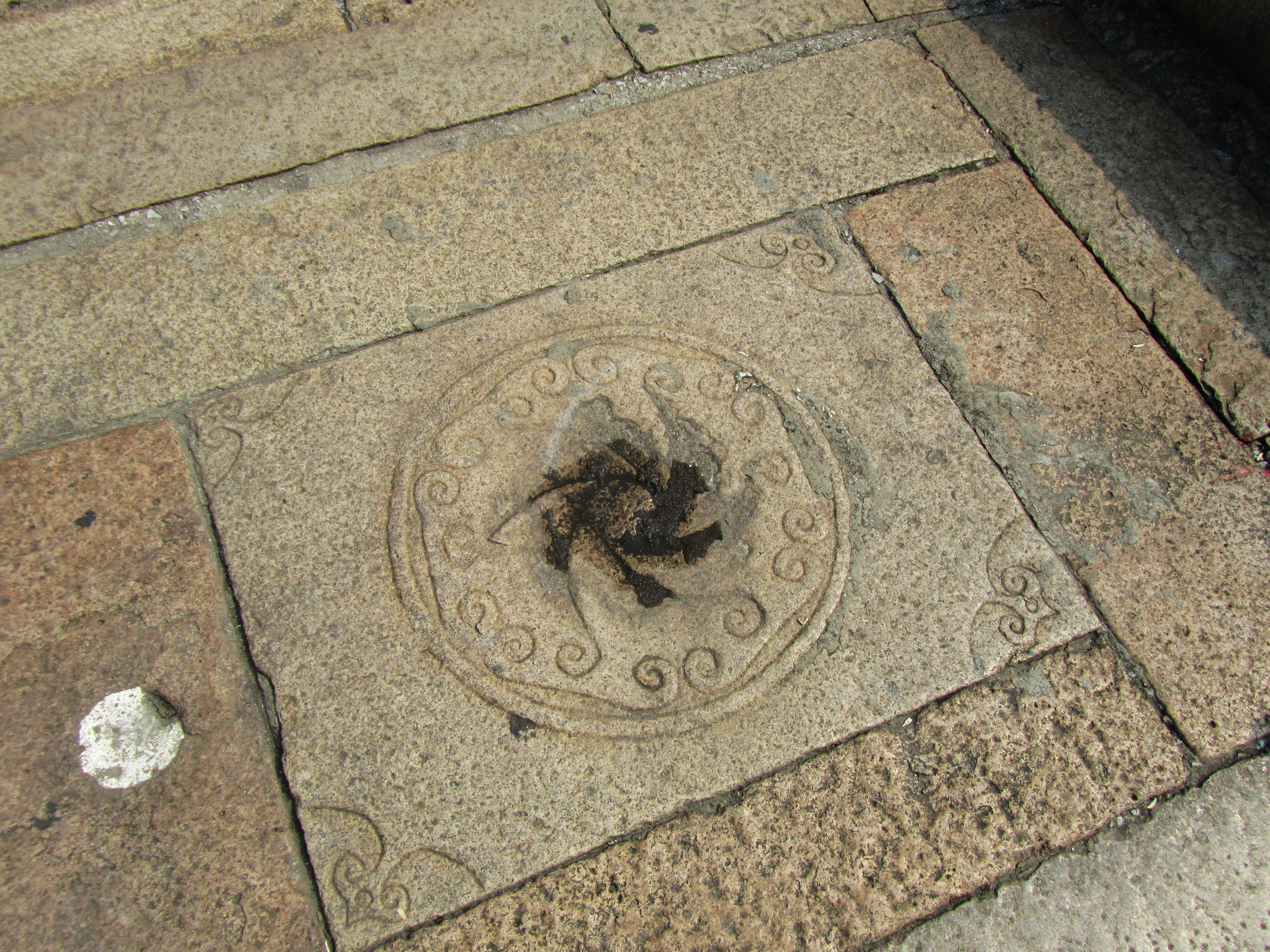
Dongcang Bridge in October 2013

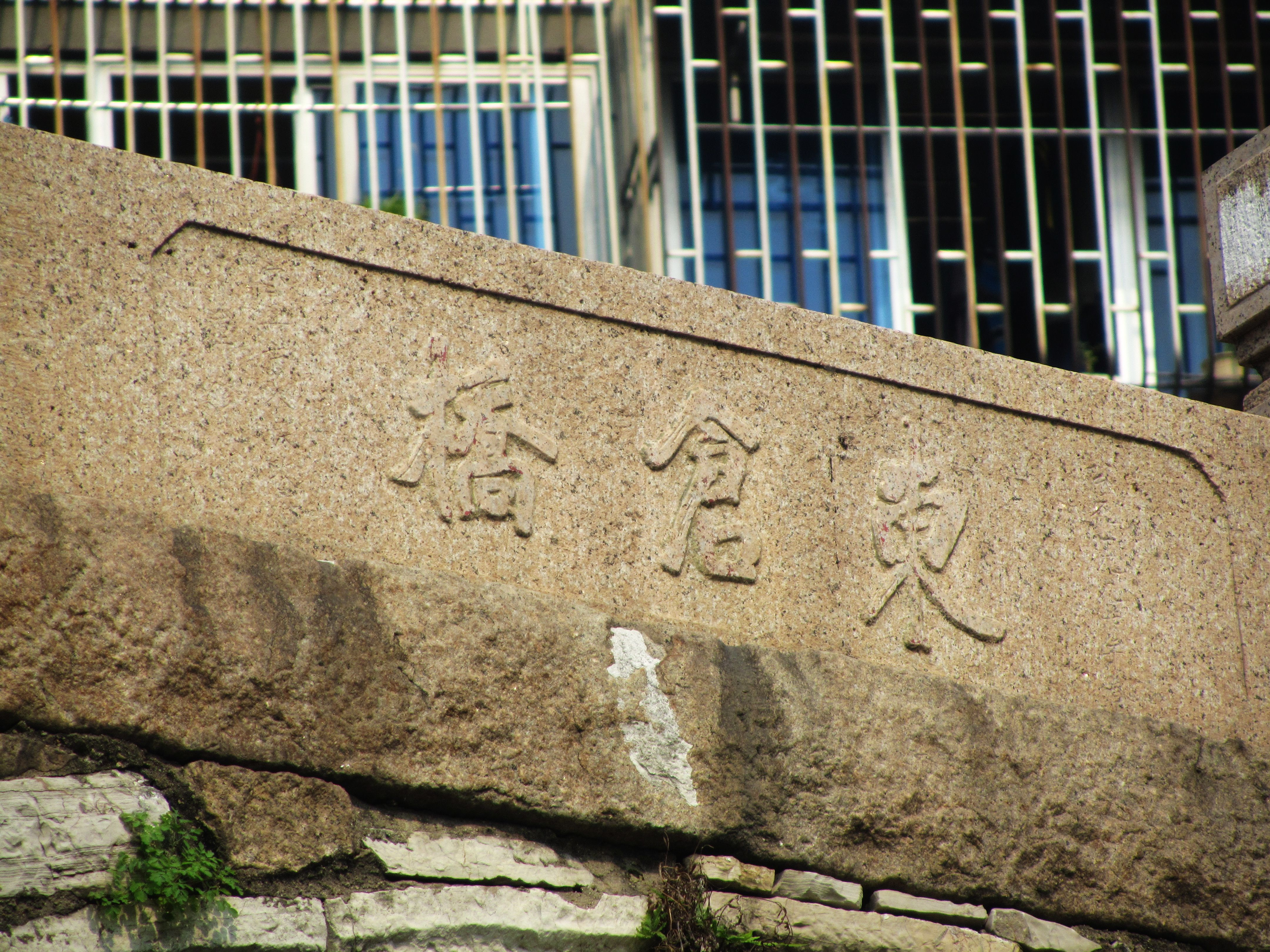
Dongcang Bridge in October 2013
