= Xinjian, Jiangsu =

Xinjian 新建镇
- Town
- Location in Jiangsu
- Coordinates: 31°34′12″N 119°39′28″E
- Country: People's Republic of China
- Province: Jiangsu
- Prefecture-level city: Wuxi
- County-level city: Yixing
- Time zone: UTC+8 (China Standard)

Xinjian (Chinese: 新建; pinyin: Xīnjiàn) is a town in Yixing, Jiangsu province, China. As of 2018, it has one residential community and 6 villages under its administration.

== See also ==
- List of township-level divisions of Jiangsu
