= Tupu =

Tupu may refer to:

== People ==
- Lani Tupu (born 1955), New Zealand actor
- Tania Tupu (born 1973), New Zealand basketball player
- Tupu Atanatiu Taingakawa Te Waharoa (1844–1929), New Zealand tribal leader
- Tupu Ulufale (born 1987), Samoan rugby league football player

== Other ==
- Tupu (TV series), a 2005 French and Canadian animated series
- Tupu (pin), an Andean shawl fastener
- Tupu (unit), Incan unit of length

== See also ==
- Tapu (disambiguation)
- Topu (born 1982), Bangladeshi singer
