= Yixing =

Yixing 宜兴市 Ihing
- County-level city
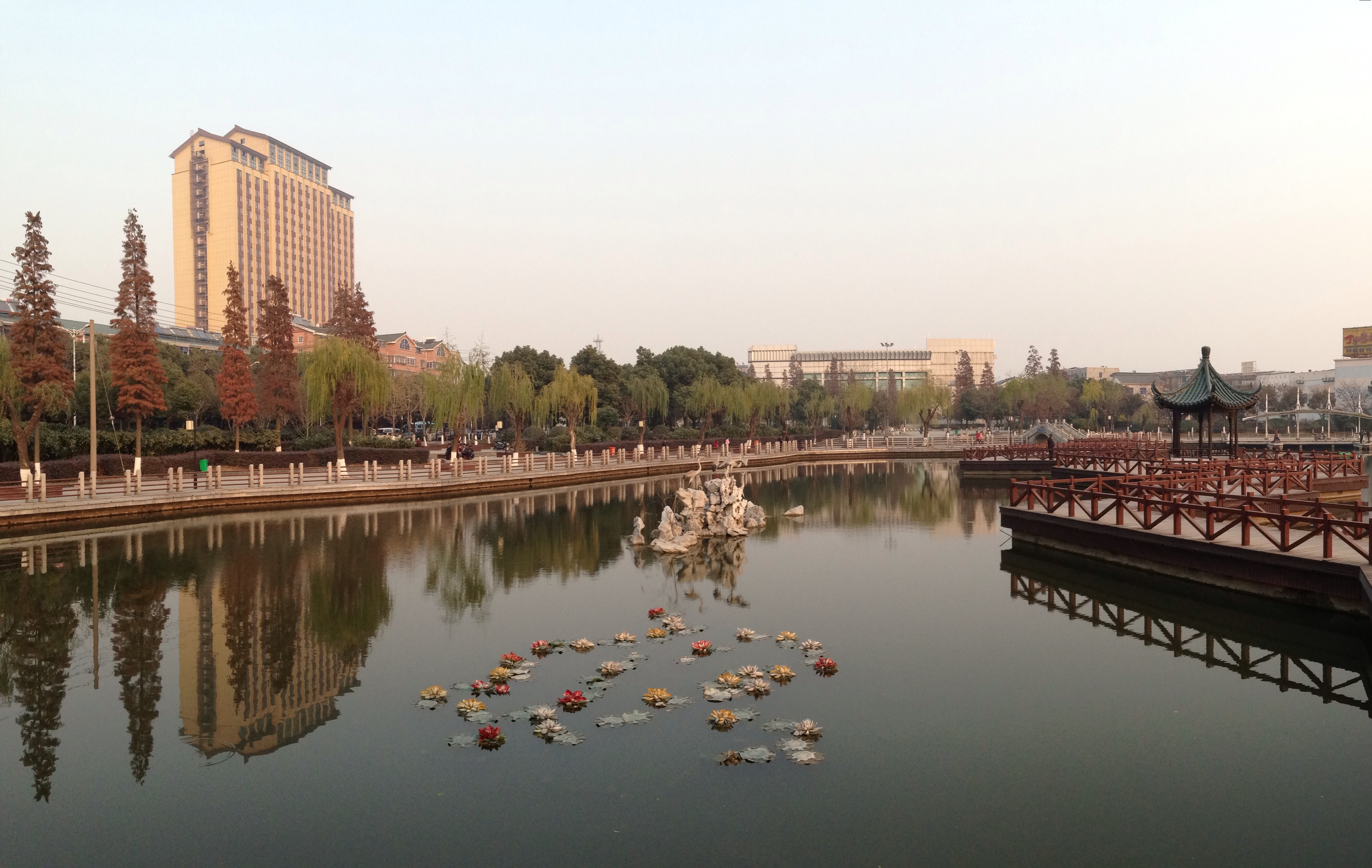
- A park in Yixing

- Location within Jiangsu
- Coordinates: 31°21′36″N 119°48′54″E
- Country: China
- Province: Jiangsu
- Prefecture-level city: Wuxi
- Seat: Yicheng Subdistrict

Area
  - Total: 1,996.6 km^{2} (770.9 sq mi)

Population (2020)
  - Total: 1,075,800
  - Density: 538.82/km^{2} (1,395.5/sq mi)
- Time zone: UTC+8 (China Standard)
- Postal code: 214200
- Area code: 0510
- Website: www.yixing.gov.cn

Yixing (simplified Chinese: 宜兴; traditional Chinese: 宜興; pinyin: Yíxīng) is a county-level city administered under the prefecture-level city of Wuxi in southern Jiangsu province, China, and is part of the Yangtze River Delta. The city is known for its traditional Yixing clay ware tea pots. It is a pene-exclave with Changzhou. The city spans an area of 1,996.6 square kilometres (770.9 mi^{2}), and has a registered hukou population of about 1,075,800 as of 2020.

== History ==
=== Early imperial and Six Dynasties ===
Yangxian County was established no later than the early Han dynasty, with its administrative seat located southwest of modern-day Yixing.

The Zhou clan rose to prominence as a powerful local gentry family during the 3rd and 4th centuries, beginning with Zhou Fang, a distinguished general and administrator of Eastern Wu. His son, Zhou Chu, is prominently featured among the clan members in A New Account of the Tales of the World in connection with the "Eradicating the Three Scourges (除三橫[害])" legendary narrative.

In 276, the last emperor of Eastern Wu, Sun Hao, authorized Zhou Chu to preside over the feng and shan sacrifices at Limo Mountain in the southwest of Yixing—in the emperor's own absence. The mountain was subsequently renamed Mt. Guo (Guoshan, 國山). The extant Stele for the Shan Sacrifice on Mt. Guo (Shan Guoshan bei) commemorates the ritual.

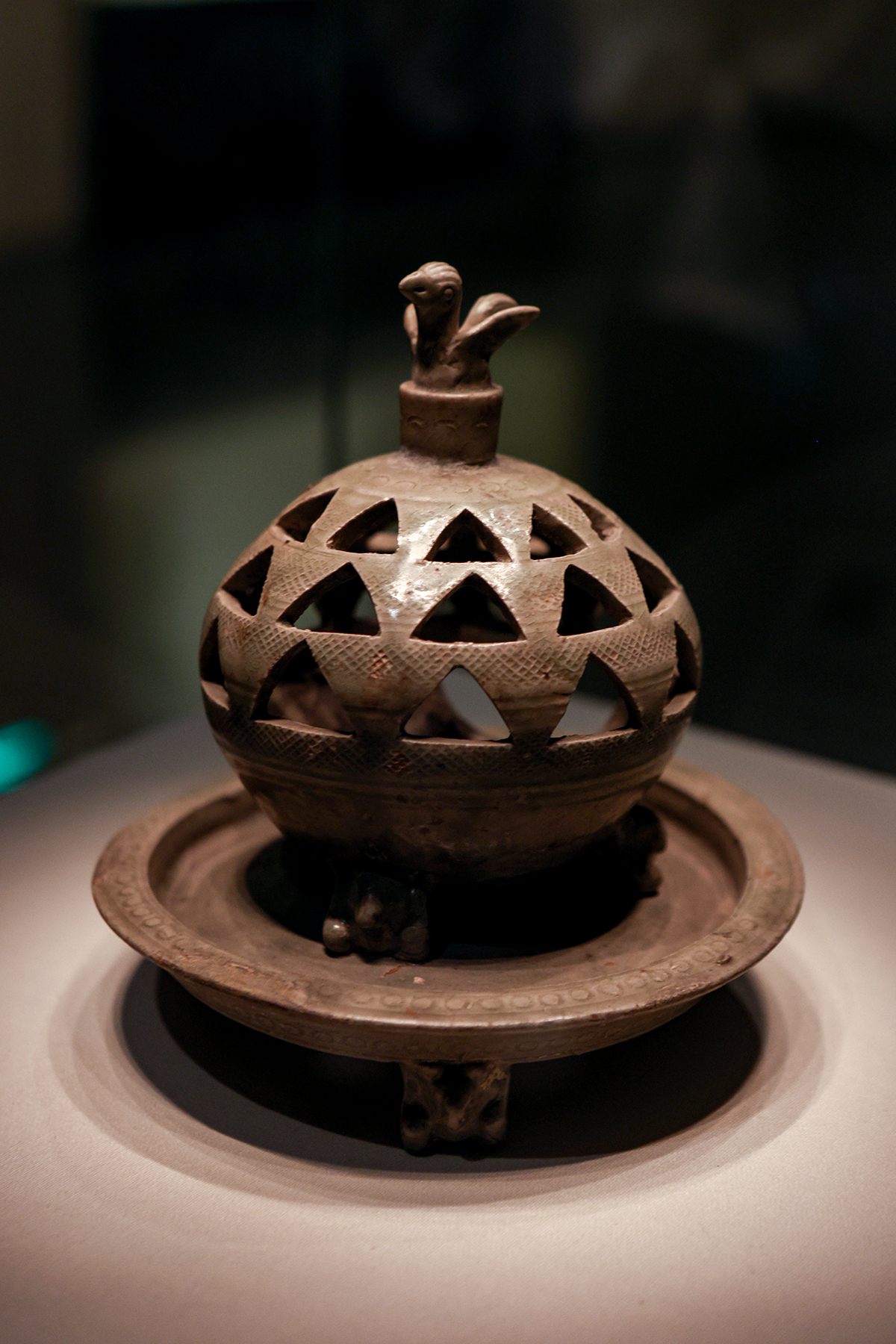
Celadon incense burner, from the Zhou clan tomb group; National Museum of China.

The clan's power peaked under the third generation Zhou Qi, who commanded a significant local militia to suppress three major rebellions. In recognition of his military achievements, the imperial court established Guoshan County southwest of Yangxian. Subsequently, the Yixing (义兴; 義興; Yìxìng; 'Prosperous Righteousness') Commandery was created from parts of Wuxing and Danyang commanderies, with its administrative seat at Yangxian.

Nevertheless, the Zhou family's growing military independence alarmed the court, which increasingly viewed their regional dominance as a threat to imperial authority. Tensions persisted between the Zhou clan and the northern displaced elite in the capital.

After Qi's death in 313, his son, Zhou Xie (周勰), attempted an uprising fueled by this historical friction. The plot failed after being exposed by his uncle Zhou Zha (周札), who had been named as the rebellion's leader without his prior consent. Despite this, the emperor Sima Rui remained wary of the clan's military force. Their regional dominance finally ended after 322, when Wang Dun utilized the rival Shen clan of Wuxing to suppress the Zhous and dismantle their authority.

During the period, the Junshan (均山, also known as the Nanshan, 南山) kilns in southern Yixing produced celadon, though the quality was generally inferior to their counterparts in eastern Zhejiang. Archaeologists speculate that the decline of local celadon production was a result of the collapse of the Zhou clan's regional dominance.

=== Sui to early Ming dynasties ===
Following the Sui conquest in 589 CE, the Yixing Commandery was abolished, and Yangxian and Guoshan counties were merged to form the new Yixing County, which was placed under the jurisdiction of Piling, later Changzhou.

Archaeological evidence indicates a resurgence of celadon production in the mid‑Tang period, marked by the expansion of kiln sites across southern Yixing. However, this industry declined once more by the mid‑10th century, after which local production shifted primarily to utilitarian pottery, including lugged portable ewers.

In 976 CE, upon the accession of Emperor Taizong of Song (born Zhao Guangyi), the county was renamed to the similar sounding Yixing (宜兴; 宜興; Yíxìng), due to the naming taboo. The renaming was likely an allusion to a passage in the Doctrine of the Mean: "Righteousness is the accordance of actions with what is right (義者宜也)."

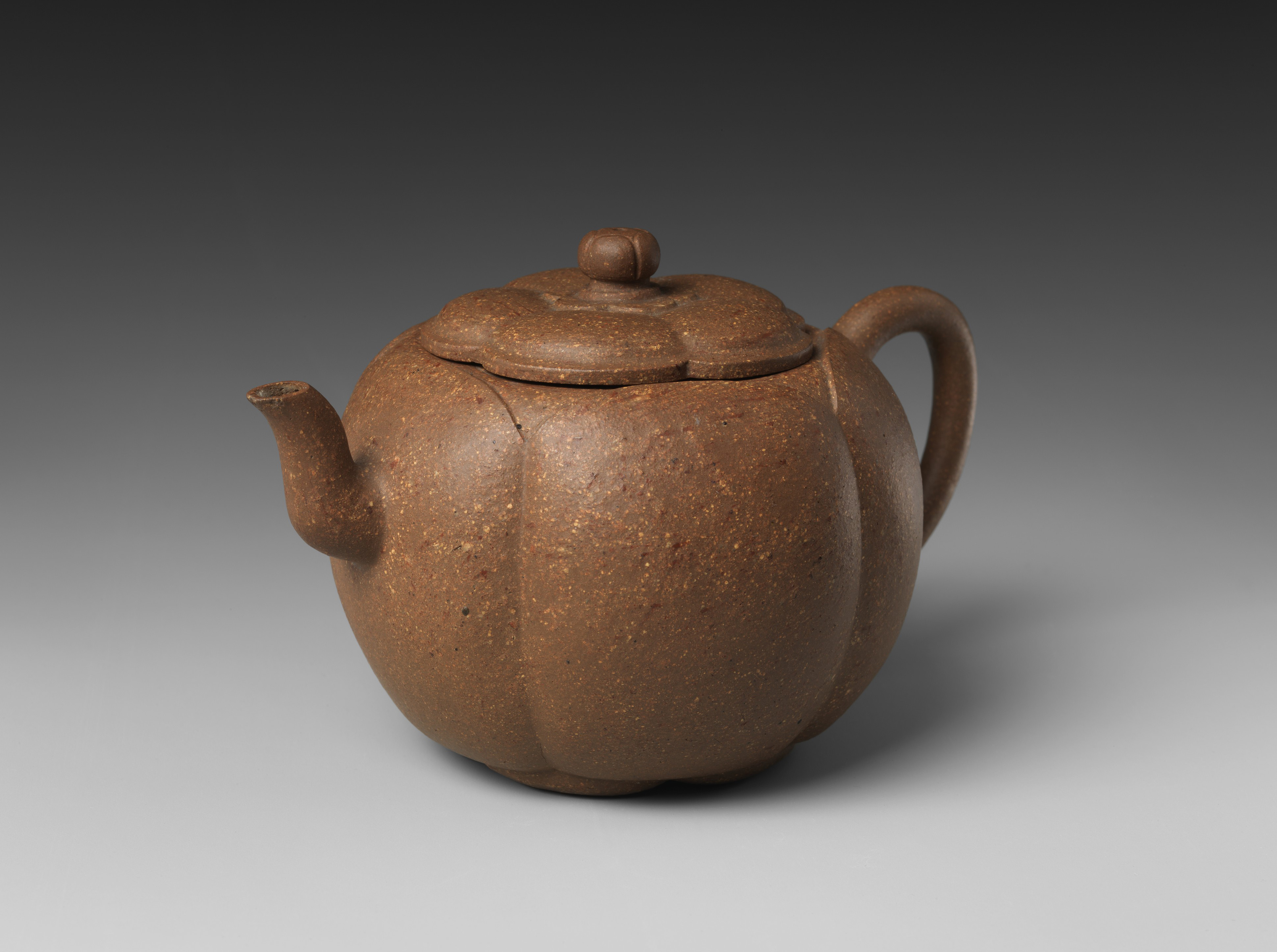
Yixing stoneware teapot in plum blossom form. Attributed to Shi Dabin. The Metropolitan Museum of Art.

By the mid-8th century, Yixing had been designated as an imperial tribute tea source. To oversee this lucrative production, the Yuan dynasty established a Superintendency (提領所) in the region. By the Ming dynasty, Yixing evolved into a commercial hub for tea; the government established a Tea Control Station (批驗所) to verify certificates and tax tea from both local and neighboring regions. Records from 1537 underscore this scale, with the station processing approximately 414.9 tons of tea in that year alone.

=== Late Imperial and Republican era ===
The Ming dynasty's transition to loose-leaf tea transformed brewing practices, prompting Yixing potters in the 16th century to adapt wine ewers into some of the earliest teapots for steeping. Popularized by masters like Shi Dabin, these unglazed stoneware became highly valued in the late Ming; contemporary records indicate that a single piece by "Three Masters" could command five to six taels of silver.

Beyond their interest in stoneware, the gentry of late imperial Yixing pursued other forms of elite art connoisseurship. The painter Dong Qichang pawned the Dwelling in the Fuchun Mountains scroll for 1,000 taels of silver to his fellow jinshi, the Yixing native Wu Zhengzhi. It remained in Yixing from 1634 until 1650, when Wu's son attempted to burn the masterpiece as a funerary offering. Rescued by his nephew but permanently split into two pieces, the charred scroll remains a documented landmark in Chinese art history.

In 1633, the abuses and extortion by bondservants (yi-nan, 義男) of powerful gentry, notably the Chen family, provoked violent reprisals by peasants in Yixing. The unrest escalated into the looting of estates and the desecration of the Chen ancestral tombs. At court, political opponents cited the incident to attack Grand Secretary Zhou Yanru (周延儒), a native of Yixing and kinsman by marriage of the Chen family, leading to his dismissal. Unrest continued, and in 1634 a second wave of rioting centered on Zhou himself. After suppressing the disturbances, the authorities formally prosecuted the bondservants as the primary instigators.

By the mid-17th century, Martino Martini noted Yixing (Gnihing) ware as a nationwide phenomenon. This trend went global through the Dutch and English East India Companies, which imported the ceramics as profitable ballast. As an element of the European Chinoiserie craze, Yixing's "red porcelain" prompted centers in Delft, Staffordshire, and Meissen to produce their own imitations.

The 1725 administrative reform split the area into Yixing and Jingxi (荆溪; 荊溪; Jīngxī Xiàn) counties; both jurisdictions shared the same walled seat. The Taiping Rebellion devastated two counties, initially triggering a massive influx of migrants from northern Jiangsu during the 1860s. By the late 19th century, the migration pattern shifted to include settlers from Henan, Hubei, and Hunan. By the turn of the 20th century, 74 charity granaries had been established across the two counties. However, land registers were systematically manipulated by local interests: productive acreage was fraudulently categorized as "disaster-affected precincts" (laozaitu, 老災圖) or newly reclaimed wasteland to secure tax exemptions, casting serious doubt on the reliability of official agricultural statistics.

In 1912, the Republican government abolished Jingxi County and merged it back into Yixing County. By the 1920s, the rural population comprised 6% owner-peasants and 8% landlords, while tenant farmers and agricultural laborers accounted for 30% and 56%, respectively. Surveys at the time indicate that fixed rents often exceeded 60% of a tenant's net income. While the land tax in Yixing had remained stable at 0.552 silver dollars per mu throughout the Beiyang era (1912–1926), the sudden Kuomintang imposition of various surtaxes following the Northern Expedition drove the total burden to 1.184 silver dollars per mu in 1927 alone.

The 1927 Yixing Uprising instigated by sparse Chinese Communist Party elements emerged as an "isolated outbreak". On November 1, local CCP organizers mobilized several thousand peasants to capture the county seat and establish a committee. Against a backdrop of escalating surtaxes and rents, the rebels executed five members of the local gentry and killed nine officials. Before Kuomintang forces retook the city two days later, thirty properties were destroyed and assets from three hundred businesses were confiscated.

=== People's Republic of China ===
Administratively, Yixing moved from Changzhou (1949) to Suzhou (1953) and Zhenjiang (1956) prefectures. In 1958, seven vertical shafts and one inclined shaft were established in Yixing to meet the coal demand of the Great Leap Forward steel production. However, most of these facilities closed by 1962 due to economic inefficiency, with a total cumulative output of approximately 550,000 tonnes over the decade.

In 1969, following chronic coal shortages in the industrial centers of southern Jiangsu, administrative control of Yixing's mining sector was transferred to Wuxi City. Then several mining towns developed, and a significant production surge with annual output exceeding 700,000 tonnes by 1972.

In March 1983, the entire Yixing County was formally placed under the prefecture-level city of Wuxi. In January 1988, Yixing was reorganized from a county into a county-level city. The local coal industry eventually declined as reserves were depleted, concluding in 1999 with the closure of the Bainichang Mine, the final coal shaft in southern Jiangsu.

== Geography ==
Yixing is located on the western shore of Lake Tai, with about 43 kilometres (27 mi) of lake shoreline. It lies at the junction of Jiangsu, Zhejiang and Anhui, and is divided into a predominantly low-lying north and a hillier south: roughly the northern two-thirds consist of plains interrupted by residual hills, while the southern third is occupied by hills and low mountains.

The southern hills form part of the northern foothills of the Tianmu Mountains. In this area, a series of north-northeast–trending synclinal basins are bounded by erosion-resistant terrigenous clastic rocks that stand out as ridges over 200 m high. Within the basins, more soluble marine carbonate rocks (primarily limestone and dolomite) have been dissolved to form karst depressions and caves, including Shanjuan Cave and Zhanggong Cave, which are notable scenic and cultural sites in the region. The Yixing–Liyang uplands also contain Huangtading (黄塔顶), at 611 metres (2,005 ft) above sea level the second-highest peak in Jiangsu.

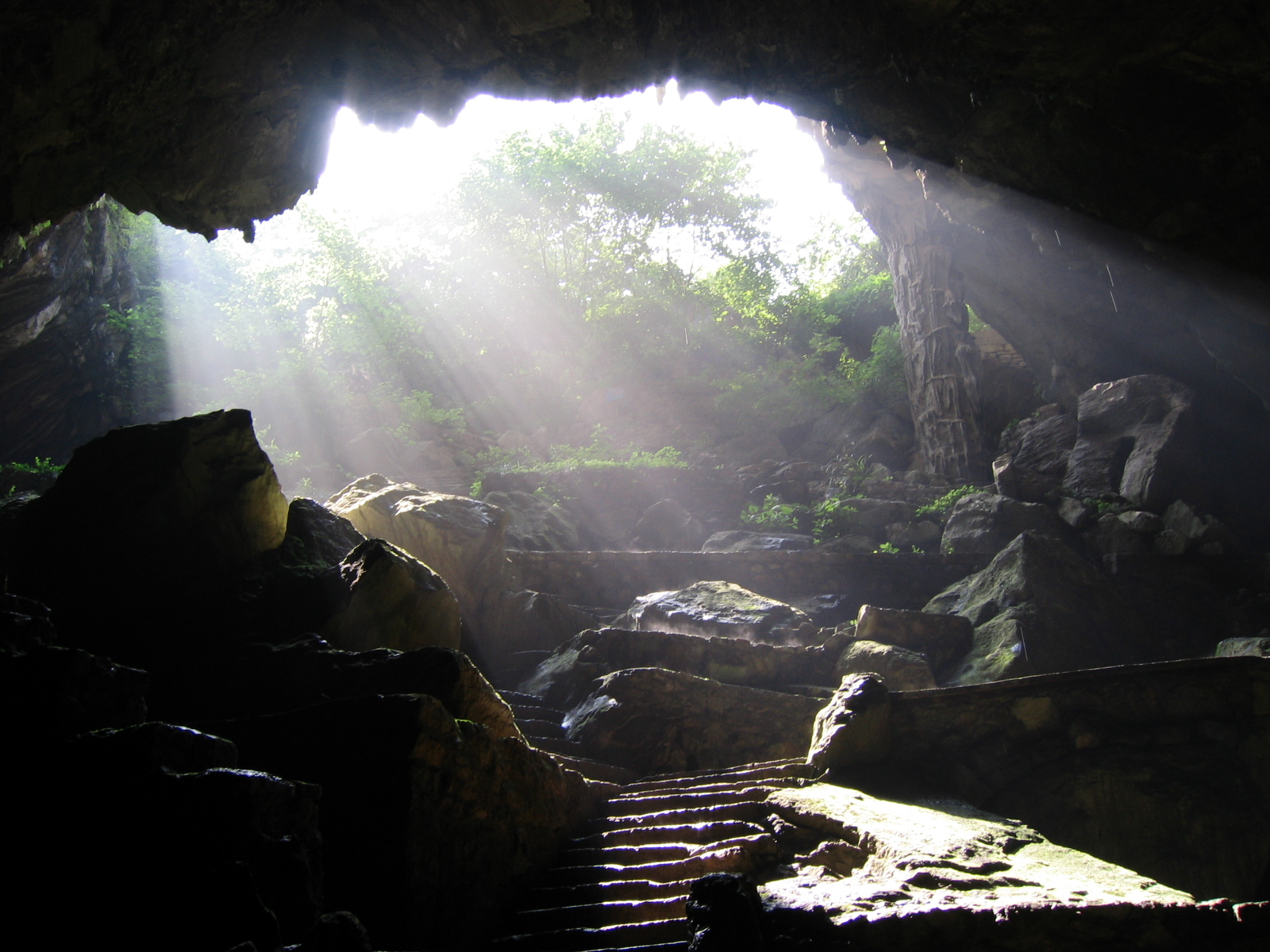
Zhanggong Cave, a karst solution cave

In the western part of the city, the terrain consists of embankment-enclosed wetlands. The northwest and central parts, by contrast, are characterized by fertile alluvial plains. To the north, Yixing is separated from the Wujin District of Changzhou by Lake Ge.

Yixing Proper was flanked by two lakes, Dongjiu to the east and Xijiu to the west, historically. Over time, the eastern portion of Lake Xijiu near the proper evolved into a distinct circular lake named Tuanjiu. Together, they are referred to as the "Sanjiu".

As remnants of Ancient Lake Taihu, the Sanjiu lakes are situated in the lower reaches of the Yili River System. They discharge into Lake Taihu via the Dapukgang and other channels. These water bodies are characterized as flushing lakes (throughflow lakes) with an extremely high water turnover rate. Traditionally classified as seasonal lakes, their water levels exhibited dramatic natural fluctuations.

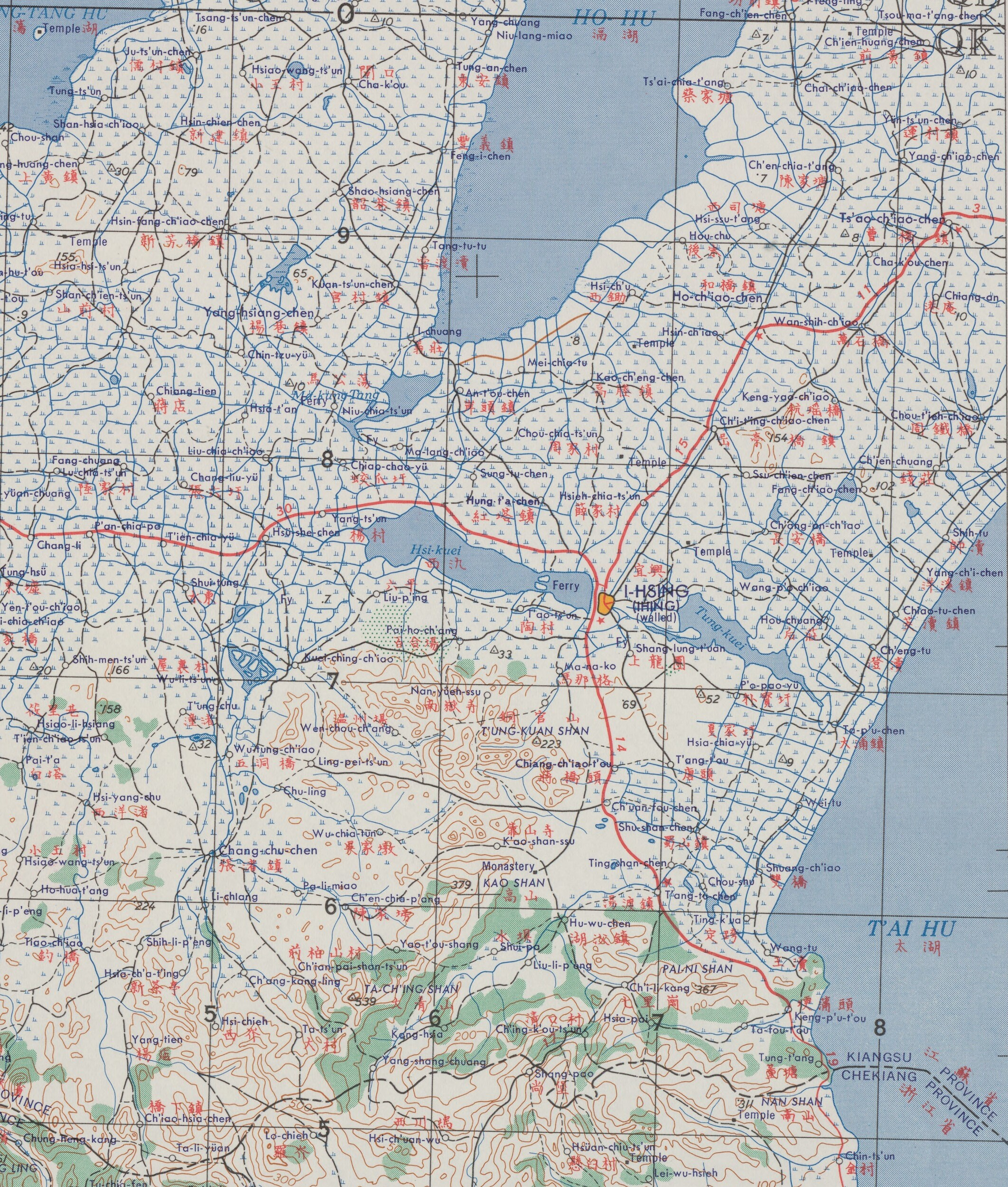
Yixing as shown on an Army Map Service map, 1955.

Starting in the 1960s, extensive hydraulic engineering was conducted for flood control and urban landscaping, which altered the lakes' natural hydrological patterns. Since the 1970s, rapid urbanization and industrial-agricultural expansion led to significant nutrient loading, making the Sanjiu lakes a major source of pollution entering Lake Taihu during that period. Research indicates that massive catchment-wide restoration since 2007 has significantly improved nutrient levels and biological diversity, effectively mitigating these urbanization-driven impacts.

Beneath the Yixing–Dingshan area, Carboniferous lacustrine sediments consisting mainly of argillaceous and silt-rich rocks contain abundant plant fossils. These sedimentary units host extensive ceramic clay deposits that provide the raw material base for the local stoneware industry, including the production of Yixing stoneware.

Natural vegetation in the hills around Yixing is dominated by mixed evergreen and deciduous broadleaf forests and extensive bamboo groves, which form the primary habitat of the Pleioblastus yixingensis. The complex, humid microhabitats created by the dissected terrain in the Yixing–Liyang uplands mark the northern limit of the distribution of Zanthoxylum ailanthoides in China. Under pressure from modern human activities, some rare plant communities have contracted or disappeared on the Yixing side and now persist mainly on the Liyang side of the uplands.

=== Climate ===
Climate data for Yixing, elevation 16 m (52 ft), (1991–2020 normals, extremes 1959–present)
| Month | Jan | Feb | Mar | Apr | May | Jun | Jul | Aug | Sep | Oct | Nov | Dec | Year |
|---|---|---|---|---|---|---|---|---|---|---|---|---|---|
| Record high °C (°F) | 21.7 (71.1) | 28.0 (82.4) | 31.5 (88.7) | 34.9 (94.8) | 38.2 (100.8) | 37.5 (99.5) | 41.3 (106.3) | 42.2 (108.0) | 37.3 (99.1) | 38.2 (100.8) | 30.0 (86.0) | 23.5 (74.3) | 42.2 (108.0) |
| Mean daily maximum °C (°F) | 7.5 (45.5) | 9.8 (49.6) | 15.7 (60.3) | 21.7 (71.1) | 26.6 (79.9) | 29.0 (84.2) | 33.1 (91.6) | 33.0 (91.4) | 28.3 (82.9) | 23.2 (73.8) | 17.1 (62.8) | 10.3 (50.5) | 21.3 (70.3) |
| Daily mean °C (°F) | 3.1 (37.6) | 5.2 (41.4) | 10.2 (50.4) | 16.1 (61.0) | 21.3 (70.3) | 24.7 (76.5) | 28.5 (83.3) | 28.4 (83.1) | 23.7 (74.7) | 17.9 (64.2) | 11.7 (53.1) | 5.0 (41.0) | 16.3 (61.4) |
| Mean daily minimum °C (°F) | −0.4 (31.3) | 1.5 (34.7) | 5.6 (42.1) | 10.9 (51.6) | 16.7 (62.1) | 21.1 (70.0) | 24.8 (76.6) | 25.0 (77.0) | 20.1 (68.2) | 13.6 (56.5) | 7.4 (45.3) | 0.7 (33.3) | 12.3 (54.1) |
| Record low °C (°F) | −13.1 (8.4) | −12.9 (8.8) | −5.0 (23.0) | −1.0 (30.2) | 6.4 (43.5) | 12.9 (55.2) | 16.8 (62.2) | 15.1 (59.2) | 10.6 (51.1) | 2.3 (36.1) | −5.8 (21.6) | −10.3 (13.5) | −13.1 (8.4) |
| Average precipitation mm (inches) | 83.0 (3.27) | 76.7 (3.02) | 104.6 (4.12) | 97.2 (3.83) | 114.3 (4.50) | 225.3 (8.87) | 200.6 (7.90) | 178.1 (7.01) | 114.4 (4.50) | 77.7 (3.06) | 66.4 (2.61) | 53.0 (2.09) | 1,391.3 (54.78) |
| Average precipitation days (≥ 0.1 mm) | 11.2 | 10.8 | 12.8 | 11.8 | 12.0 | 14.1 | 13.5 | 13.2 | 9.9 | 8.3 | 9.9 | 8.5 | 136 |
| Average snowy days | 3.6 | 2.2 | 0.8 | 0 | 0 | 0 | 0 | 0 | 0 | 0 | 0.2 | 0.9 | 7.7 |
| Average relative humidity (%) | 78 | 77 | 75 | 73 | 75 | 81 | 80 | 81 | 80 | 79 | 79 | 76 | 78 |
| Mean monthly sunshine hours | 116.2 | 115.2 | 137.8 | 161.5 | 171.5 | 134.8 | 190.5 | 191.1 | 157.6 | 158.3 | 136.4 | 130.5 | 1,801.4 |
| Percentage possible sunshine | 36 | 37 | 37 | 41 | 40 | 32 | 44 | 47 | 43 | 45 | 43 | 42 | 41 |
Source: China Meteorological Administration

== Administrative divisions ==
Yixing is divided into 5 subdistricts, 14 towns, and 2 other township-level divisions. These township-level divisions are then further divided into 102 residential communities and 207 administrative villages. The city's government is seated in Yicheng Subdistrict.

=== Subdistricts ===
Yixing administers the following 5 subdistricts:

- Yicheng Subdistrict (宜城街道)
- Fangqiao Subdistrict (芳桥街道)
- Qiting Subdistrict (屺亭街道)
- Xinjie Subdistrict (新街街道)
- Xinzhuang Subdistrict (新庄街道)

=== Towns ===
Yixing administers the following 14 towns:

- Dapu (大浦镇)
- Dingshu (丁蜀镇)
- Heqiao (和桥镇)
- Hufu (湖㳇镇)
- Gaocheng (高塍镇)
- Guanlin (官林镇)
- Taihua (太华镇)
- Wanshi (万石镇)
- Xizhu (西渚镇)
- Xinjian (新建镇)
- Xushe (徐舍镇)
- Yangxiang (杨巷镇)
- Zhangzhu (张渚镇)
- Zhoutie (周铁镇)

=== Other township-level divisions ===
Yixing administers the following 2 other township-level divisions:

- Huanke Park (环科园)
- Yixing Economic Development Zone (宜兴经济开发区)

== Demographics ==
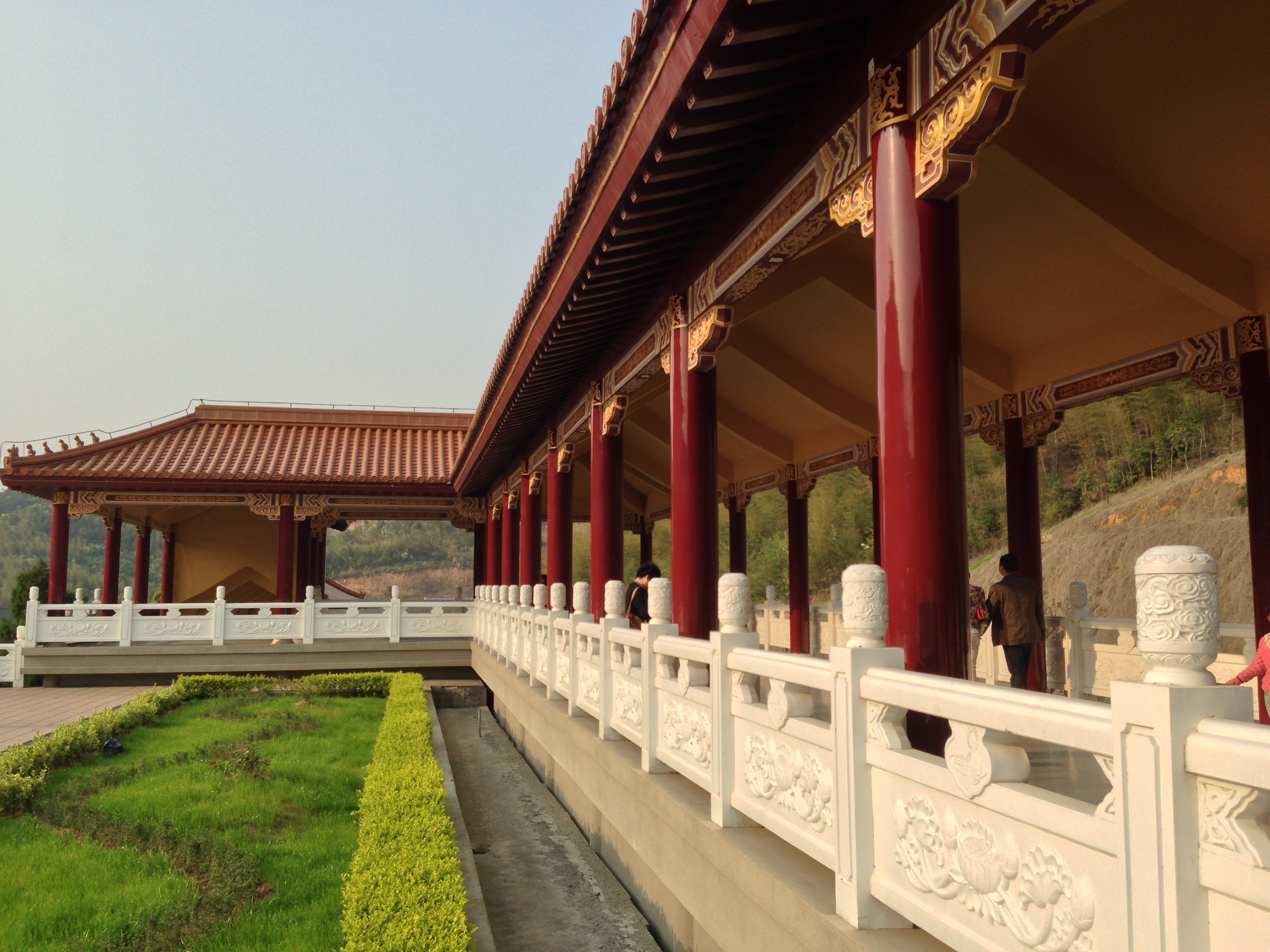
Traditional architecture in Yixing

As of 2020, the city government estimates Yixing's registered hukou population to be 1,075,800 people. Of this, 529,300 residents are male, and 546,500 are female. The city saw 7,038 births in 2020, giving it a birth rate of 6.53‰ (per thousand), and 9,694 deaths, giving it a death rate of 8.99‰. This gave Yixing a rate of natural increase of -2.46‰ in 2020.

The city is home to 42 different ethnic minorities, who comprise a population of about 15,000 (1.39% of Yixing's total population).

== Economy ==
As of 2020, Yixing has a gross domestic product (GDP) of 183.221 billion renminbi (RMB). This represented a 3% increase from the previous year. The city's per capita disposable income stands as 50,987 RMB, a 5.1% increase from the previous year. This figure stands at 61,090 RMB for urban residents, and 32,430 RMB for rural residents, reflecting a 4.4% and 6.6% increase from the previous year, respectively.

== Transportation ==
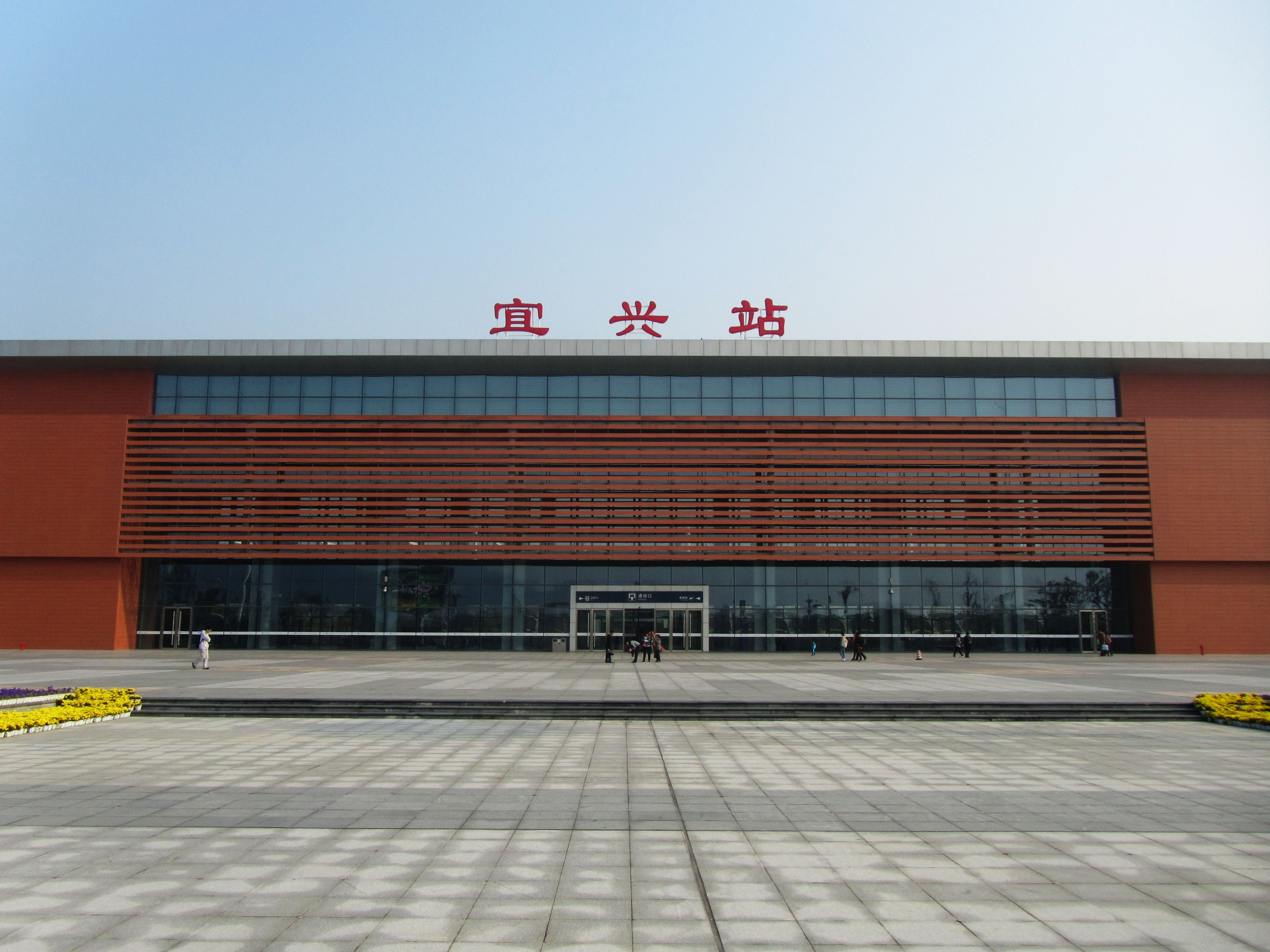
Yixing railway station in October 2013

The city is served by three railway stations: the Yixing railway station, the Yixing North railway station, and the Dingshan railway station. Yixing railway station is located on the Nanjing–Hangzhou high-speed railway, while the latter two are part of the Xinyi–Changxing railway.

In 2020, the Changyi Expressway (常宜高速), a section of the S39 Jiangyi Expressway linking Yixing to Jiangdu District in Yangzhou, was completed. The same year, the Yichang Expressway (宜长高速), a section of the S14/45 Hangchangyi Expressway linking Yixing to Changxing County, Huzhou and Hangzhou in neighboring Zhejiang province, was also completed.

== Tourist attractions ==
Dongcang Bridge is a historic stone arch bridge in the city.

== Notable people ==
- Ding Junhui, professional snooker player
- Jiang Fengzhi, musician erhu artist
- Xu Beihong, Chinese painting painter
- the ancestral home of Chiang Kai-shek
- Ge Mingxiang, 18th century potter
- Qian Yingying, artist
