= Guoshan Stele =

- 国山碑
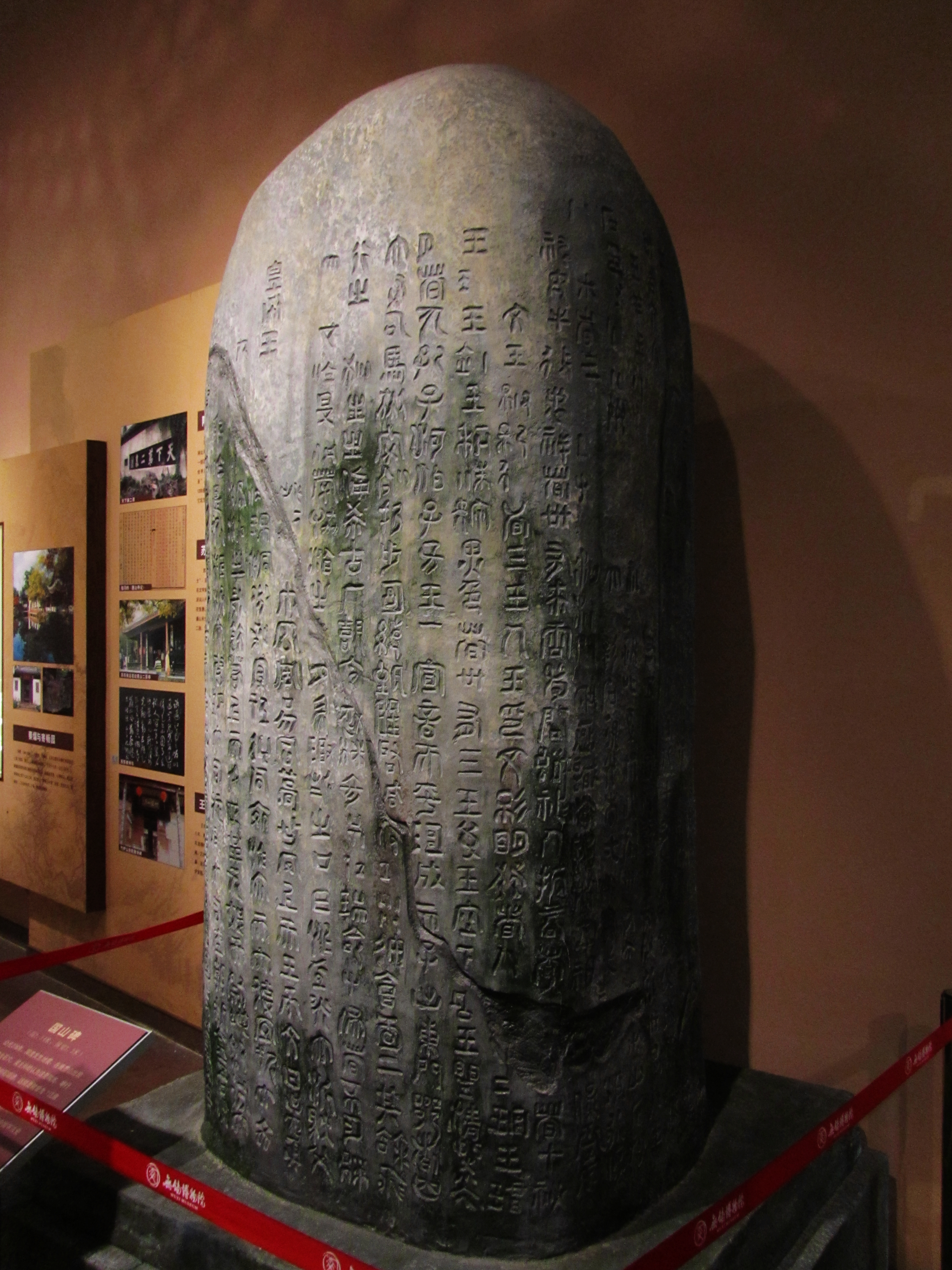
- Guoshan Stone Tablet in Wuxi Museum
- Interactive map of Guoshan Stele
- Location: Guoshan Mountain
- Coordinates: 31°18′03″N 119°39′11″E
- Type: Stele
- Material: Stone
- Height: 2.35m
- Completion date: 276

Guoshan Stele (Chinese: 国山碑) is a stele located at the west foot of Guoshan Mountain in Zhangzhu Town, Yixing City, Jiangsu Province in China. The stele was listed in the fifth batch of Major Site Protected for Its Historical and Cultural Value at the National Level in 2001.

Guoshan was originally called Limo Mountain. In the first year of the Tianxi reign in the Eastern Wu Kingdom of the Three Kingdoms era (276), after an earthquake, a stone chamber, which was over 100 feet long, emerged, in which a large stone stood. Sun Hao regarded it as an omen and sent a minister called Dong Chao to this mountain where he offered sacrifices to heaven and earth and set up a monument, which was later referred to as Guoshan Stele. With a height of 2.35 meters, the stele had a cylindrical shape and was engraved by general Sun Jian with Zhuan-style characters totalling 43 lines of 25 words. In the 29th year of Qianlong Reign (1764), County magistrate Tang Zhongmian built a stone-tablet pavilion here which was later restored by Chu Qiangnan during the Republican Era.

Now the pavilion has been expanded as Guoshan Stele Park.
