= Dapu, Yixing =

Dapu Town
- Town
- 大浦镇
- Country: China
- Province: Jiangsu
- Prefecture-level city: Wuxi
- County-level city: Yixing
- Time zone: UTC+08:00

Dapu Town (大浦镇) is a town in Yixing City, Jiangsu Province, China. It is near Lake Tai.

== See also ==
- List of township-level divisions of Jiangsu
