= Gaocheng, Jiangsu =

Gaocheng 高塍镇
- Town
- Location in Jiangsu
- Coordinates: 31°27′20″N 119°48′31″E
- Country: China
- Province: Jiangsu
- Prefecture-level city: Wuxi
- County-level city: Yixing
- Time zone: UTC+8 (China Standard)

Gaocheng (Chinese: 高塍; pinyin: Gāochéng) is a town in Yixing, Jiangsu province, China. As of 2020, it has 3 residential neighborhoods and 14 villages under its administration.

Neighborhoods

- Gaocheng Community
- Hongxing Community (红星社区)
- Taoyuan Community (桃园社区)

Villages

- Gaocheng Village
- Chengxi Village (塍西村)
- Xujing Village (胥井村)
- Gaoyao Village (高遥村)
- Fu Village (赋村)
- Zhiquan Village (志泉村)
- Meijiadu Village (梅家渎村)
- Tianshengwei Village (天生圩村)
- Fandao Village (范道村)
- Liuwei Village (六圩村)
- Hongta Village (红塔村)
- Xujiaqiao Village (徐家桥村)
- Songdu Village (宋渎村)
- Xiaozhangshu Village (肖张墅村)

== See also ==
- List of township-level divisions of Jiangsu
