= Codrin Țapu =

Romanian author and psychologist (born 1973)

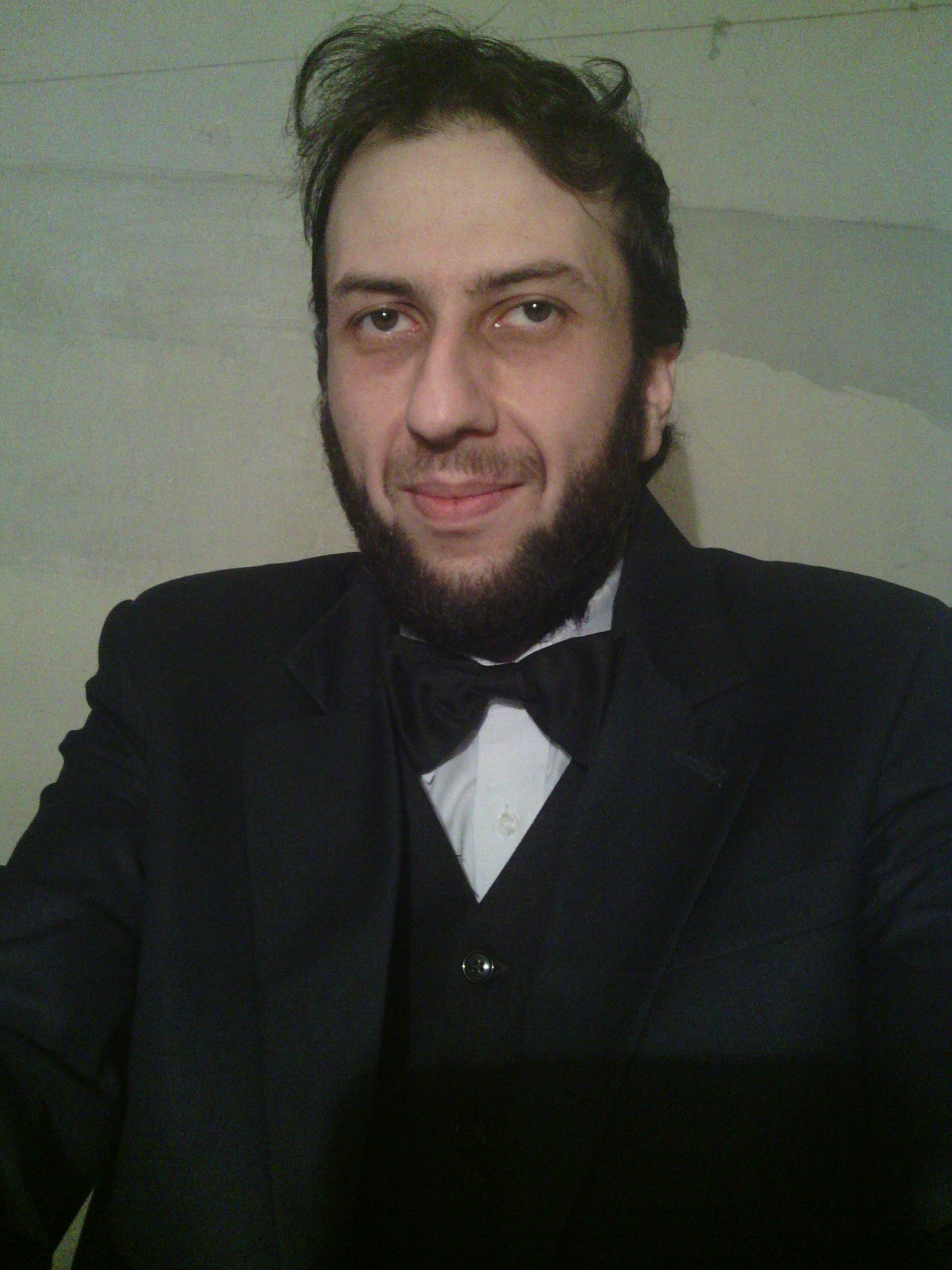
- Born: 17 December 1973 (age 52); Bucharest
- Education: University of Bucharest

Codrin Ștefan Țapu (born 17 December 1973) is a Romanian writer, psychologist, and aphorist. His work is focused on striking a middle ground between spiritual- and material-based belief systems, in the context of the multiple dimensions and nuances of the self.

== Life and career ==
Țapu was born in Bucharest, and attended the University of Bucharest, where he earned his bachelor's, master's, and doctoral degrees in psychology. From 1998, he worked as an instructor at the psychology department of Hyperion University. In 2000, he was awarded there the chair of lecturer extraordinary. In 2006, he was appointed an associate professor of psychology at the University of Agronomic Sciences and Veterinary Medicine, being the first chair of the postgraduate module of counseling.

== Work ==
Țapu's work addresses the multidimensionality of the self and the integrative study of a person. By integrating spirituality with materialism, he proposed a perspective of interconnected spiritual support systems.

Țapu summarized the hypostatic approach to personality in his 2001 book. The hypostatic model, originated in mathematical logic by Charles Sanders Peirce with his "hypostatic abstraction", argues, in Țapu's view, that the person presents herself in a multitude of different aspects or hypostases, depending on the internal and external realities she relates to, including different epistemological approaches to the study of personality.

The hypostatic model describes personality and self as well as interpersonal relationships, with implications in dating. Personality is viewed as both an agency and a relatively stable construction, as the model is accompanied with specific methods of assessment, counseling, and psychotherapy addressing each of the personality dimensions. The model was listed also as a resource on counselor's qualities in life quality management.

As part of the efforts of revival and development of psychology in post-communist Romania, Tapu published a dictionary of psychopathology, and a textbook of humanistic systems psychology.

The work of Țapu has been described as inaugurating the field of concrete systems or "hypostatic" psychology, and opening new insights into integrative, synthetic and holistic studies of individual personality factors within a person. Also, some of his psychological works have been criticized for containing a large number of neologisms that make them difficult to understand, and for being "doomed to be incomplete". Țapu's model influenced another hypostatic approach to personality and counselling therapy, the propeller model approach for understanding the human being.

In his spiritual materialist writings, Țapu proposes a universal view of deity that even encompasses atheism, addressing controversial matters like guilt and euthanasia in short texts that read like poetry, and providing a provocative lifestyle perspective for people of all backgrounds. He explores the intersection of faith and material life in nonfiction philosophical ruminations containing nuanced reflections on what it means to be human, together with practical advice on ways to obtain “mind wholeness” in the chaos of modernity. His original thinking blends big ideas with practical implications, exploring questions of life, death, and the future. Reviewers compared the aphoristic style of Tapu to that of the ancient sacred texts, Jesus, Gandhi, the Sufi mystics, Jodorowsky, and Chopra.

== Awards and accolades ==
- Țapu was featured in the Anthology of Contemporary Romanian Aphorism (2017).
- In 2022, Țapu won first prize at the International Aphorism Festival in Tecuci.
- In 2024, he was invited to became an international affiliate member of the American Psychological Association.

== Bibliography ==
Title	Publication date	Publisher	Place of publication	ISBN / ISSN
Fundamente pentru o psihologie a cuplurilor functionale / Basic principles for a psychology of functional couples, PsycINFO: 2002-13017-004	2000	Revista de psihologie, Romanian Academy, 3-4, pp. 191–197	Bucharest (Romania)	ISSN 0034-8759
Romanian: Psihologie operatorie: teorie, evaluare, terapie (Operational psychology: theory, assessment, therapy)	2000	Premier	Ploieşti (Romania)	ISBN 973-80-30-22-6
Hypostatic Personality: Psychopathology of Doing and Being Made, LCCN 2002-446369 · SUDOC: 159011973 · ICCU: IT\ICCU\CFI\0955702	2001	Premier	Ploieşti (Romania)	ISBN 973-8030-59-5
Romanian: Dicţionar de psihologie şi psihopatologie: concepte actuale (Dictionary of psychology and psychopathology: current concepts)	2003	Premier	Ploieşti (Romania)	ISBN 973-8451-13-2
Romanian: Tratat de psihologie umanistă sistemică: de la diagnostic la statistică (Textbook of humanistic-systemic psychology: from diagnosis to statistics)	2006	Premier	Ploieşti (Romania)	ISBN 978-973-740-041-3
A humanistic model of burn-out syndrome rehabilitation in agritouristic settings	2007	Scientific Papers Series: Management, Economic Engineering in Agriculture and Rural Development, 7, pp. 507–510	Bucharest (Romania)	ISBN 978-973-8496-89-7
The Complete Guide to Relational Therapy	2011	Lulu	Raleigh, NC (United States)	ISBN 978-1-4478-5338-1
Învăţături despre a fi (Teachings on Being)	2016	Scrisul Românesc	Craiova (Romania)	ISBN 978-606-674-135-4
