= NLHS =

NLHS may refer to:

- New Lisbon High School, New Lisbon, Wisconsin, United States
- New London High School (disambiguation)
- Newfoundland and Labrador Health Services
- North Laurel High School, London, Kentucky, United States
- North Lincoln High School, Lincolnton, North Carolina, United States
- Northern Lehigh High School, Slatington, Pennsylvania, United States
- Northland Lutheran High School, Kronenwetter, Wisconsin, United States
- National Neili Senior High School, Chungli, Taoyuan, Taiwan
