= Changxin =

Changxin may refer to:

- Zhang Changxin (died 1990), champion boxer in Shanghai
- ChangXin Memory Technologies, a Chinese semiconductor integrated device manufacturer
- Changxin palace lantern, Chinese national treasure

== See also ==
- Changxing (disambiguation)
- Changting (disambiguation)
