= Changxing Island =

Changxing Island (Chinese: t 長興島, s 长兴岛, p Chángxīng Dǎo, lit. "Long-Happy Island") may refer to:

- Changxing Island, Shanghai, in the Yangtze River estuary
- Changxing Island, Dalian

== See also ==
- Changxing (disambiguation)
