= Lantern =

Portable lighting device

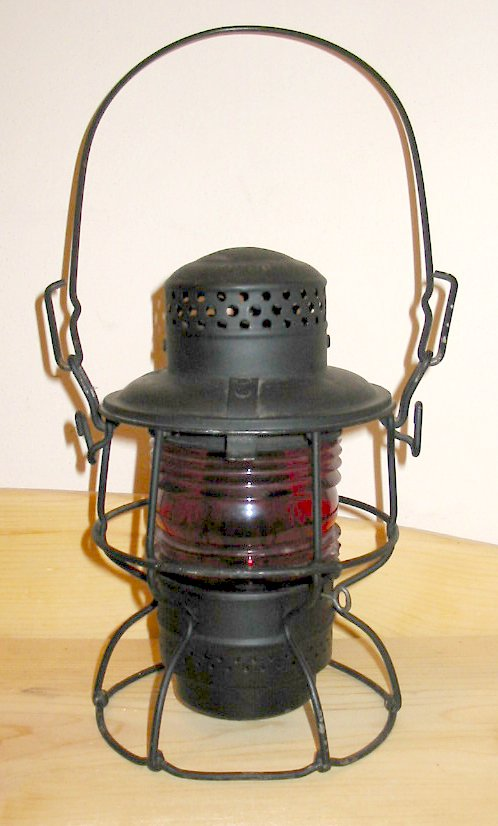
A railroad brakeman's signal lantern, fueled by kerosene.

A lantern is a source of lighting, often portable. It typically features a protective enclosure for the light source – historically usually a candle, a wick in oil, or a heated mesh, and often a battery-powered light in modern times – to make it easier to carry and hang up, and make it more reliable outdoors or in drafty interiors. Lanterns may also be used for signaling, as torches, or as general light-sources outdoors.

== Uses ==
The lantern enclosure was primarily used to prevent a burning candle or wick being extinguished by wind, rain or other causes. Some antique lanterns have only a metal grid, indicating their function was to protect the candle or wick during transportation and avoid excess heat from the top of the lantern.

Another important function was to reduce the risk of fire should a spark leap from the flame or the light be dropped. This was especially important below deck on ships: a fire on a wooden ship was a major catastrophe. Use of unguarded lights was taken so seriously that obligatory use of lanterns below deck, rather than unprotected flames, was written into one of the few known remaining examples of a pirate code, on pain of severe punishment.

Lanterns may also be used for signaling. In naval operations, ships used lights to communicate at least as far back as the Middle Ages; the use of a lantern that blinks code to transmit a message dates to the mid-1800s. In railroad operations, lanterns have multiple uses. Permanent lanterns on poles are used to signal trains about the operational status of the track ahead, sometimes with color gels in front of the light to signify stop, etc. Historically, a flagman at a level crossing used a lantern to stop cars and other vehicular traffic before a train arrived. Lanterns also provided a means to signal from train-to-train or from station-to-train.

A "dark lantern" was a candle lantern with a sliding shutter so that a space could be conveniently made dark without extinguishing the candle. For example, in the Sherlock Holmes story "The Red-Headed League", the detective and police make their way down to a bank vault by lantern light but then put a 'screen over that dark lantern' in order to wait in the dark for thieves to finish tunnelling. This type of lantern could also preserve the light source for sudden use when needed. A similar lantern with one or more sides of bulging glass was known as a "bull's-eye lantern".

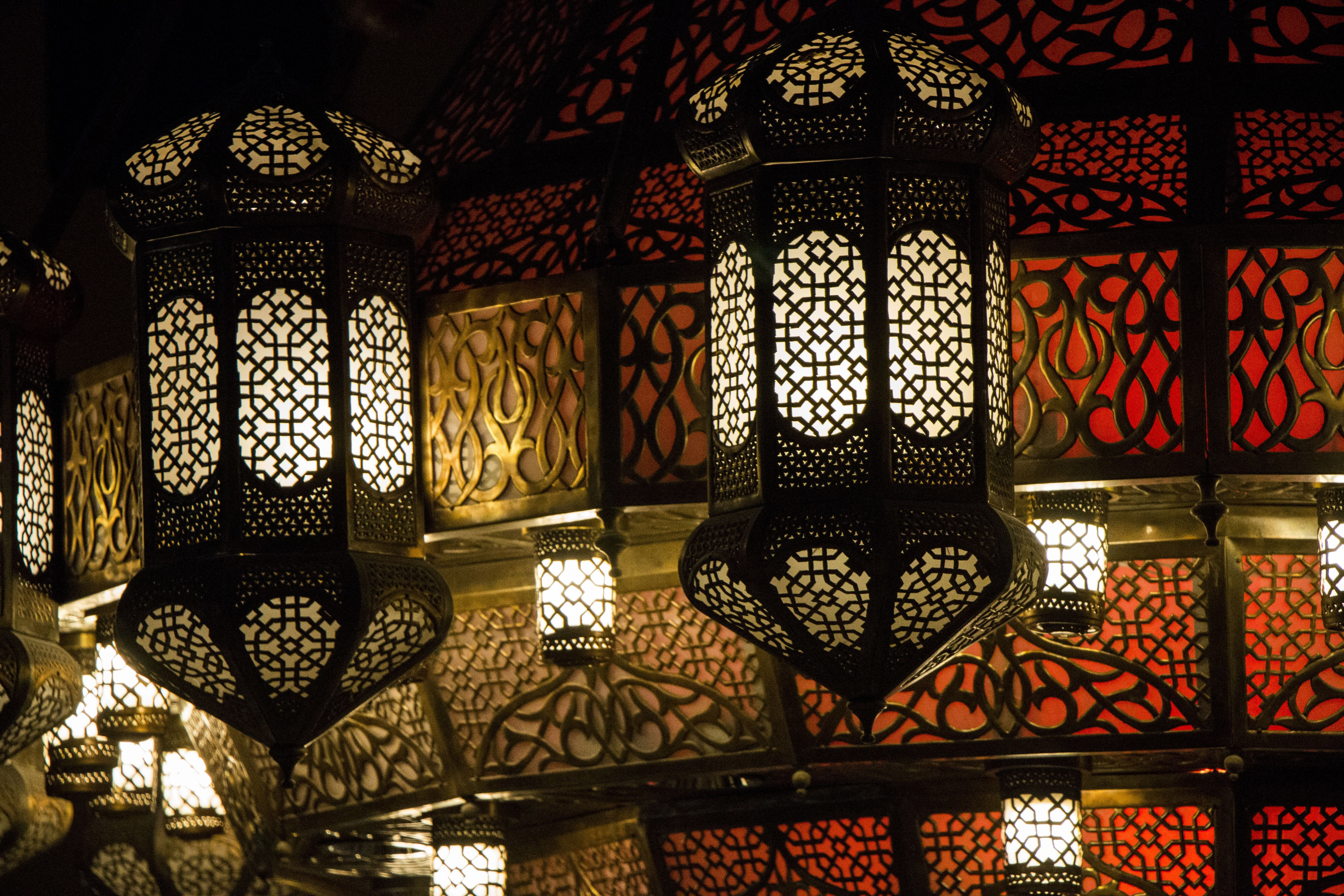
Arabic style lanterns (fanous), symbolic in the Islamic month of Ramadan

Lanterns may be used in religious observances. In the Eastern Orthodox Church, lanterns are used in religious processions and liturgical entrances, usually coming before the processional cross. Lanterns are also used to transport the Holy Fire from the Church of the Holy Sepulchre on Great Saturday during Holy Week.

Lanterns are used in many Asian festivals. During the Ghost Festival, lotus shaped lanterns are set afloat in rivers and seas to symbolically guide the lost souls of forgotten ancestors to the afterlife. During the Lantern Festival, the displaying of many lanterns is still a common sight on the 15th day of the first lunar month throughout China. During other Chinese festivities, kongming lanterns (sky lanterns) can be seen floating high into the air. However, some jurisdictions, such as in Canada, some states in the U.S., and parts of India, as well as some organizations, ban the use of sky lanterns because of concerns about fire and safety.

The term "lantern" can be used more generically to mean a light source, or the enclosure for a light source, even if it is not portable. Decorative lanterns exist in a wide range of designs. Some hang from buildings, such as street lights enclosed in glass panes. Others are placed on or just above the ground; low-light varieties can function as decoration or landscape lighting and can be a variety of colors and sizes. The housing for the top lamp and lens section of a lighthouse may be called a lantern.

== Etymology ==
The word lantern comes via French from Latin lanterna meaning "lamp, torch," possibly itself derived from Greek. An alternate historical spelling was "lanthorn", possibly derived from the ancient use of animal horn to cover window apertures, but allow in light. A lanthorn might have been significantly larger and brighter than a lantern.

== Construction ==
Lanterns were usually made from a metal frame with several sides (usually four, but up to eight) or round, commonly with a hook or a hoop of metal on top. Windows of some translucent material may be fitted in the sides; these are now usually glass or plastic but formerly were thin sheets of animal horn, or tinplate punched with holes or decorative patterns.

Paper lanterns are made in societies around the world.

A lantern generally contains a burning light source: a candle, liquid oil with a wick, or gas with a mantle. The ancient Chinese sometimes captured fireflies in transparent or semi-transparent containers and used them as (short-term) lanterns, and use of fireflies in transparent containers was also a widespread practice in ancient India; however, since these were short-term solutions, the use of fire torches was more prevalent.

Modern varieties often place an electric light in a decorative glass case.

== History ==
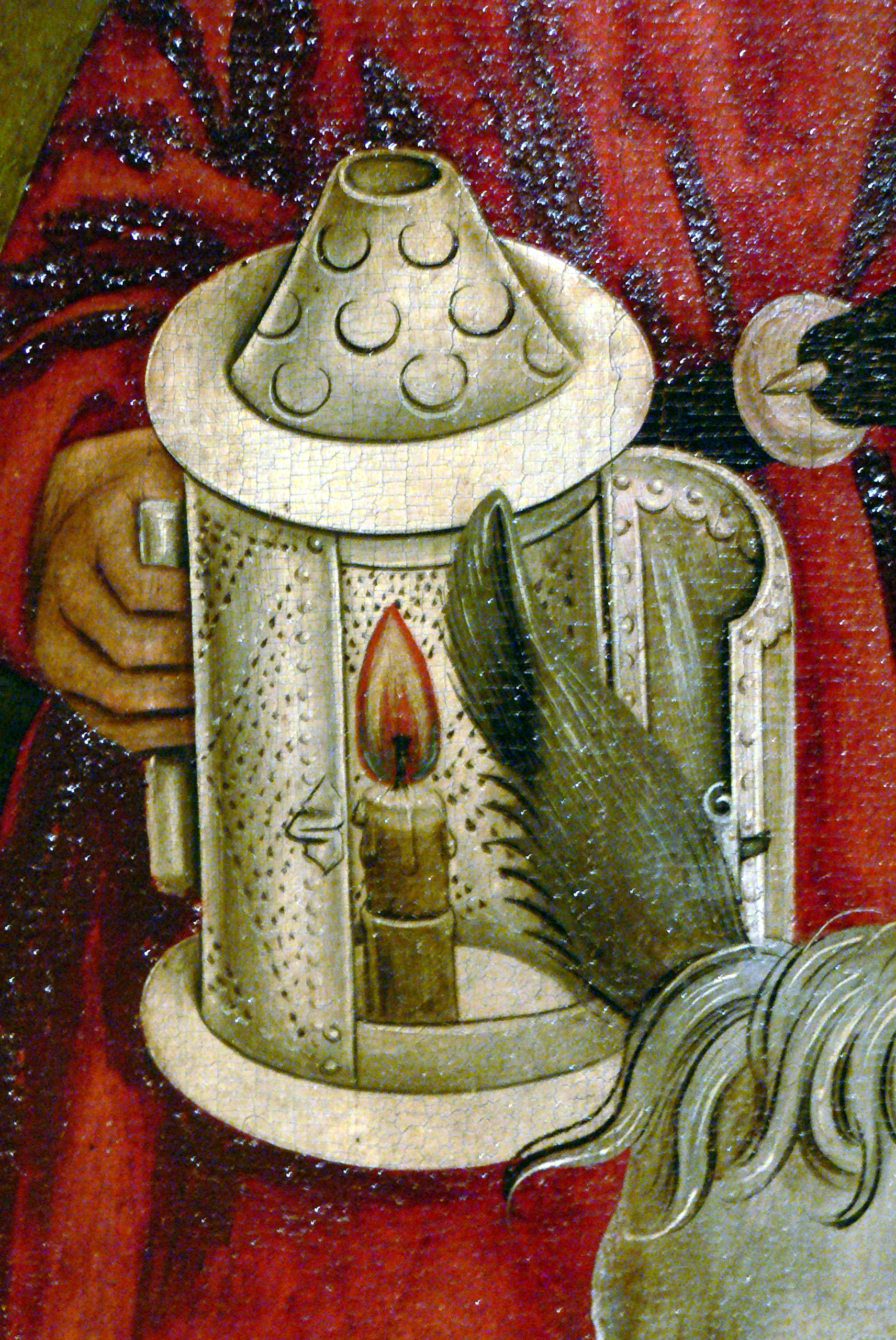
15th-century candle lantern from Germany, perforated metal

In 1417, the Mayor of London ordered that all homes must hang lanterns outdoors after nightfall during the winter months. This marked the first organized public street lighting. Lanterns have been used functionally, for light rather than decoration, since antiquity. Some used a wick in oil, while others were essentially protected candle-holders. Before the development of glass sheets, animal horns were scraped thin and flattened to create a translucent window.

Beginning in the Middle Ages, some towns hired watchmen to patrol the streets at night, as a crime deterrent, carrying lanterns or oil lamps against the darkness. The practice continued up through at least the 18th century.

In March 1764 and twice in October 1764, George Allsopp, a British-born Canadian, was arrested in Quebec for violating an order to carry lanterns during the night. There was violence every time he was arrested and Allsopp would denounce the military. In October he prosecuted the soldiers involved in his arrests. On April 18, 1775, Paul Revere's midnight ride took place after two lanterns were held up in the Old North Church to signal to revolutionaries in Charlestown that the British troops were crossing the Charles River to disarm the rebel colonial militias. The Battles of Lexington and Concord occurred the day after, on April 19, starting the American Revolution.

Public spaces became increasingly lit with lanterns in the 1500s, especially following the invention of lanterns with glass windows, which greatly improved the quantity of light. In 1588 the Parisian Parlement decreed that a torch be installed and lit at each intersection, and in 1594 the police changed this to lanterns. Beginning in 1667 during the reign of King Louis XIV, thousands of street lights were installed in Parisian streets and intersections. Under this system, streets were lit with lanterns suspended 20 yards (18 m) apart on a cord over the middle of the street at a height of 20 feet (6.1 m); as an English visitor described in 1698, 'The streets are lit all winter and even during the full moon!' In London, a diarist wrote in 1712 that ‘All the way, quite through Hyde Park to the Queen's Palace at Kensington, lanterns were placed for illuminating the roads on dark nights.’

== Modern lanterns ==
=== Fueled lanterns ===
All fueled lanterns are somewhat hazardous owing to the danger of handling flammable and toxic fuel, danger of fire or burns from the high temperatures involved, and potential dangers from carbon monoxide poisoning if used in an enclosed environment.

Simple wick lanterns remain available. They are cheap and durable and usually can provide enough light for reading. They require periodic trimming of the wick and regular cleaning of soot from the inside of the glass chimney.

Mantle lanterns use a woven ceramic impregnated gas mantle to accept and re-radiate heat as visible light from a flame. The mantle does not burn (but the cloth matrix carrying the ceramic must be "burned out" with a match prior to its first use). When heated by the operating flame the mantle becomes incandescent and glows brightly. The heat may be provided by a gas, by kerosene, or by a pressurized liquid such as "white gas", which is essentially naphtha. For protection from the high temperatures produced and to stabilize the airflow, a cylindrical glass shield called the globe or chimney is placed around the mantle.

Manually pressurized lanterns using white gas (also marketed as Coleman fuel or "Camp Fuel") are manufactured by the Coleman Company in one and two-mantle models. Some models are dual fuel and can also use gasoline. These are being supplanted by a battery-powered fluorescent lamp and LED models, which are safer in the hands of young people and inside tents. Liquid fuel lanterns remain popular where the fuel is easily obtained and in common use.

Many portable mantle-type fuel lanterns now use fuel gases that become liquid when compressed, such as propane, either alone or combined with butane. Such lamps usually use a small disposable steel container to provide the fuel. The ability to refuel without liquid fuel handling increases safety. Additional fuel supplies for such lamps have an indefinite shelf life if the containers are protected from moisture (which can cause corrosion of the container) and excess heat.

=== Electric lanterns ===
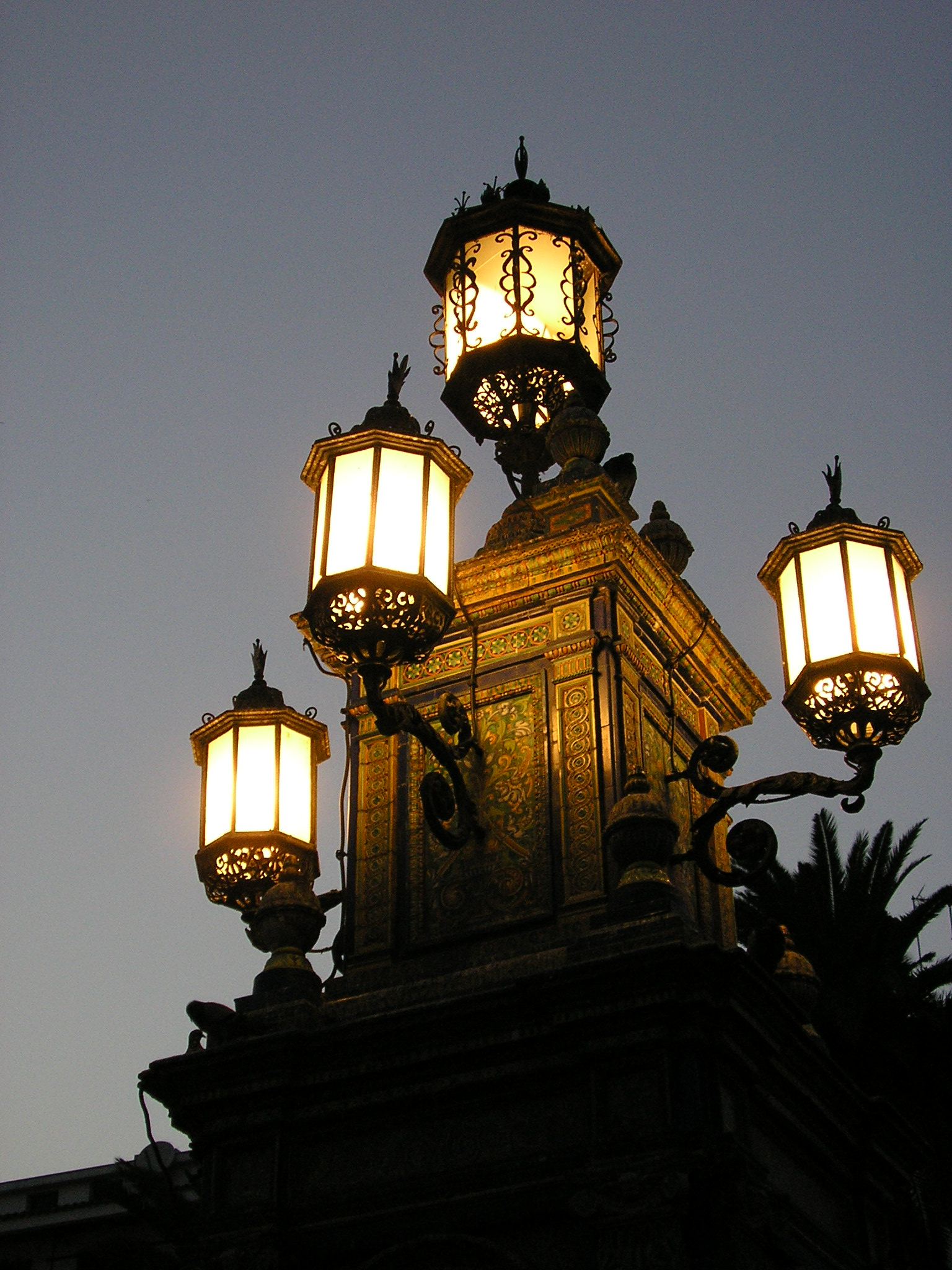
Street lanterns in Algeciras, Andalusia, Spain

Lanterns designed as permanently mounted electric lighting fixtures are used in interior, landscape, and civic lighting applications. Styles can evoke former eras, unify street furniture themes, or enhance aesthetic considerations. They are manufactured for use with various wired voltage supplies. Various battery types are used in portable light sources. They are more convenient, safer, and produce less heat than combustion lights. Solar-powered lanterns have become popular in developing countries, where they provide a safer and cheaper alternative to kerosene lamps. Lanterns utilizing LEDs are popular as they are more energy-efficient and rugged than other types, and prices of LEDs suitable for lighting have dropped. Some rechargeable fluorescent lanterns may be plugged in at all times and may be set up to illuminate upon a power failure, a useful feature in some applications. During extensive power failures (or for remote use), supplemental recharging may be provided from an automobile's 12-volt electrical system or from a modest solar-powered charger.

== Gallery ==
=== Hand-held lanterns ===
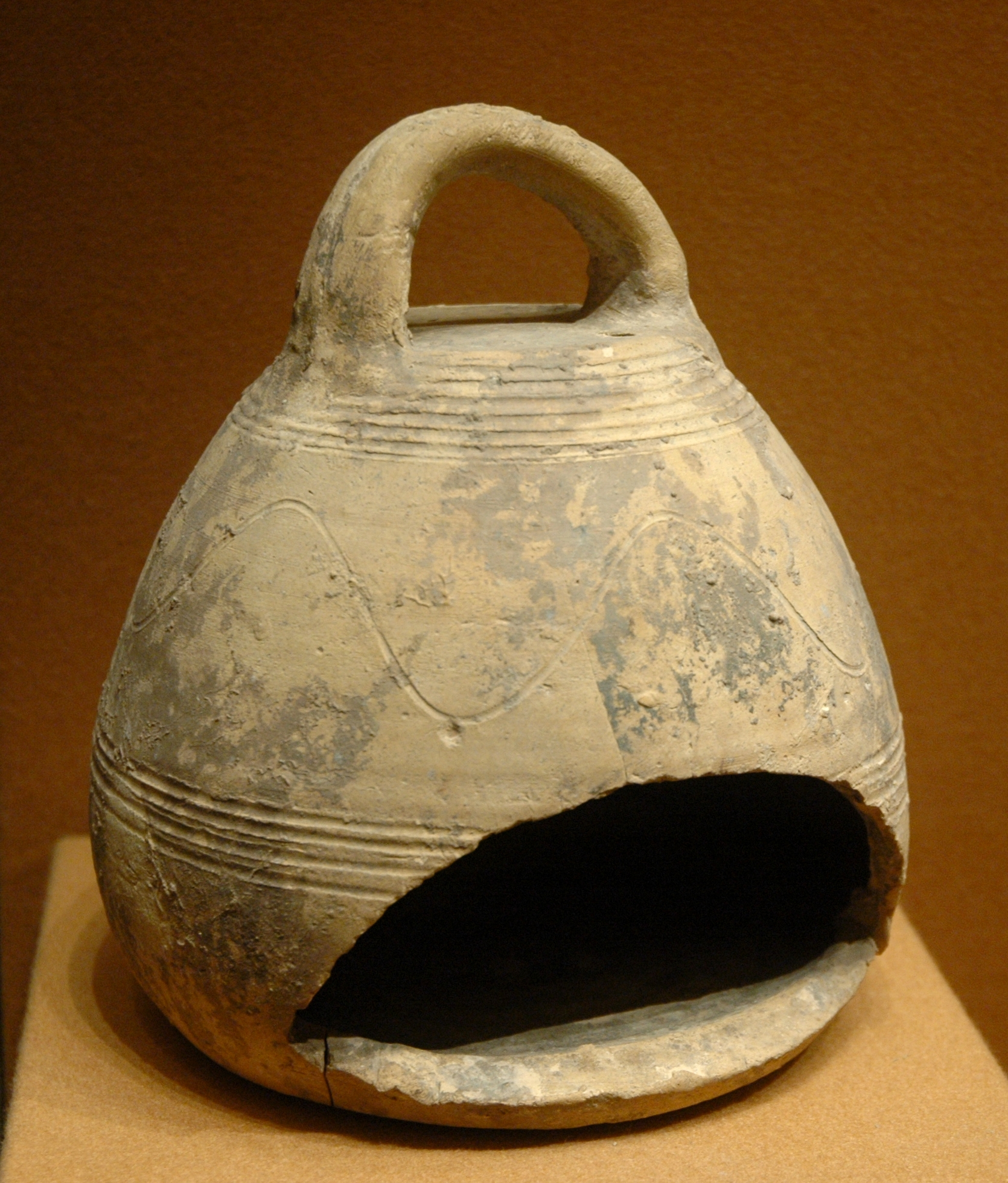
Terracotta lantern, early Islamic Era (8th-9th century), excavated c. 1931 in Susa (Shush), Iran

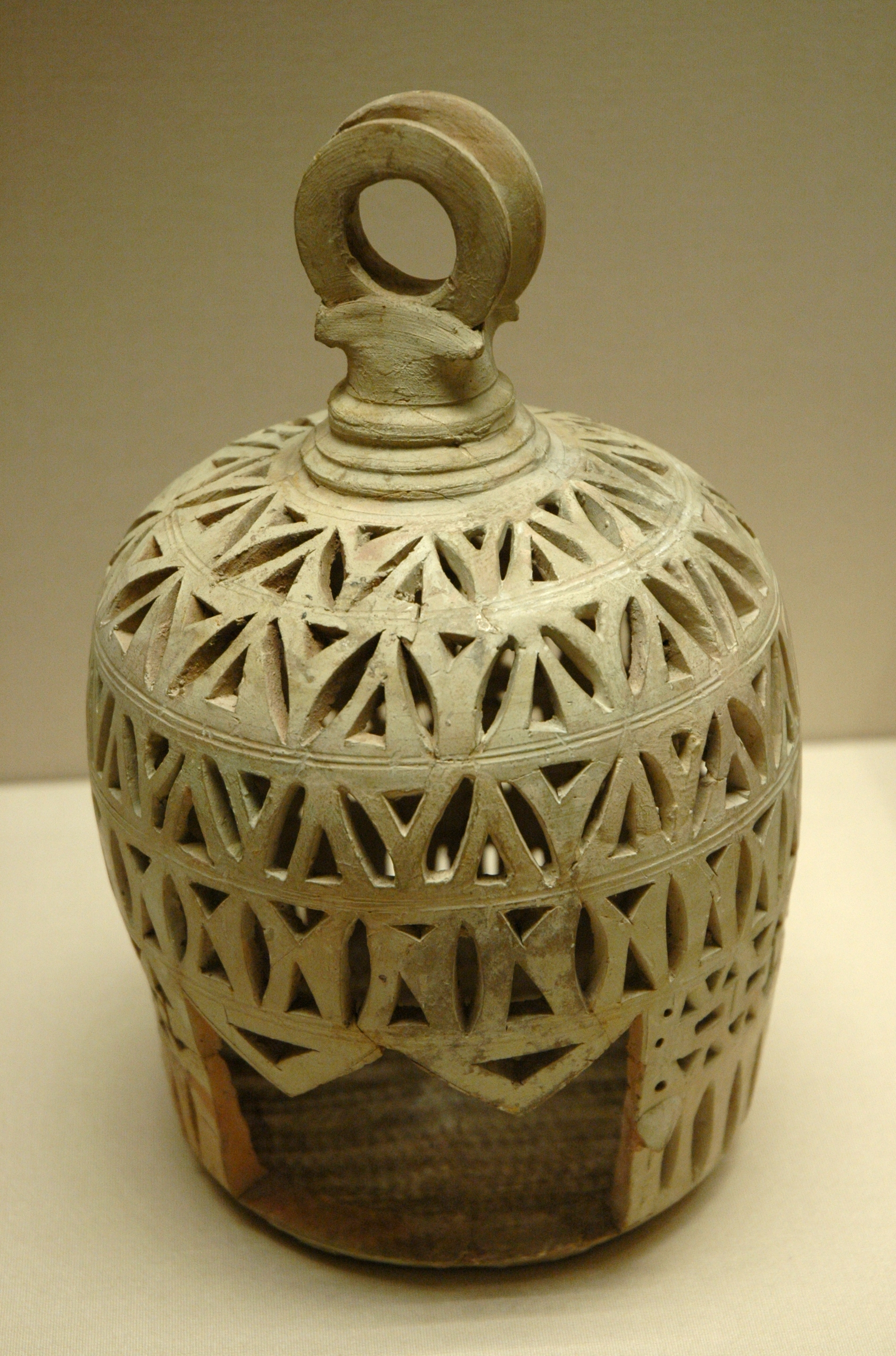
Openwork lantern for a lamp, 9th-10th century unglazed earthenware, excavated in Nishapur, Iran)

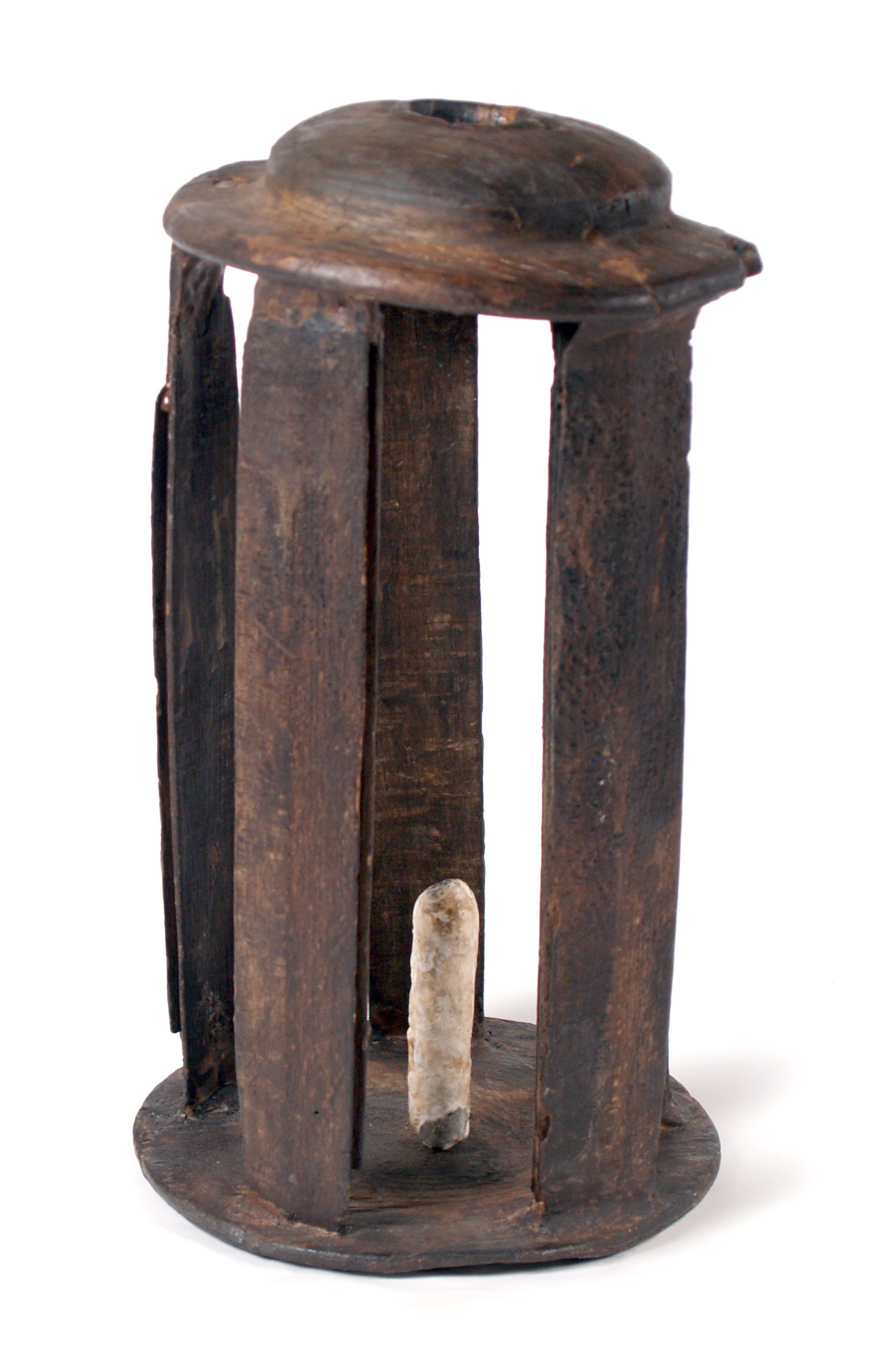
Iron ship lantern recovered from English carrack Mary Rose (16th century)

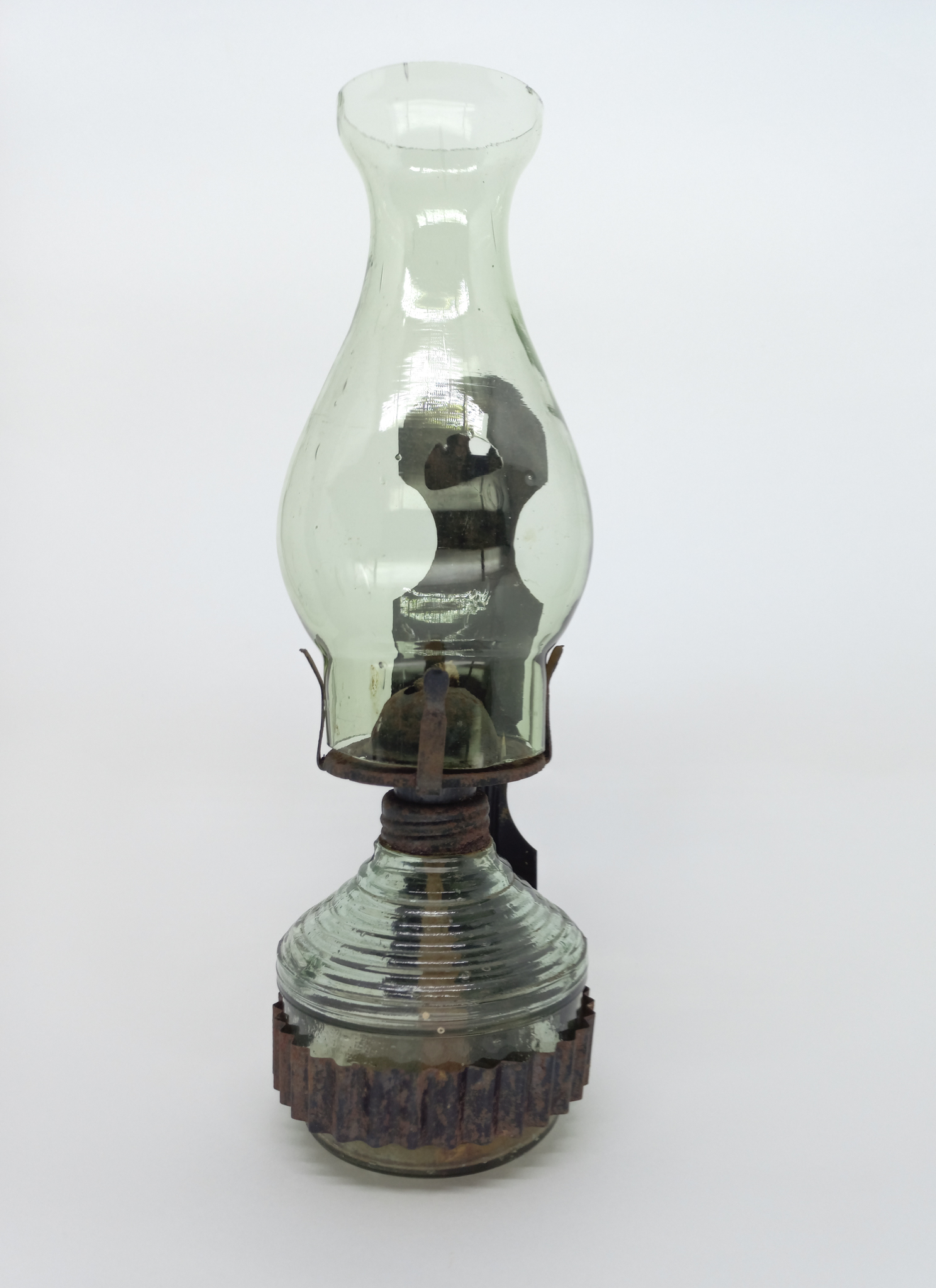
Lantern of metal and glass (Brazil, 19th century)

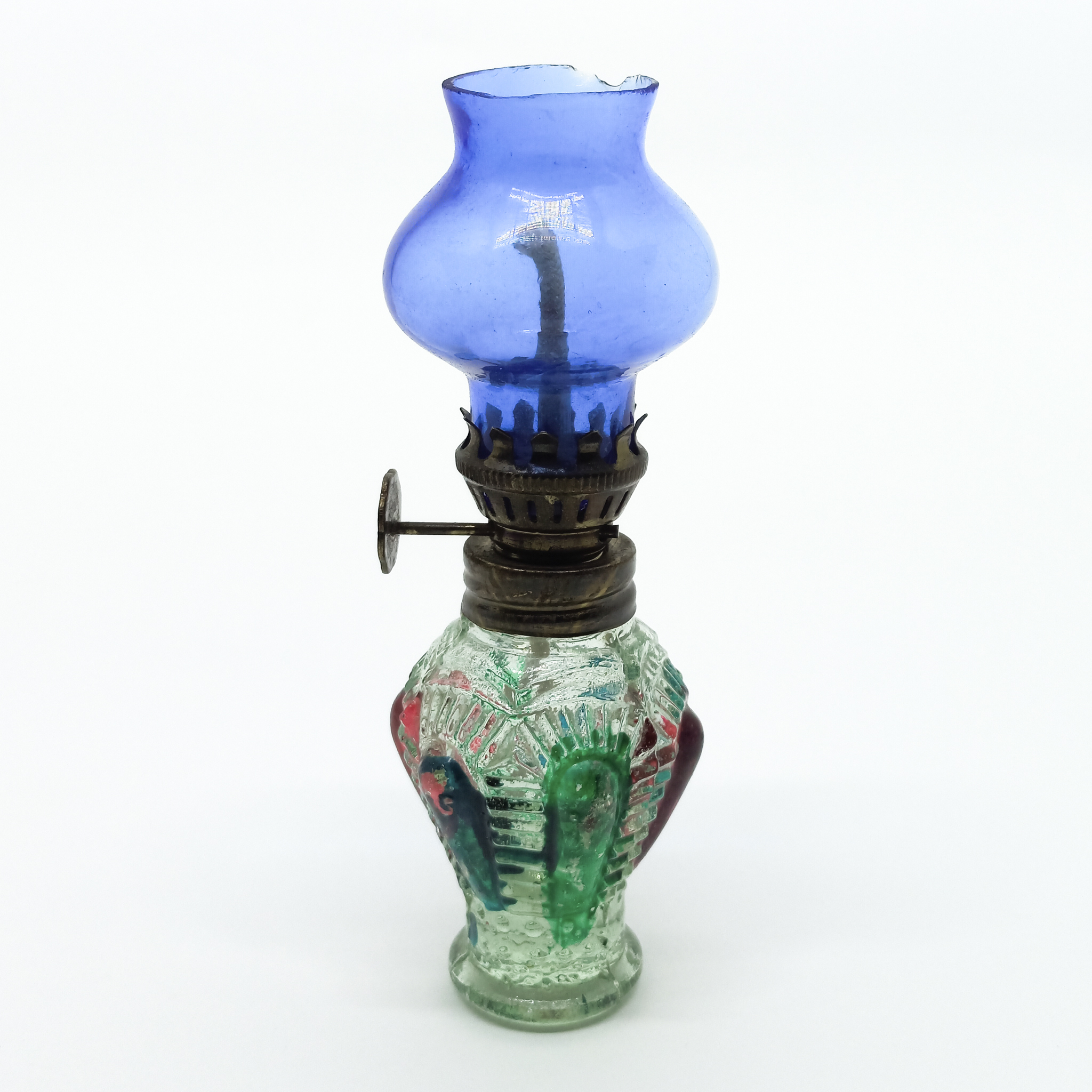
Miniature glass lamp (Brazil, 19th century)

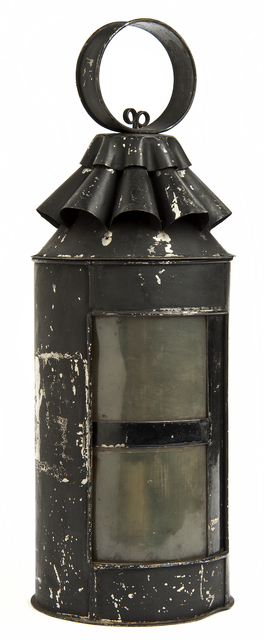
Tin lantern, candle for light, with horn windows (Minnesota, USA, c. 1863)

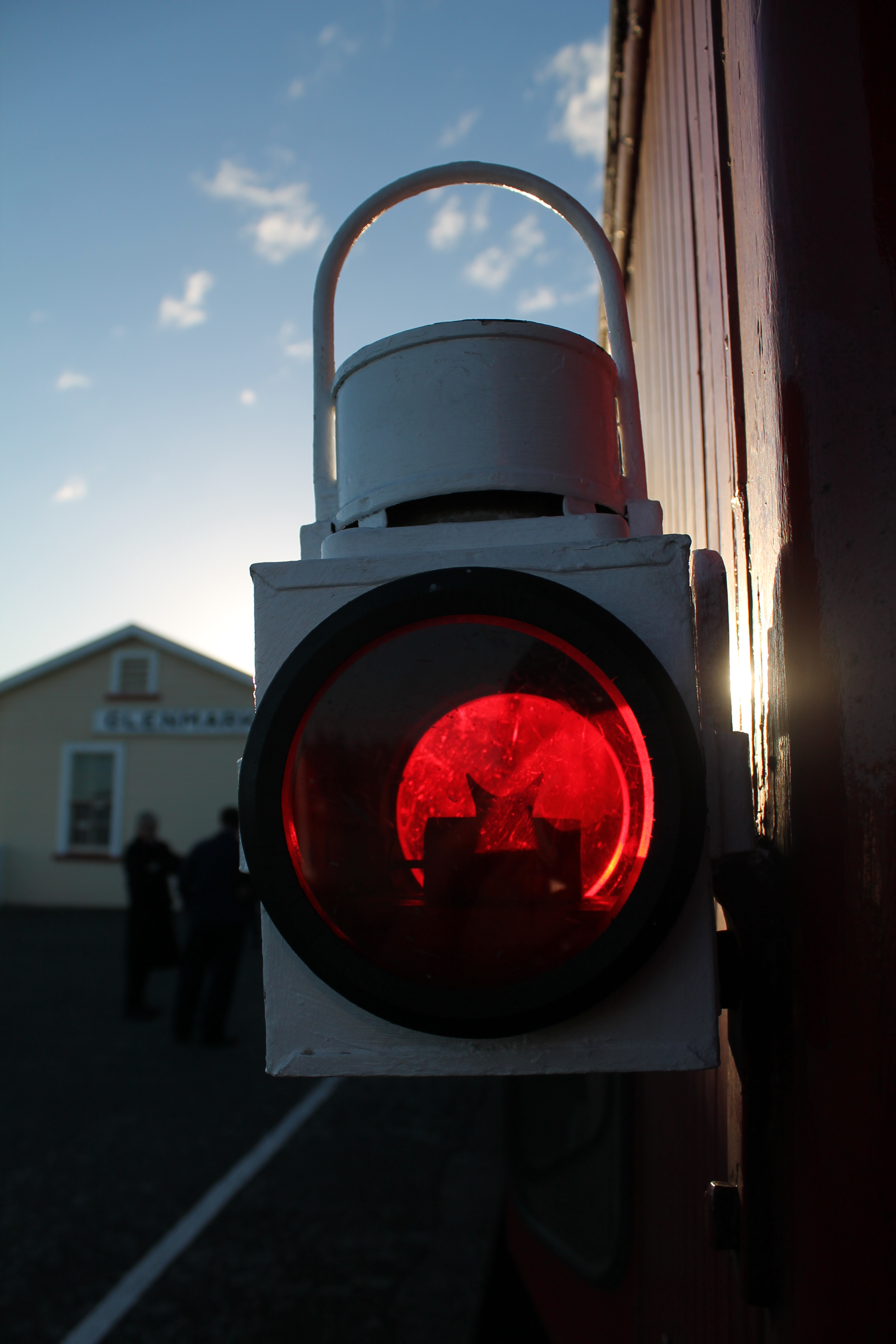
Lamp on the Weka Pass Railway, New Zealand

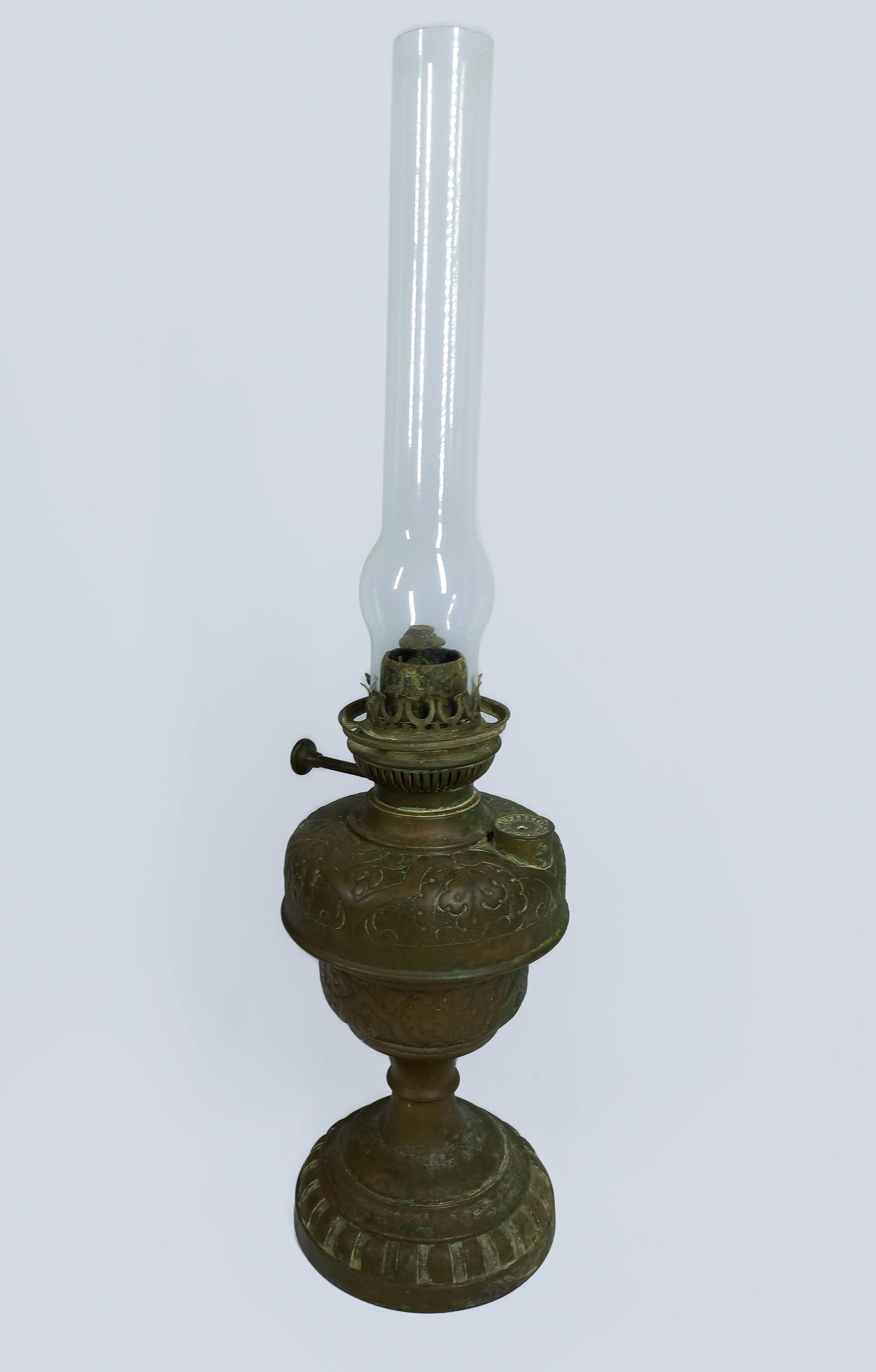
Metal and glass lantern, (Brazil, 20th century)

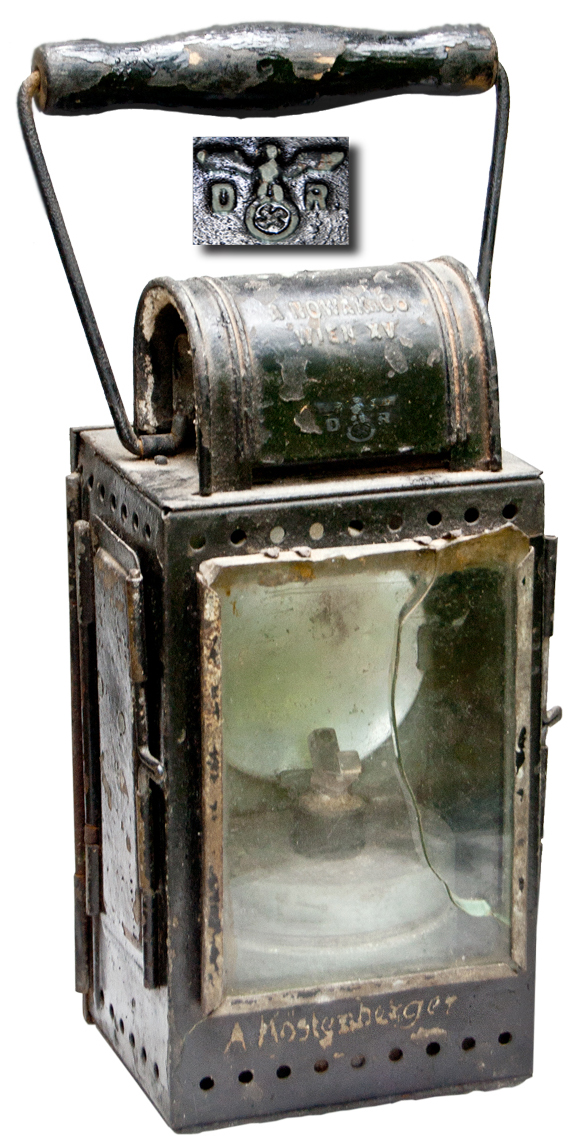
Brass carbide burner trainman's lantern, (German Reich Railway, c. 1942)

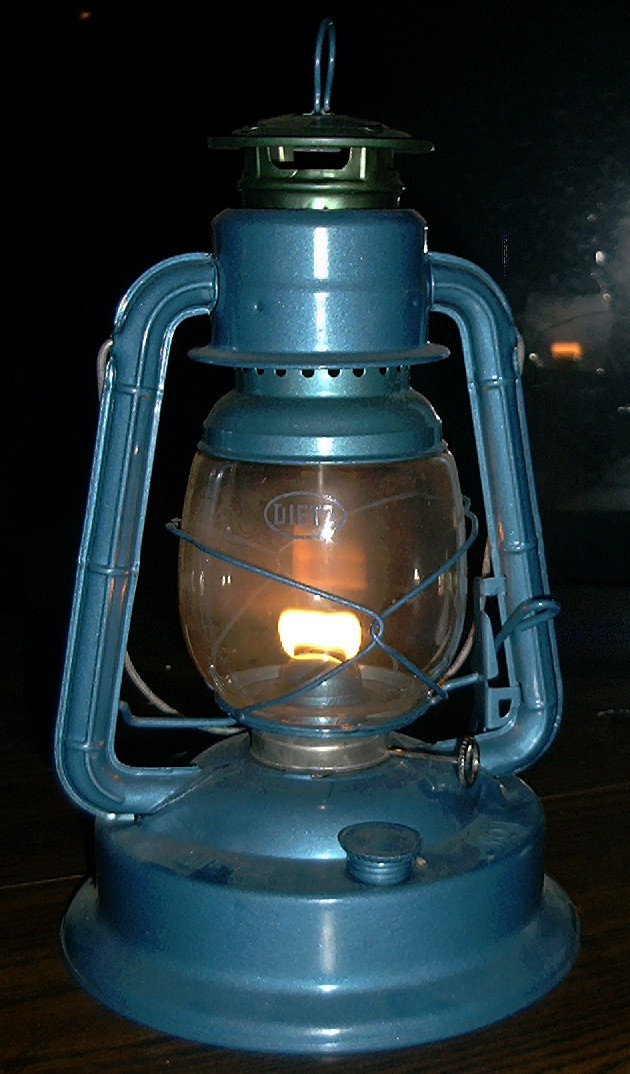
Modern Chinese-made RE Dietz "Little Wizard No. 1" kerosene lantern

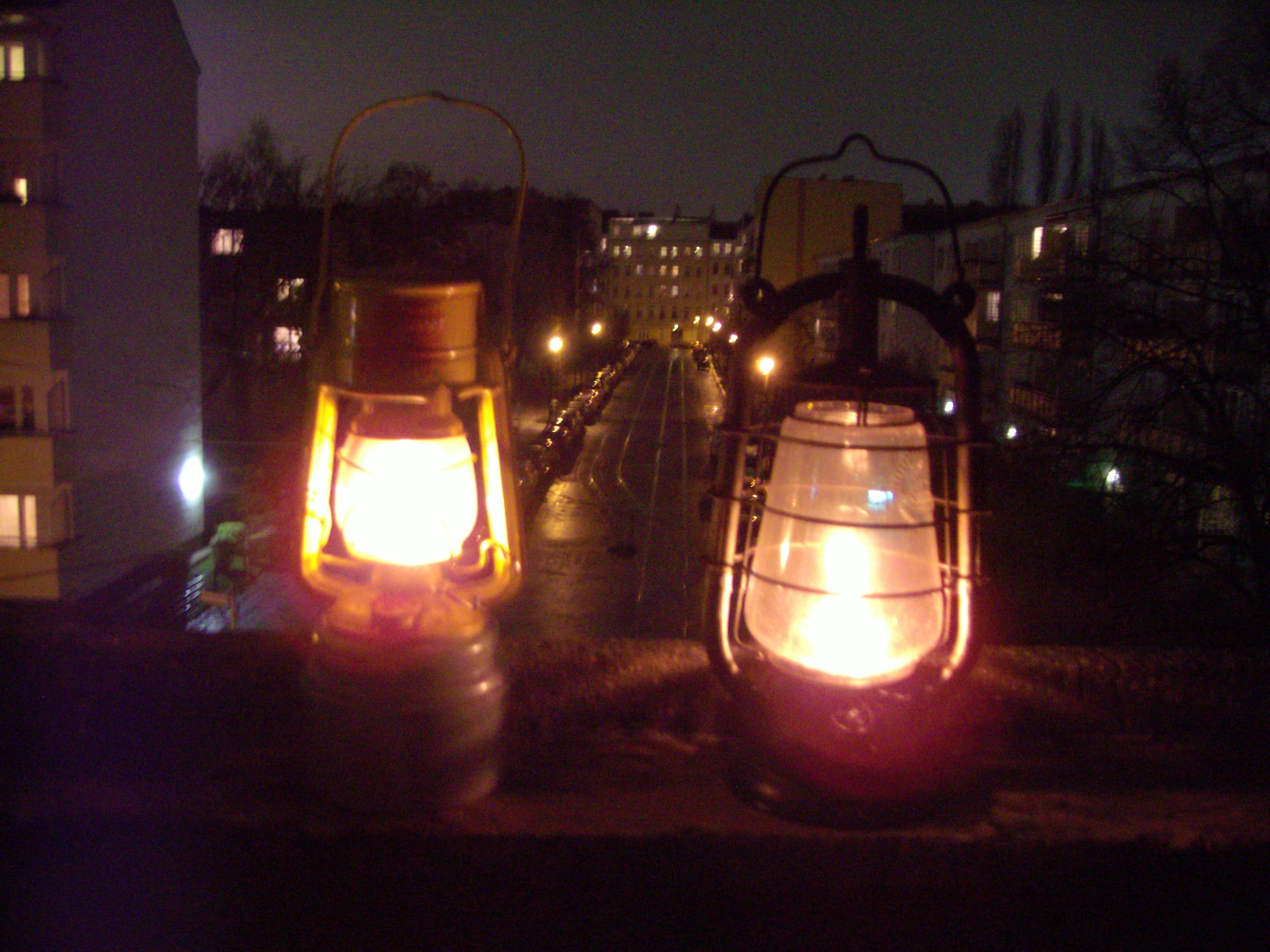
Two kerosene lanterns: mixed air on right and fresh air on left (Germany, 2010)

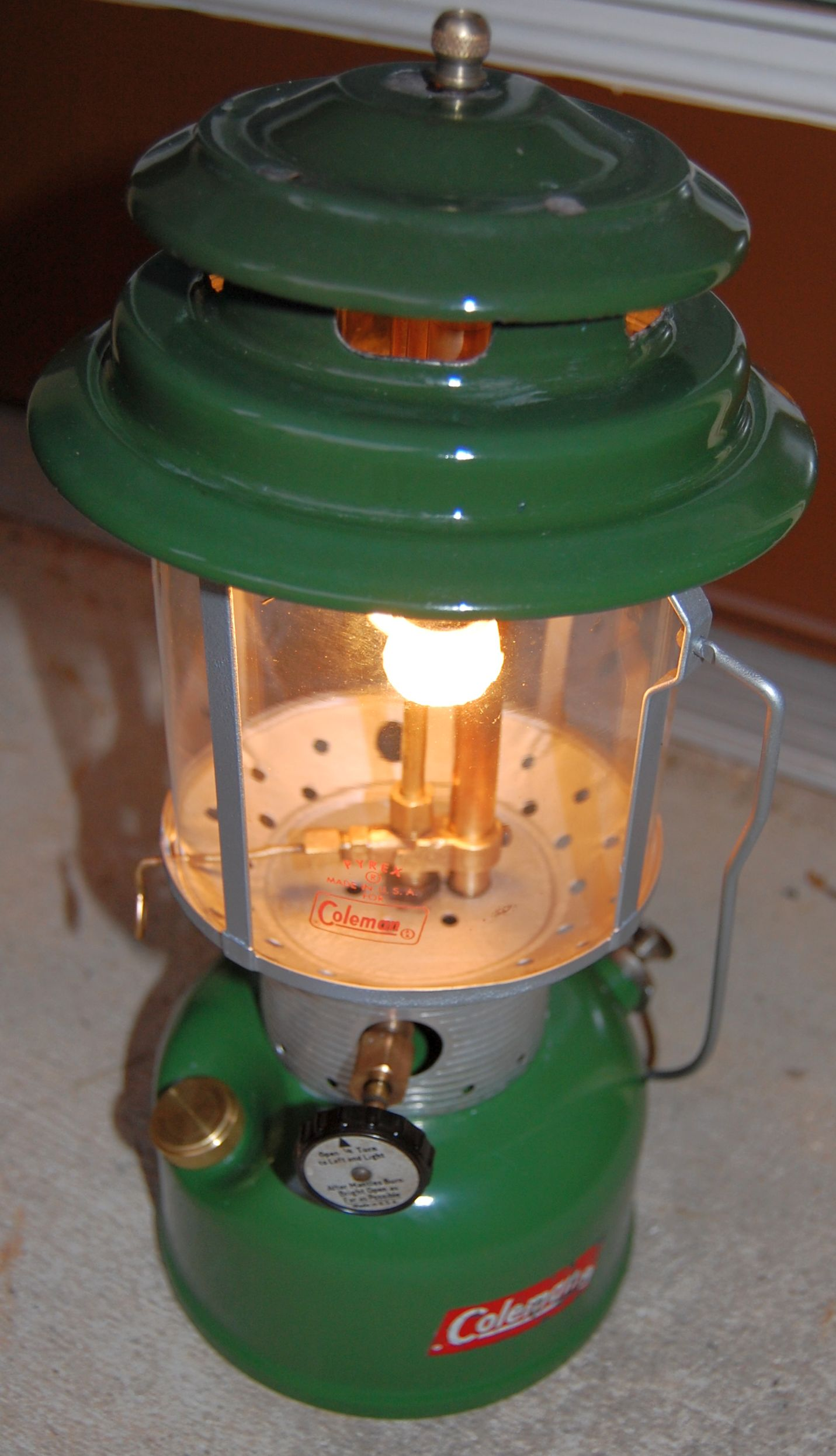
A fuel-burning Coleman lantern (England, 2012)

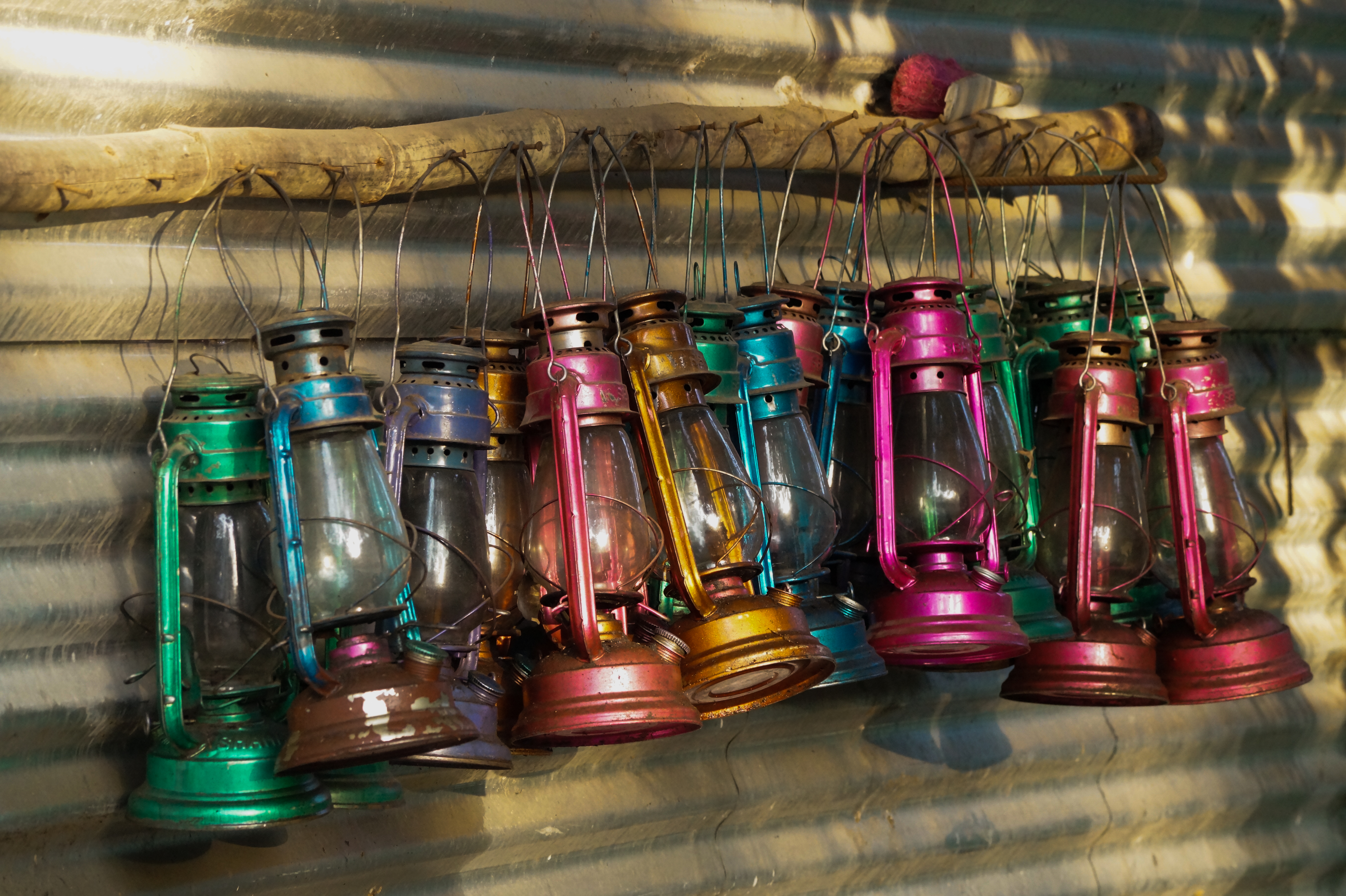
Lanterns in Rishikesh, India (2017)

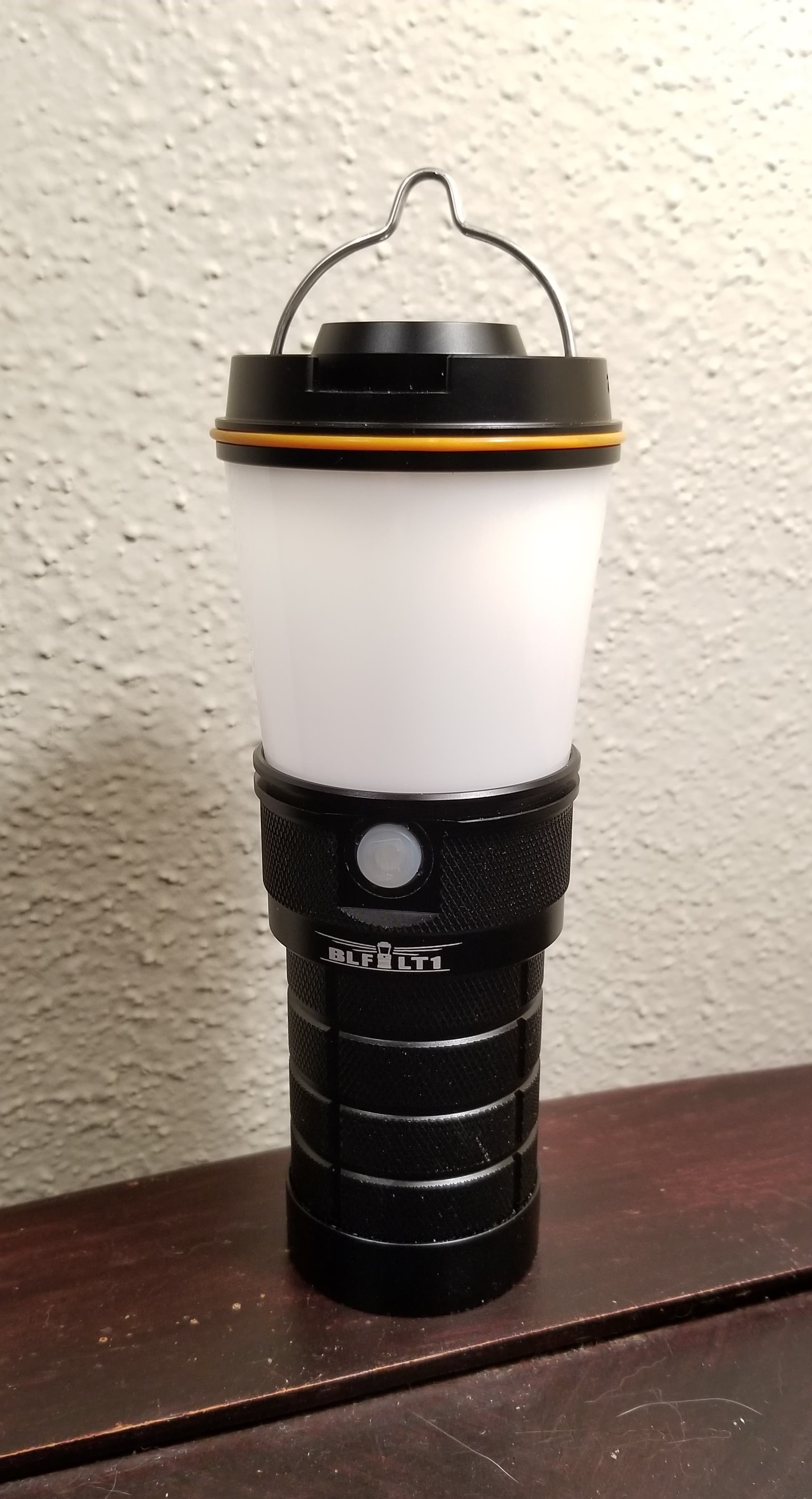
High-end LED lantern, powered by lithium-ion batteries, with modern features like a USB-C charging port and variable color temperature (2020)

=== Paper lanterns ===
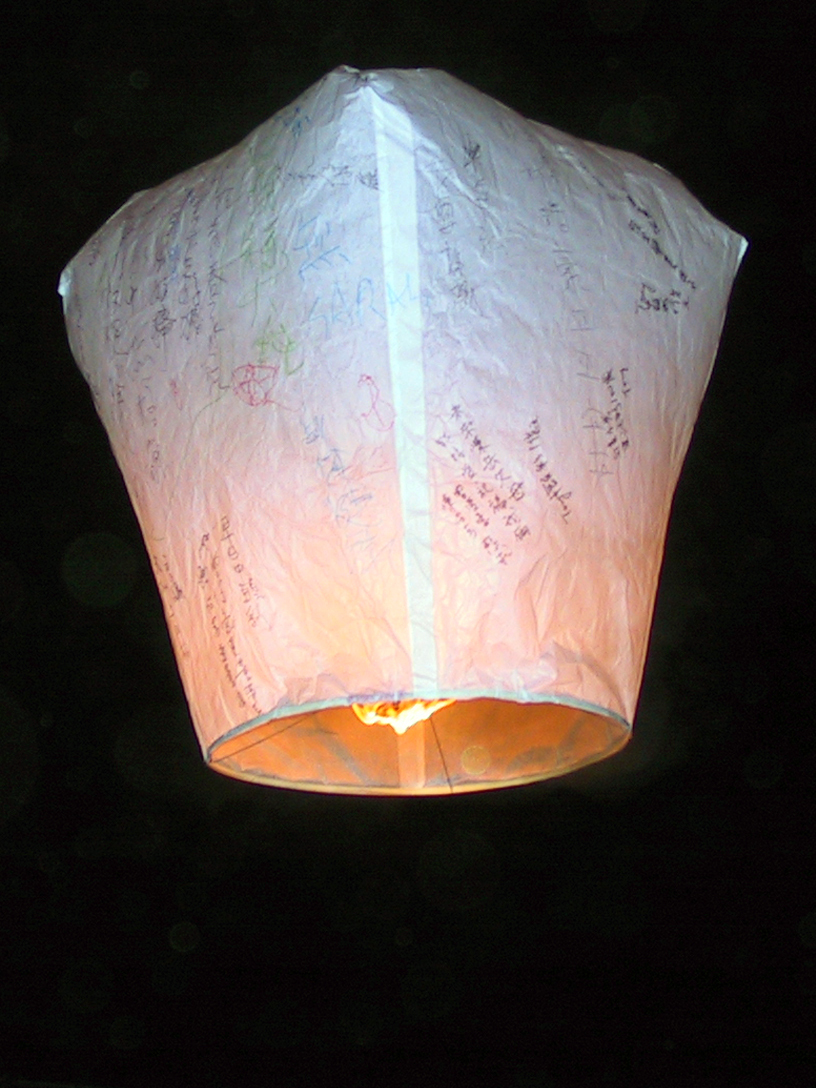
A modern Kǒngmíng lantern (Chinese)

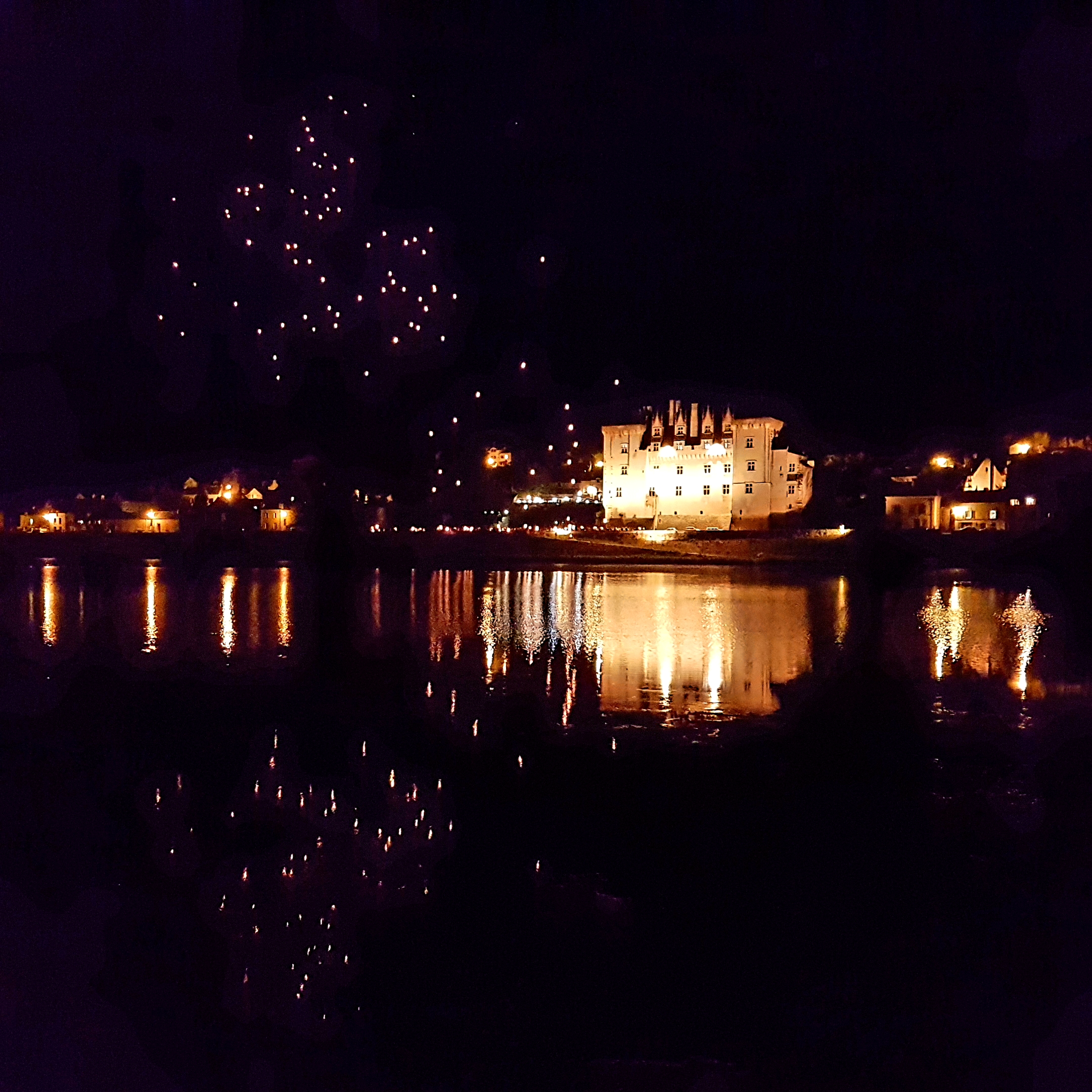
Sky lanterns, Château de Montsoreau-Museum of Contemporary Art, Loire Valley, France

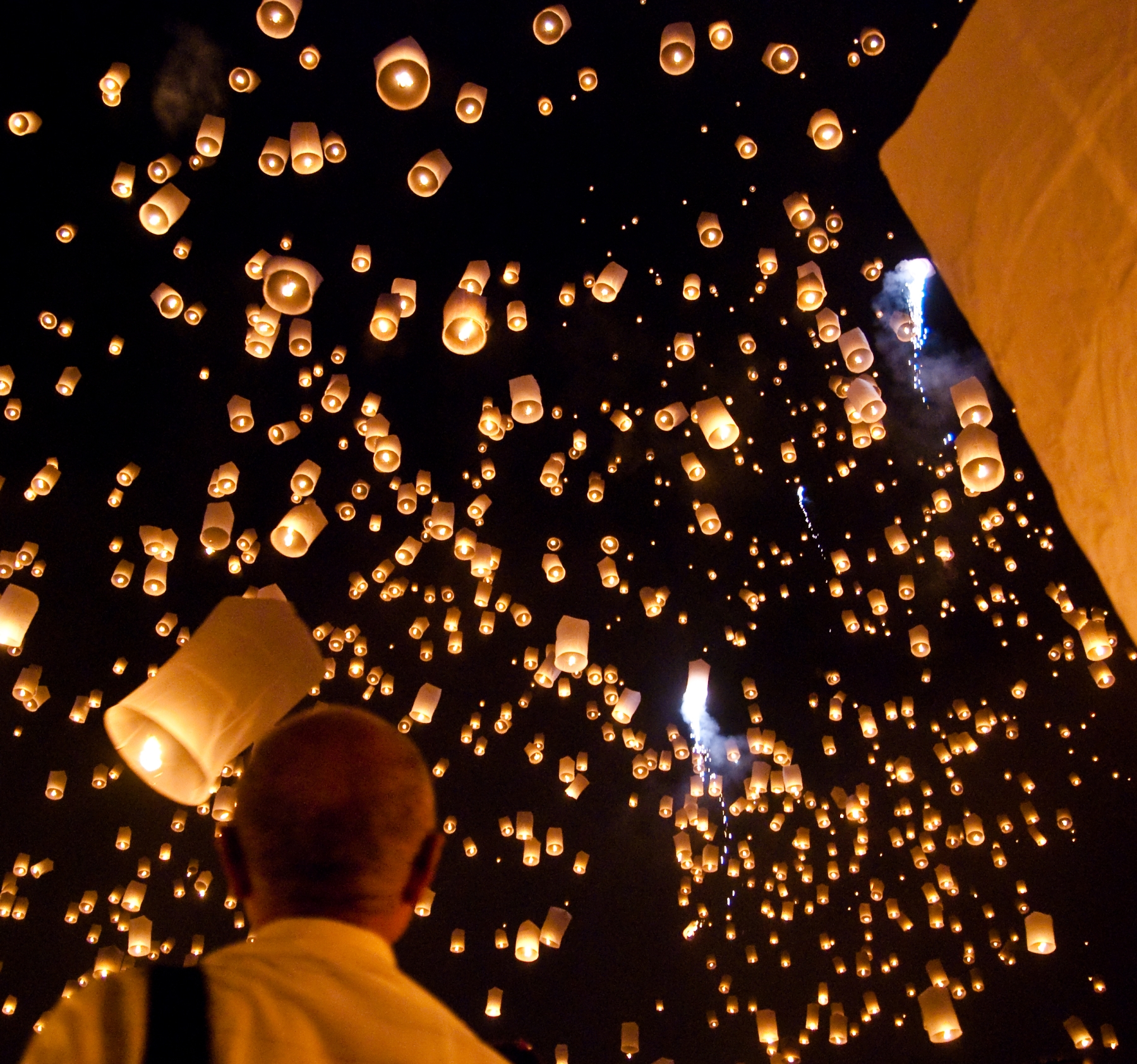
Yi Peng (Loi Krathong) festival in Tudongkasatan Lanna (Lanna Meditation Retreat Centre), Mae Jo Chiang Mai, Thailand

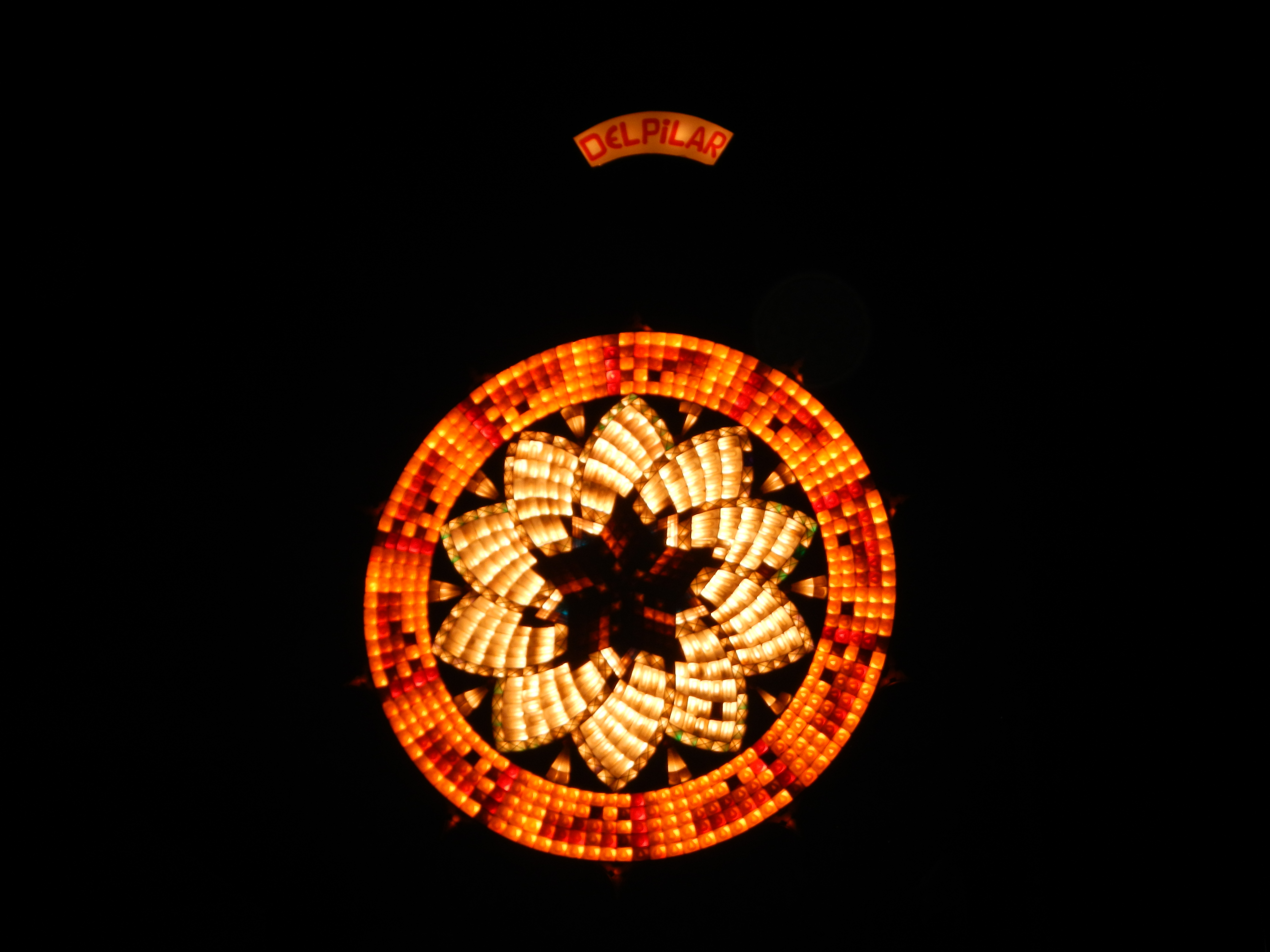
Barangay Del Pilar (2012 Grand Champion), Giant Lantern Festival, City of San Fernando, Philippines

=== Exterior lighting ===
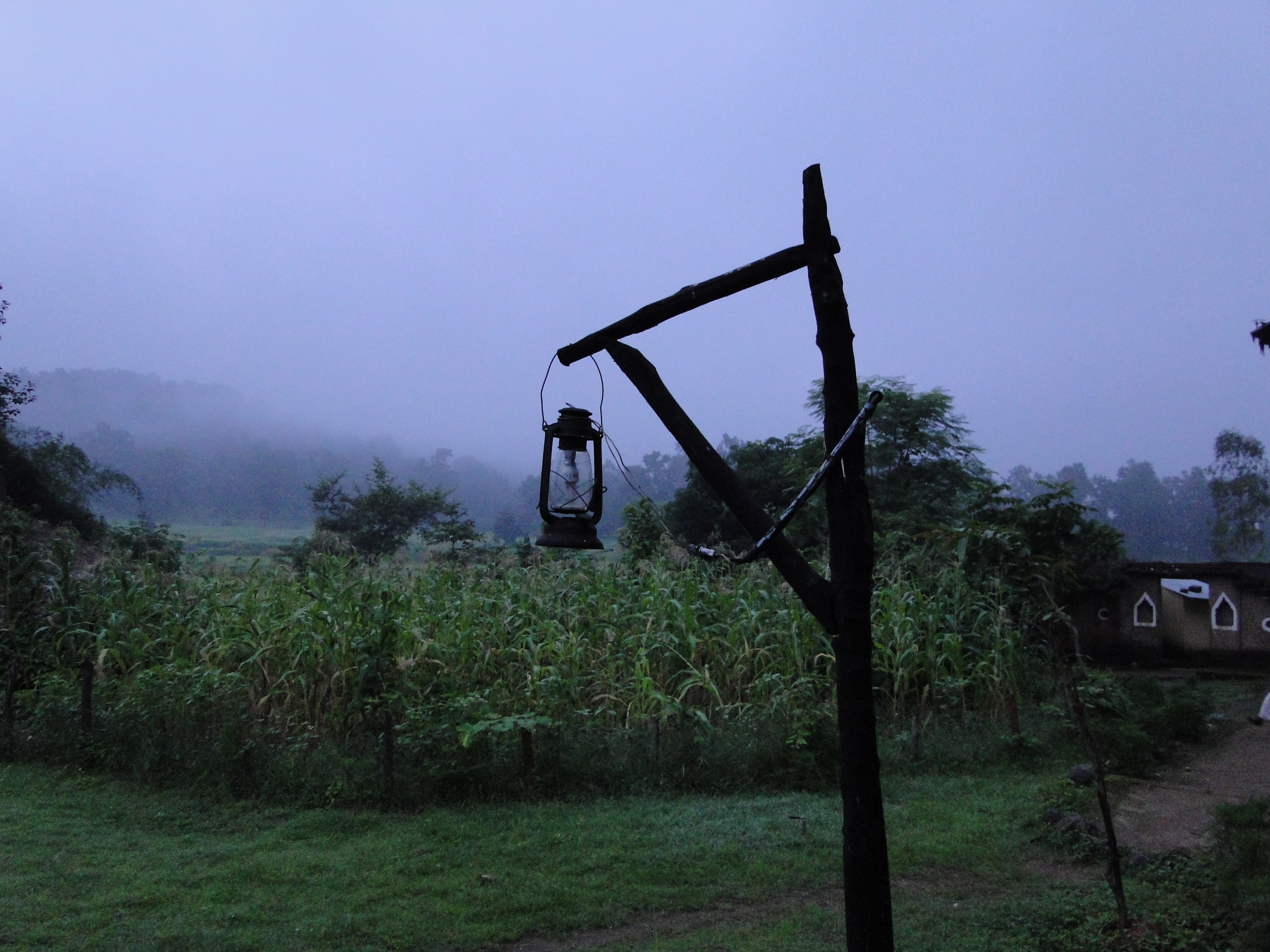
An electrically retrofitted lantern in use in rural Chhattisgarh, India

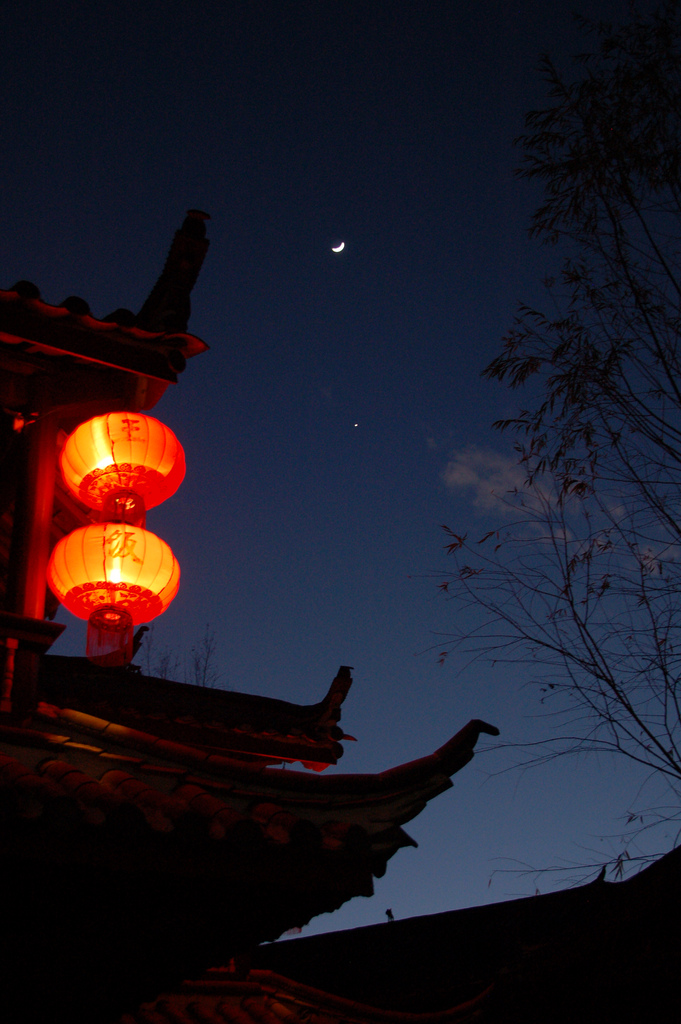
Palace lantern in the night sky of Lijiang, Yunnan, China

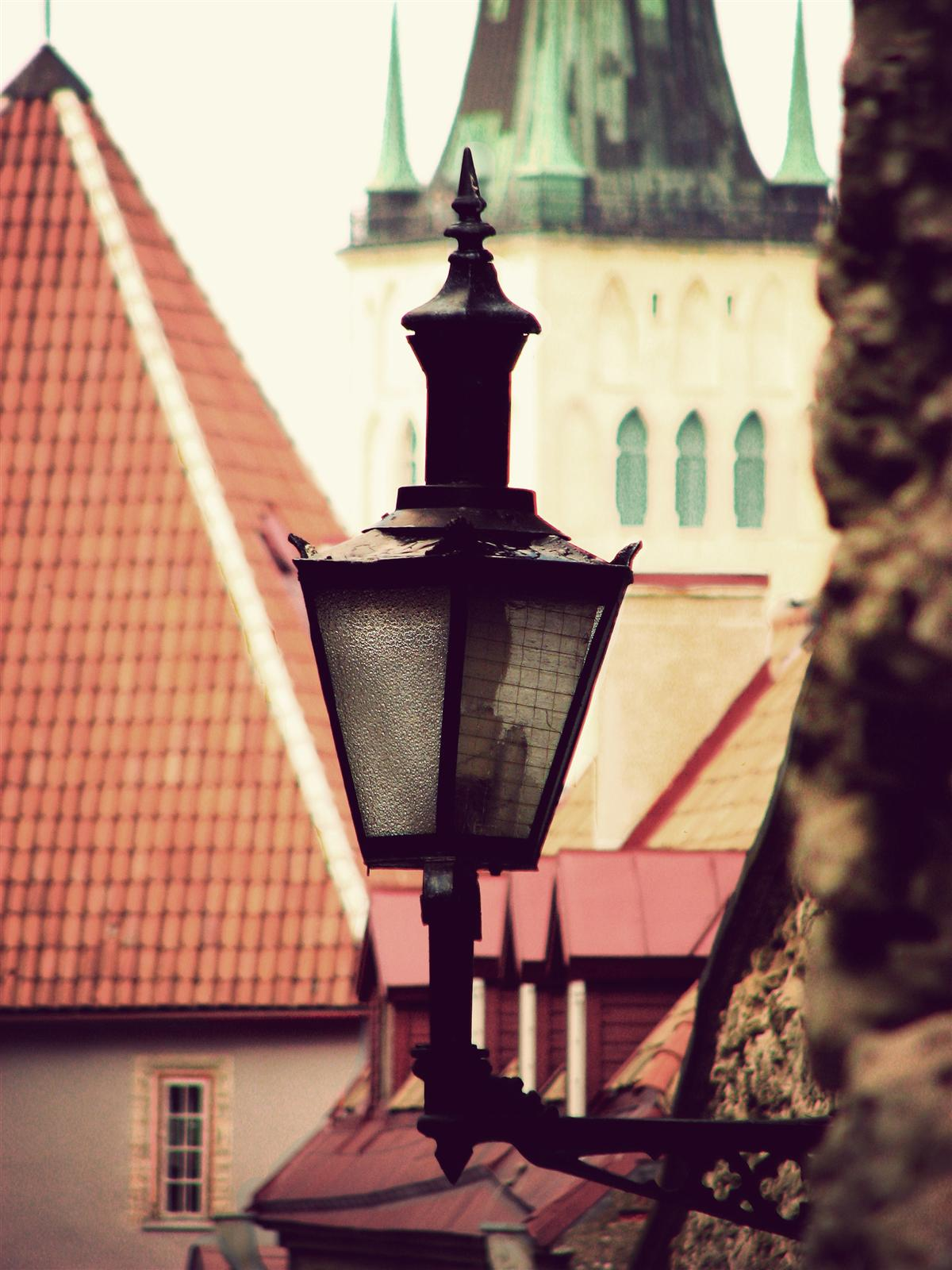
Traditional street lantern in the Old Town of Tallinn, Estonia

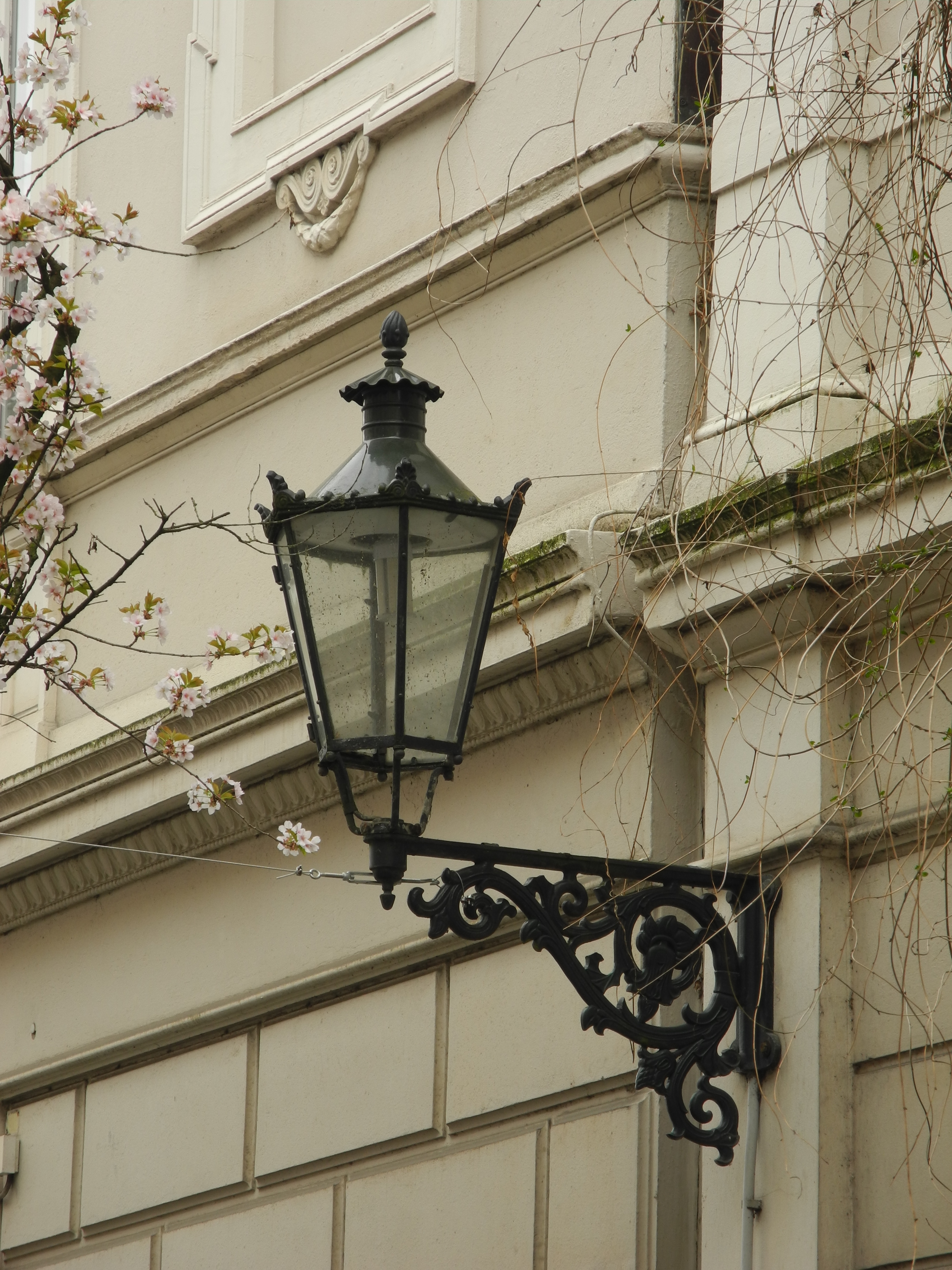
Lantern in Wuppertal, Germany

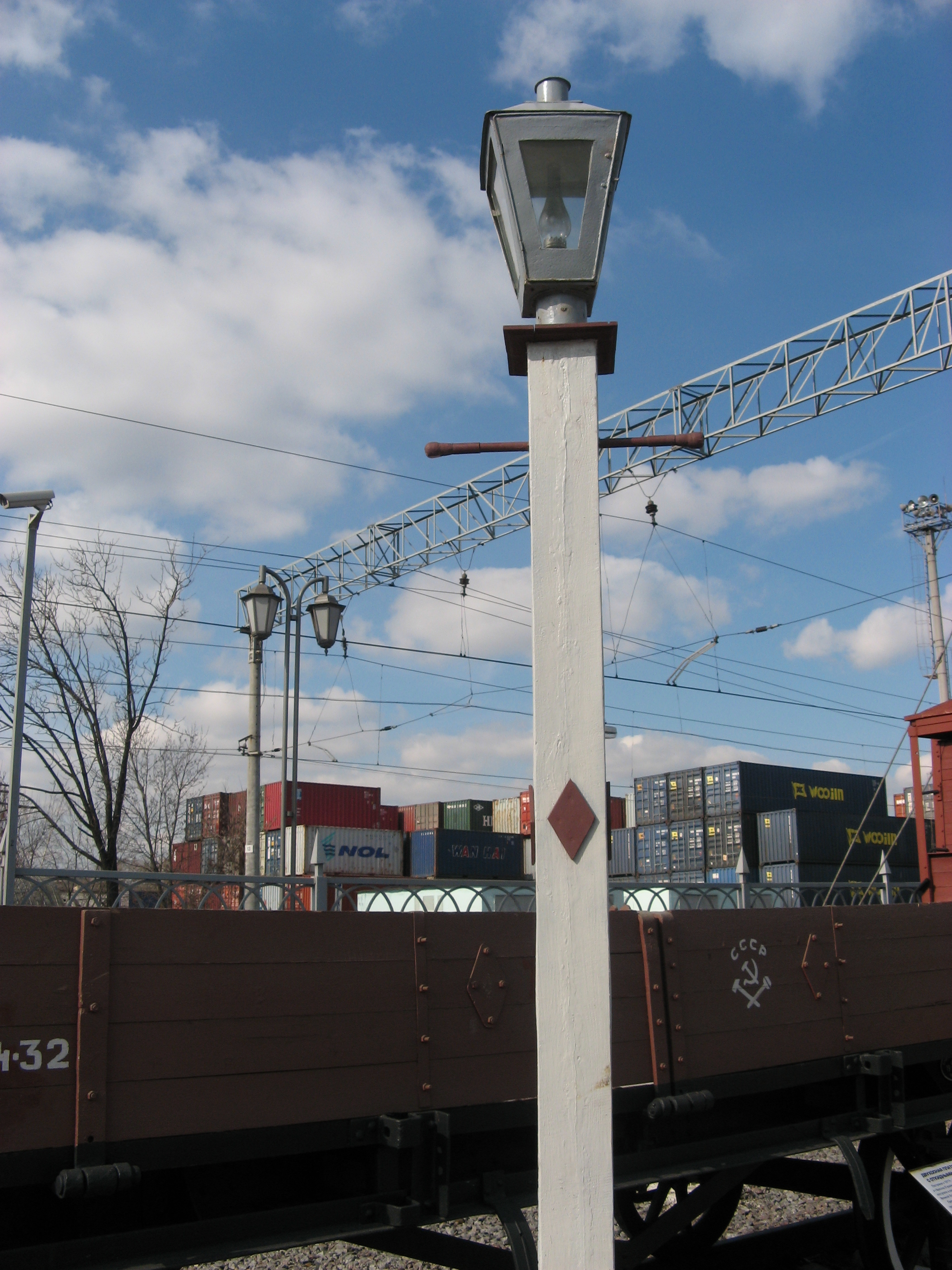
Station kerosene lamp at Rizhsky station railway museum, Moscow, Russia, 19th c.

== In popular culture ==
The derived term "lantern jaw[ed]" is used in two quite different still current ways, comparing faces with different types of lantern. According to the Oxford English Dictionary, it refers to "long thin jaws, giving a hollow appearance to the cheek"; this use was recorded in 1361, referring to a lantern with concave horn sides before glass was in use. Another meaning of "lantern jaw" compares a lantern with a jutting base – such as the 15th-century example above – to the face of a person with the extended chin of mandibular prognathism; this condition was also known as Habsburg jaw or Habsburg lip, as it was a hereditary feature of the House of Habsburg (see, for example, portraits of Charles V).

== See also ==
- Flashlight
- Lantern battery
- List of light sources

== Bibliography ==
- Fierro, Alfred (1996). Histoire et dictionnaire de Paris (in French). Lafont. ISBN 978-0-7859-9300-1.
- Needham, Joseph (1985). Science and Civilisation in China: Paper and Printing. Cambridge University Press. ISBN 978-0-521-08690-5.
