= Changting =

Changting may refer to:

- Changting County (长汀县), of Longyan, Fujian, China
  - Changting Prefecture (长汀), a territorial unit in the first half of the 20th century
- Changting dialect
- Changting station, station of Suzhou Rail Transit
- Frank Hsieh (謝長廷; pinyin: Xiè Chángtíng; born 1946), Taiwanese politician and former defense attorney
- Weng Changting (翁长亭), character in the Chinese television series Legend of Nine Tails Fox

== See also ==
- Changxing (disambiguation)
- Changxin (disambiguation)
