= Changxing (disambiguation) =

Changxing or Changxingxian (长兴县) is a county in Zhejiang, China

Changxing may also refer to:

== Places ==
- Changxing Island, Dalian, or Changxingdao
- Changxing Island, Shanghai, or Changxingdao (长兴岛)

== People ==
- Xin Changxing (born 1963), Chinese politician and Communist Party Secretary of Jiangsu
- Lai Changxing (born 1958), Chinese businessman and entrepreneur
- Chen Changxing (1771–1853), descendant of the Chen Family and martial artist
- Zhou Changxing (1916–1994), Chinese athlete

== Transport ==
- Changxing railway station, a high-speed railway station
- Changxing South railway station, a railway station
- Xinyi–Changxing railway, a single-track railway line in eastern China
- Oushan Changxing, a compact multi-purpose vehicle

== Other ==
- Changxing dialect

== See also ==
- Changting (disambiguation)
- Changxin (disambiguation)
