= National Neili Senior High School =

Municipal senior high school in Taoyuan, Taiwan

Coordinates: 24.9776°N 121.2566°E

Taoyuan Municipal Nei-Li Senior High School

Location
- No. 120 Chengzhang 4th St; Taoyuan City, 320; Taiwan

Information
- School type: Public school
- Established: 1999
- School district: Zhongli District
- Head of school: Li-Hua Lee
- Grades: 10 - 12
- Age range: 16 - 18
- Enrollment: 2516
- Language: Standard Mandarin (Traditional)
- Website: https://www.nlhs.tyc.edu.tw/

Taoyuan Municipal Nei-Li Senior High School (NLHS; Chinese: 桃園市立內壢高級中等學校) is a public high school in Zhongli District, Taoyuan, Taiwan. It was established in 1999.

NLHS has a swimming pool, a gym, and an underground parking garage. The school hosts an annual event where it invites recent alumni to place red lanterns around the campus to symbolize how they secured their places at university after performing well on the entrance examination. There were 825 graduates in 2010.
