= Changxing dialect =

Wu Chinese dialect

- 長興閒話, dzan-shin-ghe-o
- Native to: People's Republic of China
- Region: Changxing, Zhejiang, China
- Language family: Sino-Tibetan: Sinitic; Wu; Taihu; Changxing dialect

Language codes
- ISO 639-1: zh
- ISO 639-2: chi (B) zho (T)
- ISO 639-3: wuu

The Changxing dialect (simplified Chinese: 长兴话; traditional Chinese: 長興話; pinyin: Chángxīnghuà; Wu: dzan-shin ghe-o 長興閒話) is a dialect of the Wu language spoken in the county of Changxing of the prefecture-level city of Huzhou in Zhejiang province, China. The Changxing dialect is the main native language of Changxing county. Other dialects spoken by migrants include other Wu dialects from outside the county, mandarin dialects and the Min dialect (Southern Min spoken by 平陽人/the Pingyang people). In the north-western part of the county, close to Yixing County, some variants of Yixing dialect are spoken.
