= Changting station =

Suzhou Metro station

Coordinates: 31°20′41″N 120°31′32″E

Changting 长亭
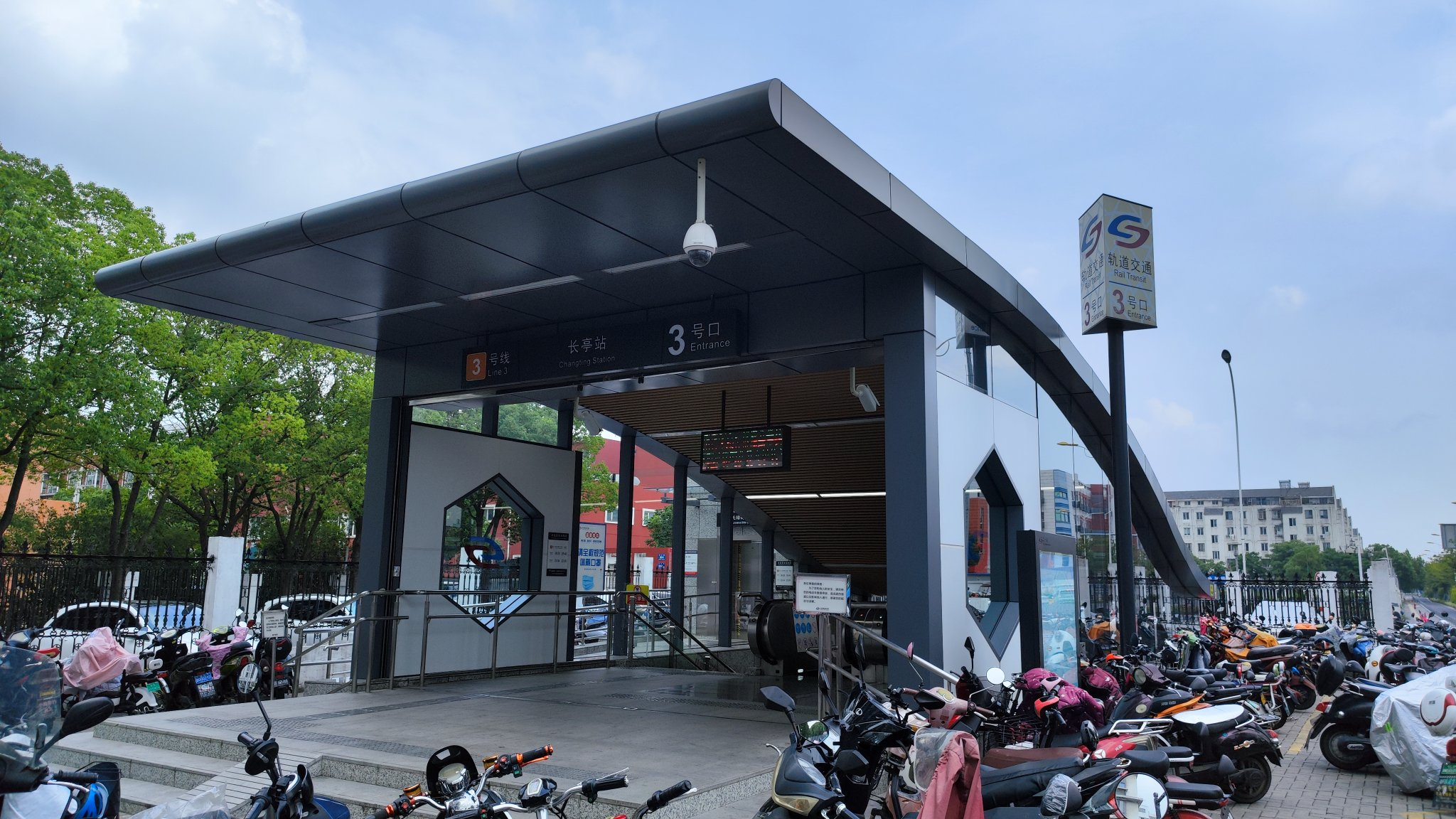

General information
- Location: Huqiu District, Suzhou, Jiangsu; China
- Operated by: Suzhou Rail Transit Co., Ltd
- Line(s): Line 3
- Platforms: 2 (1 island platform)

Construction
- Structure type: Underground

History
- Opened: December 25, 2019

Services
Preceding station	Suzhou Metro	Following station
Wenchanglu towards Suzhou Xinqu Railway Station	Line 3	Tongdun towards Weiting

Changting Station (Chinese: 长亭) is a station on Line 3 of the Suzhou Metro. The station is located in Huqiu District, Suzhou. It has been in use since December 25, 2019, when Line 3 first opened to the public.
