= Palace lantern =

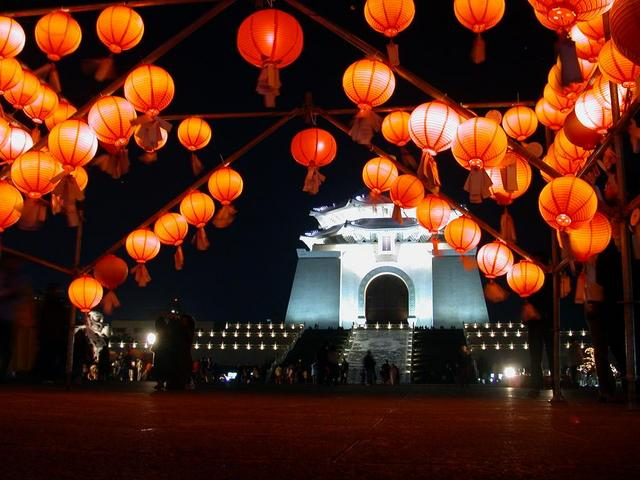
Chiang Kai-shek Memorial Hall Lantern Festival

Palace lanterns are traditional Chinese handicrafts by the Han Chinese used during various Chinese festivals. The genesis for the art form was created during the Eastern Han dynasty, and blossomed during the Sui and Tang dynasties. In accordance with its name, palace lanterns are used as lamps in palaces. They are often made using fine wood as a skeleton and decorated with spun silk and glass with coloured drawings or patterns in surface of the lantern. Due to the fact that it was used for the palace for a long time, apart from the lighting feature, they were also elaborately embellished, in order to show the wealth and luxury of the emperor. Orthodox palace lantern generally has anise, hexagonal, four corners, the pattern of each face may be "Dragon and phoenix bringing auspiciousness ", "Live for a long time", and "Everything goes well".

== History ==
Palace lanterns have been around for thousands of years in China. It has become a symbol of traditional Chinese culture. The palace lantern, as a special arts and crafts of handicraft production in China, enjoys a high reputation in the world. Up till now, palace lanterns are still found adorning luxury halls and residences.

The palace lantern, hanging on the beam of the hall, is generally bigger and embedded tapestry or glass, with the nice effect of adornment. According to legend, after the establishment of the Eastern Han dynasty to the Han dynasty emperor Liu Xiu, the capital of Luoyang, in order to celebrate this achievement, the emperor commanded that the palace are compelled to decorate with all kinds of beautiful lanterns and hold a big banquets to reward the people who followed him to establish the country. Later, the technology of the palace lantern was introduced to the commoners. Thus, the name "palace lantern" was born. On January 15 of the first year of emperor Suiyangdi, the palace lanterns were scattered throughout the city, decorating the city for half a month. After the Sui and Tang dynasties, on the Lantern Festival, all the family hung their treasured lamps highly, wherever is light and bright. The custom spread to the whole country and overseas.

In the Qing dynasty, it become a reward from the emperor to dukes and ministers.

=== Development ===
1. In 1279, naval warfare between Song and Yuan broke out in Jiangmen, which changed the dynasty, since that the southern Song dynasty perished. After the war, the artists fled to Jiangmen coastal area. One of the artists called Li and his descendants constantly made palace lanterns. Around the years of Guangxu, one of his descendants, called Li Xiyan, founded an industry of palace lanterns in Jiangmen.
2. In 1902, Jiangmen was set of commercial port. With the gradually flourishing commercial and the frequently diplomacy, the industry of palace lantern bloomed.
3. In 1930, the son of Li Xiyan called Li Fa inherited property and made the palace lantern reborn. In the mid-1940s, due to the long-term civil war, Li Fa's wife worried that the native cultural heritage would gradually become extinct. She came to Beijing to visit the forbidden city in two years, depicting the palace accessories with drawing pictures directly, and recorded comments.
4. After the 1940s, Mr. Li's business gradually shifted to Hong Kong. He transform the image which was drawn by his wife into modern lanterns. In 1949, the palace lantern obtained the structure patent of the United Kingdom, and was the first patent in the history of China's lighting industry.
5. The palace lanterns are different from any fixtures. It is the product of lighting and the perfect combination of arts and crafts, which is unique in the world. The palace lanterns have practical value, Oriental art and national style in China. It is rich in culture and art appreciation value.

== Gilt Bronze Human-Shaped Lamp ==
ChangXingongdeng

Gilt Bronze Human-Shaped Lamp, Han Chinese bronzes, unearthed from the tomb of Dou Wan in Mancheng, Hebei province, in 1968. It was displayed in China 2010 Shanghai World Expo. the Lantern is a full-bodied gilt setting maid who were holding the lamps, with an elegance expression. The body height of 48 cm, 15.85 kg. Gilt Bronze Human-Shaped Lamp was designed skillfully. on the on hand, the maid hand the lamp, on the other hand her sleeve seemed to prohibit form the wind. Actually, it is for the tubes to absorb smoke and avoid the air pollution. This Palace lantern got its name, because it has been placed in the long Palace of Dou Taihou (Liu Sheng grandmother). Nowadays, it was collected in the museum of Hebei province.

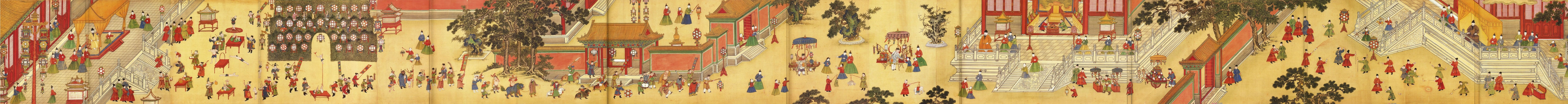
This painting, by an imperial court painter in 1485, depicts the Chenghua Emperor enjoying the festivities with families in the Forbidden City during the traditional Chinese Lantern Festival. It includes acrobatic performances, operas, magic shows and setting off firecrackers.
