= Baohuashan railway station =

Railway station in Zhenjiang, China

Coordinates: 32.1493°N 119.0555°E

Baohuashan 宝华山
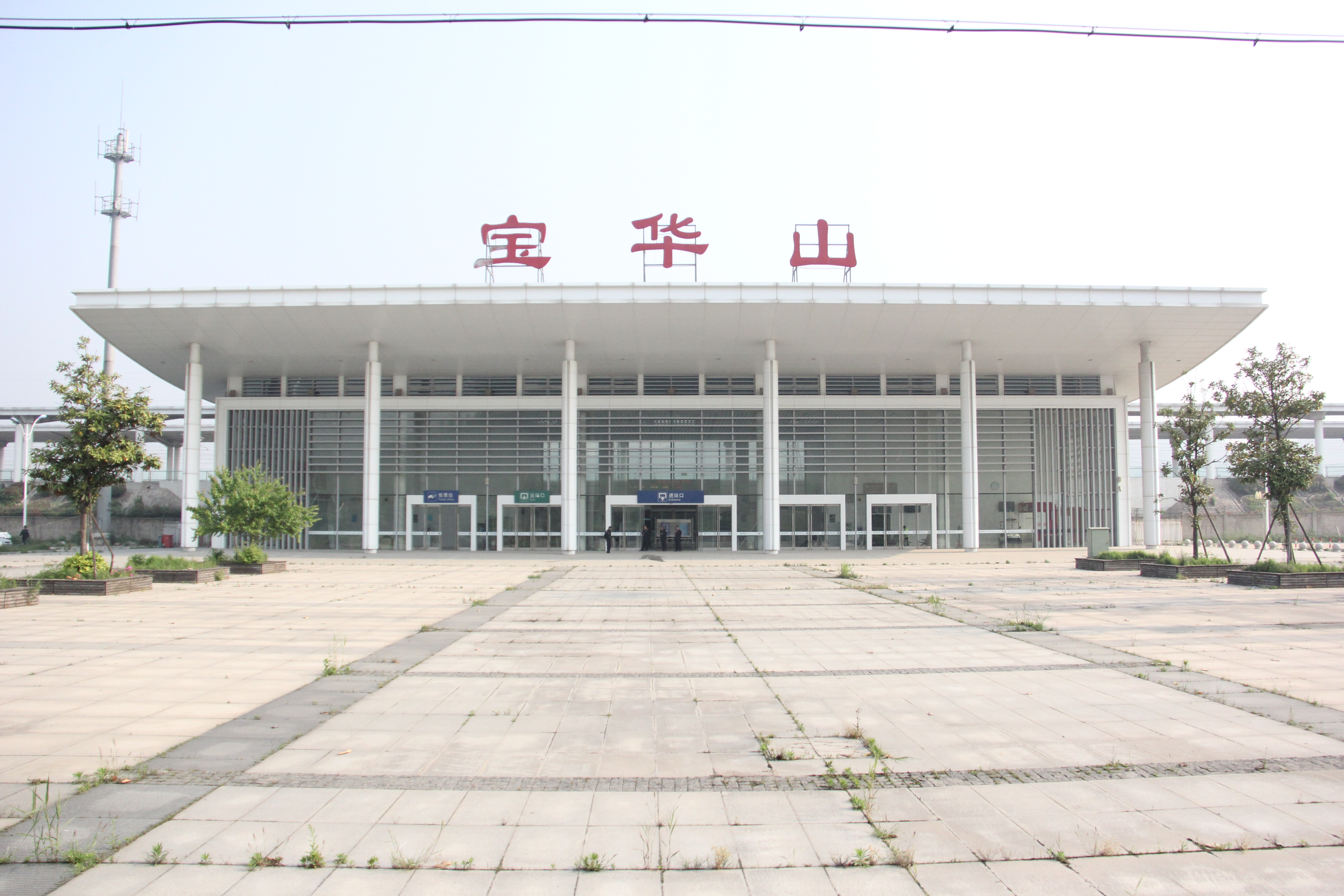
- Facade of Baohuashan Railway Station in April 2016

General information
- Location: Baohua, Jurong, Zhenjiang, Jiangsu; China
- Line: Shanghai-Nanjing Intercity Railway

Other information
- Station code: TMIS code: 66313; Telegraph code: BWH; Pinyin code: BHS
Location

Baohuashan railway station is a closed railway station of Shanghai-Nanjing Intercity Railway located in Baohua, Jurong, Zhenjiang, Jiangsu, People's Republic of China.

When the station opened in July 2010, a total of 8 trains stopped, but due to the long-term sparse passenger flow, with only about ten people on each train, the annual loss reached millions of yuan. The number of trains stopping each day was reduced to two. On 10 April 2020, the China Railway Shanghai Group closed passenger operations at stations with relatively small passenger flows, including Baohuashan railway station.

Preceding station	China Railway High-speed	Following station
Zhenjiang towards Shanghai or Shanghai Hongqiao	Shanghai–Nanjing intercity railway	Xianlin towards Nanjing
