= Kunshan South railway station =

Railway station in Kunshan, China

Kunshannan 昆山南
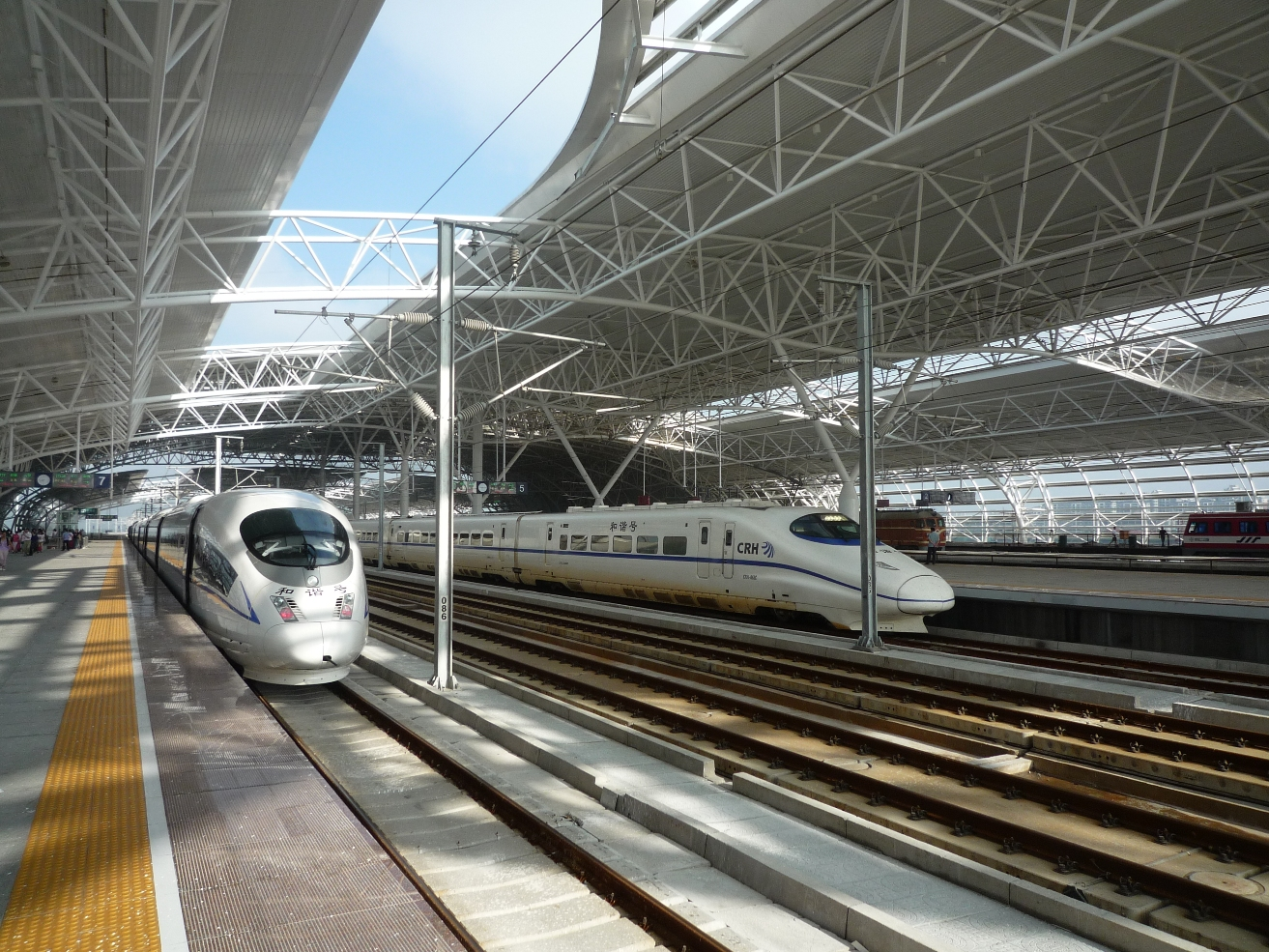

General information
- Other names: Kunshan South
- Location: Jiangsu; China
- Coordinates: 31°21′18″N 120°56′47″E
- Operated by: Shanghai Railway Bureau; China Railway Corporation
- Lines: Jinghu High-Speed Railway; Huning Intercity Rail
- Platforms: 4

Other information
- Station code: 66334 (TMIS code); KNH (telegram code); KSN (pinyin code)

History
- Opened: July 1, 2010
Location

The Kunshan South railway station (simplified Chinese: 昆山南站; traditional Chinese: 崑山南站; pinyin: Kūnshān-nán zhàn) is a railway station on the Jinghu High-Speed Railway and the Huning Intercity Rail. The station is located in Kunshan City, Jiangsu, China.

The Kunshan South Station has 2 platforms and 6 tracks on the Shanghai–Nanjing Intercity Railway, as well as 2 platforms and 6 tracks on the Beijing–Shanghai High-Speed Railway. (The two rail lines have the same track alignment in the central Kunshan City). The new station is located about a kilometer to the south from the Kunshan Station on the "old" Jinghu Railway.

== History ==
The construction of the station started on July 21, 2009. The Station opened on July 1, 2010.

| Preceding station | China Railway High-speed | Following station |
|---|---|---|
| Suzhou North towards Beijing South or Tianjin West | Beijing–Shanghai high-speed railway Part of the Shanghai–Wuhan–Chengdu passenger-dedicated railway | Shanghai Hongqiao Terminus |
| Huaqiao towards Shanghai or Shanghai Hongqiao | Shanghai–Nanjing intercity railway Part of the Shanghai–Wuhan–Chengdu passenger-dedicated railway | Yangchenghu towards Nanjing |
