= Xiashu railway station =

Railway station in Jiangsu, China

Coordinates: 32.172389°N 119.163226°E

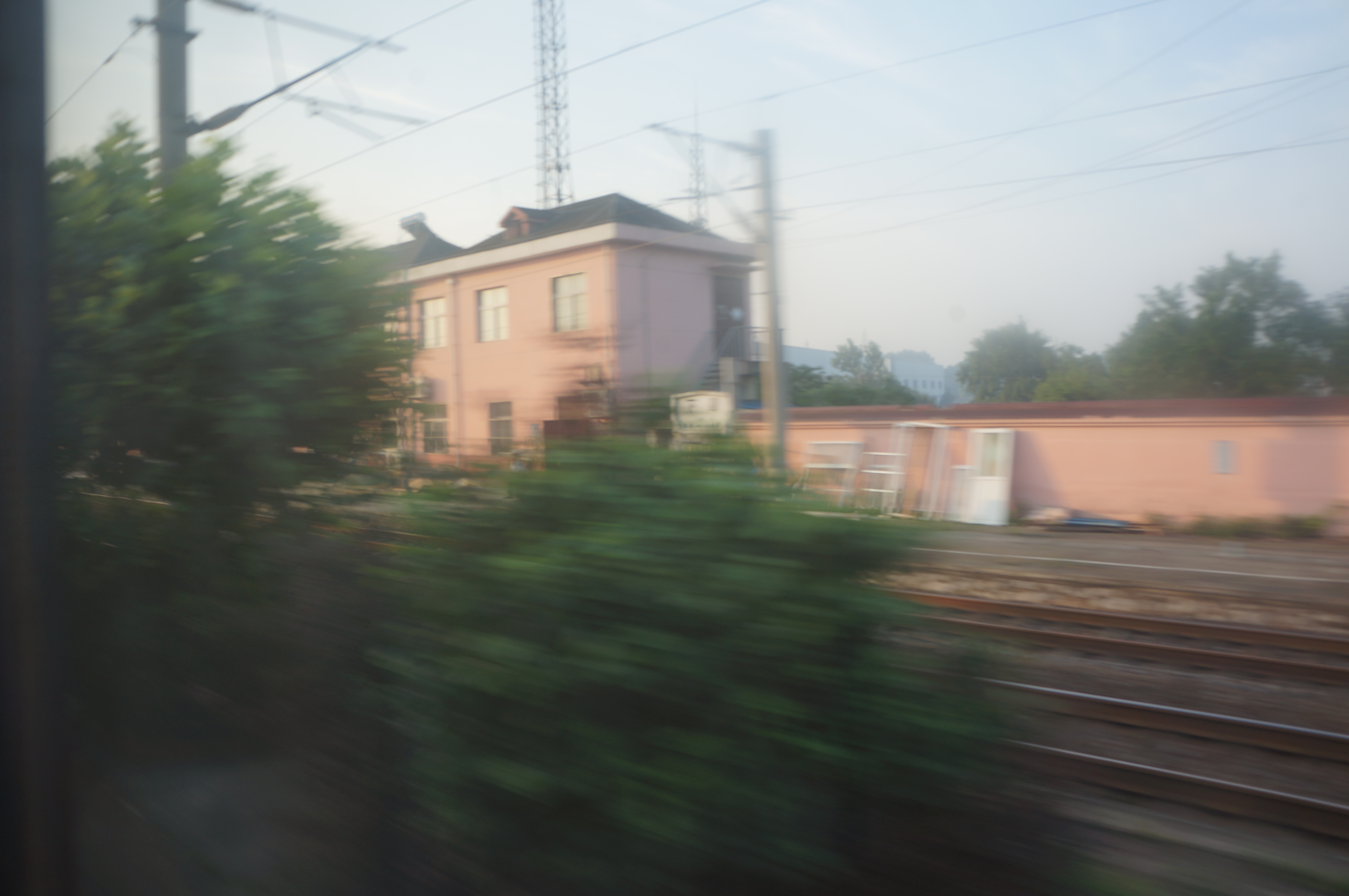
An Image of Xiashu railway station

Xiashu railway station is a railway station of Shanghai–Nanjing intercity railway located in Jiangsu, People's Republic of China. As of June 2016, there's no construction plans to start.

Currently it's a station of Beijing–Shanghai railway with no passenger services.
