= Danyang railway station =

Railway station in Danyang, Jiangsu, China

Danyang 丹阳
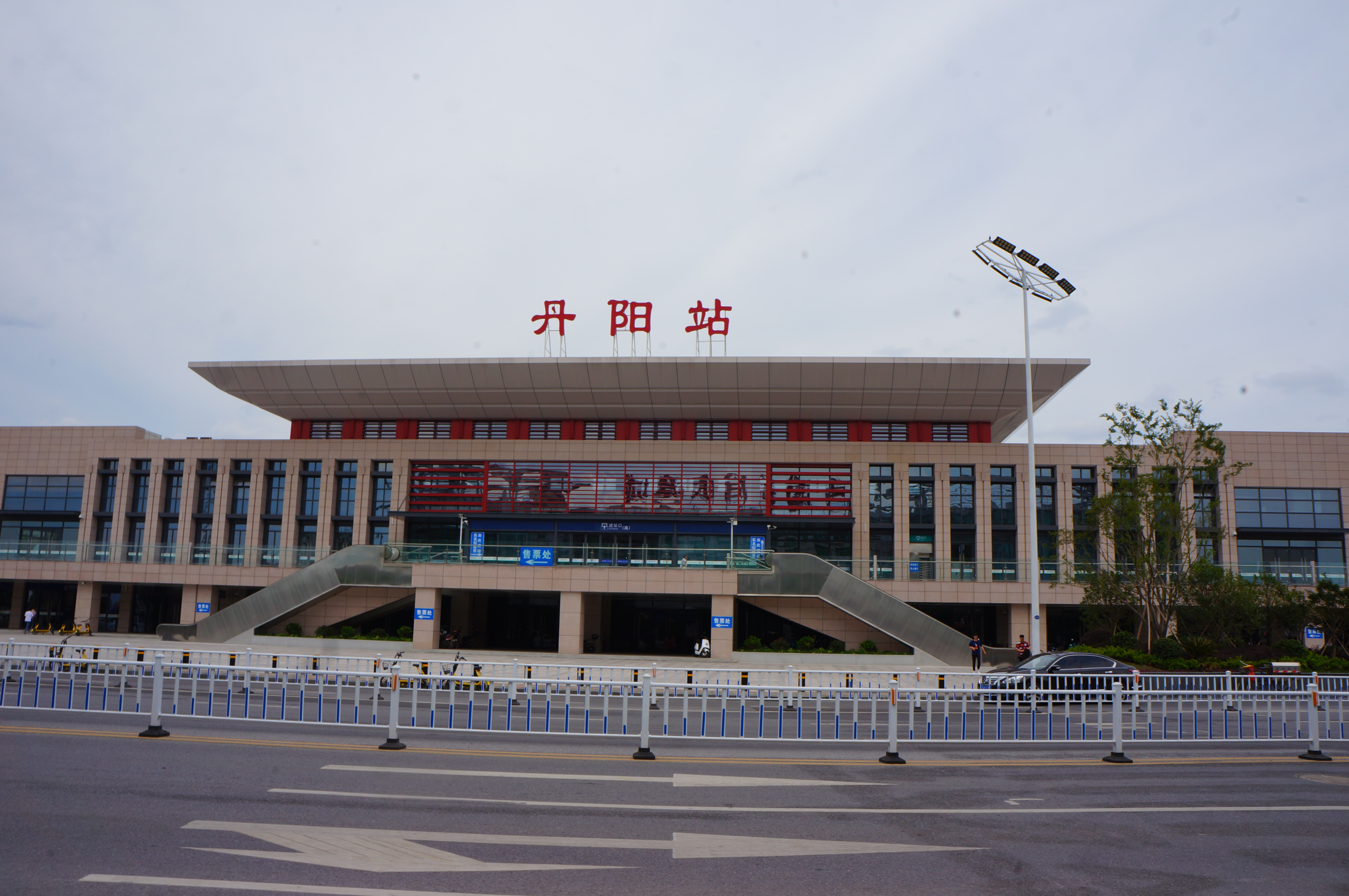
- South station building in June 2018
- dan'yang'zhan

General information
- Location: Danyang District, Zhenjiang, Jiangsu; China
- Coordinates: 32°0′12″N 119°35′15″E
- Operated by: Shanghai Railway Bureau, China Railway Corporation
- Lines: Jinghu railway, Shanghai-Nanjing Intercity Railway
- Platforms: 7

Other information
- Station code: TMIS code: 30428; Telegraph code: DYH; Pinyin code: DYA
- Classification: 2nd class station

History
- Opened: 1907
Location

Danyang railway station (simplified Chinese: 丹阳站; traditional Chinese: 丹陽站; pinyin: Dānyáng zhàn) is a railway station on the Jinghu and Shanghai-Nanjing Intercity railways. The station is located in Danyang City, Zhenjiang, Jiangsu, China. "Danyang railway station" now refers to two separate, but adjacent stations that are situated on either side of parallel regular (Beijing–Shanghai railway) and high-speed tracks. The "old" station serves regular trains, while the "new" station (referred to by locals as "大火车站" or "big train station") serves high-speed trains on the Shanghai-Nanjing Intercity High-Speed Railway. Danyang North railway station lies on the Beijing–Shanghai high-speed railway.

== History ==
The station opened in 1907. The current "old" station was built in 1958, to replace the original station, which was made necessary by the rebuilding of a branch of the Grand Canal. The new station was opened on 1 July 2010 with the Shanghai-Nanjing Intercity Railway. It has two platform tracks and two passing tracks. The old station has been rebuilt and was reopened on 1 February 2018 with high platforms, a new waiting room and other facilities, new entrances and passenger tunnels connecting the two stations. One of the old platforms was converted into garden beds, so it now has two platform tracks and three passing tracks.

Preceding station	China Railway High-speed	Following station
Changzhou towards Shanghai or Shanghai Hongqiao	Shanghai–Nanjing intercity railway	Dantu towards Nanjing
