= Shanghai West railway station =

Railway station in Shanghai

Shanghaixi
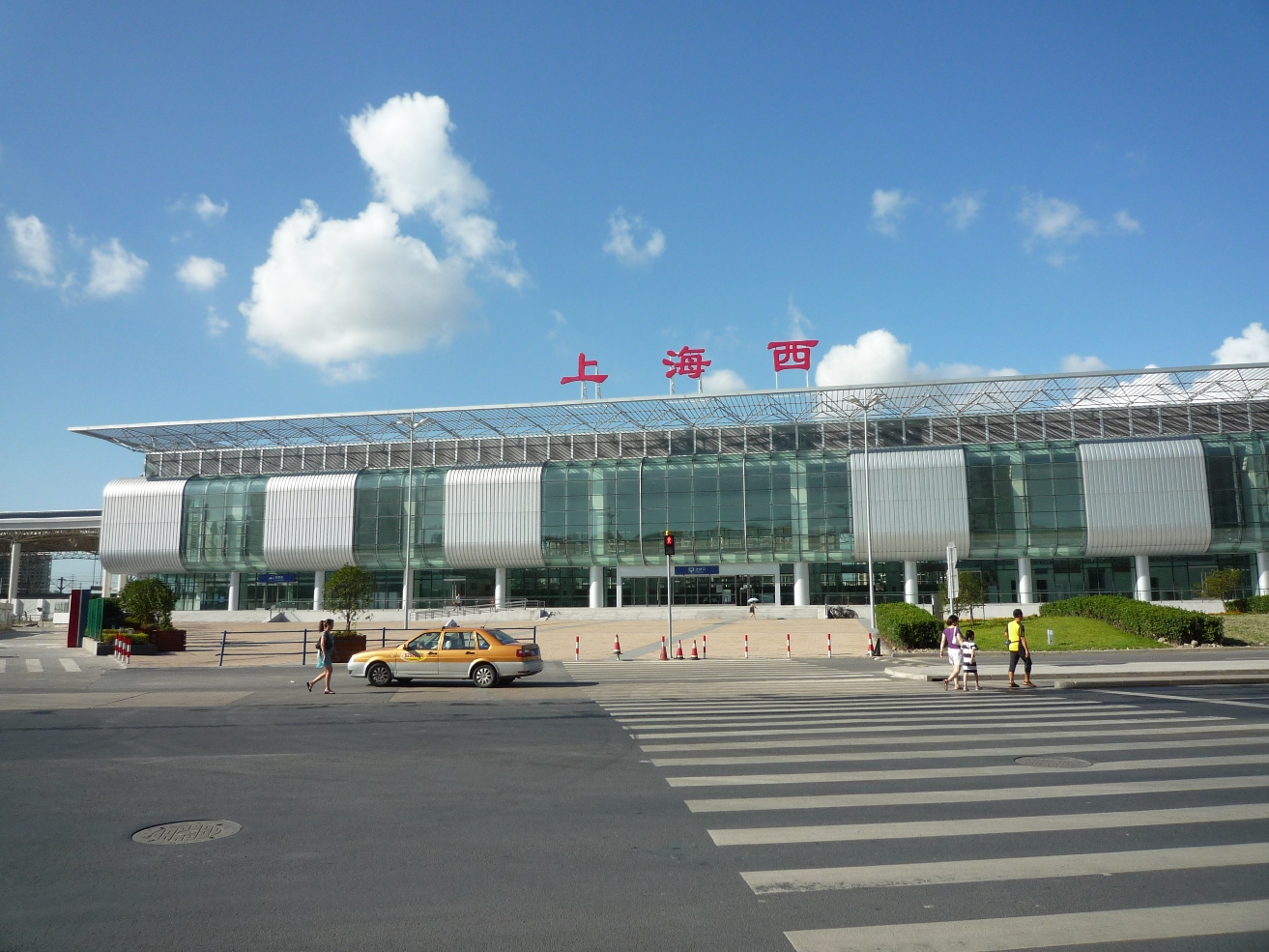
- A view of the new plaza in front of Shanghaixi railway station.

Chinese name
- Simplified Chinese: 上海西站
- Traditional Chinese: 上海西站
Transcriptions
Standard Mandarin
- Hanyu Pinyin: Shànghǎi Xī zhàn

General information
- Location: Taopu Road, Putuo District, Shanghai; China
- Coordinates: 31°15′53″N 121°23′53″E
- Lines: Beijing–Shanghai railway Shanghai–Kunming railway Shanghai–Nanjing intercity railway

Other information
- Station code: TMIS code: 30662; Telegraph code: SXH; Pinyin code: SHX
- Classification: 1st class station

History
- Former names: Zhenru
Services
Preceding station	China Railway	Following station
Jiangqiaozhen towards Beijing	Beijing–Shanghai railway	Shanghai Terminus
Shanghai Terminus	Shanghai–Kunming railway	Jiangqiaozhen towards Kunming
Preceding station	China Railway High-speed	Following station
Shanghai Terminus	Shanghai–Nanjing intercity railway Part of the Shanghai–Wuhan–Chengdu High-Speed Railway	Nanxiang North towards Nanjing
Location
- Location within Shanghai

Shanghaixi (Shanghai West) railway station (Chinese: 上海西站; pinyin: Shànghǎi Xī zhàn) is a railway station in the Putuo District of Shanghai which in the past, lost its importance as a result of Shanghai railway station further to the east. It was redeveloped between 2006 and 2010.

== History ==
Built in 1905, the station was originally known as Jessfield railway station, then Zhenru railway station until 1989. Destinations of departing trains included Yantai, Zaozhuang, Hengyang, Ganzhou (Jinggangshan) and Chengdu, as well as a direct train from Shanghai to Zhangjiajie. The station lost importance as most trains stopped at Shanghai railway station instead to the east. The station was closed down for renovation works on July 1, 2006, with the opening of the newly renovated Shanghai South railway station. It was re-opened in 2010. Now it only serves high-speed trains running between Shanghai and Nanjing, with a few ending at Suzhou, Wuxi, and Changzhou.

== Metro station ==
An interchange station, now served by metro lines 11, 15, and 20, was opened in 2009. It connects to the mainline station near exit 1.

== See also ==
- Shanghai railway station
- Shanghai Hongqiao railway station
- Shanghai South railway station
