= Huaqiao station =

Huaqiao station (simplified Chinese: 花桥站; traditional Chinese: 花橋站; pinyin: Huāqiáo zhàn) may refer to the following stations:

- Huaqiao metro station (Kunshan), a metro station on Line 11 (Shanghai Metro) and Line 11 (Suzhou Metro)
- Huaqiao railway station, a closed railway station on the Shanghai–Nanjing intercity railway
- Huaqiao station (Chengdu Metro), a metro station on Line 10 (Chengdu Metro)
- Huaqiao station (Changsha Metro), a metro station on Line 6 (Changsha Metro)

== See also ==
- Huaqiao (disambiguation)
- Lianhuaqiao station, Beijing Subway
