= Nanxiang North railway station =

Railway station in Shanghai, China

Nanxiang North
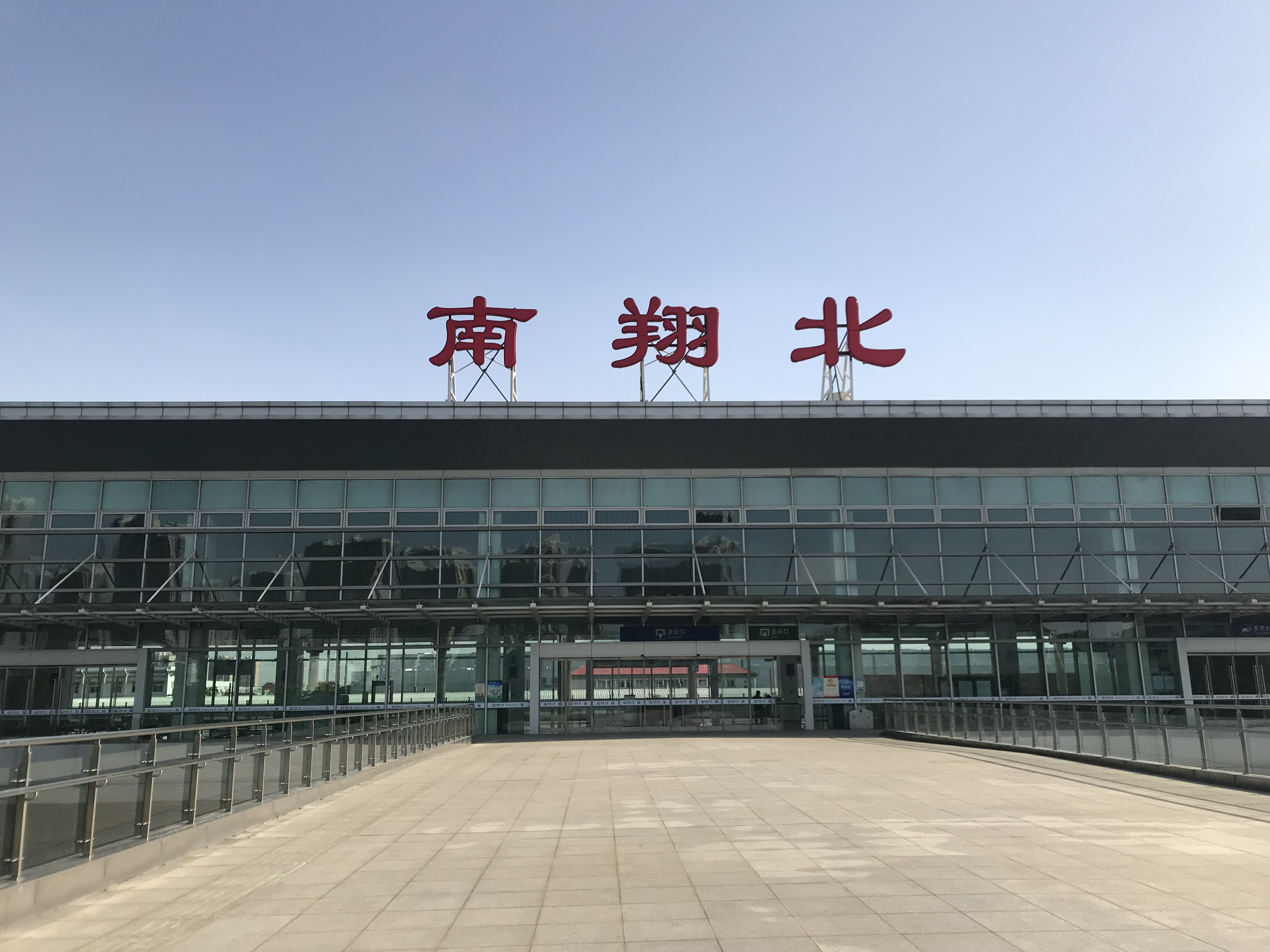
- Photo of Nanxiang North railway station station.

Chinese name
- Simplified Chinese: 南翔北站
- Traditional Chinese: 南翔北站
Transcriptions
Standard Mandarin
- Hanyu Pinyin: Nán Xiáng Běi Zhàn

General information
- Location: Jinchang West Road, Jiading District, Shanghai; China
- Coordinates: 31°16′54″N 121°18′33″E
- Operator: CR Shanghai
- Line: Shanghai–Nanjing intercity railway
- Platforms: 2

Other information
- Station code: TMIS code: 66343; Telegraph code: NXB; Pinyin code: NXB

History
- Opened: 2010; 16 years ago
Services
Preceding station	China Railway High-speed	Following station
Shanghai West towards Shanghai or Shanghai Hongqiao	Shanghai–Nanjing intercity railway	Anting North towards Nanjing
Location
- Location within Shanghai

Nanxiang North railway station is a station of the Shanghai-Nanjing intercity railway located in Jiading District, Shanghai, China. It is a railway station under the jurisdiction of China Railway Shanghai Group.

== Station information ==
Nanxiang North railway station began operation in July 2010. The station has a building area of approximately 2,000 square meters with 2 platforms and 4 tracks.

In 2011, the station was expanded as a transfer hub for the Shanghai-Nanjing High-Speed Railway and local buses, and also included parking facilities.
