= DYH =

DYH or Dyh may refer to:

== Arts and entertainment ==
- DYH, an artist who made the 2020 song "Let's Go Home" in Fuser (video game)
- Dyh, a 2007 Bulgarian cover of the 2006 EP Kalanta, by Greek artist Despina Vandi
- Yusof Haslam, a Malaysian actor and film director

== Science ==
- DyH^{2}, one of the binary compounds of hydrogen, made with dysprosium
- Parahoplitidae, a family of Cretaceous ammonites, by Catalogue of Life identifier

== Other uses ==
- Derry Young Hooligans, which Robert Ford (British Army officer) ordered to target in a 1972 memo during the Troubles
- Danyang railway station, Jiangsu province, China
