= Huaqiao =

Huaqiao may refer to:

- Overseas Chinese (华侨), or Huaqiao in pinyin
- Huaqiao University (华侨大学), in Quanzhou, Fujian
- Huaqiao Road Subdistrict (华侨路街道), Gulou District, Nanjing

== Towns ==
- Huaqiao, Yujiang County (画桥镇), Jiangxi

Written as "花桥镇":

- Huaqiao, Anhui, in Wuhu County
- Huaqiao, Chongqing, in Zhong County
- Huaqiao, Guizhou, in Shiqian County
- Huaqiao, Wuxue, in Hubei
- Huaqiao, Dong'an County, Hunan
- Huaqiao, Hengnan (花桥镇), a town of Hengnan County, Hunan.
- Huaqiao, Zhongfang (花桥镇), a town of Zhongfang County, Hunan
- Huaqiao, Kunshan, Jiangsu
- Huaqiao, Shangrao, in Dexing, Jiangxi
- Huaqiao, Guang'an, in Guang'an District, Guang'an, Sichuan
- Huaqiao, Xinjin District, in Xinjin District, Chengdu, Sichuan
- Huaqiao, Sanmen County, Zhejiang

== Transport ==
- Huaqiao metro station (Kunshan), a metro station on Line 11 (Shanghai Metro) and Line 11 (Suzhou Metro)
- Huaqiao railway station, a closed railway station on the Shanghai–Nanjing intercity railway
- Huaqiao station (Chengdu Metro), a metro station on Line 10 (Chengdu Metro)
- Huaqiao station (Changsha Metro), a metro station on Line 6 (Changsha Metro)

== See also ==
- Huaqiao station (disambiguation)
