= Wangting East railway station =

Railway station in Jiangsu, China

Wangting East railway station (Chinese: 望亭东站) is a reserved railway station on the Shanghai–Nanjing Intercity Railway located in Jiangsu, People's Republic of China.
