= Weiting West railway station =

Railway station in Suzhou, Jiangsu, China

Weiting West railway station (Chinese: 唯亭西站) is a reserved railway station of Shanghai–Nanjing Intercity Railway located in Weiting Town, Suzhou, Jiangsu, China.
