= Line 31 (Shanghai Metro) =

Metro line in Shanghai, China

- 31

Overview
- Native name: 上海地铁31号线
- Status: Planned
- Locale: Baoshan, Jiading; Shanghai, China
- Website: www.shmetro.com

Service
- Type: Rapid transit
- System: Shanghai Metro
- Operator(s): Shanghai No. Metro Operation Co., Ltd.

Technical
- Number of tracks: 2
- Track gauge: 1,435 mm (4 ft 8 1/2 in)
- Electrification: Overhead lines (1500 volts)
Route map
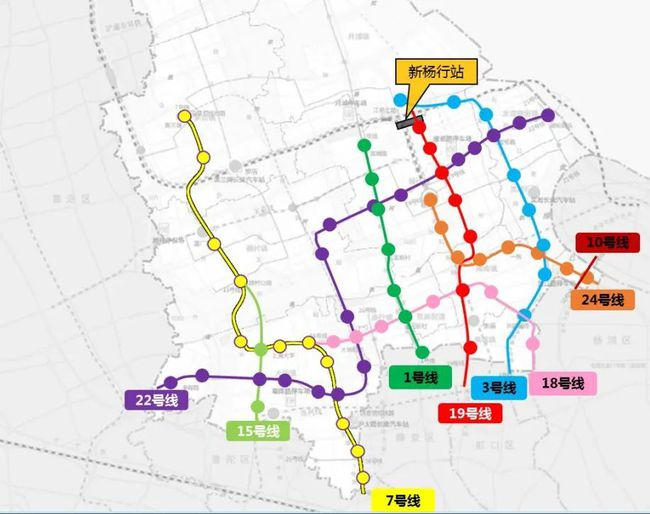

Line 31, formerly Line 22 from 2017 to 2024, is a future subway line on the Shanghai Metro. It will be located in south-west Shanghai near Dachang in Baoshan District and Nanxiang North railway station in Jiading District. The line was announced by the Municipal government in 2016. By 2017, the initial proposal was approved and awaiting further planning.
