= Anting North railway station =

Railway station in Shanghai, China

Antingbei 安亭北
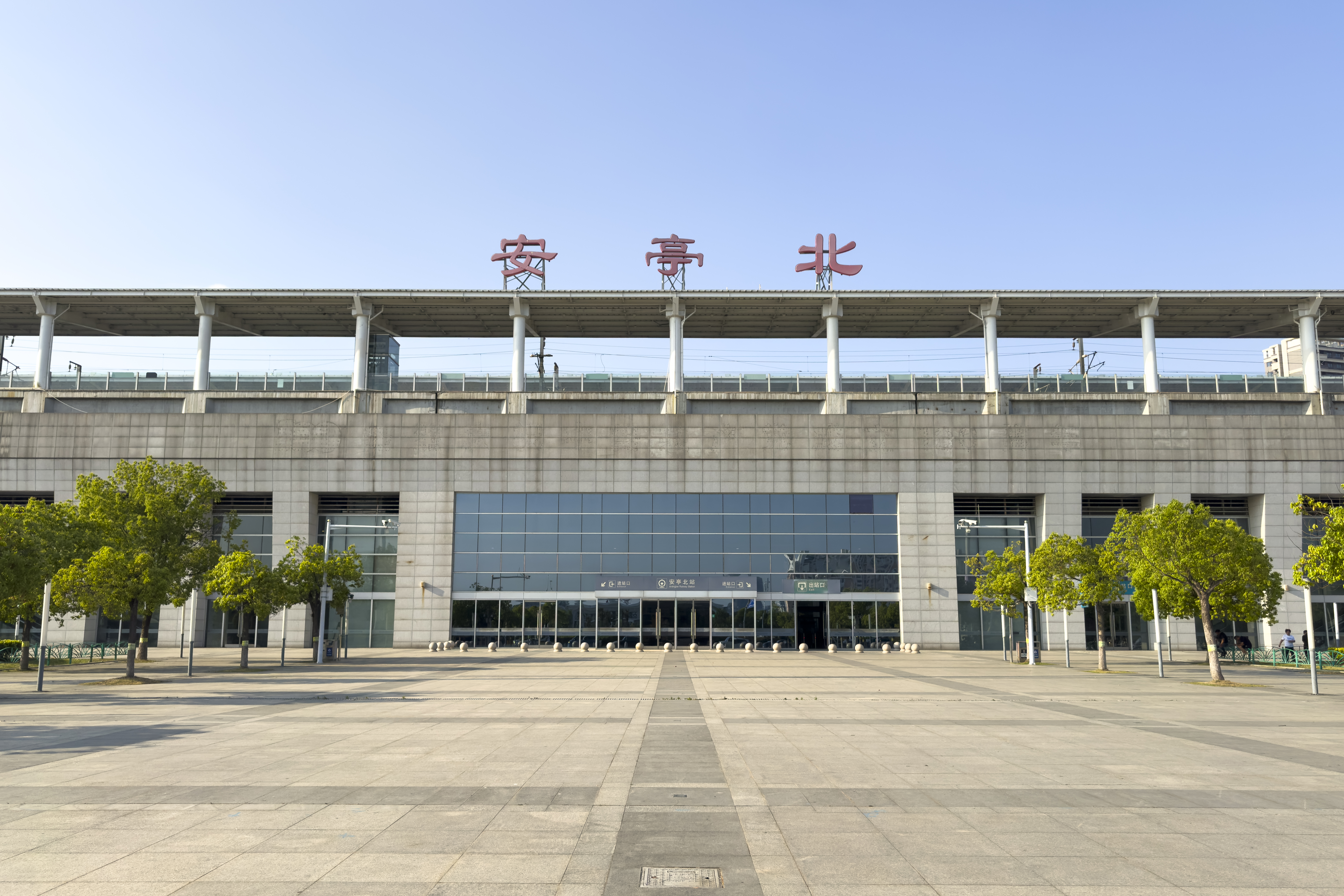

General information
- Location: Anting Town, Jiading District, Shanghai; China
- Line: Shanghai–Nanjing Intercity Railway

Other information
- Station code: TMIS code: 66340; Telegraph code: ASH; Pinyin code: ATB

Services
Preceding station	China Railway High-speed	Following station
Nanxiang North towards Shanghai	Shanghai–Nanjing intercity railway Part of the Shanghai–Wuhan–Chengdu passenger-dedicated railway	Huaqiao towards Nanjing
Shanghai Hongqiao Terminus	Shanghai–Nanjing intercity railway Part of the Shanghai–Wuhan–Chengdu passenger-dedicated railway	Huaqiao towards Nanjing
Location

Anting North railway station (Chinese: 安亭北站) is a railway station on the Shanghai–Nanjing Intercity Railway line located in Anting, Jiading District, Shanghai, China.

== Station information ==
Anting North railway station is a second-class station under the jurisdiction of the China Railway Shanghai Group.

The station's design began on 1 July, 2008, and it was put into operation on 1 July, 2010. Starting from July 27, 2019, the station launched a pilot program for electronic tickets.

As of 2018, the station has a building area of 2,000 square meters, featuring 2 platforms and 4 tracks. The designed peak hour passenger capacity is approximately 1,500 passengers per hour currently and is expected to increase to 2,000 passengers per hour in the long term.

In 2020, it was reported that there are plans to combine the two railway stations of Anting North and Anting West for better transfer efficiency. This is possible because the two stations are located in close proximity.

== Station structure ==
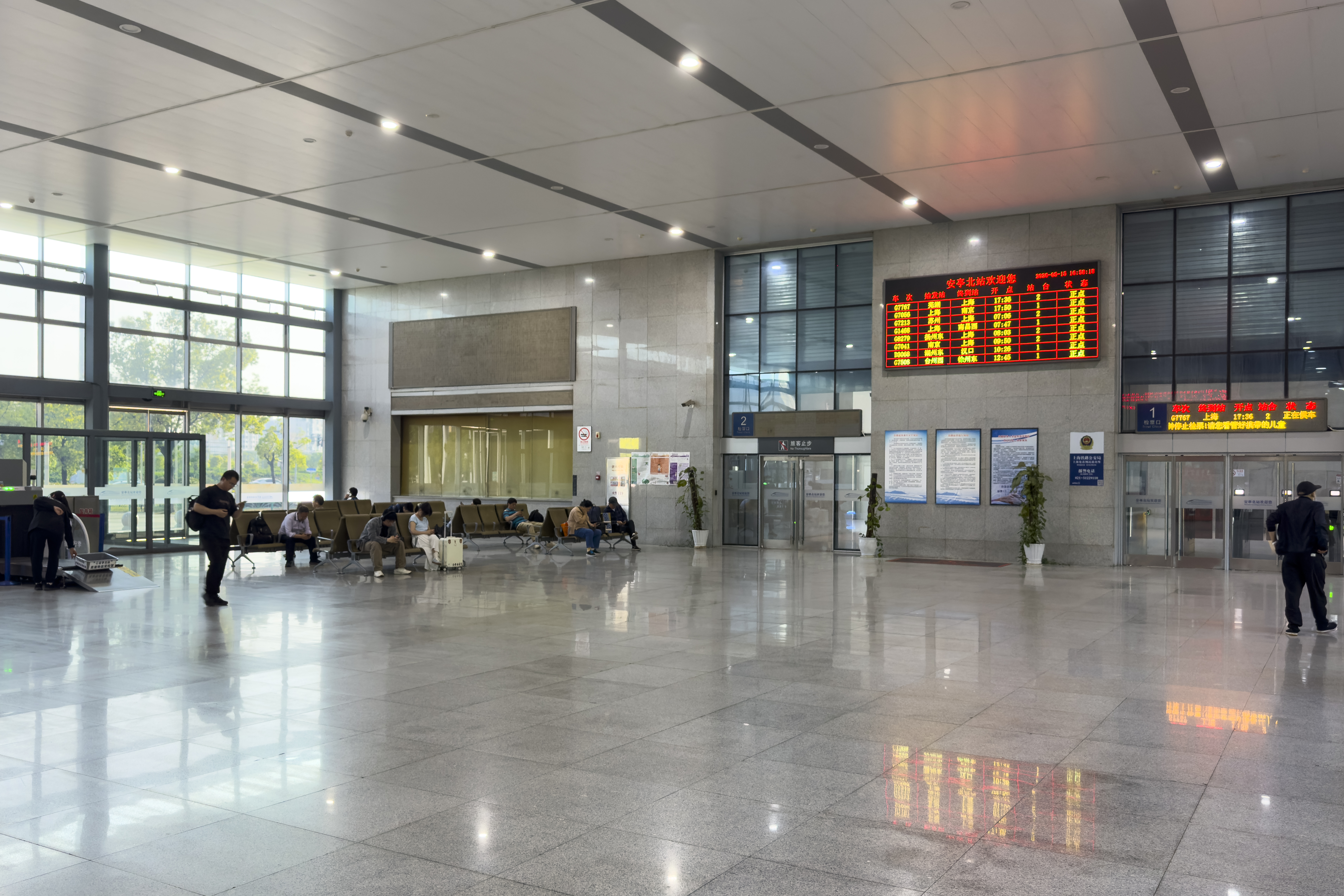
Waiting area

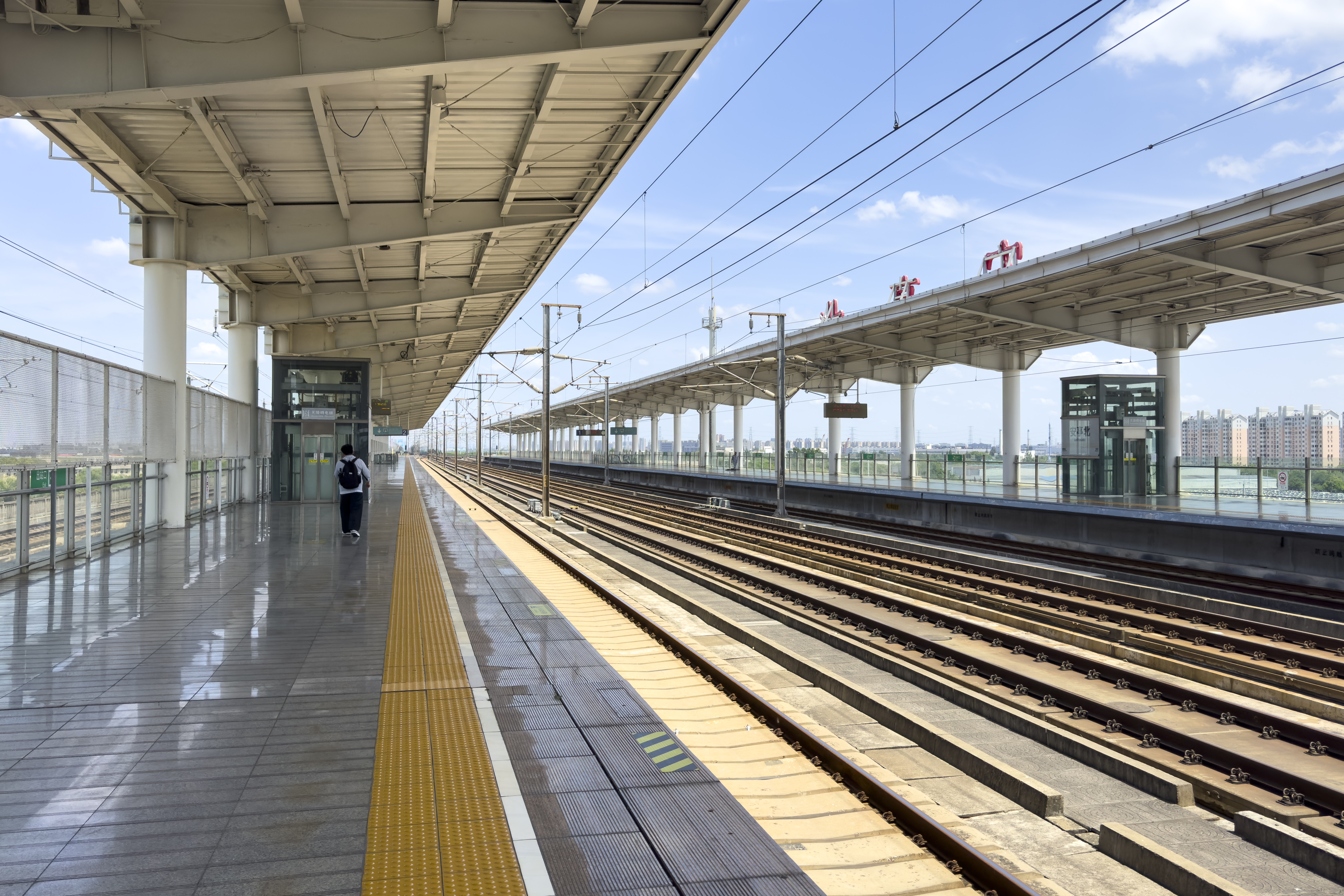
Platform 2
