= Huaqiao railway station =

Railway station in Jiangsu Province, China

Coordinates: 31.3358°N 121.0461°E

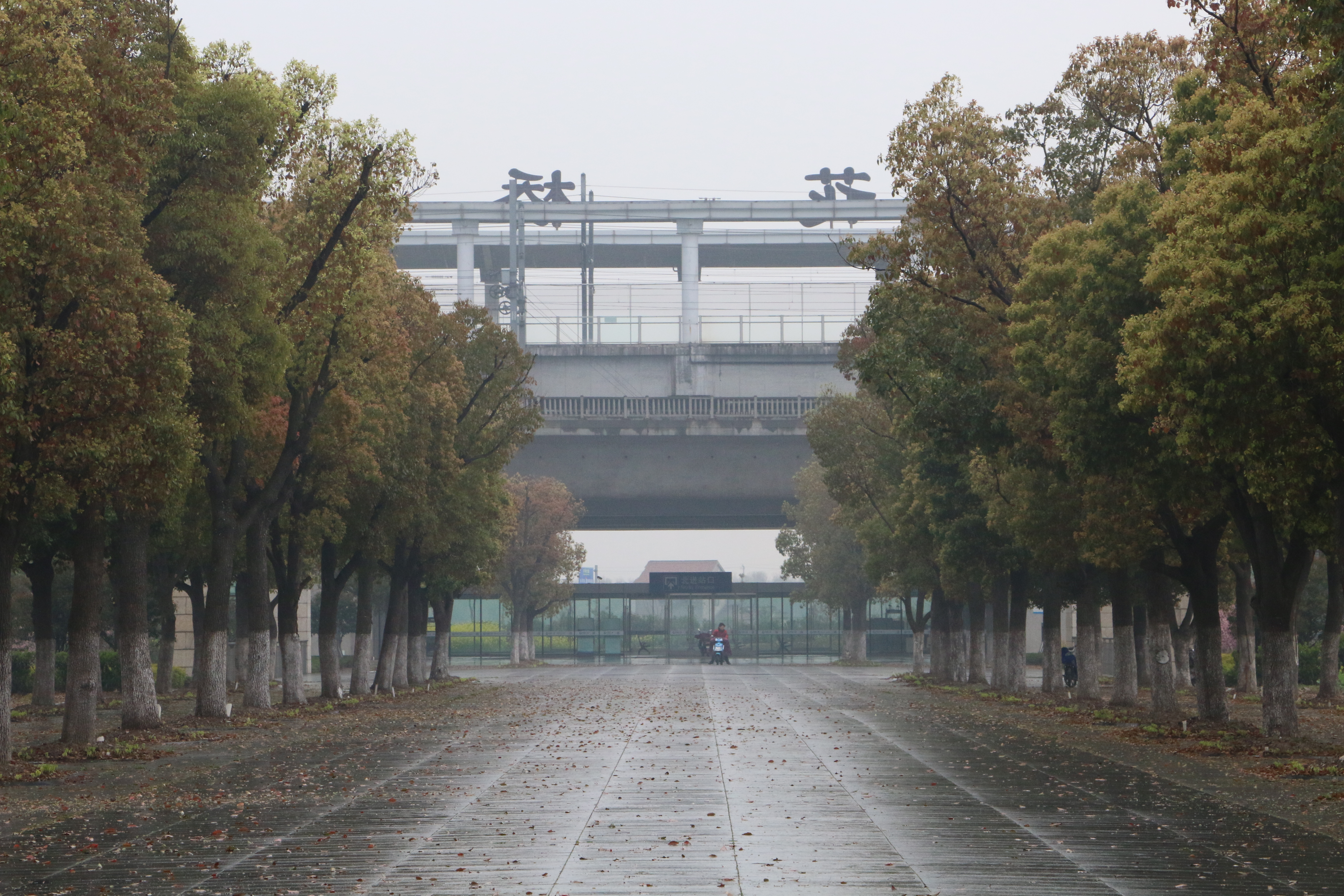
Facade of Huaqiao railway station

Huaqiao (simplified Chinese: 花桥; traditional Chinese: 花橋; pinyin: Huāqiáo) is a railway station on the Shanghai–Nanjing intercity railway located in Kunshan, Suzhou, Jiangsu Province, China.

On 10 April 2020, the China Railway Shanghai Group closed passenger operations at stations with relatively small passenger flows, including Huaqiao railway station.

Preceding station	China Railway High-speed	Following station
Anting North towards Shanghai or Shanghai Hongqiao	Shanghai–Nanjing intercity railway Part of the Shanghai–Wuhan–Chengdu passenger-dedicated railway	Kunshan South towards Nanjing
