= Shanghai–Nanjing intercity railway =

Railway line in China

Shanghai–Nanjing intercity railway Shanghai–Nanjing section of the Shanghai–Wuhan–Chengdu passenger railway corridor
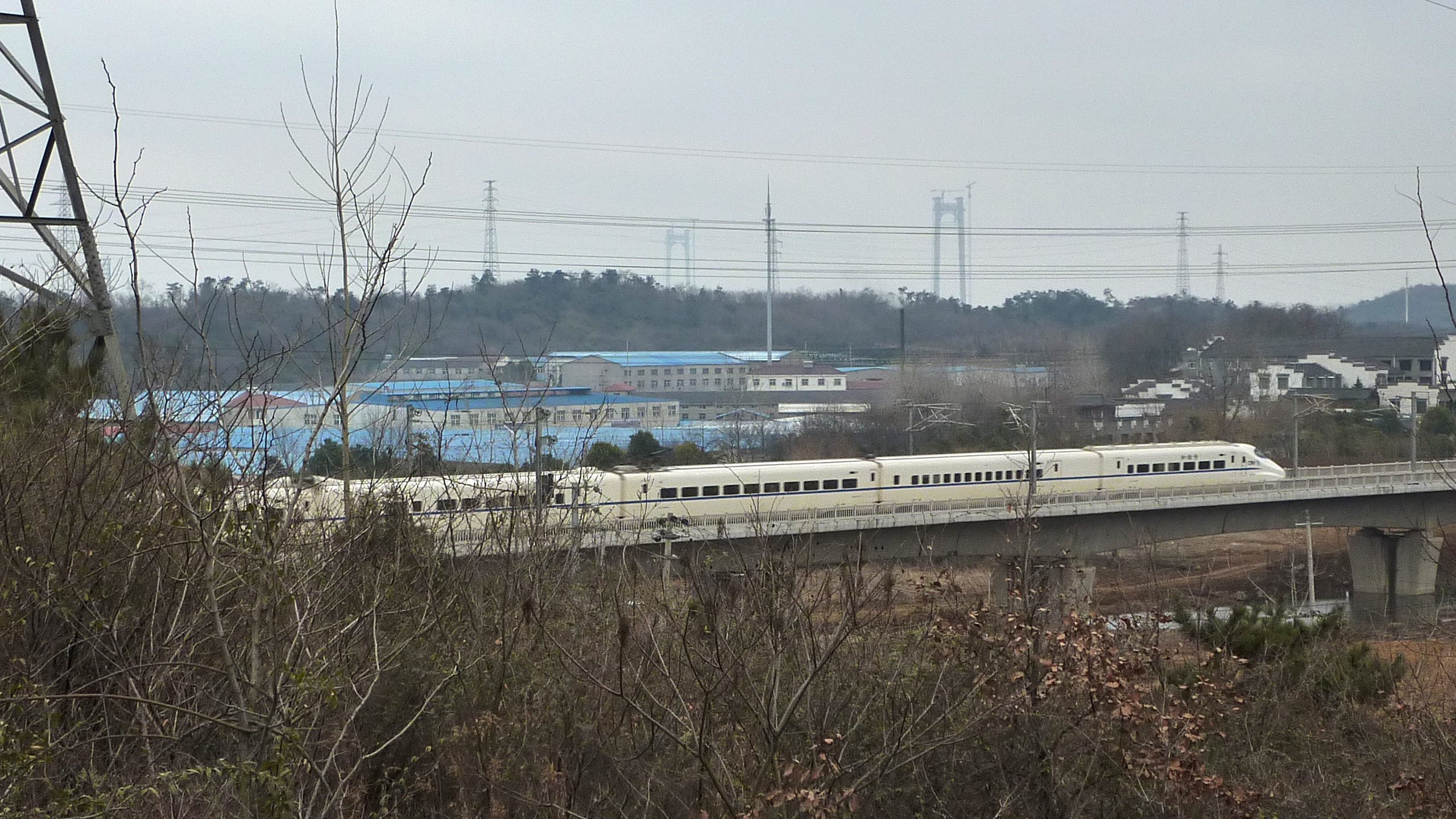
- A train on Shanghai–Nanjing intercity railway in Qixia District, Nanjing

Overview
- Native name: 沪宁城际铁路 沪宁城际线 沪宁城际高速铁路 沪宁高铁 沪宁城铁
- Status: Operational
- Owner: CR Shanghai
- Locale: Shanghai & Jiangsu province China
- Termini: Shanghai Hongqiao Shanghai; Nanjing South Nanjing
- Stations: 31

Service
- Type: High-speed rail
- System: China Railway High-speed
- Train number(s): G70xx (Intercity); Dxxxx (Cross-line D train); G7xxx, when the 1st x isn’t 0 (Short distance crossline G train)
- Operator(s): CR Shanghai
- Rolling stock: Current: CRH1B CRH1E CRH2A CRH2B CRH2C CRH380B CRH380BL CRH380CL CRH380D CR400AF, CR400BF; Former: CRH3C CRH380A CRH380AL
- Daily ridership: 180,000 per day (2011)

History
- Opened: July 1, 2010; 15 years ago

Technical
- Line length: 301 km (187 mi) (Main line)
- Track gauge: 1,435 mm (4 ft 8 1/2 in) standard gauge
- Minimum radius: 4,000 m (2.5 mi)
- Electrification: 25 kV 50 Hz AC (Overhead line)
- Operating speed: 300 km/h (190 mph) (operation speed); 350 km/h (220 mph) (designed speed)

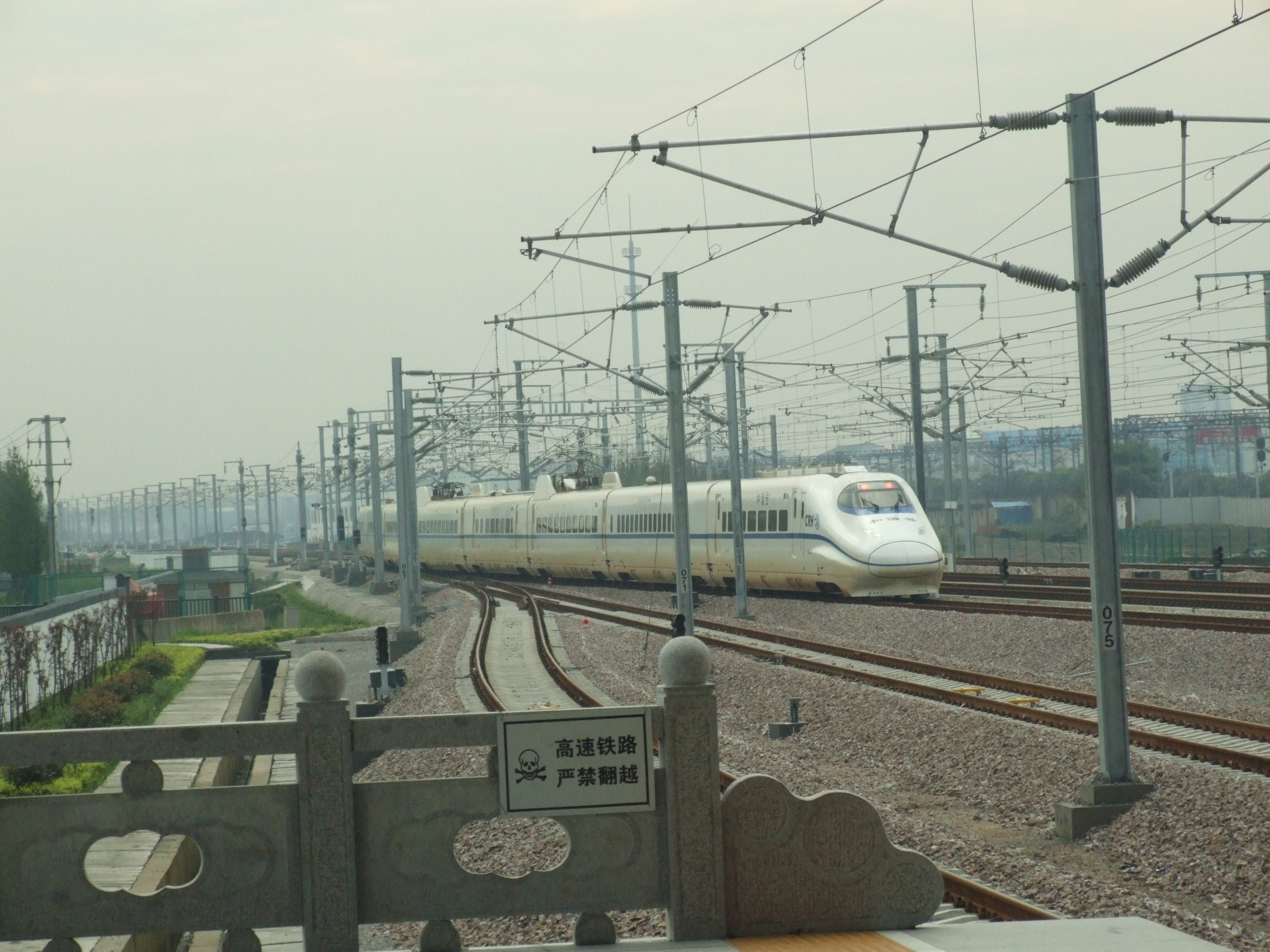
CRH2C is entering Suzhou railway station

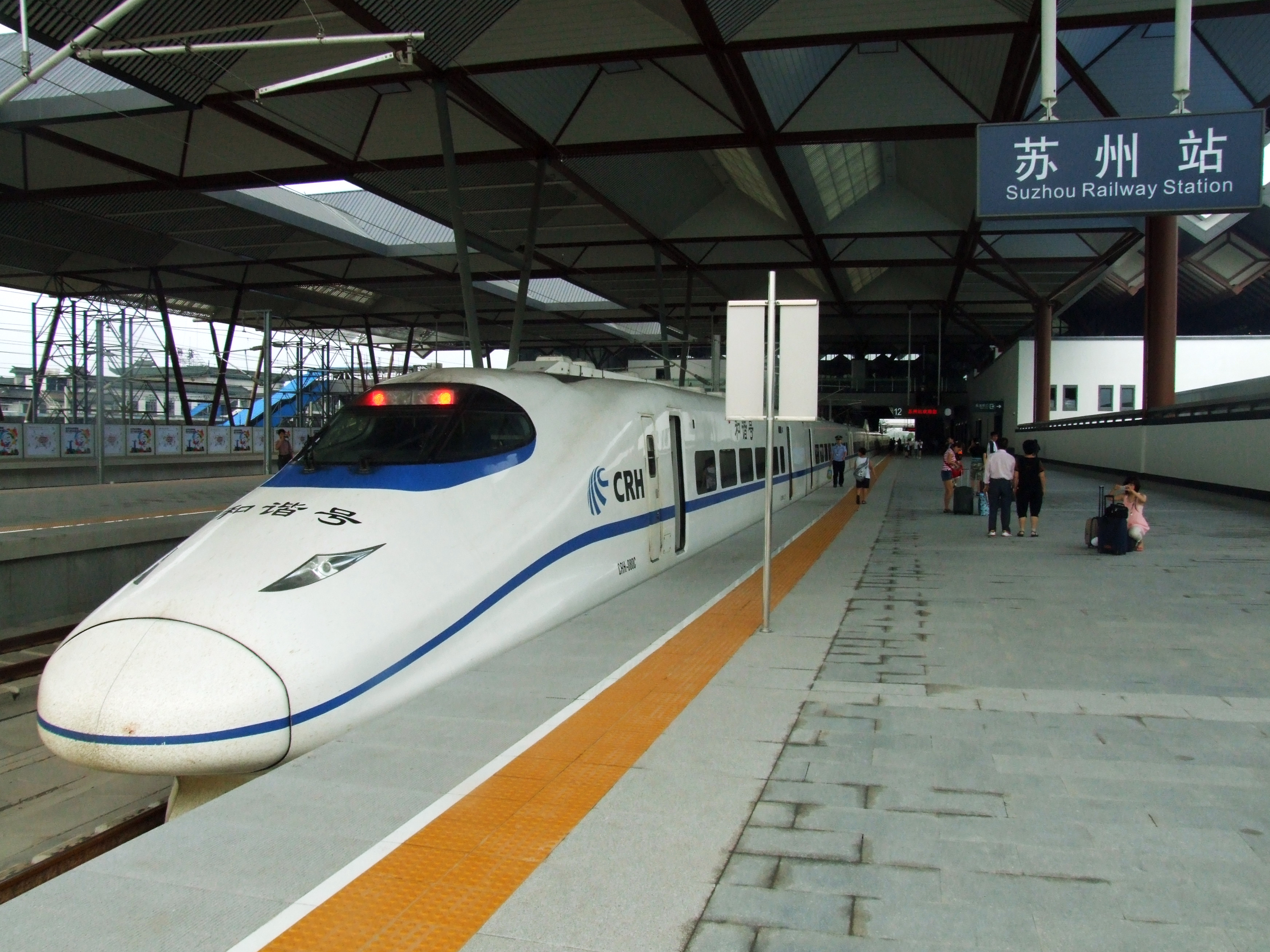
CRH stopping in Suzhou railway station

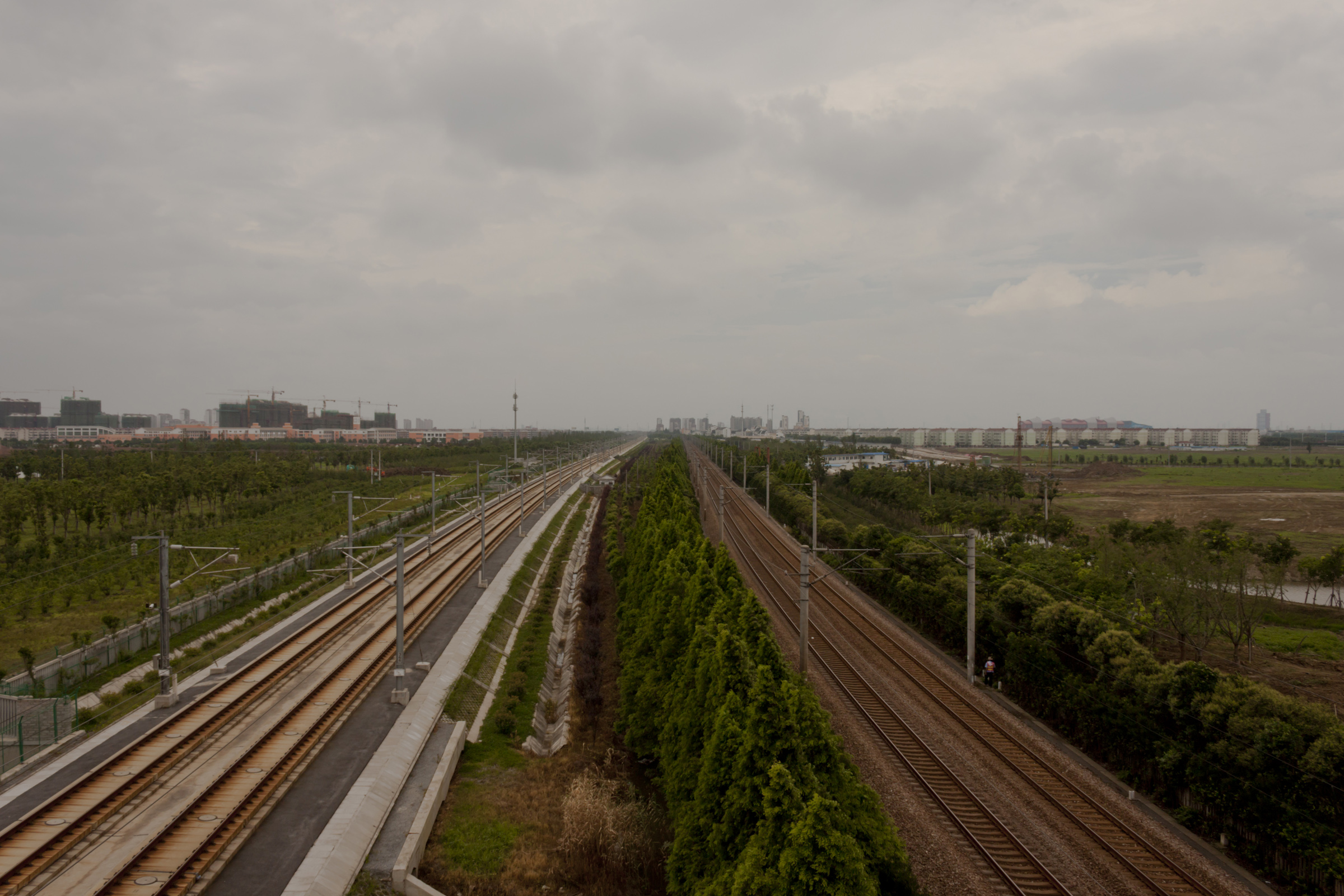
The Shanghai–Nanjing Intercity Railway (left) and the conventional Beijing–Shanghai Railway (right) lines run parallel to each other.

The Shanghai–Nanjing intercity railway or Huning intercity railway (Chinese: 沪宁城际铁路; pinyin: Hù–Níng Chéngjì Tiělù) is a 301-kilometer (187 mi)-long high-speed rail line between Shanghai and Nanjing, the capital of Jiangsu province. Hù and Níng are shorthand Chinese names for Shanghai and Nanjing, respectively. The Huning intercity high-speed railway largely follows the route of the preexisting Nanjing-Shanghai section of the conventional Beijing–Shanghai railway and the Beijing–Shanghai high-speed railway. Construction of this high-speed railway began in July 2008. The line went into test operations in early April 2010, and opened for full service on July 1, 2010. The line has a design speed of 350 km/h (217 mph). The journey time between the two cities has been shortened from 120 minutes to 73 minutes on nonstop trains. According to the arrangements of related departments, 120 pairs of trains are operating on the line, and the time interval between services is 5 minutes at the shortest.

The railway links major cities in the Yangtze River Delta, including Suzhou, Wuxi, Changzhou, and Zhenjiang, effectively making the southern Jiangsu city-belt operate like a single metropolitan region.

The Shanghai–Nanjing intercity high-speed railway is also used by the majority of high-speed trains leaving Shanghai's terminals for Wuhan, Yichang, Chongqing, and Chengdu thus making it de facto a part of the Shanghai–Wuhan–Chengdu passenger-dedicated railway.

== Route ==
To scale map of the Huning HSR

== Stations ==
The Shanghai–Nanjing high-speed railway has 21 stations altogether along its route. In both Shanghai and Nanjing, this railway's trains may use either one of two different terminals (Shanghai railway station or Shanghai Hongqiao railway station in Shanghai, and Nanjing railway station or Nanjing South railway station in Nanjing).

Due to the alignment of the rail line, some stations along it are shared with the conventional Beijing–Shanghai Railway (Shanghai, Suzhou, Zhejiang, Nanjing), while three others are shared with the new Beijing–Shanghai high-speed railway (Shanghai Hongqiao, Kunshan South, Nanjing South). Due to comparatively frequent spacing of stations on the Shanghai–Nanjing high-speed railway, quite a few of them are situated at locations not served by either of the two other railways.

List of stations:

Station	Chinese	Distance (km)	Prefecture-level City	Province / Municipality	Metro transfers
Nanjing	南京	0.00	Nanjing	Jiangsu	1 3
Xianlin	仙林		Nanjing	Jiangsu	
Baohuashan (closed)	宝华山		Zhenjiang	Jiangsu	
Zhenjiang	镇江		Zhenjiang	Jiangsu	
Dantu	丹徒		Zhenjiang	Jiangsu	
Danyang	丹阳		Zhenjiang	Jiangsu	
Changzhou	常州		Changzhou	Jiangsu	1
Qishuyan	戚墅堰		Changzhou	Jiangsu	
Huishan	惠山		Wuxi	Jiangsu	
Wuxi	无锡		Wuxi	Jiangsu	1 3
Wuxi Xinqu	无锡新区		Wuxi	Jiangsu	3
Suzhou Xinqu	苏州新区		Suzhou	Jiangsu	3 6 (u/c); Suzhou Tram Line T2
Suzhou	苏州		Suzhou	Jiangsu	2 4
Suzhou Industrial Park	苏州园区		Suzhou	Jiangsu	3 8 (u/c)
Yangchenghu	阳澄湖		Suzhou	Jiangsu	11 (via Zhengyi)
Kunshan South	昆山南		Suzhou	Jiangsu	
Huaqiao (closed)	花桥		Suzhou	Jiangsu	
Anting North	安亭北		N/A	Shanghai	
Shanghai Hongqiao	上海虹桥		N/A	Shanghai	2 10 17
Nanxiang North	南翔北		N/A	Shanghai	
Shanghai West	上海西		N/A	Shanghai	11 15
Shanghai	上海		N/A	Shanghai	1 3 4

At Shanghai Hongqiao, some trains arriving from Nanjing continue to the Shanghai–Hangzhou High-Speed Railway, providing a one-seat service along the entire Nanjing–Shanghai–Hangzhou line.
