= Shanghai Hongqiao railway station =

Railway station

Shanghai Hongqiao
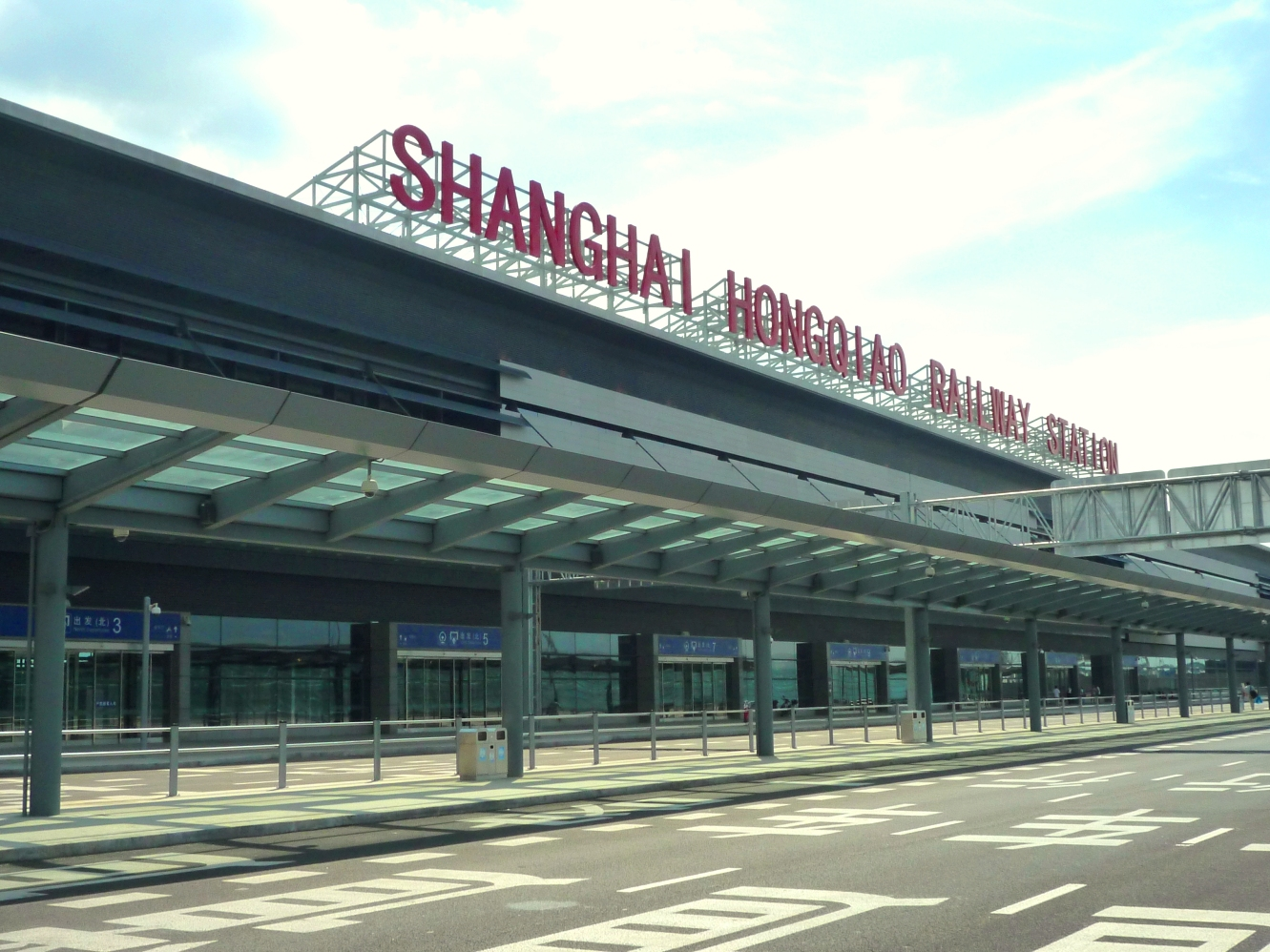

Chinese name
- Simplified Chinese: 上海虹桥站
- Traditional Chinese: 上海虹橋站
Transcriptions
Standard Mandarin
- Hanyu Pinyin: Shànghǎi Hóngqiáo Zhàn

General information
- Location: Shenhong Road, Minhang District, Shanghai; China
- Coordinates: 31°11′46.7″N 121°18′58.1″E
- Operator: China Railway Shanghai Group; China Railway Corporation
- Lines: Shanghai–Nanjing intercity railway; Shanghai–Hangzhou high-speed railway; Beijing–Shanghai high-speed railway; Nantong–Shanghai railway; Shanghai–Huzhou high-speed railway; Jiamin line (under construction); Airport Link line
- Platforms: 30 (14 island platforms, 2 side platforms) for China Railway; 11 (10 island platforms) for Shanghai Metropolitan Area Intercity Railway
- Connections: Hongqiao railway station; Bus terminal; Hongqiao International Airport

Other information
- Station code: 66100 (TMIS code); AOH (telegram code); SHQ (Pinyin code)
- Classification: Top Class station

History
- Opened: 1 July 2010
Location
- Location within Shanghai

Shanghai Hongqiao (simplified Chinese: 上海虹桥站; traditional Chinese: 上海虹橋站; pinyin: Shànghǎi Hóngqiáo Zhàn; Wade–Giles: Shang‑hai Hung‑ch'iao Chan; Shanghainese: Zånhae Ghonjio Zae) is one of the most prominent of the main railway stations in Shanghai, China - the others being Shanghai railway station, Shanghai South railway station and Shanghai Songjiang railway station.

Shanghai Hongqiao railway station, located in Minhang District of Shanghai, is a major part of the Hongqiao Comprehensive Transportation Hub (“the Hongqiao hub”). The station is next to Terminal 2 of Shanghai Hongqiao International Airport and lines 2, 10, and 17 of Shanghai Metro.

== Overview ==
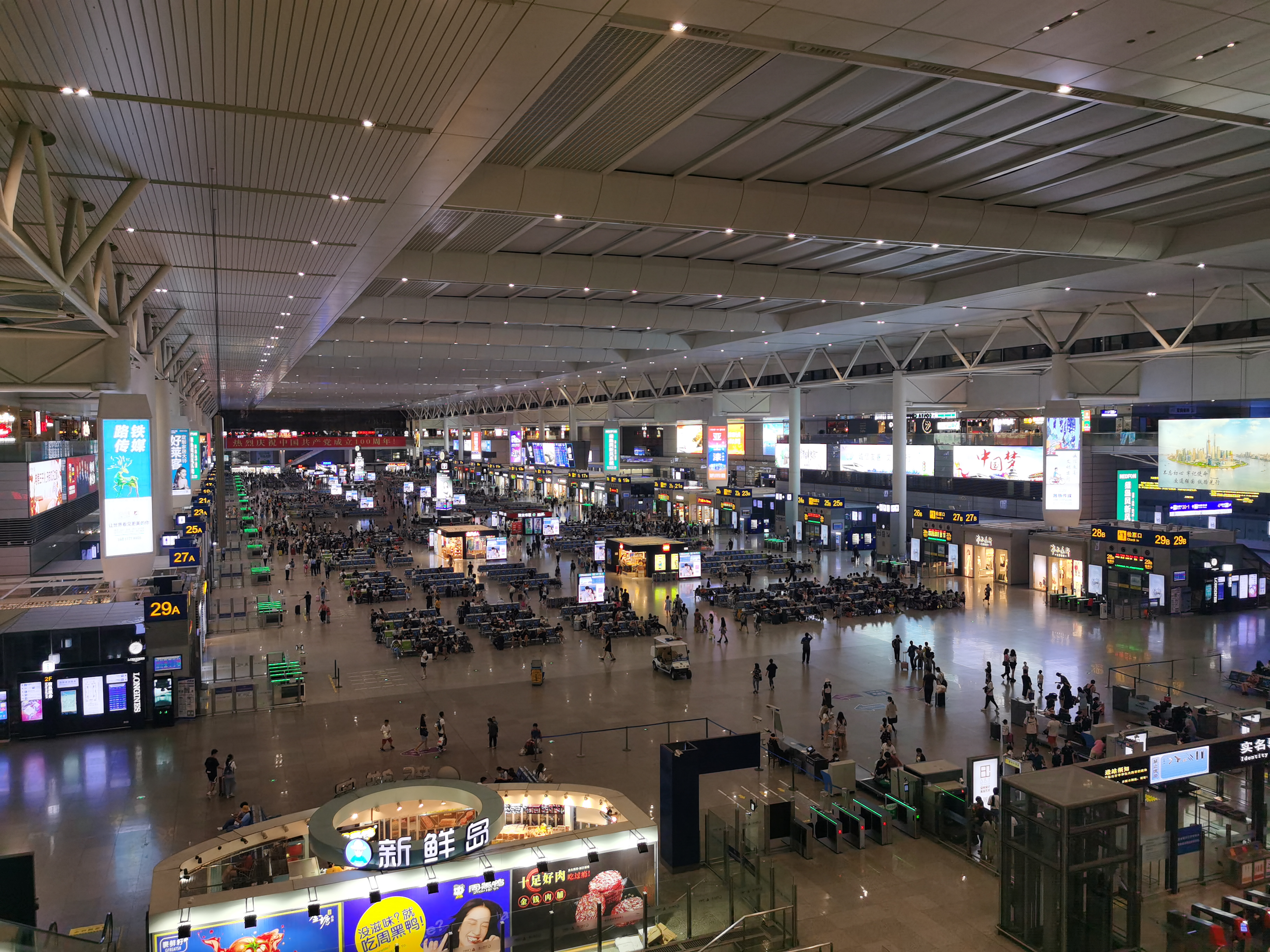
Waiting hall

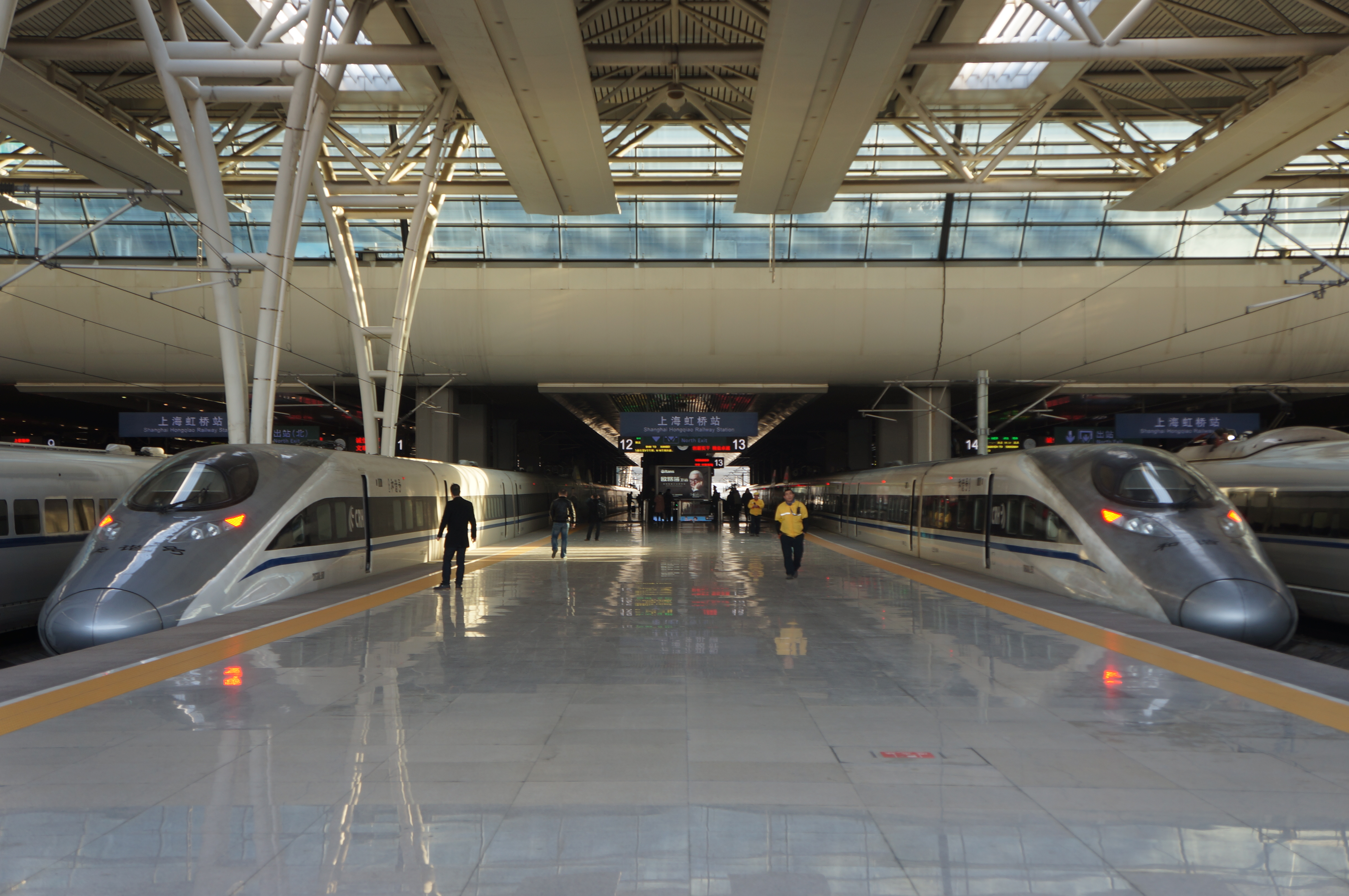
Platforms

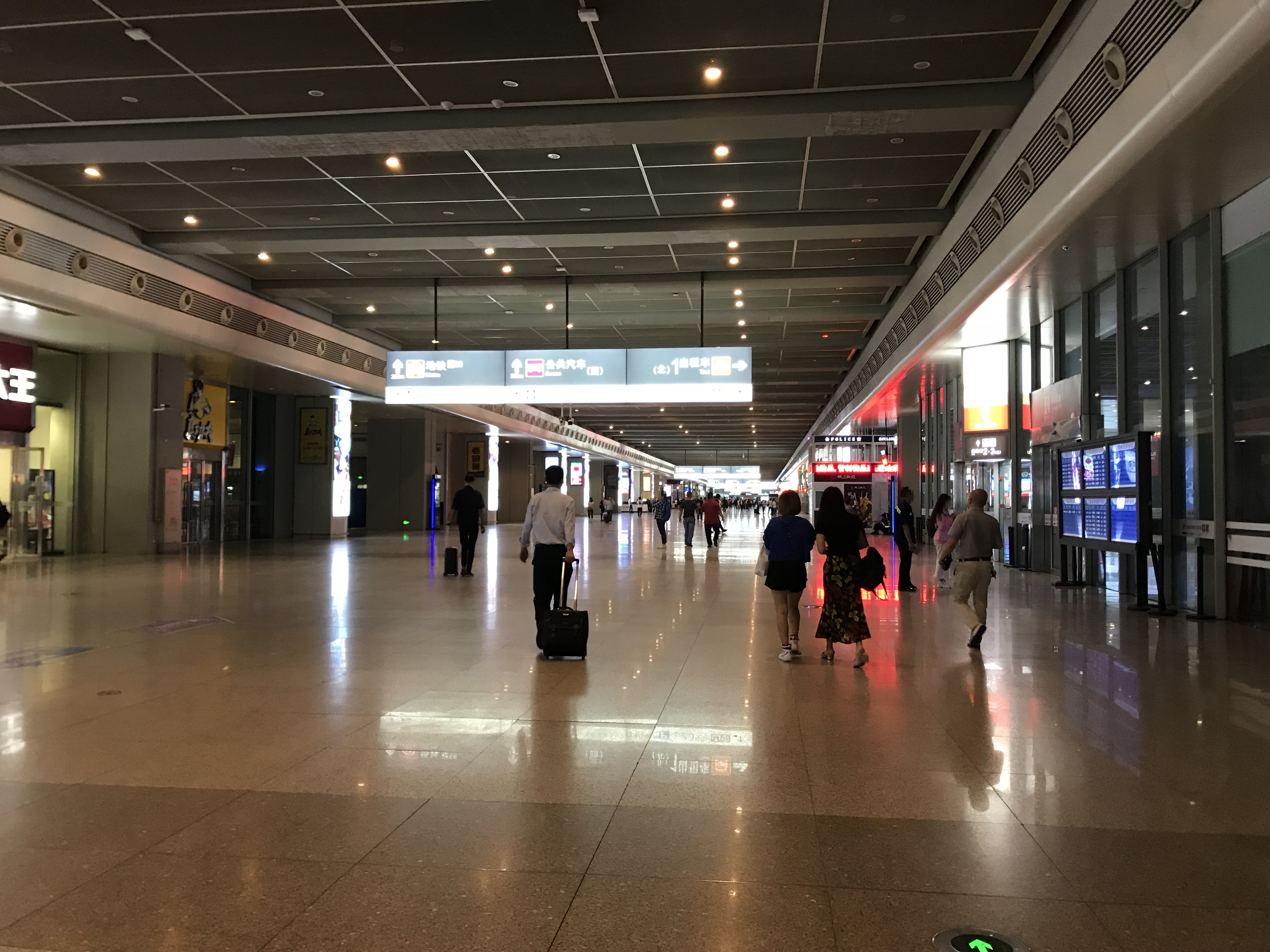
Exit Hall

The construction of the railway station began on 20 July 2008 with a total investment of more than CNY 15 billion ($2.3 billion). It was opened on 1 July 2010, simultaneously with the opening of the Shanghai–Nanjing intercity railway line. The railway station takes a total area of about 1,300,000 square meters (13,993,084 sq ft) and has 16 platforms, most of which are high-speed-rail configuration. The main building of the train station measures 420 metres (1,377 ft 11 in) in length, 200 metres (656 ft 2 in) in width, and 70 metres (229 ft 8 in) high (counting both underground and overground floors). 80,000 tons of steel was used to construct the train station, twice the amount of steel used to build the Beijing National Stadium (Bird nest). The train station waiting hall area is more than 10,000 square meters (107,639 sq ft), and is capable of handling 10,000 passengers at the same time. The station serves 210,000 rail passengers per day.

== Station service ==
The station primarily serves as the Shanghai terminus of several high-speed rail lines, including the Shanghai–Nanjing intercity railway, the Shanghai–Hangzhou high-speed railway (the first section of the Shanghai–Kunming high-speed railway), and the Beijing–Shanghai high-speed railway. As of 2015, all trains departing from Shanghai Hongqiao belong to the G and D classes (interprovincial high-speed services).

Non-high-speed trains from Shanghai to the north and south of China depart from either the main Shanghai railway station for most trains going north, or Shanghai South railway station or Shanghai Songjiang railway station for most trains going south.

== Transportation ==
The station serves the high speed lines:

- Shanghai–Nanjing intercity railway
- Shanghai–Hangzhou high-speed railway
- Beijing–Shanghai high-speed railway
- Nantong–Shanghai railway
- Shanghai–Huzhou high-speed railway

The station will serve the Shanghai Metropolitan Area Intercity Railway lines:

- Jiamin line (under construction)
- Airport Link line
- Jinshan railway (proposed extension)

=== Local traffic ===
Hongqiao Railway Station of the Shanghai Metro is served by Lines 2, 10, and 17. It is also accessible by numerous bus lines and taxi.

== Other aspects ==
A solar system of 20,000 solar panels, with a total area of 61,000 sq m, installed on the awnings of the station, has been described as "the world's largest stand alone integrated photovoltaic (BIPV) project". With the power output of 6.68 Megawatt, the system can produce 6.3 million kilowatt-hours (kwh) of electricity per year.

== Station overview ==
The Shanghai Hongqiao railway station covers 4 floors.

=== Level B1 ===
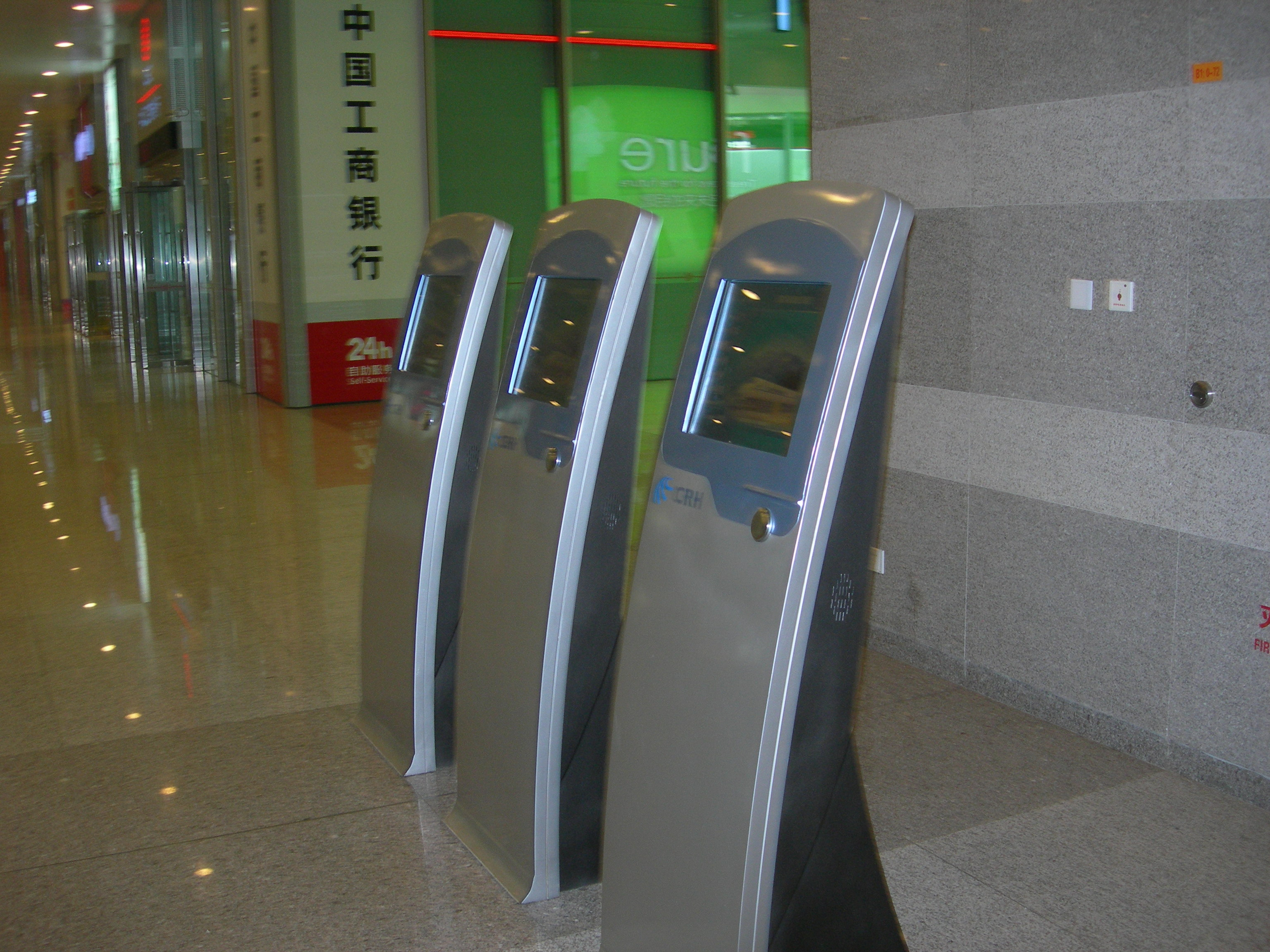
Automated ticket machines on Level B1.

Level B1, the underground level, contains the station exit and connections to other forms of transportation.

Arrivals at all 16 train platforms exit to this level. This level provides access to the Shanghai Metro's Hongqiao Railway Station stop, which is the western terminus of the Main Line of Line 10 and is also served by Line 2 and Line 17. The bus stop and taxi stand are also on this level, and there is an air-conditioned passage to Terminal 2 of Shanghai Hongqiao International Airport, through which it takes about 20 minutes to walk to the airport.

The underground level also provides some fast food, such as KFC, Gongfu, Dongfang Jibai, and shopping, such as Sasa. There are three sets of Automated Ticket Machines and four sets of Ticket Windows.

=== Level 1 ===
Level 1 is where all 30 tracks running through the station are located. Most travellers simply transit through here from Level 2, the departure hall. All trains running on the Jinghu High-Speed Railway, Huhang High-Speed Railway, and the Huning Intercity Rail line wait outside of this level. A few vending machines are located near the escalators.

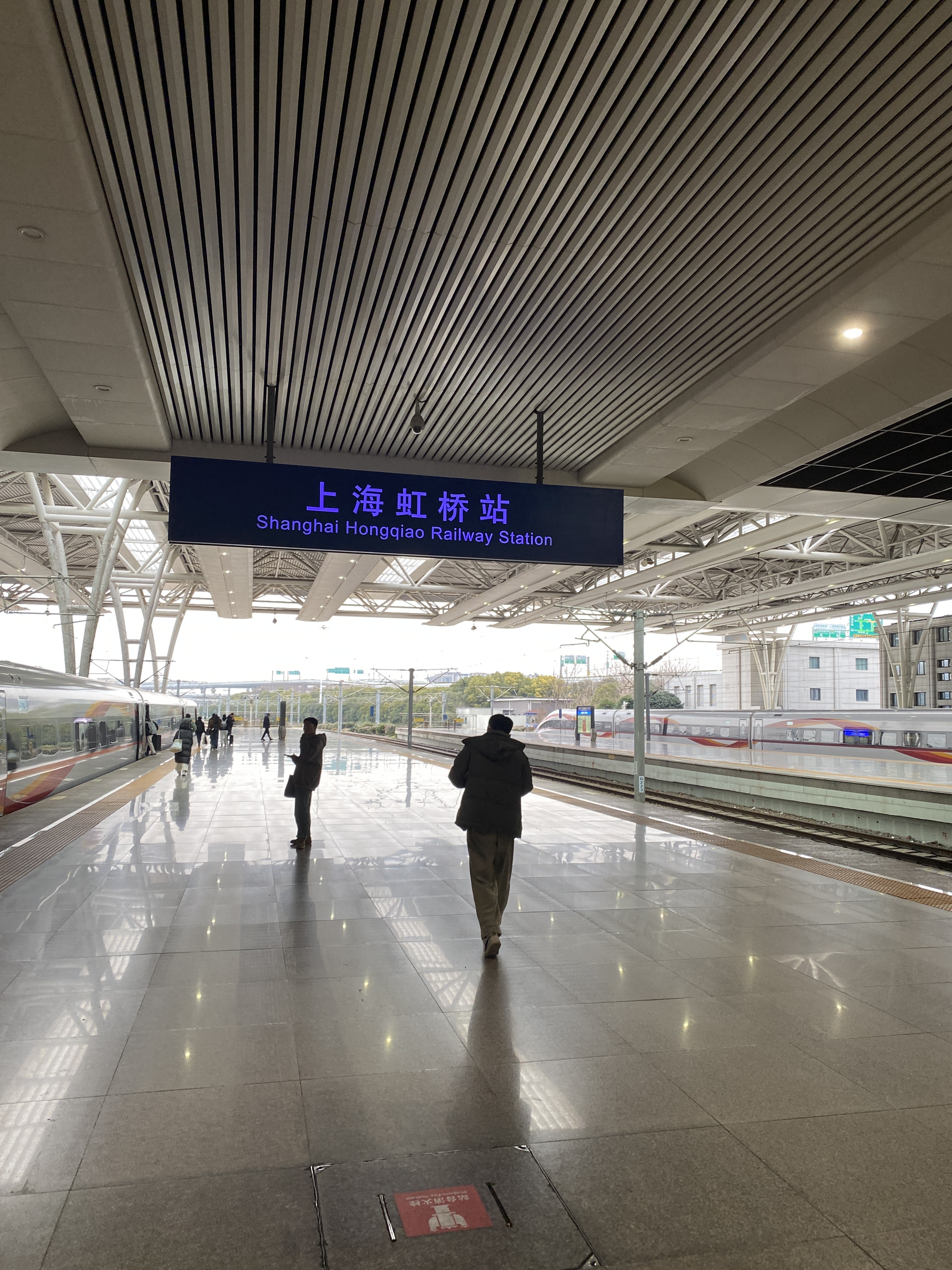
Shanghai Hongqiao Railway Station platform with the Fuxing (train) departing for Dayebei Station as G1728 (left).

=== Level 2 ===
Level 2 contains 3 sets of ticket windows and the massive departure hall. All trains running on the Jinghu High-Speed Railway, Huning Intercity Rail, Huhang high-speed railway lines have their passengers wait in this level. There are also drink vending machines distributed throughout the level.

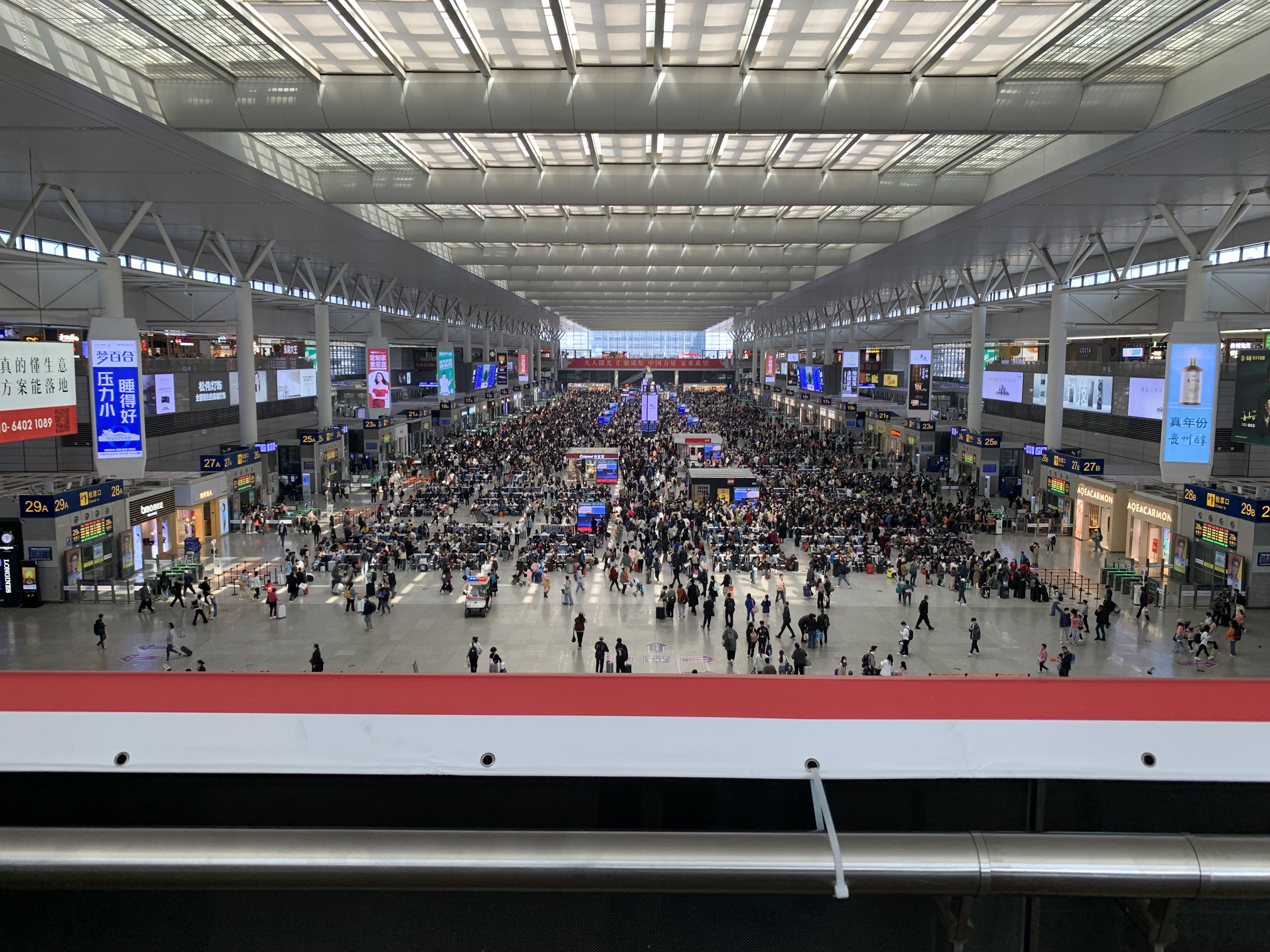
Hongqiao Railway Station Level 2 during Tomb Sweeping Festival

=== Level 3 ===
There are two unconnected parts of Level 3, one above Row A, and the other above Row B. Both offer mostly convenience stores and fast food outlets.

== See also ==
- Shanghai railway station
- Shanghai East railway station
- Shanghai South railway station
- Shanghai West railway station

Preceding station	China Railway High-speed	Following station
Terminus	Shanghai–Nanjing intercity railway Part of the Shanghai–Wuhan–Chengdu passenger-dedicated railway	Anting North towards Nanjing
Kunshan South towards Beijing South or Tianjin West	Beijing–Shanghai high-speed railway Part of the Shanghai–Wuhan–Chengdu passenger-dedicated railway	Terminus
Terminus	Shanghai–Hangzhou high-speed railway Part of the Shanghai–Kunming High-Speed Railway	Songjiang South towards Hangzhou
Terminus	Shanghai–Suzhou–Huzhou high-speed railway	Songjiang South towards Huzhou
