= Beijing–Shanghai railway =

Heavy rail line linking the cities of Beijing and Shanghai, China

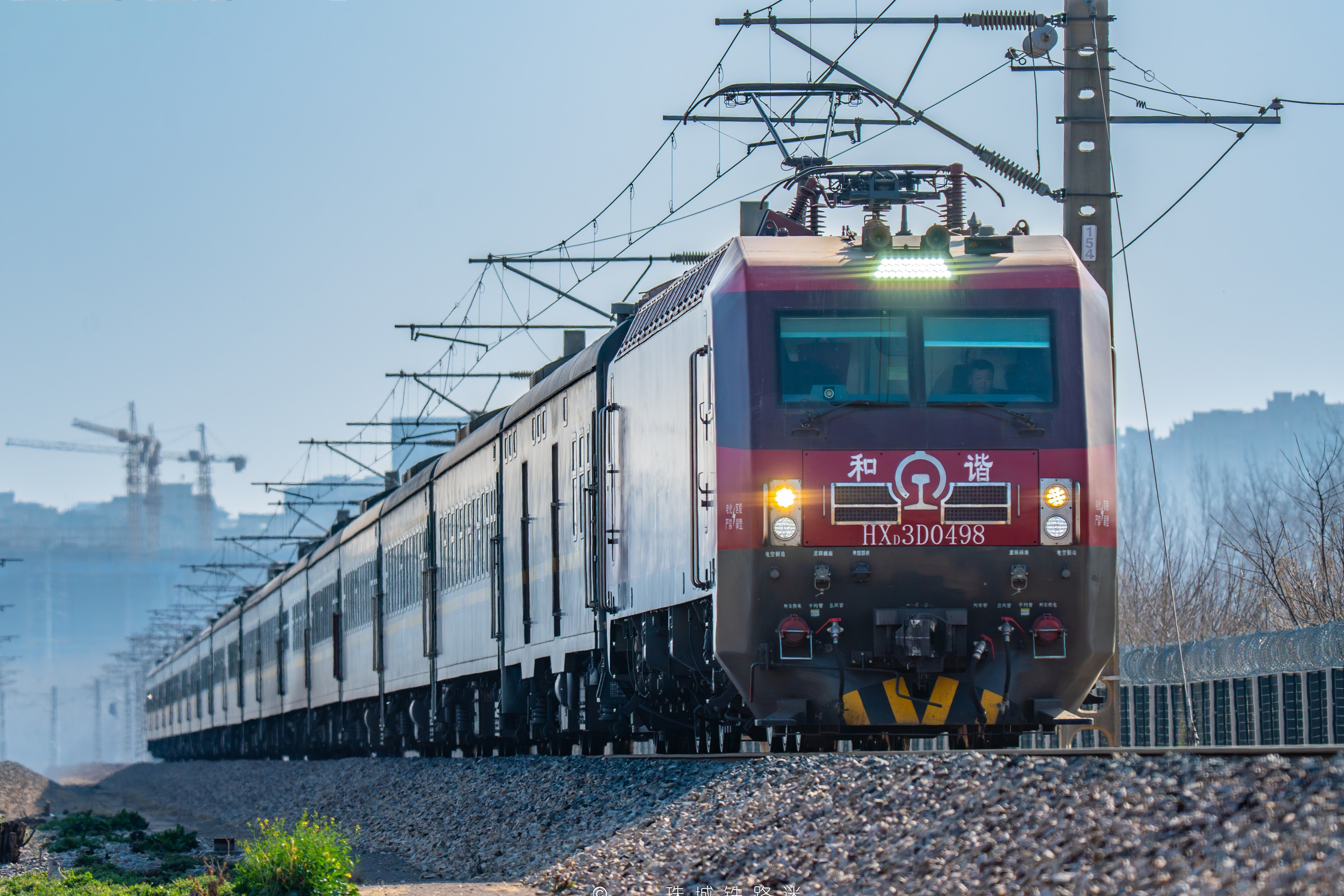
- HXD3D locomotive hauls the train K360 in Bengbu

Overview
- Other name: Jinghu railway
- Native name: 京沪铁路
- Status: Operational
- Owner: China Railway
- Locale: North and East China
- Termini: Beijing; Shanghai
- Stations: 89

Service
- Type: Heavy rail
- Operator(s): China Railway Beijing Group; China Railway Jinan Group; China Railway Shanghai Group

History
- Opened: 1968

Technical
- Line length: 1,451.4 km (901.9 mi)
- Number of tracks: 2
- Track gauge: 1,435 mm (4 ft 8 1/2 in) standard gauge
- Electrification: 25 kV 50 Hz AC overhead catenary
- Operating speed: 160 kilometres per hour (99 mph) (operations); 200–250 kilometres per hour (120–160 mph) (design)
- Signalling: Automatic block signaling

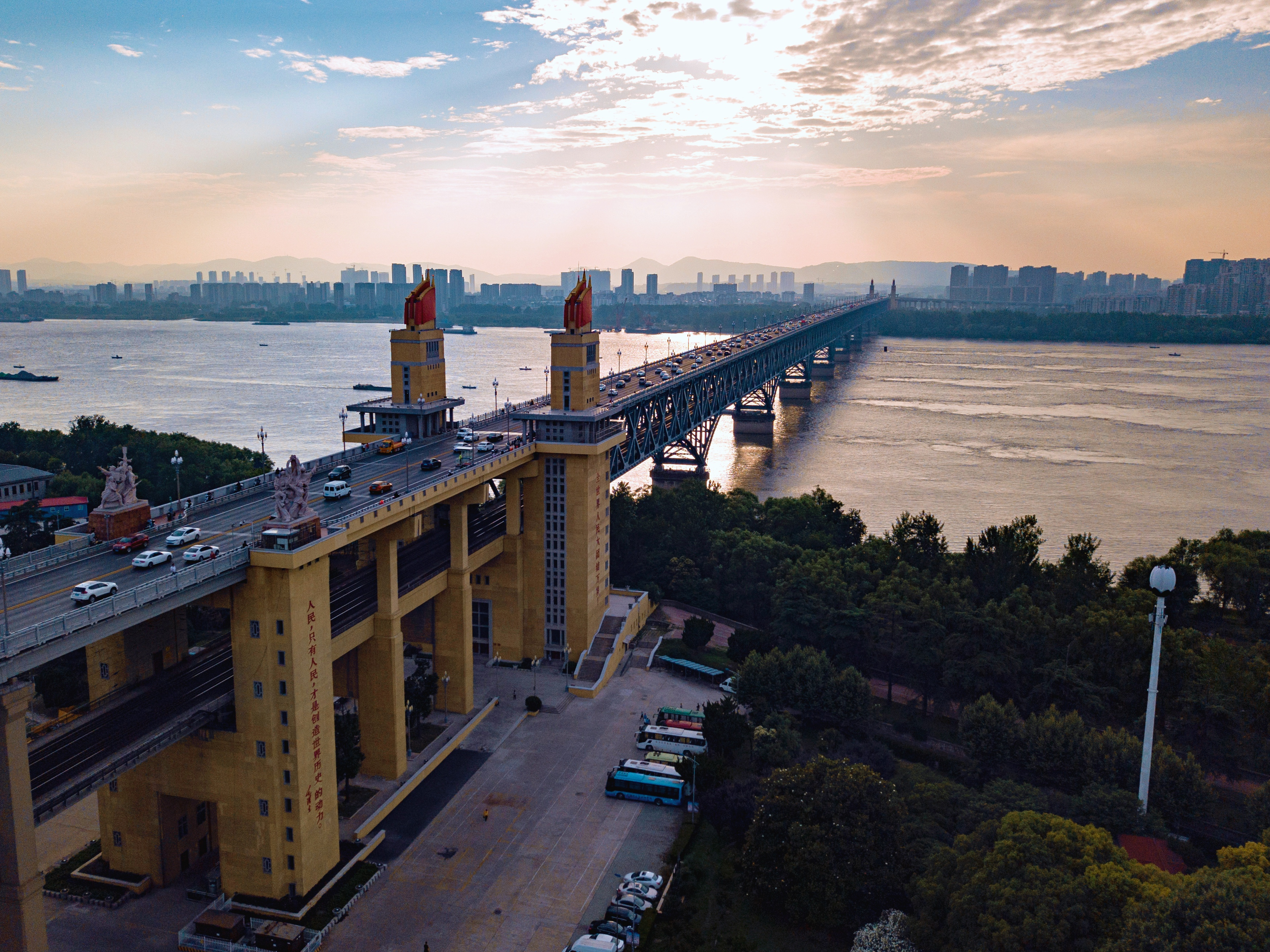
The Nanjing Yangtze River Bridge, an important part of the railway, was opened for traffic in 1968

The Beijing–Shanghai railway or Jinghu railway (simplified Chinese: 京沪铁路; traditional Chinese: 京滬鐵路; pinyin: Jīnghù tiělù) is a railway line between Beijing and Shanghai.

The line has a total length of 1,462 km (908 mi) and connects the municipalities of Beijing, Tianjin, and Shanghai, as well as the provinces of Hebei, Shandong, Anhui and Jiangsu. It is commonly referred to as the Jinghu railway, taking on the abbreviated names of the two terminal cities. In Chinese, Jing means "capital" and refers to Beijing, and Hu is the abbreviated name for Shanghai.

== History ==
The Beijing–Shanghai railway is composed of three sections. These three sections are some of the earliest railways in China, built before 1910 during the Qing dynasty. The first section is from Beijing to Tianjin, constructed as part of the Imperial Railways of Northern China between 1897 and 1900.

The second section is from Tianjin to Pukou – a suburb of Nanjing – and used to be called the Tianjin–Pukou railway.

The third section is from Nanjing to Shanghai, built between 1905 and 1908. This section is called Shanghai–Nanjing railway. During 1927–1949, however, when China's capital was Nanjing, this section alone was called the "Jinghu" railway.

Between Pukou and Xiaguan, the railway crosses the Yangtze River. Before the completion of the Nanjing Yangtze River Bridge in 1968, the trains were ferried across car-by-car. Passengers could also disembark at Nanjing North (Pukou), take a passenger ferry, and take a train again at the then Nanjing main station south of the river (now known as Nanjing West).

After the Nanjing Yangtze River Bridge was completed in 1968, these three sections were linked together and renamed as a single Beijing–Shanghai or Jinghu railway.

In May 2007, electrification of the section between Fuliji railway station and Linchang railway station was completed.

== Current status ==
The railway line is the principal line between Beijing and Shanghai and along with the Beijing–Shanghai high-speed railway, it serves as one of the busiest rail corridors in China. It has dual tracks between Beijing and Shanghai, and the full length of the railway has been electrified. The entire line is dual tracked. Passenger rail service now offers overnight service on CRH Sleepers (D-series trains).

D type express overnight sleeper bullet trains have now commenced operation between Beijing and Nanjing/Shanghai/Hangzhou. There are currently 6 overnight D bullet trains. Overnight Bullet trains take between 9 hours and 23 minutes to 9 hours, 36 minutes between Beijing and Nanjing and were Soft sleeper only but now changed to sleeper first-class and sleeper second-class, which provide better facilities than Soft and Hard sleepers on conventional trains respectively. Some trains also have second-class seat cars.

On June 30, 2011, the Beijing–Shanghai high-speed railway opened and runs roughly parallel to the Beijing–Shanghai railway. The opening of the high-speed railway relieved the Beijing–Shanghai railway from overcrowding, and it's increasingly shifted to freight traffic. As of 2017, two regular trains per day (not including aforementioned overnight sleepers) go the full way from Beijing to Shanghai on the old line, although hundreds of trains still use selected sections of it.

== See also ==
- Rail transport in the People's Republic of China
- List of railways in China
- Stations on the Beijing–Shanghai railway
