= Shanghai railway station =

Railway station in Shanghai, China

Shanghai 上海
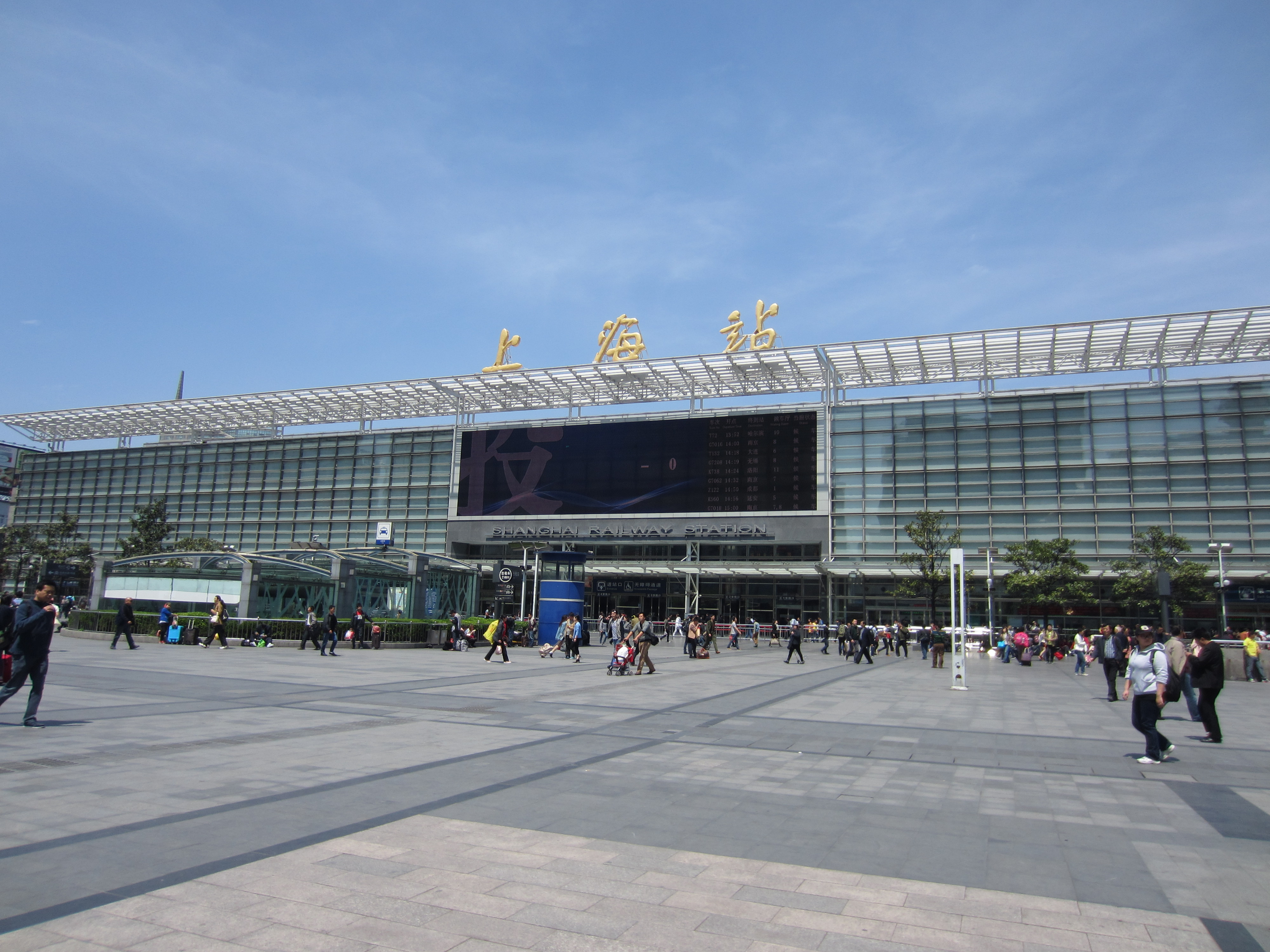
- A view of the Shanghai station's South Plaza

Chinese name
- Simplified Chinese: 上海站
- Traditional Chinese: 上海站
Transcriptions
Standard Mandarin
- Hanyu Pinyin: Shànghǎi Zhàn

General information
- Location: 303 Moling Road, Jing'an District, Shanghai; China
- Coordinates: 31°15′06″N 121°27′02″E
- Operator: CR Shanghai
- Lines: Beijing–Shanghai Railway; Beijing-Shanghai high speed railway Shanghai–Kunming railway Shanghai–Nanjing intercity railway
- Platforms: 13 (6 island platforms, 1 side platform) Side platform for Z99/100 with Customs and Immigration Inspection
- Tracks: 15
- Train operators: China Railway
- Connections: Shanghai Intercity Bus Terminal; Shanghai Metro

Construction
- Structure type: At-grade

Other information
- Station code: 30671 (TMIS code); SHH (telegram code); SHA (Pinyin code)
- Classification: Top Class station

History
- Opened: 1908 (original station); 28 December 1987(current station)
- Closed: 28 December 1987 (original station)
- Rebuilt: 1984
- Former names: Shanghai East (1953–1987)

Passengers
- 2007: 46,000,000

Services
Preceding station	China Railway	Following station
Shanghai West towards Beijing	Beijing–Shanghai railway	Terminus
Terminus	Shanghai–Kunming railway	Shanghai West towards Kunming
Preceding station	China Railway High-speed	Following station
Terminus	Shanghai–Nanjing intercity railway	Shanghai West towards Nanjing
Location
- Location within Shanghai

Shanghai railway station (Chinese: 上海站; pinyin: Shànghǎi Zhàn; Shanghainese: Zånhae Zae) is one of the five major railway stations in Shanghai, China, the others being Shanghai South, Shanghai Hongqiao, Shanghai West (Shanghaixi) and Shanghai Songjiang.

The station is located on Moling Road, Jing'an District, to the north of the city centre. It is governed by Shanghai Railway Bureau and is one of the most important hubs of the railway network in China.

== History and development ==
Shanghai station is called "the new railway station" by locals since it replaced Shanghai North railway station (also known as "Old North railway station", or "Old North Station" - 老北站 by locals) as the city's main train station in 1987. In the late '80s, the old North railway station was inadequate to handle the increasing railway traffic in Shanghai. The government then decided to pull down the Shanghai East (freight) railway station and build a new railway station at the same place. On 28 December 1987, the North railway station was closed. At the same time, the new Shanghai railway station was built and started its operation.

In 2006, some railway lines of the station were moved to the reopened Shanghai South railway station, which lessened the increasing pressure of passenger traffic. In August 2006, a decision was made to renovate the aging station and its surrounding area. Many new ticket machines were installed to increase efficiency.

In June 2008, in order to co-operate with the opening of World Expo Shanghai 2010, Shanghai Government and Zhabei District carried out a new renovation called the "Shanghai Railway Station North Plaza Comprehensive Transportation Hub Project" with a total investment over 4.1 billion RMB.

On May 29, 2010, the renovation was completed. It expanded the north building from 1,000 square meters (10,764 sq ft) to 15,560 square meters (167,486 sq ft), refurbished the south building and added a new designed wave-shaped roof over the platform.

== Connections ==
Most long-haul, non high-speed trains bound for or passing through Jiangsu Province and the North (i.e. destinations north of the Yangtze River) depart from Shanghai railway station. It also offers high-speed CRH trains to major cities north and west of Shanghai, as well as overnight high-speed trains terminating in Beijing and Xi'an.

Platform 5 of Shanghai Railway Station

It is served by the following train types:

- G trains (High-speed Electrical Multiple Unit): Run up to 350 km/h, high speed, mostly between Shanghai and large cities
- D trains (Electrical Multiple Unit): Run up to 250 km/h, between Shanghai and large/small cities. Includes high speed overnight trains
- C trains (Intercity): Run up to 200 km/h, high speed, between Shanghai and regional destinations, such as Nantong and Yancheng
- Z trains (Direct Express): Run up to 160 km/h, between Shanghai and large cities
- T trains (Express): Run up to 140 km/h, between Shanghai and large cities with more stops in between
- K trains (Fast): Run up to 120 km/h, between Shanghai and large cities with most stops in between
- Ordinary trains: Run up to 120 km/h, a single train serves Shanghai. Train 1462/1461 connects Shanghai with Beijing or Beijing Fengtai

== Transportation ==
Shanghai station can be reached by taking Shanghai Metro Line 1, 3 or 4. Due to its pervasive connections with the Shanghai street network, the station is also accessible by numerous bus lines and by taxi. Taxis are not allowed to stop directly in front of the station, but at an underground taxi stop.

== Gallery ==
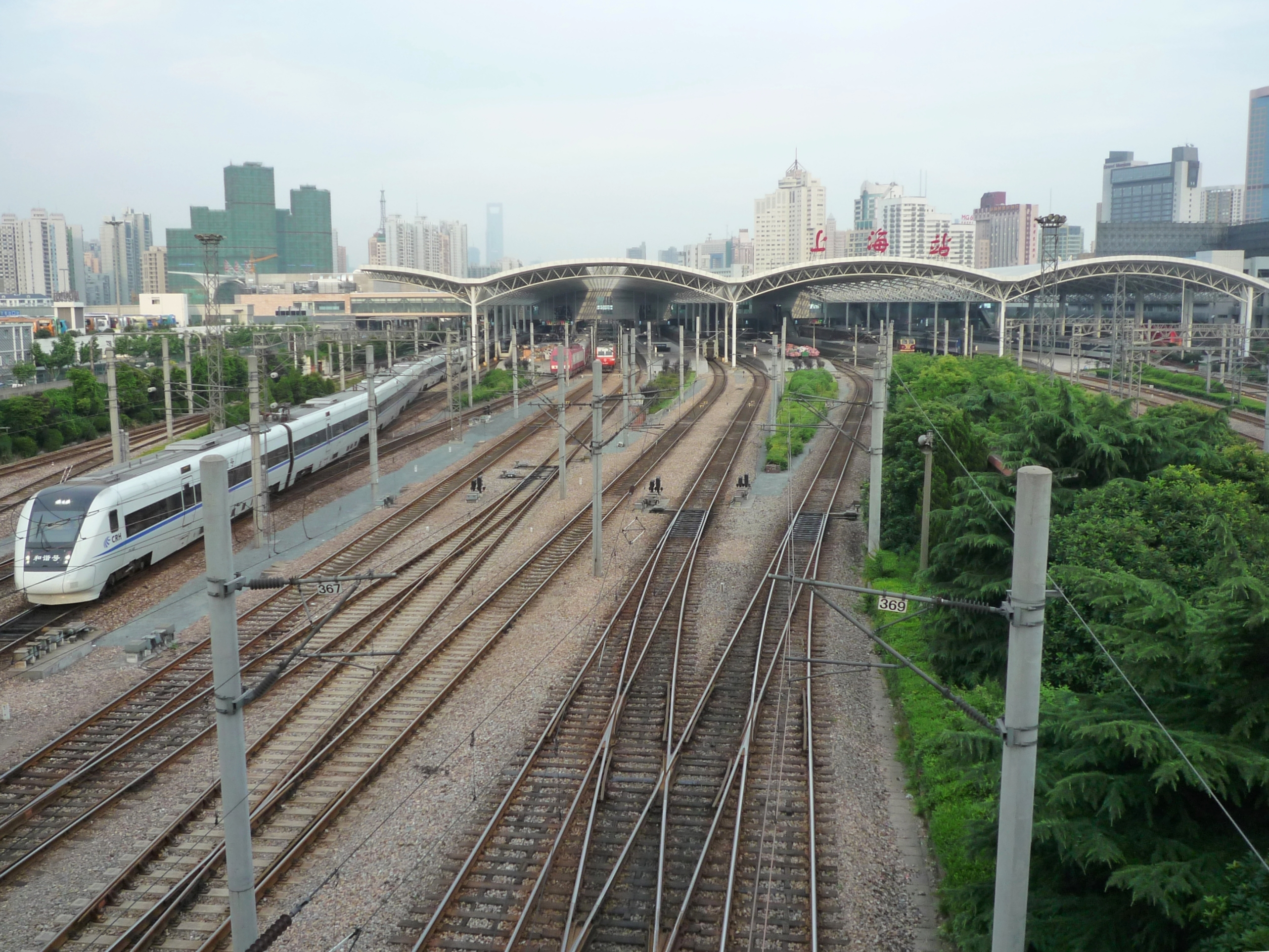
Shanghai station from the west (2010)

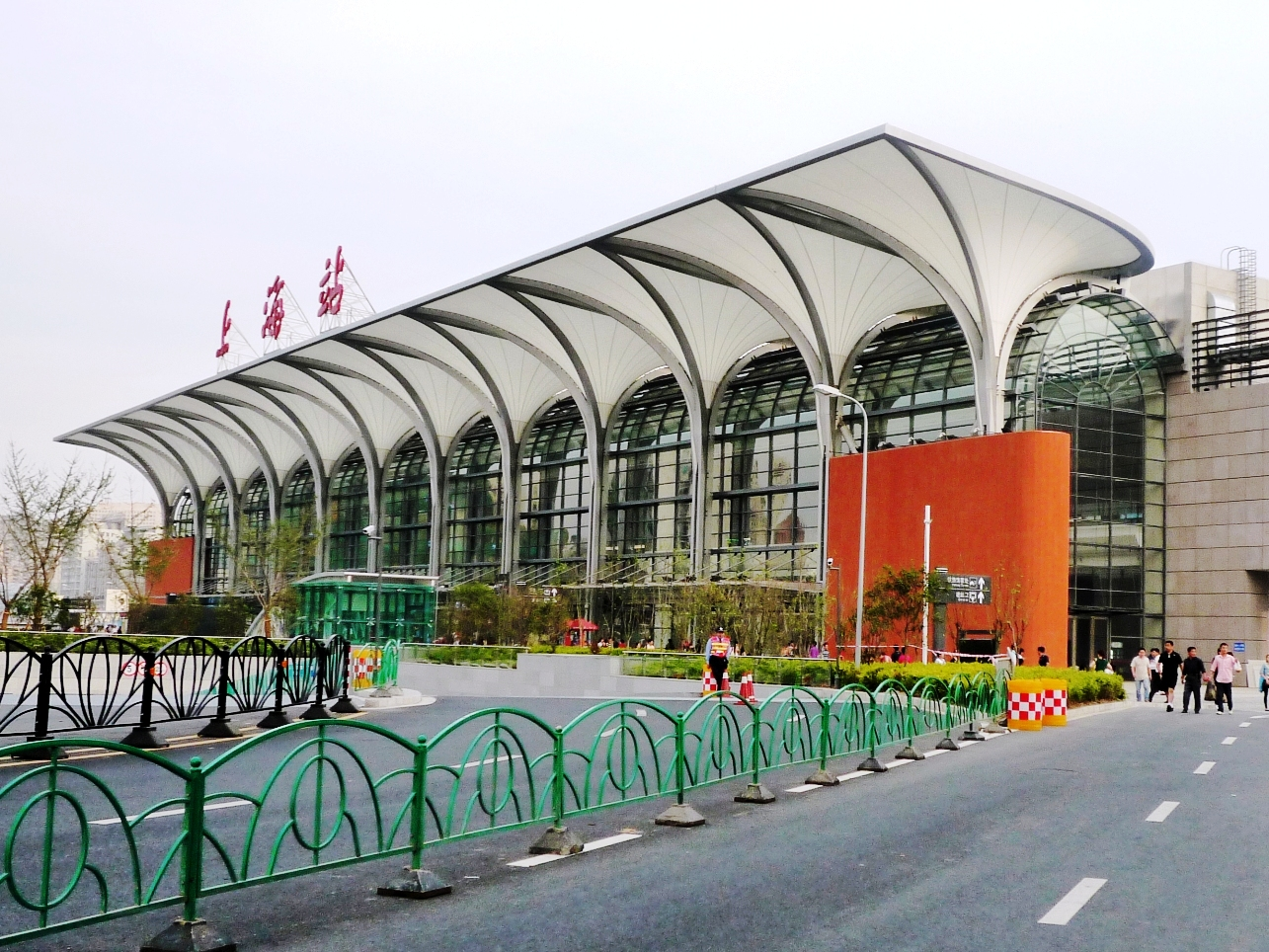
The north plaza of the station (2010)

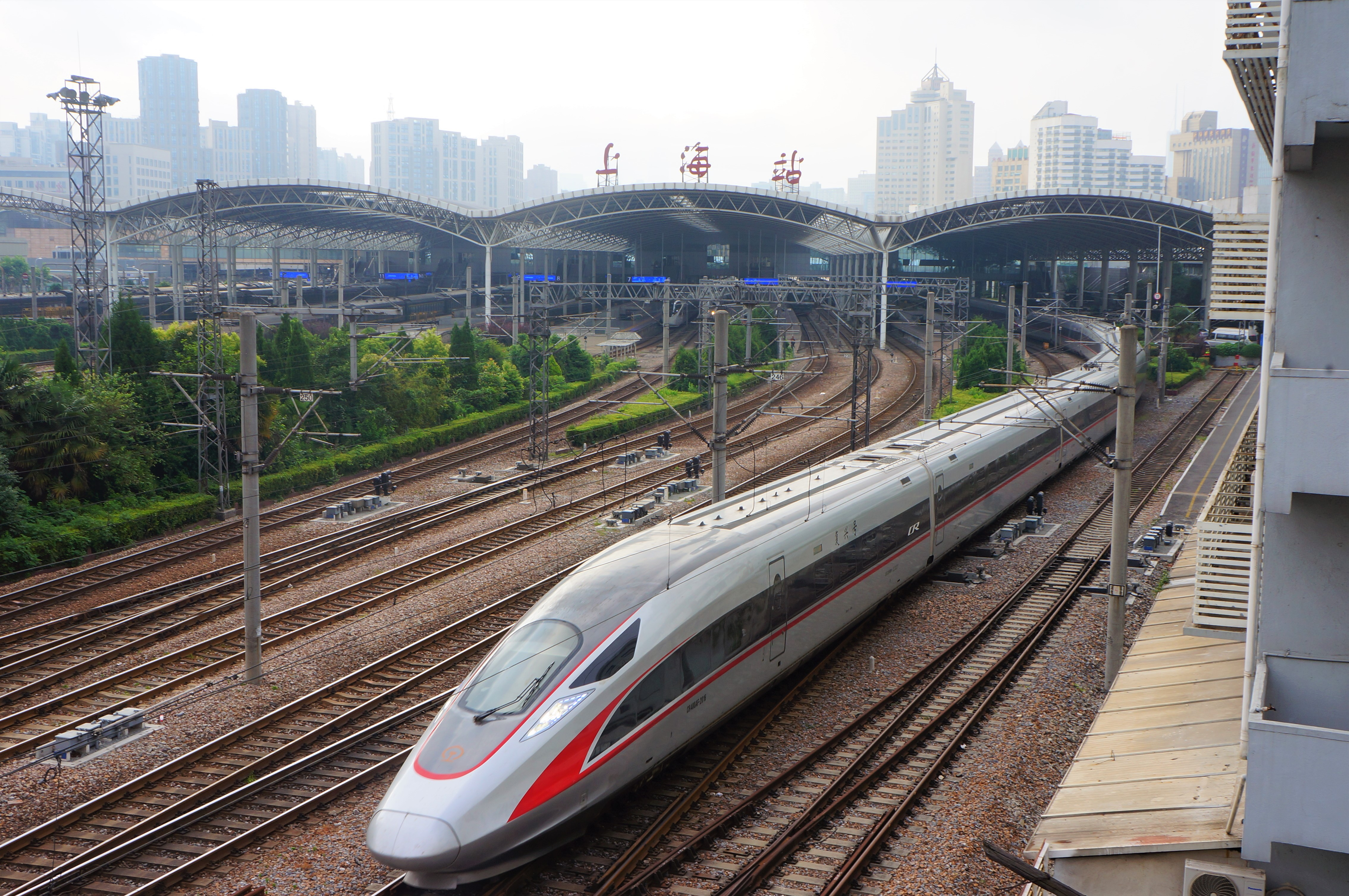
A CR400AF leaves the station (2018)

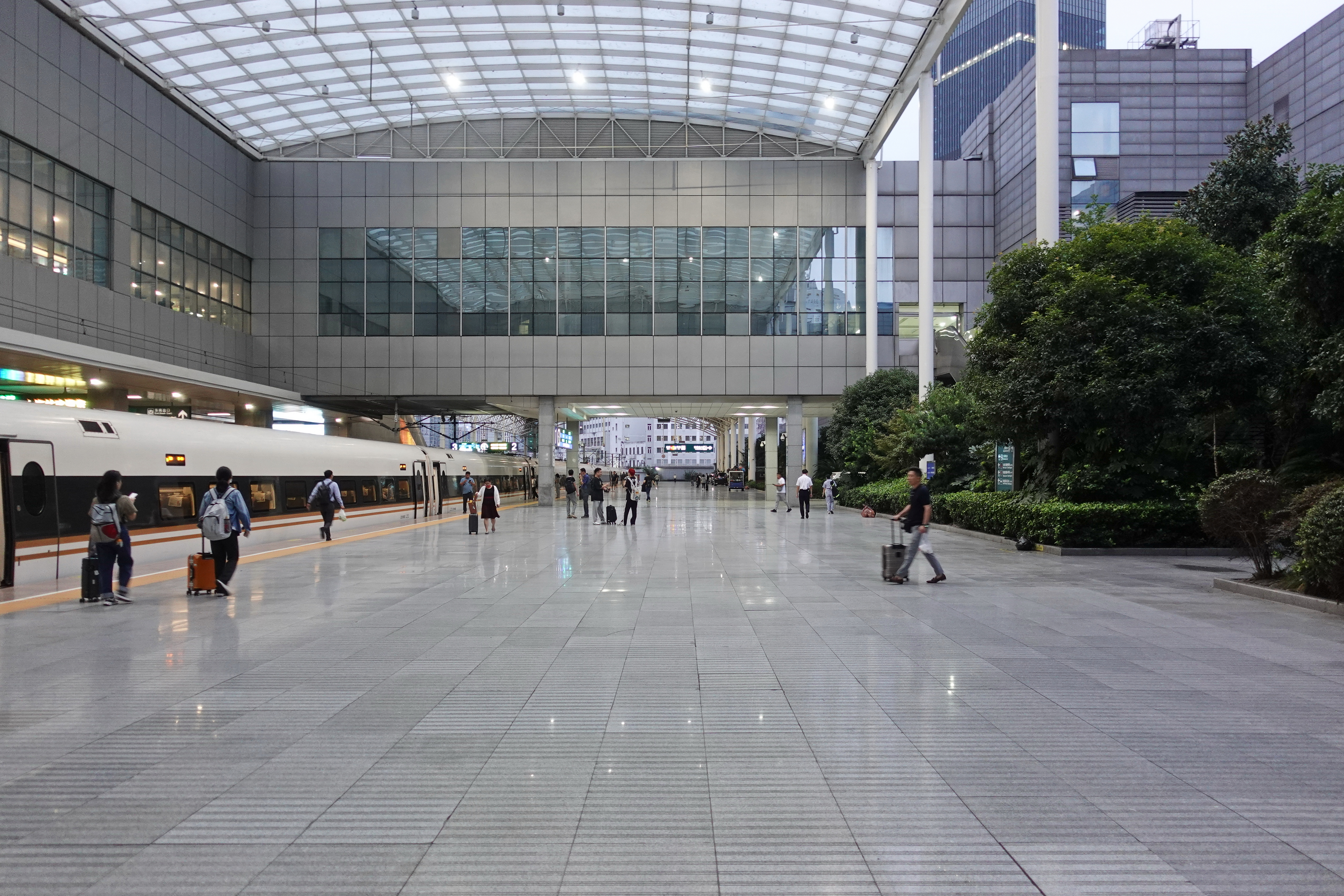
Platform 1（2023）

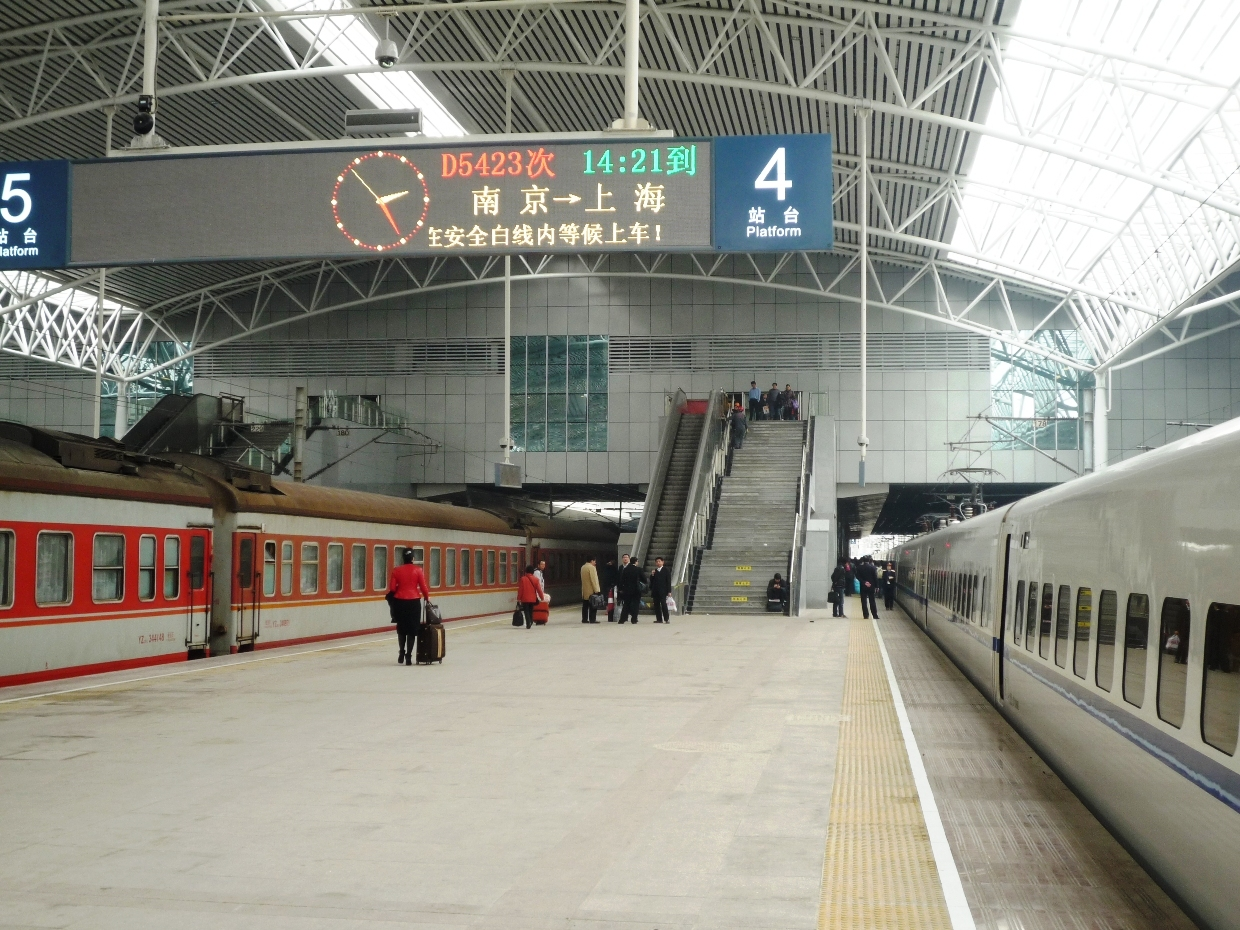
Trains at platforms 4 and 5 (2010)

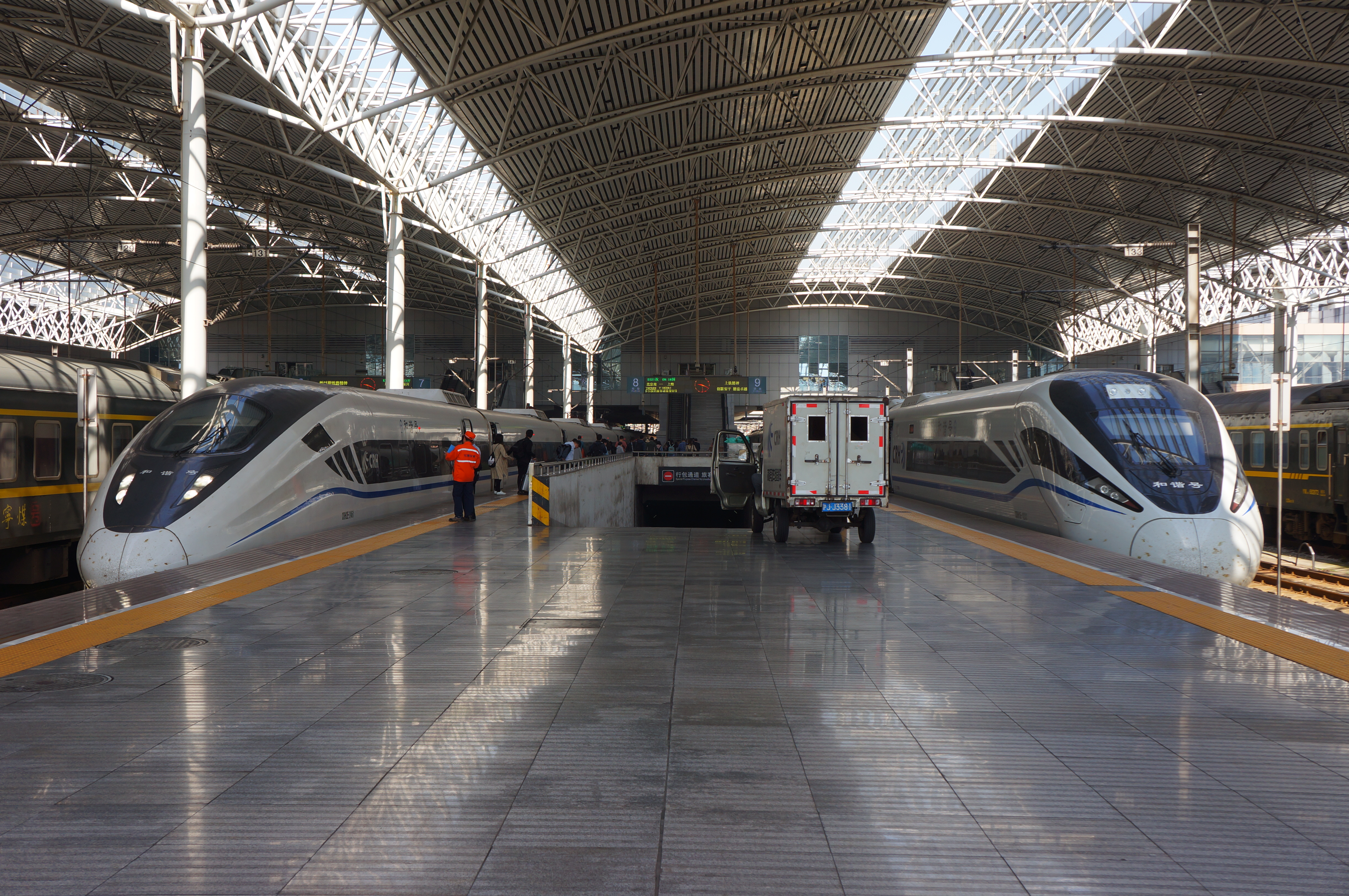
Trains at platforms 8 and 9 (2017)

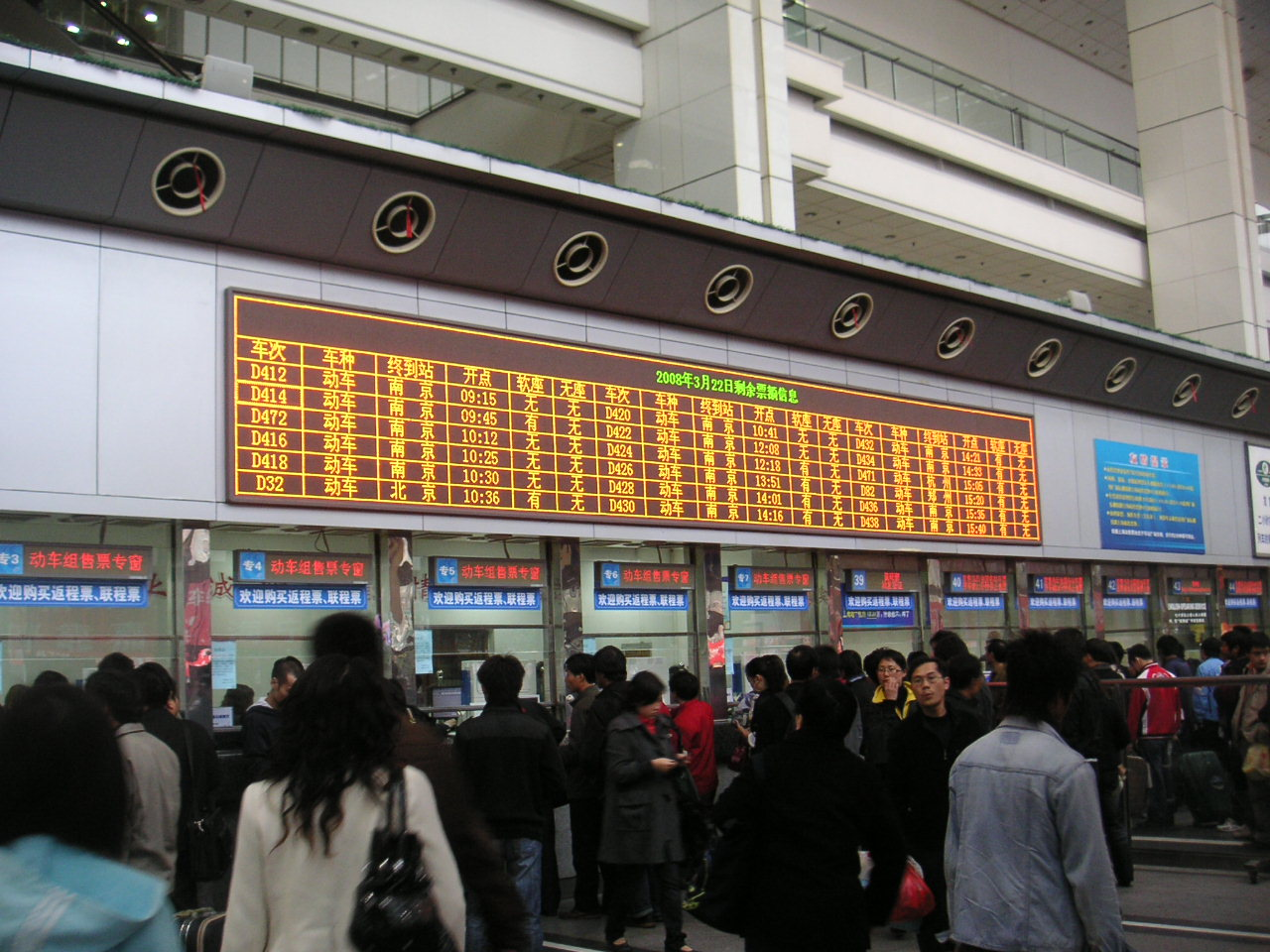
Ticket windows (2008)

== See also ==
- Shanghai Hongqiao railway station
- Shanghai South railway station
- Shanghai West railway station
- Rapid transit in the People's Republic of China
