= Kunshan Hotel =

Hotel in Suzhou, Jiangsu, China

Kunshan Hotel (Chinese: 昆山宾馆) is the only four-star business hotel identified by the China National Tourism Administration in Kunshan, Suzhou region, China. It is located in downtown commercial district of Kunshan. Kunshan borders Shanghai to its east, Suzhou to its west. Its main building was designed by a company overseas, with 259 rooms on 12 floors and a total area of 33,456 square meters.

Nearby attractions include Tinglin Park, Senlin Park and Yufeng Mountain.

== Service ==
From the fourth to the eleventh floor of the main building, there are 196 rooms. The eleventh floor is especially designed for business rooms; the tenth floor is non-smoking and the twelfth floor is for presidential suites.

There is an ala carte dining room on the second floor. The open-style western restaurant on the first floor offers a buffet breakfast, and western dishes for lunch and dinner. There are eight meeting rooms. A dance hall, KTV, sauna, bowling alley, chess and card room and gym are also in service, along with an indoor swimming pool, table tennis room and tennis court, laundry center, etiquette center, consultant and management center.
