= Kunshi =

Dolomite from Kunshan, China

Kunshi (Chinese: 昆石; pīnyīn: kūnshí), also known as Kūnshānshí, Línglóngshí (Chinese: 玲珑石), is a type of dolomite originating from the Yufeng Mountain, which is also known as Mǎ'ān Mountain in Kunshan. It is distinctive and natural, and also called Qiǎoshí (巧石).

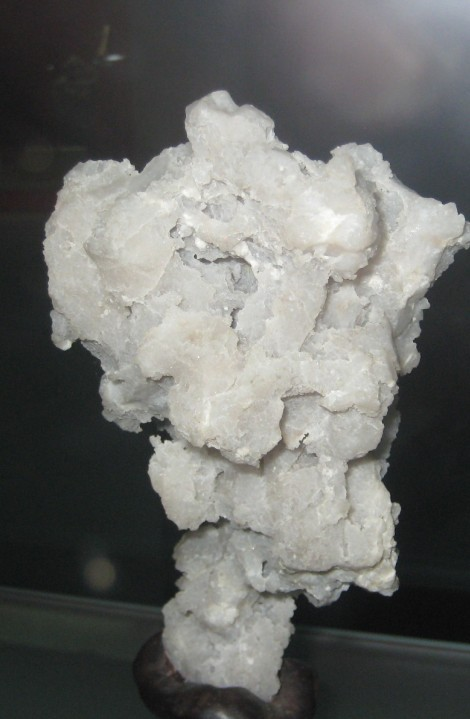
a kind of common shape

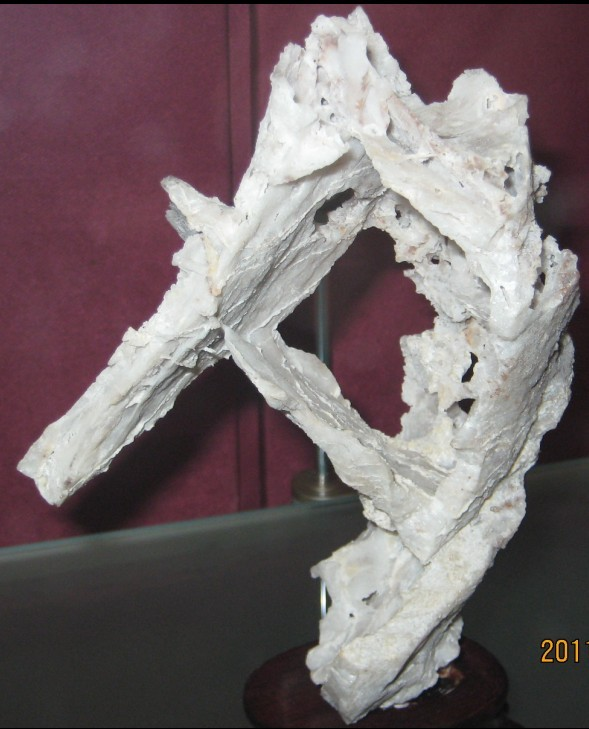
a special shape of Kunshi

== History ==
The exploitation, appreciating and collection of Kunshi can be traced back to the Han dynasty, which was more than 2200 years ago. The ancients were honored by having kunshi and they used kunshi as materials to write poetry and articles.

Kunshi, Taihu Stone and Yuhua Stone are named as three famous stones in Jiangsu. And the exploitation of kunshi has continued for more than one thousand years. It has a snow-white outward appearance and gives people a feeling of purity, but it's rarely exploited. Kunshi is treated in the top grade among all the tributes from the Song dynasty.

== See also ==
- Gongshi
- Suseok
- Suiseki
