= Chongyuan Temple =

Buddhist temple in Suzhou, Jiangsu, China

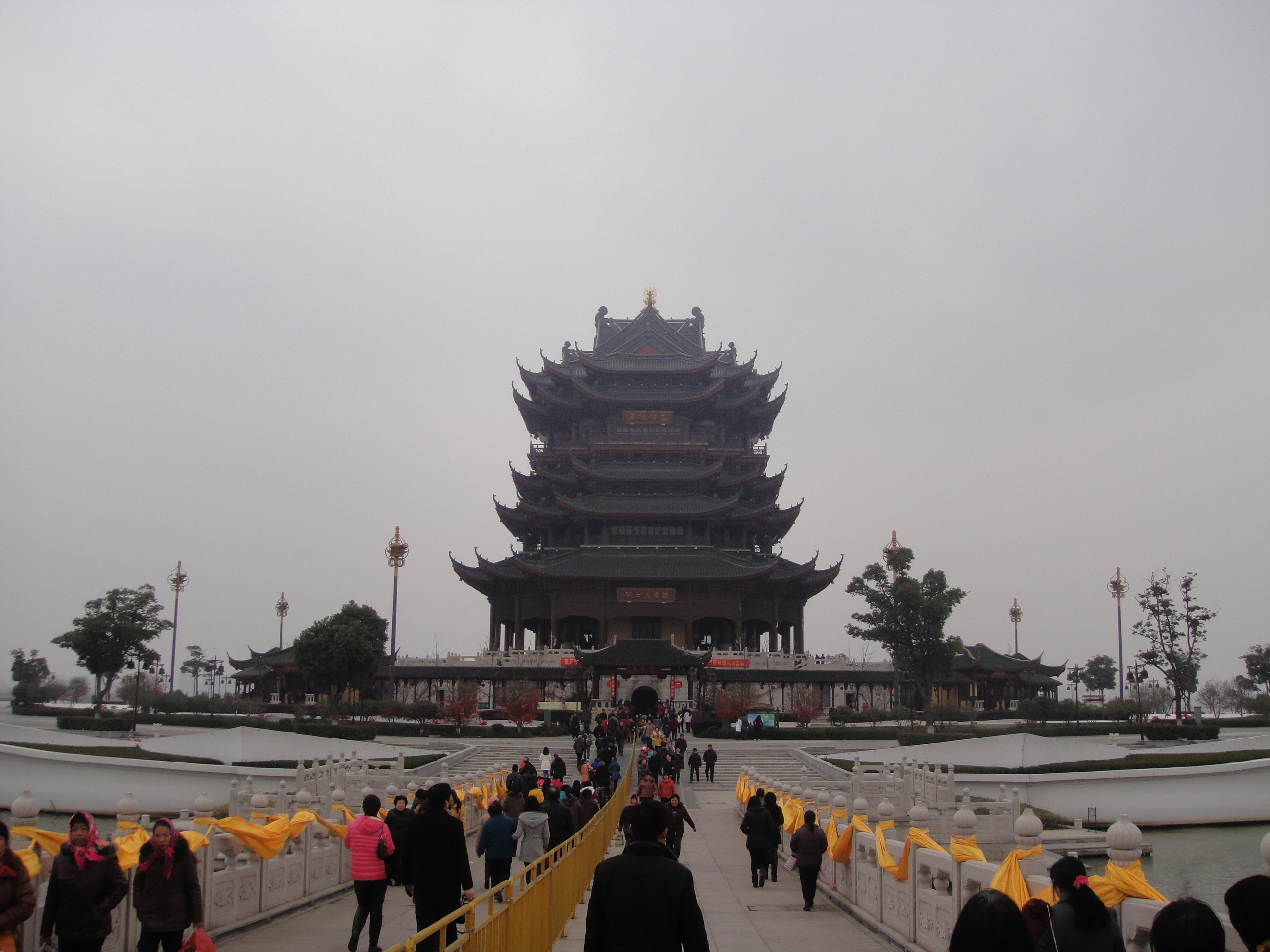

- Location in China

Religion
- Affiliation: Buddhism

Location
- Location: Suzhou Industrial Park, Suzhou, China
- Country: China
- Interactive map of Chongyuan Temple
- Coordinates: 31.406813°N 120.7801666°E

Chongyuan Temple (Chinese: 重元寺; pinyin: Chóngyuán Sì) is a Liang Dynasty Buddhist temple located along Yangcheng Lake at Suzhou Industrial Park, Suzhou, China.

== History ==
The original Chongyun Temple was built in the 6th century during the reign of Emperor Wu of Liang. On its inauguration, the second character was mistaken for xuan and so the temple was officially named Chongxuan. The temple was ransacked under the reign of Emperor Wuzong of Tang during the Great Anti-Buddhist Persecution and the building was later rebuilt under Qian Liu. The temple was destroyed by a fire in the 14th century, but again repaired. During the reign of the Kangxi Emperor, the temple gained its present name Chongyuan so as not to bear the same name as the emperor - whose personal name was Xuanye.

In the mid-20th century, Chongyuan Temple was destroyed during the Cultural Revolution. In 2003, the Jiangsu provincial government approved the reconstruction of Chongyuan Temple and the rebuilt temple opened on November 17, 2007. At the time of its opening the temple's main hall was both the largest (2,400 m^{2} (26,000 ft^{2})) and highest (38 m (125 ft)) main temple hall in China. A 33-metre (108 ft) gilded bronze statue of Guanyin stands within the hall structure.

In 2010, the temple was upgraded to a national 4A level tourist attraction.
