= Kunshan railway station =

Railway station in Kunshan, China

Coordinates: 31.3681°N 120.9533°E

Kunshan 昆山
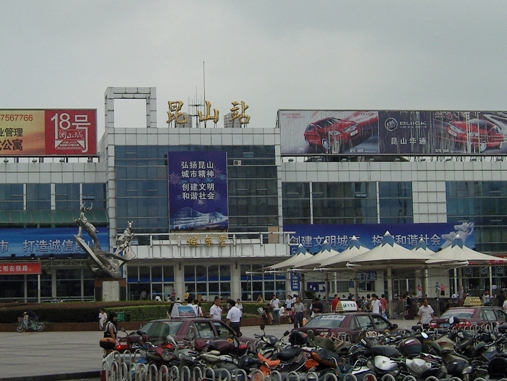
- Kunshan railway station

General information
- Location: Renmin Road, Yushan Town, Kunshan, Suzhou, Jiangsu; China
- Operated by: Shanghai Railway Bureau, China Railway Corporation
- Line: Jinghu railway
- Platforms: 4

History
- Opened: 1905
Location

Kunshan railway station (simplified Chinese: 昆山站; traditional Chinese: 崑山站; pinyin: Kūnshān zhàn) is a railway station of Jinghu railway. The station is located Kunshan, Suzhou, Jiangsu, China. The station opened in 1905.

Preceding station	China Railway	Following station
Suzhou towards Beijing	Beijing–Shanghai railway	Anting towards Shanghai
