= Penglang =

Coordinates: 31°22′12.69″N 121°04′46.64″E

Penglang (Chinese: 蓬朗) is a Chinese town in the eastern edge of Kunshan. It is associated with the southern suburbs of Taicang and the Jiading District of Shanghai. Penglang occupies 35 square kilometers. It is composed of three administrative villages and four communities. The resident population is 22,049 and the shack population is 67,045.

== Transport ==
The highway net leads in all directions. It passes through the southern east–west road of Kun Ka Road, the main road of 204 national highway and the Shanghai Jiading Expressway.

== Economy ==
The district has Ivo (Kunshan), Konka Electronics (Kunshan), Kenda industry Co., and more than 550 other enterprises and institutions. Kunshan Economy and Technology Development Zone positions Penglang as "the future of eastern Kunshan industrial service life and the important model of the city, also the important industry upgrade and developmental space base".

== Culture ==
Penglang has a long history. It began in the Song dynasty. The famous educator HuShiyu, is from Penglang, who was the teacher of Ye Shengtao. Penglang also has other notables, such as Fanghuan, politician and educator and a poet, Zhangyong.
