= Kunshan Forest Park =

Urban park in Kunshan, China

Coordinates: 31.396°N 120.908°E

Kunshan City Ecological Forest Park
- 昆山城市生态森林公园
- Interactive map of Kunshan City Ecological Forest Park
- Type: Urban park
- Location: Kunshan, Jiangsu, China
- Area: 166 hectares (410 acres)

Kunshan Forest Park is an urban park in Kunshan, China. Built in 2001, the 166 hectare park is located in the northwest of the city, near Duke Kunshan University. The park was designed by PLAT Studio, a California-based landscape architecture firm.
