= Suzhou railway station =

Railway station in Suzhou, China

Suzhou 苏州
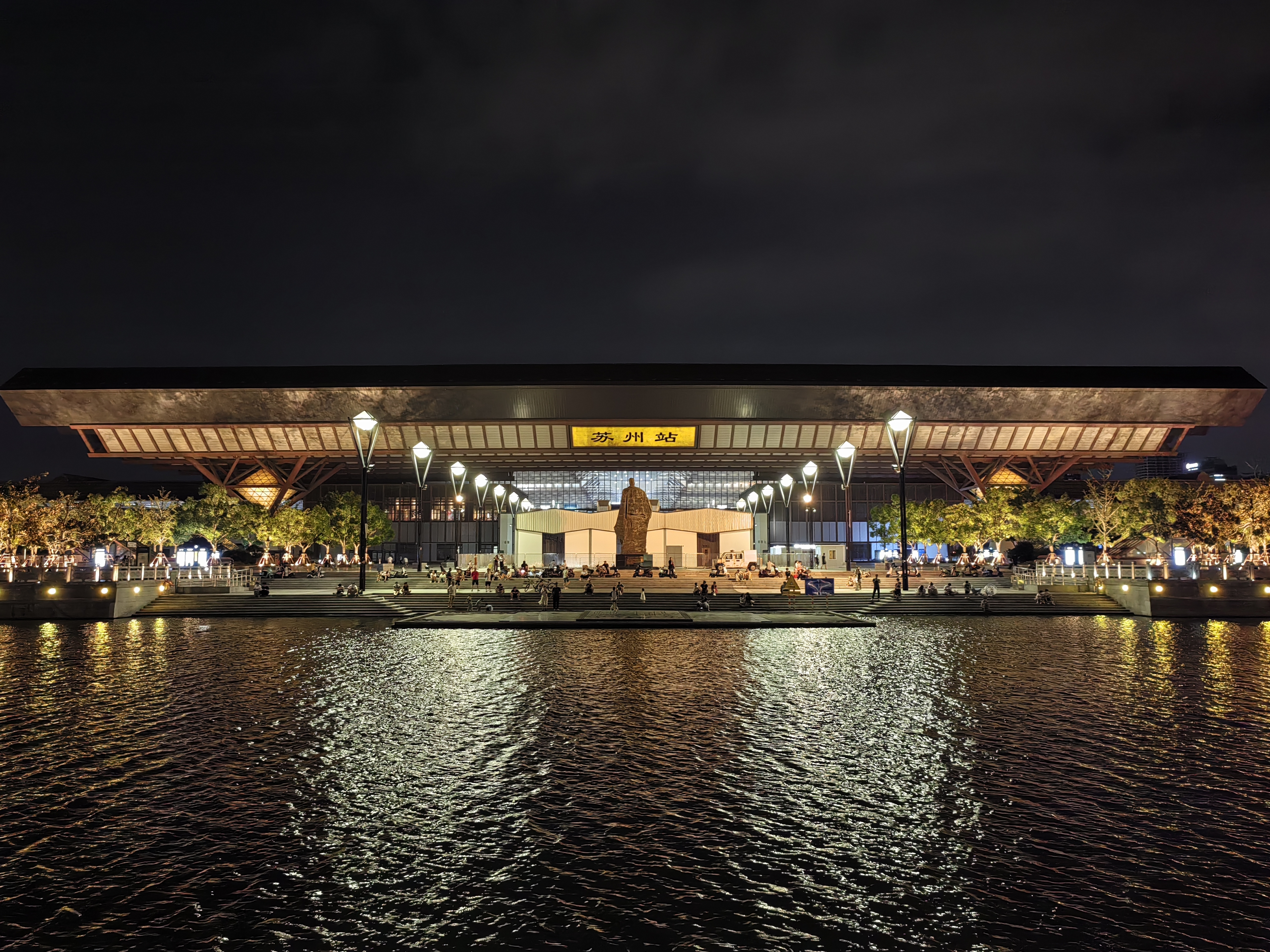
- Suzhou railway station

Chinese name
- Traditional Chinese: 蘇州站
- Simplified Chinese: 苏州站
Transcriptions
Standard Mandarin
- Hanyu Pinyin: Sūzhōu zhàn

General information
- Location: 27 Suzhan Road, Gusu District, Suzhou, Jiangsu; China
- Coordinates: 31°19′50″N 120°36′23″E
- Operator: Shanghai Railway Bureau, China Railway Corporation
- Lines: Jinghu railway, Shanghai–Nanjing intercity railway
- Platforms: 7
- Connections: Bus terminal

Other information
- Station code: TMIS code: 30530; Telegraph code: SZH; Pinyin code: SZH
- Classification: 1st class station

History
- Opened: 1906
- Former names: Wuxian Railway

Passengers
- 100,000 daily
Location

Suzhou railway station (simplified Chinese: 苏州站; traditional Chinese: 蘇州站; pinyin: Sūzhōu zhàn) is a railway station of Jinghu railway and Shanghai–Nanjing intercity railway. The station is located in Suzhou, Jiangsu, China.

== History ==
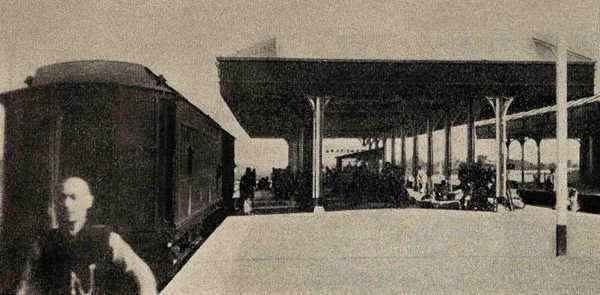
Suzhou railway station in 1908

The station opened on July 16, 1906. The station's area was only 205 square metres.

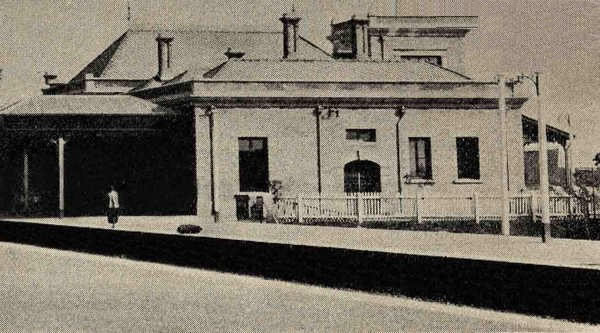
Platform in 1915

In May 1936, the station's name changed to "Wuxian railway station" because Suzhou's name changed to Wuxian (吴县). In December 1937, the station changed back to "Suzhou Station" due to the Japanese invasion.

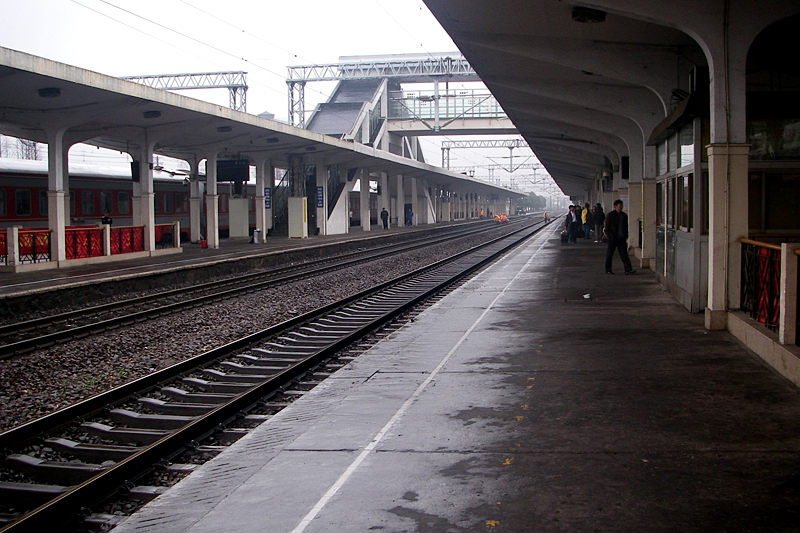
Old platform

Since July 1, 2010, Shanghai–Nanjing intercity railway has been in operation; some trains from Suzhou to Shanghai take only 24 minutes. The upgrade of the station was completed with the opening of the south plaza on 5 February 2013. The upgrade included the opening of a public bus hub. The metro station was opened with Suzhou Rail Transit line 2 was opened on 28 December 2013; metro line 4 was opened on 15 April 2017.

== Rail services ==
Suzhou station has 12 platform faces on five island platforms and two side platforms; one island platform has only one face. The original railway uses seven platform faces and three passing tracks. The intercity railway uses five platform faces and two passing tracks.

Suzhou station is served by seven services originating at the station:

Railway bureau	Destination	Service number
Nanchang Group	Nanchang	T28
Shanghai Group	Shanghai	G7209/G7213
Shanghai Group	Taizhou West	G7503
Taiyuan Group	Taiyuan South	D1668
Taiyuan Group	Linfen	K2666
Xi'an Group	Yulin	K1324 (not in low season)

On some holidays, temporary EMUs start from or end at this station.

== See also ==
- Suzhou North railway station—on the Beijing–Shanghai High-Speed Railway, 10.5 km away from the Suzhou railway station
- Statue of Fan Zhongyan

Preceding station	China Railway High-speed	Following station
Suzhou Industrial Park towards Shanghai or Shanghai Hongqiao	Shanghai–Nanjing intercity railway Part of the Shanghai–Wuhan–Chengdu passenger-dedicated railway	Suzhou New District towards Nanjing
Preceding station	China Railway	Following station
Wuxi towards Beijing	Beijing–Shanghai railway	Kunshan towards Shanghai
