= Jinxi, Kunshan =

Town in Jiangsu, China

Coordinates: 31°10′58″N 120°53′53″E

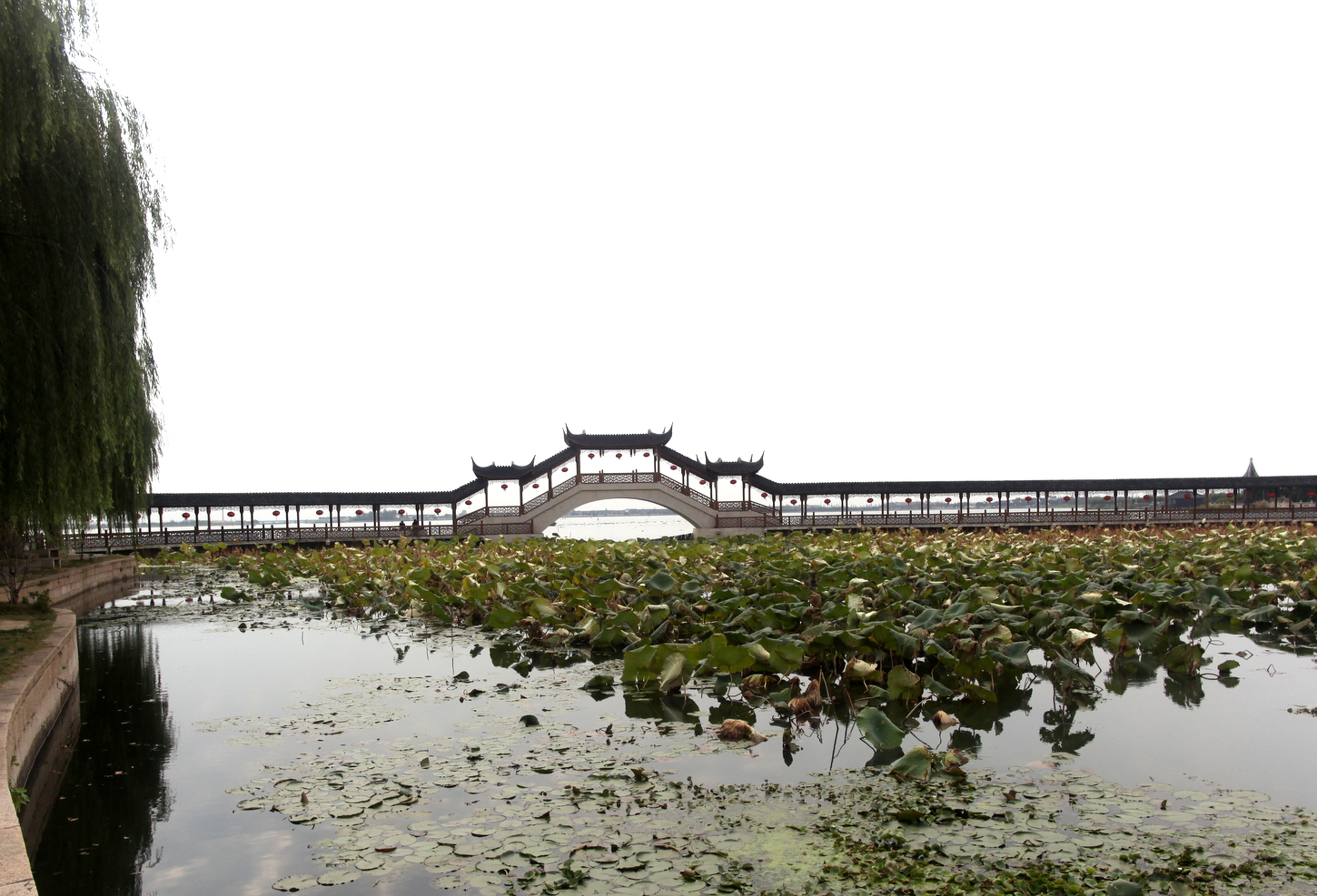
A bridge in Jinxi

Jinxi (Chinese: 锦溪) is a historic canal town in southwest Kunshan, Jiangsu Province, China. It lies 8 kilometers from the famous ancient town Zhouzhuang. It is surrounded by lakes – Dianshan Lake to its east, Cheng Lake to its west, Wubao Lake to its south and Fanqing Lake, Bailian Lake to its north.

== History ==
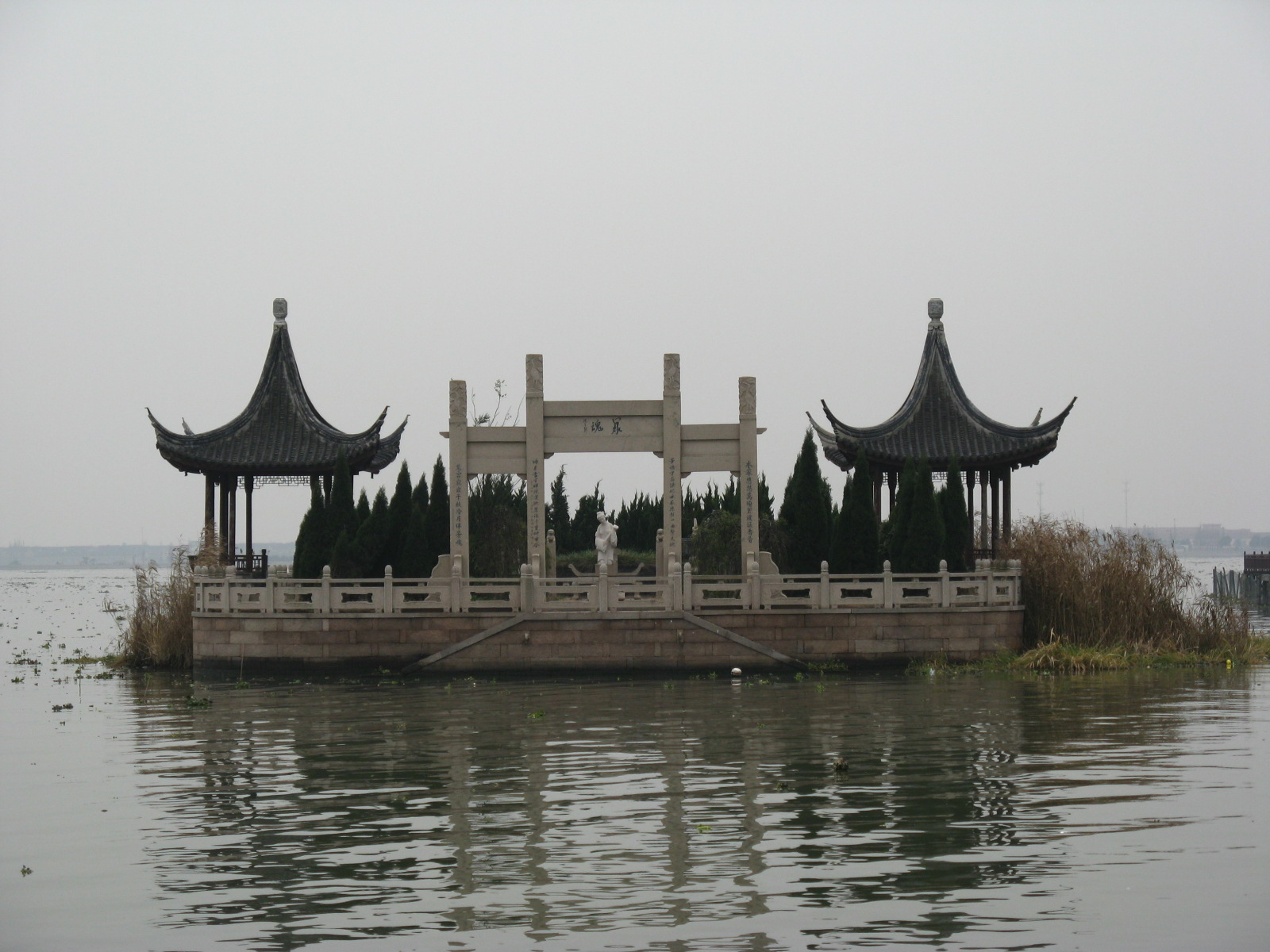
Consort Chen's tomb

Early in the Neolithic Age, this place was inhabited by humans, who created the brilliant prehistoric culture. In Spring and Autumn period, King Helü of Wu ordered Wu Zixu to build a city outside Suzhou, which was the prototype of Jinxi. Ma Yuan, a famous general in the Han dynasty once organized and trained his soldiers here; Zhang Zhao, a famous minister serving Lord Sun Quan in the Three Kingdoms period was buried here. The famous painter Gu Kaizhi in the Eastern Jin dynasty, refused to assume any official positions in his old age and lived in seclusion there. During the Song dynasty, Emperor Xiaozong's consort Lady Chen was infatuated with this town's scenery and chose to be buried here. The town's name was changed to Chenmu (Chen's tomb). This name was carried on for about 880 years and the name Jinxi was not restored until 1993. An old poem described the beautiful scene that “the golden waves of Dianshan Lake reached far while the jade- like tides in Cheng Lake went even”. Therefore, Jinxi is famous for its “golden waves and jade-like tides”.

=== Lake ===
The water-surrounded Jinxi Town is a notable place of interest. Water transportation has been deemed essential in Jinxi, with one source stating: “Boat is needed for the trip between two places even several meters away." Water lanes, river piers, arch bridges, corridors and streets fully present the features of this water town. The town has been described positively by notable Chinese figures. Famous writer Shen Congwen compared this town to “a maiden falling asleep”. Poet Feng Yingzi thought that “both brilliant or simple decorations match this town”, while famous painter Liu Haisu said that it was "the most beautiful town in Jiangnan."

Wubao Lake is at the entrance to the downtown area. The old lotus bridge across the lake is a long corridor with tile roofs and raked eaves, arched to allow boats to pass below. On the near-town side of the bridge are lotuses. That is how the bridge got its name.

The bridge links to the Lianchi Temple at one end.

On the far side of the bridge lies the tomb of Concubine Chen, from the Southern Song dynasty (1127–1279). It is built on a small piece of land in the center of the Wubao Lake, with trees encircling the cemetery and keeping company with the deceased.

Flowing past the entrance, the water extends into a system of canals that thread the town together. It seems no different from other water towns. The only distinction may be that, in Jinxi, the locals outnumber the outsiders, not the other way around. On the streets, locals dry vegetables and noodles under the sun, and the elderly sun-bathe at the foot of wall.

The old Shangtang Street is built along a canal. Shops and eateries are open to the waterside promenade, which has wooden roofs and pillars. Long benches with backrests are fixed at the edge of the gallery though covered by the eaves. Chairs and small tables are put close to the benches for groups of people to sit together.

Among many old name plaques on the old street are a number of privately owned museums that display clay figures, ancient furniture, Yixing clay teapots, traditional bricks and tiles and more.

=== Bridges ===
Jinxi is famous for its “thirty-six bridges and seventy-two brick kilns”. There are thirty-six ancient bridges in this town, with the density of bridges much higher than Suzhou. Most of these bridges were built in the Ming and Qing dynasties and they remain complete despite hundreds of years’ erosion. The steles, columns, piers, and carvings on the bridges are still visible to visitors. These bridges varying in shape, color, age and style not only are the precious historical and cultural heritages of this ancient town, but also make this place “the town of bridges”.

Among the 36 bridges, eight enjoy the largest fame, which are respectively Tianshui Bridge (Heaven Water Bridge), Taiping Bridge (Peace Bridge), Shiyan Bridge (Ten-eye Bridge), Shuang Bridge (Double Bridge), Zhong’an Bridge, Puji Bridge (Broad Aid Bridge), Puqing Bridge (Universal Celebration Bridge), and Lihe Bridge (Internal Peace Bridge). Among them, Tianshui Bridge is commonly called Northern Bodhisattva Bridge. It was initially built in the 5th Year of the Yongle reign of the Ming dynasty.

The city's most famous bridge is the Ten-eye Bridge, built in the Ming dynasty. It is part of the Gulian (古莲 'old lotus') scenic area, a landscape containing the Gulian Pool, Wenxing Pavilion, Long-dam Twisted Corridor and Peach Garden. The bridge is 52 meters long, and is supported by nine piers, forming ten arches, or "eyes" which give it its name. The bridge has a classic and unique shape for Jinxi Town and surrounding areas, giving it another local name, the “Precious Belt Bridge”.
