= Statue of Fan Zhongyan =

Statue in Suzhou, Jiangsu, China

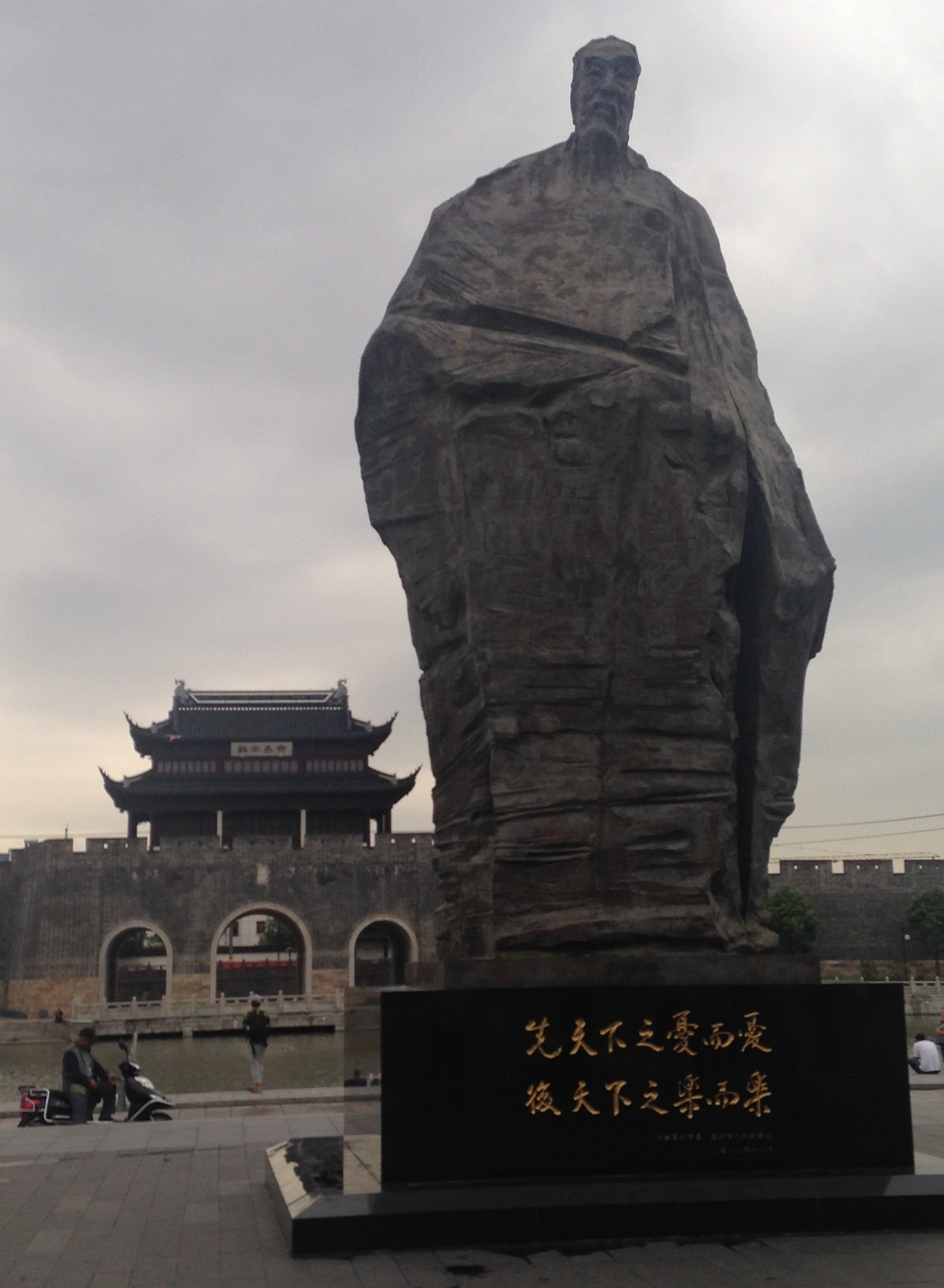
- The statue in 2015
- Subject: Fan Zhongyan
- Location: Suzhou, Jiangsu, China

A statue of Fan Zhongyan is installed outside the Suzhou railway station in Suzhou, Jiangsu, China.
