= Yangchenghu railway station =

Railway station in Kunshan, China

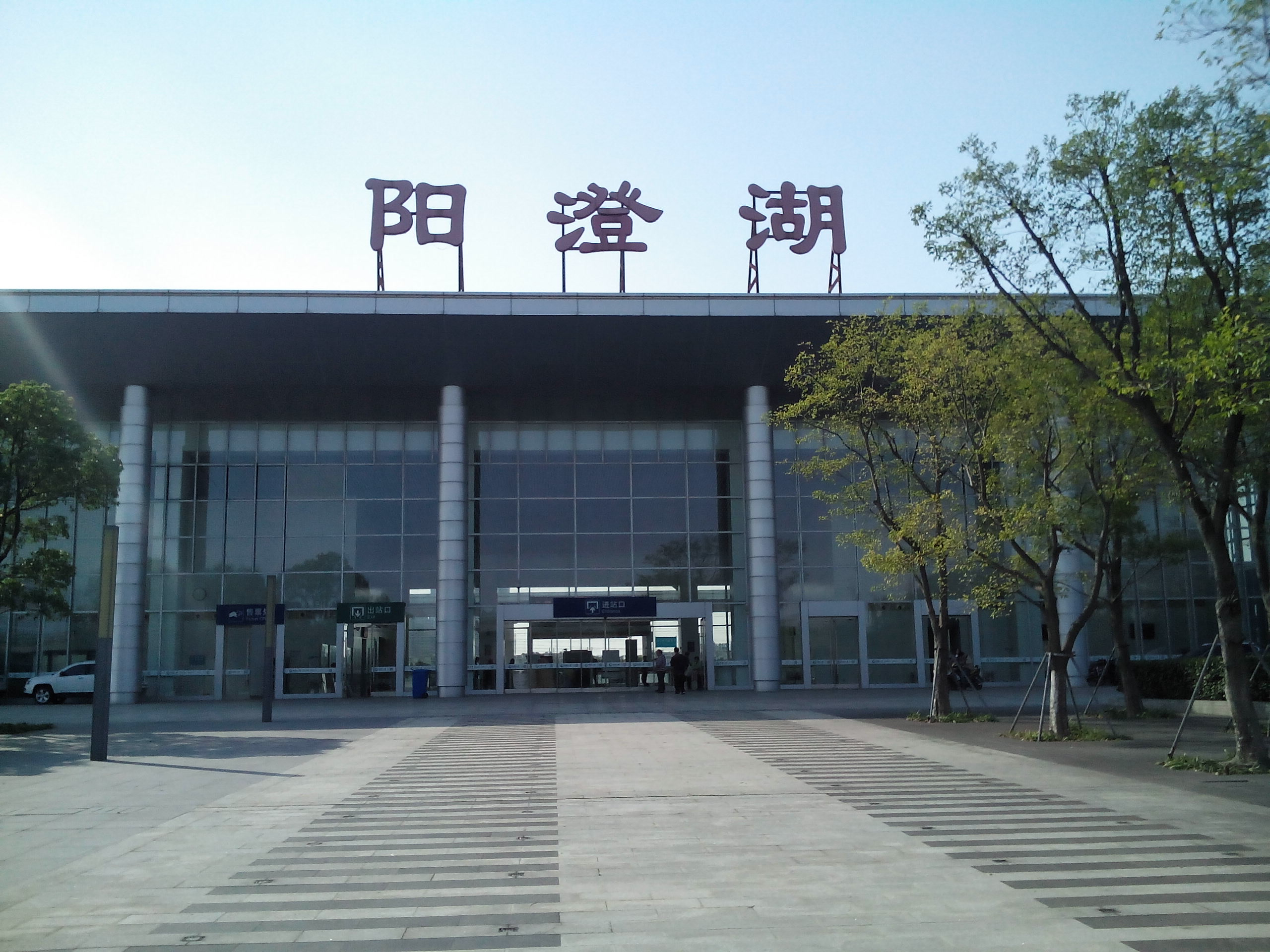
Facade of Yangchenghu Railway Station

Yangchenghu railway station (Chinese: 阳澄湖站; pinyin: Yángchénghú zhàn; lit. 'Yangcheng Lake railway station') is a railway station of Shanghai-Nanjing Intercity Railway. It is located on the west side of Kunshan, Suzhou, Jiangsu Province, China.

The Shanghai–Nanjing intercity railway passes adjacent to the station, but does not stop. The next station to the east, Kunshan South, serves both lines.

The railway station is served by Zhengyi Station on the Line 11 of the Suzhou Metro.

Preceding station	China Railway High-speed	Following station
Kunshan South towards Shanghai or Shanghai Hongqiao	Shanghai–Nanjing intercity railway Part of the Huhanrong Passenger Dedicated Line	Suzhou Industrial Park towards Nanjing
