= Yangcheng Lake =

Lake in Jiangsu Province, China

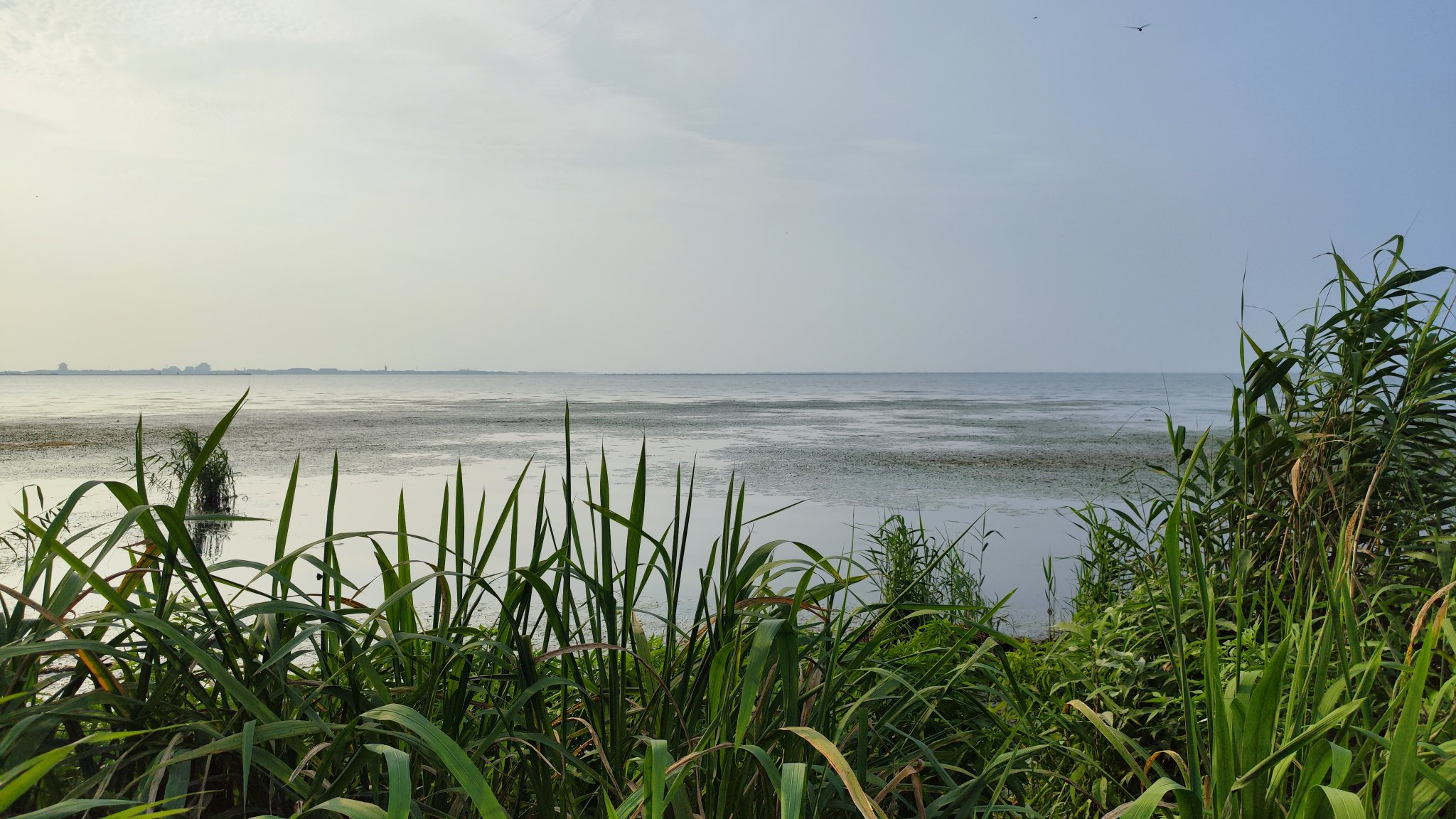
- Yangcheng Lake, viewed from Kunshan

- Location within Jiangsu

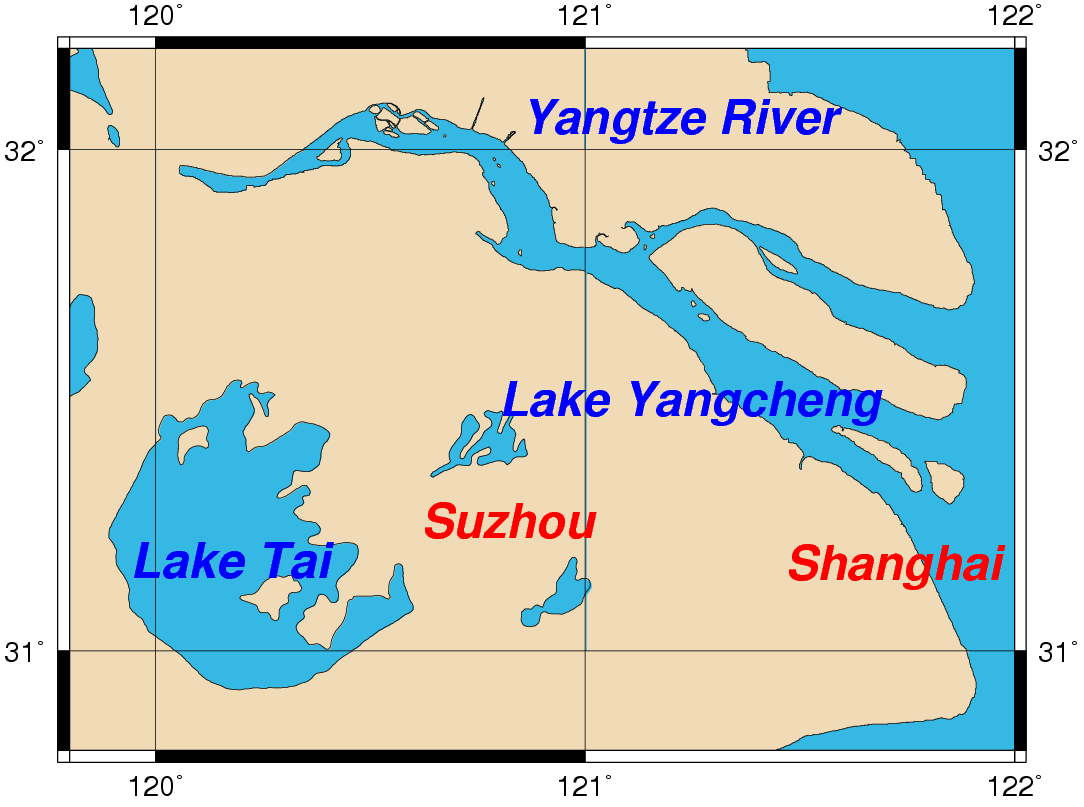
- Location of Yangcheng Lake
- Location: Suzhou, Jiangsu
- Coordinates: 31°25′51″N 120°48′47″E
- Basin countries: China
- Max. length: 17 km (11 mi)
- Max. width: 8 km (5.0 mi)
- Average depth: 1.5–2 m (4 ft 11 in – 6 ft 7 in)
- Max. depth: 2 m (6 ft 7 in)

Yangcheng Lake (Chinese: 阳澄湖; pinyin: Yángchéng Hú) is a freshwater lake in Suzhou, Jiangsu province, China, about 3 km (1.9 mi) northeast of the city center. The lake is 17 km (11 mi) long from north to south, with an average width of 8 km (5.0 mi) from east to west, a surface area of about 20 km^{2} (7.7 sq mi), and ranges in depth from 1.5–2 m (4 ft 11 in – 6 ft 7 in).

Yangcheng lake is located between Lake Tai and the Yangtze River. It crosses the boundary between the Suzhou and the county-level cities of Changshu and Kunshan. The 2,310 m (1.44 mi)-long Yangcheng West Lake Tunnel (阳澄西湖隧道) runs underneath the lake, and the lake itself is served by both a mainline high-speed railway station Yangchenghu railway station and 2 stations of the Suzhou Metro system: Yangchenghu South station on Line 5 and Yangchenghu East on Line 11.

The lake is the most famous native habitat for the Chinese mitten crab, which is considered a regional delicacy. The crabs migrate from Yangcheng Lake towards the Yangtze delta for mating in September and October, and the local fishermen harvest the animals during this migration. In 2002, the total production of Chinese mitten crabs in Yangcheng Lake was estimated to be about 1,500 t (3,300,000 lb).
