= Kunshan =

County-level city in Jiangsu, China

Kunshan 昆山市
- County-level & Sub-prefectural city
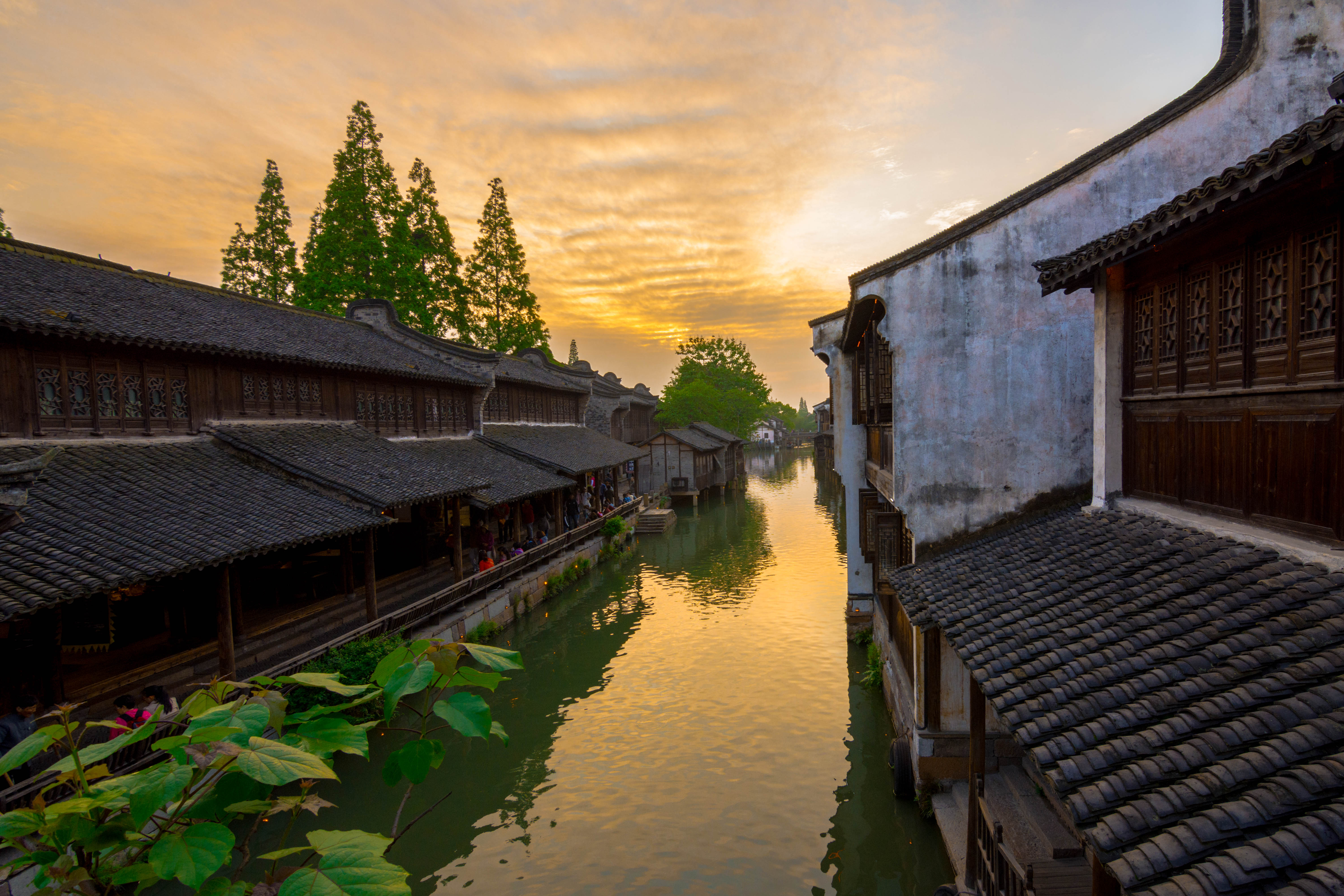
- Zhouzhuang, Kunshan

- Location in Jiangsu Kunshan (Jiangsu)
- Coordinates: 31°19′19″N 120°59′06″E
- Country: China
- Province: Jiangsu
- Prefecture-level city: Suzhou

Government
  - Party Secretary: Yao Linrong (姚林荣)
  - Mayor: Du Xiaogang (杜小刚)

Area
  - County-level & Sub-prefectural city: 927.68 km^{2} (358.18 sq mi)

Population (2020)
  - County-level & Sub-prefectural city: 2,092,496
  - Density: 2,255.6/km^{2} (5,842.0/sq mi)
  - Urban: 1,652,159
  - Rural: 440,337
- Time zone: UTC+8 (China Standard)
- Postal code: 215300
- Area code: 0512
- Vehicle registration plates: 苏EM, 苏EP, 苏EN, 苏EX
- Website: www.ks.gov.cn (in Chinese)

Kunshan

Kunshan
- Traditional Chinese: 崑山
- Simplified Chinese: 昆山
Transcriptions
Standard Mandarin
- Hanyu Pinyin: Kūnshān
- Bopomofo: ㄎㄨㄣ ㄕㄢ
- Gwoyeu Romatzyh: Kuenshan
- Wade–Giles: K‘un-shan
- Tongyong Pinyin: Kunshan
- Yale Romanization: Kwenshan
- MPS2: Kuēnshān
- IPA: kʰu̯ən⁵⁵ ʂa̠n⁵⁵
Wu
- Romanization: Khuonsae
Yue: Cantonese
- Yale Romanization: Kwānsāan
- Jyutping: Kwan1 saan1
Southern Min
- Hokkien POJ: Khun-san
- Tâi-lô: Khun-san

Kunshan is a county-level city in southeastern Jiangsu province with Shanghai bordering its eastern border. It is under the administration of the prefecture-level city of Suzhou.

== History ==
=== Imperial Era ===
During the Han Dynasty, Lou (婁) County was established, named after the Lou River (present-day Liu River: 瀏河) which flowed from west to east through the region. It was briefly renamed Louzhi (婁治) during the Xin Dynasty under Wang Mang. In 220 AD, Zhang Zhao of Eastern Wu, was enfeoffed as the Marquess of Lou, making the county a marquessate. Following several administrative transitions, it was renamed Xinyi (信義) in the 5th century, with the administrative seat eventually relocating near Mount Kun (Kunshan).

During the Wu-Yue period, polder fields were actively expanded in low-lying areas. However, from the late 10th to the mid-11th century, hydraulic management deteriorated; the area remained sparsely populated with unrestricted land occupation, while the peripheral marshlands served as hideouts for fugitives and salt smugglers.

By the late 11th century, extensive land reclamation led by local magnates—particularly around Dianshan Lake—began to obstruct irrigation and drainage systems. The weakening flow of the Wusong River further impeded flood discharge—an environmental crisis that persisted until the mid-12th century.

In 1217, the eastern higher-lying areas of Kunshan County, being geographically remote and marked by tax evasion, were partitioned to form Jiading county. The region's strategic importance grew during the Yuan dynasty with the rise of maritime grain transport.

In 1296, Kunshan was elevated to a subprefecture, and in 1315 its administrative seat was relocated to present-day Taicang, until Zhang Shicheng seized control of the region. The era was marked by the emergence of notably wealthy individuals, including Shen Wansan. Concurrently, a vibrant cultural scene developed, supported by patrons such as Gu Ying, whose "Yushan Grass Hall" became an important gathering place for artists like Ni Zan.

Following the establishment of the Taicang Guard in 1367, Taicang Subprefecture was formally created in 1497 from the elevated portions of Kunshan, Changshu, and Jiading.

In the 16th century, Wei Liangfu reformed the local Southern songs into the more sophisticated Kunshan melody, favored by the literati. Kunshan native Liang Chenyu subsequently authored Washing Silk (Huan Sha Ji), the first play composed specifically for this melody. Known as Kunqu, the genre became the dominant form of elite theatre in China proper until the mid-19th century Taiping Rebellion.

In 1645, Kunshan suffered a massacre by Qing forces, resulting in tens of thousands of deaths. Notable local Ming loyalists include Gu Yanwu and Zhu Yongchun, both of whom remained active until the late 17th century.

Xu Qianxue established a large private library: Chuanshi lou (Pavilion for the Transmission of the Truth) in the county. In 1724, due to its dense population, Kunshan was split into two counties: Kunshan and Xinyang (新陽) to share a same walled city. By the mid-Qing period, market towns such as Siqiao, Shipu, Qiuxu, and Penglang rose to prominence.

=== Modern Period ===
Following Humphrey Marshall's 1853 meeting in Kunshan, his successor Robert M. McLane also met with Governor-General Yiliang there in 1854, formally requesting the opening of the Yangtze River.

In 1860, the Taiping Army captured Kunshan. In 1863, Charles George Gordon moved the headquarters of the Ever Victorious Army from Songjiang to Kunshan. The rebellion caused significant destruction and population loss in both counties.

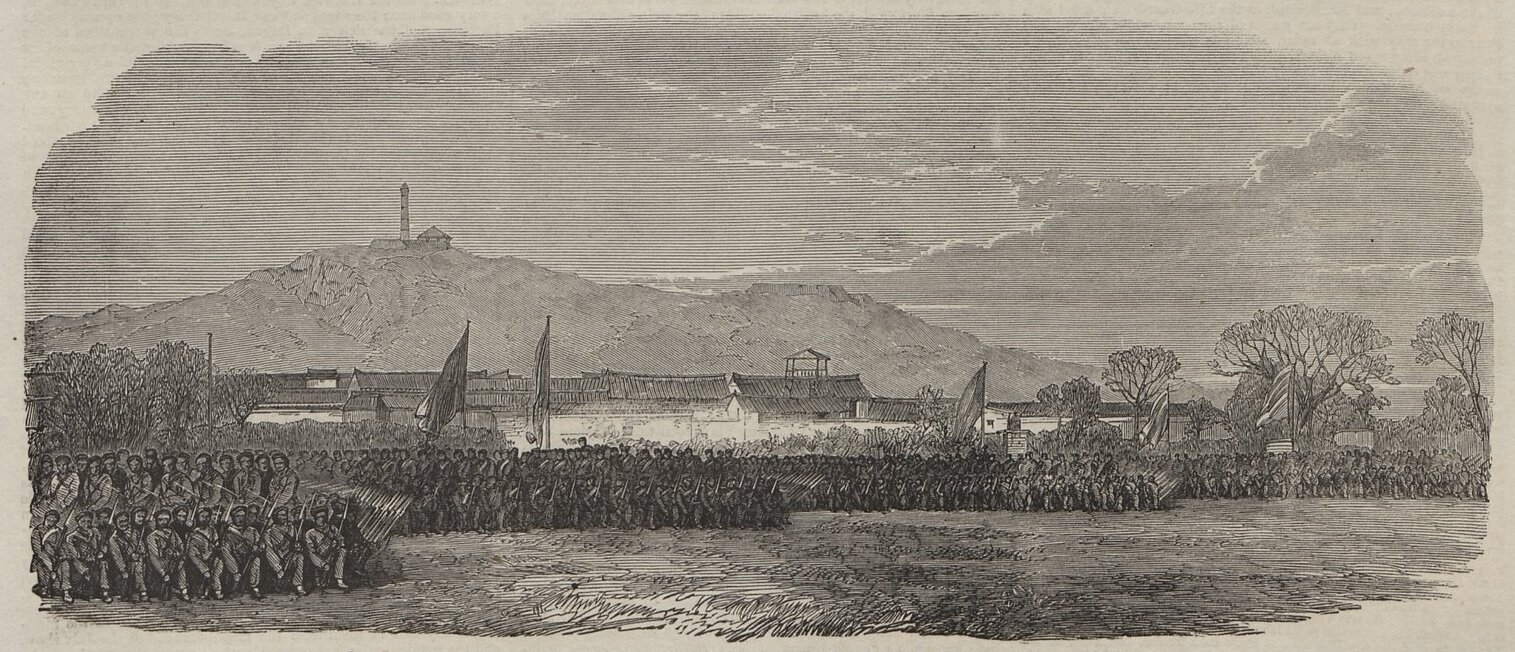
Troops of the Quinsan (Kunshan) Garrison, under Major Gordon from The Illustrated London News, 1864.

The post-rebellion destruction of hydraulic systems forced a shift from rice to reed farming. By the 1920s, reeds occupied 10% of Kunshan's farmland, while rice dropped to 25%. This environmental change fostered habitats for snail intermediate hosts, making schistosomiasis highly prevalent in the area.

In 1912, Xinyang County was merged back into Kunshan. During 1911-2, 130 local villages formed an alliance to protest rents. A 1920s survey indicated intensifying social polarization as landownership became more concentrated. The proportion of landless tenant farmers rose from 57% in 1905 to 77% by 1924, with 66.4% of them indebted to their landlords. Additionally, 65.9% of landlords were absentees residing in cities like Suzhou and Shanghai.

In 1926, National Association of Vocational Education of China selected Xugongqiao of Kunshan as an experimental zone for rural reconstruction. Despite its intellectual legacy, Liang Shuming criticized the experiment for its over-reliance on gentry elites and failing to mobilize the broader peasantry, leading to a very low actual participation rate.

The integration of Kunshan into the Shanghai metropolitan area began to emerge in the early 20th century. Following the opening of the Shanghai-Nanjing Railway and the establishment of Kunshan Station, the Zikawei Observatory was forced to relocate its terrestrial magnetism station to Lujiabang (Lukiapang) in southeastern Kunshan, due to electromagnetic interference from Shanghai's trams. This regional connectivity was further strengthened in 1935 with the construction of the Shanghai-Suzhou cinder road passing through the county.

During the Second Sino-Japanese War, the Nanking-Shanghai Garrison Command relocated to Kunshan on August 23, 1937. On November 15, Japanese forces occupied the city, maintaining control until August 1945. In 1948, the local government implemented rent reductions to curb Communist expansion. On May 13, 1949, the People's Liberation Army entered the county seat.

=== Contemporary Development ===
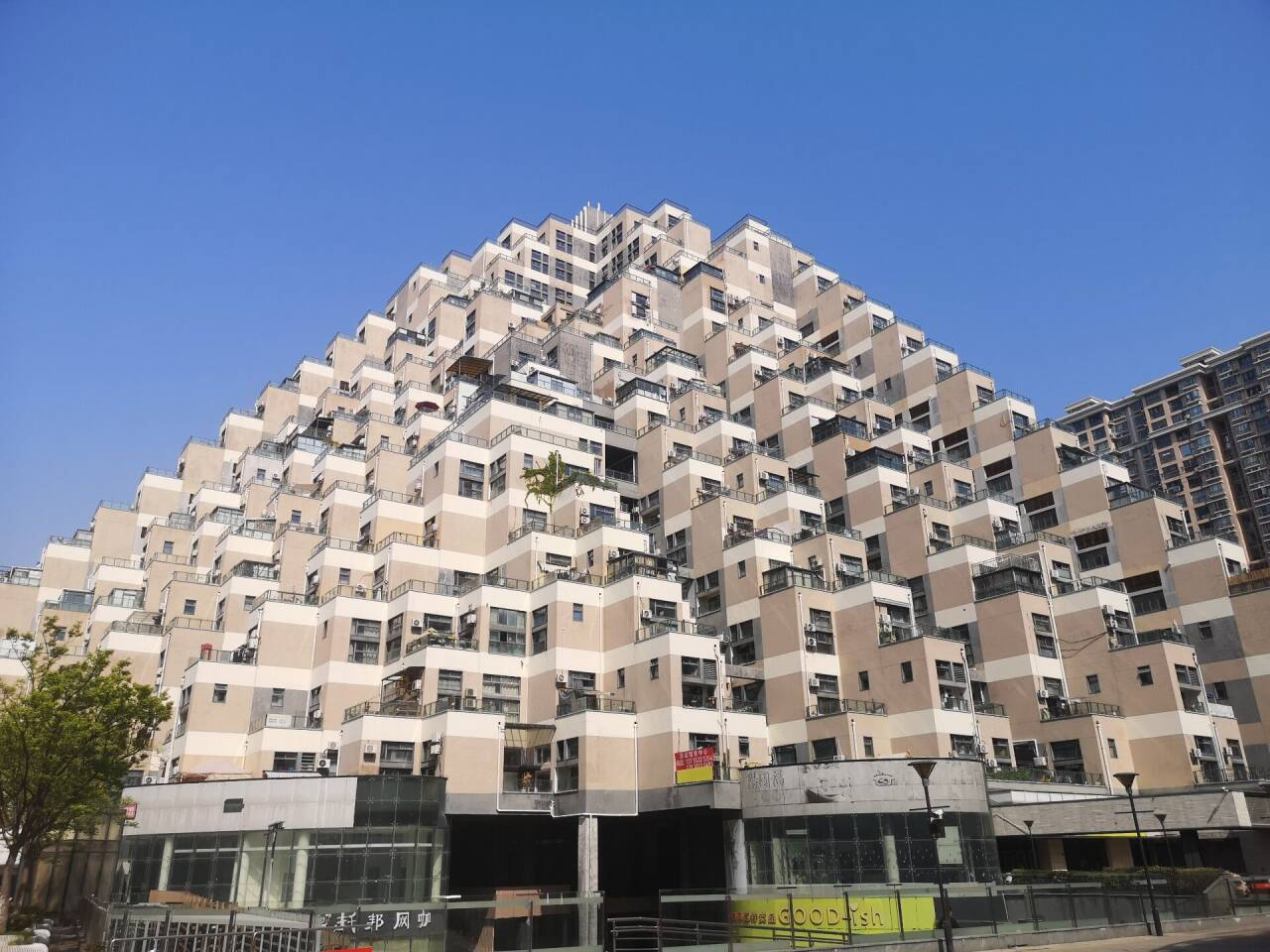
The "Youzhan" pyramid-shaped apartment complex in Huaqiao

Historically, Kunshan was among the areas most severely affected by schistosomiasis in China. The county's first comprehensive census in 1970 recorded an infection rate of 47.5%. Reed-clearing campaigns in the 1950s met local opposition due to dependence on the crop. After large-scale medical treatment and intensive "snail eradication" campaigns in the early 1970s, the infection rate fell to 3% by 1977, and new local infections were declared eliminated in 1986.

In the late 20th century, Kunshan pivoted toward an export-oriented economy by establishing a development zone through self-raised funds. In September 1989, Kunshan was officially upgraded from a county to a county-level city. Town and village-level industries, once the most important enterprises in Kunshan comprised 69.8 percent of the 2,205 industrial enterprises and 58.5 percent of the gross value of industrial output in 1996.

Prior to China mainland's accession to the WTO in 2001, over 900 Taiwanese enterprises had settled in the city, with contracted investment exceeding $5.4 billion USD, representing approximately one-tenth of the total contracted Taiwanese investment in mainland China at the time.

Since the beginning of the 21st century, Kunshan has been granted exceptional administrative powers for its economy. In 2012, Kunshan was selected to pilot the reform that places counties directly under Jiangsu provincial administration.

== Administration ==
Kunshan is divided into several towns and development areas:

- Yushan (玉山, the seat of city nominally)
- Bacheng (巴城)
- Dianshanhu (淀山湖)
- Huaqiao (花桥)
- Jinxi (锦溪)
- Lujia (陆家)
- Qiandeng (千灯)
- Penglang (蓬朗)
- Zhangpu (张浦)
- Zhoushi (周市)
- Zhouzhuang (周庄)

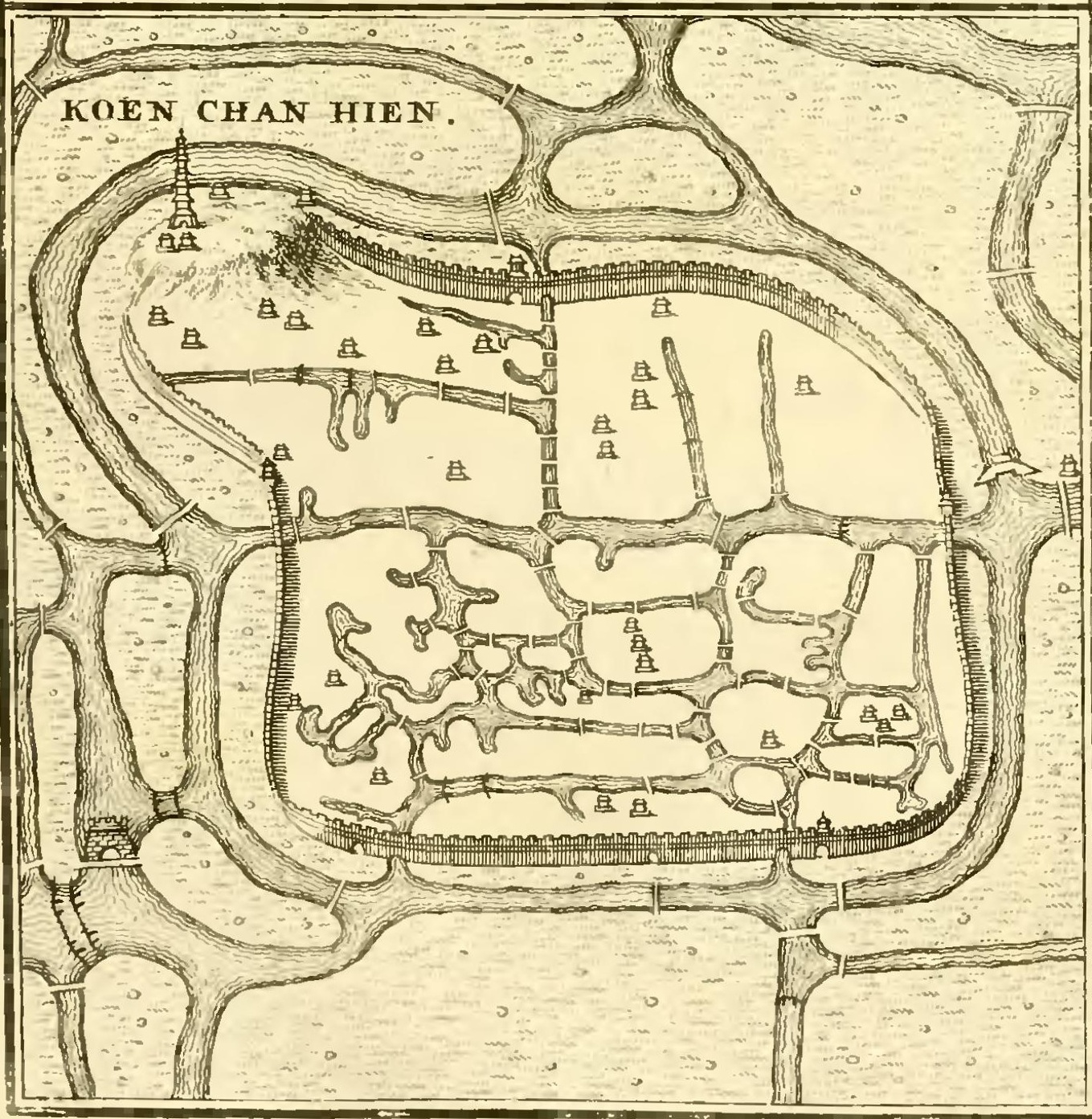
Map of Koen-chan-hien (Kunshan county) from Du Halde's 1735 Description de la Chine, based on reports by Jesuit missionaries

Kunshan New & Hi-tech Industrial Development Zone (昆山高新技术产业开发区, KSND) administering the main part of Yushan functions as the seat of the city, while Huaqiao Economic Development Zone (花桥经济开发区) administers the north of Huaqiao and Kunshan Economic & Technological Development Zone (昆山经济技术开发区, KETD) administers the east of Yushan.

On July 10, 2018, the Jiangsu Provincial Government approved the Master Plan of Kunshan for Urban Development (2017-2035), which is based on the master plan of the Xiong'an New Area. These zones include the Qingyang Port Waterfront City Center, the Duke Creative Park, the Kunshan South Gateway, the Chaoyang Road CBD and the Tinglin Park Traditional Culture Zone—in addition to the Line 11 Rail Line Corridor.

Qingyang Port Waterfront City Center

Covering an area of 3.4 km^{2}, the area is located in Kunshan's city center. Planned as an ecological, cultural and smart area, it will include six zones—a media port, a cultural oasis, an urban lifestyle community, a waterfront park, a futuristic life experience center, and a youth entrepreneurship park. The area is designed to be a waterfront space that will enrich and diversify citizens' urban life as the most environmentally attractive and economically prosperous hub in the city.

Duke Creative Park

The park is located west of the city's technology innovation cluster, covering an area of 3.84 km^{2}. It sits nearby three lakes, two industrial parks, and a town. With the support of Duke Kunshan University, the area will host the Sino-US (Kunshan) Technology Innovation Center and serve as a mixed-used project integrating R&D centers, business services, and an ecological park. It aims to become a global magnet for technology entrepreneurs and innovators.

Kunshan South Gateway

The area is located around the city's high-speed railway station, with an area of 1.6 km^{2}. It serves as a transportation hub integrating high-speed trains, rail transportation, and public buses, and is planned to include businesses such as office spaces for lease, business services and recruitment agencies. The area is intended to become a business cluster in the inter-city economic belt of Shanghai and Nanjing.

Chaoyang Road CBD

The CBD covers an area of 5.55 km^{2} in the old city center of Kunshan. The area will be furnished with enhanced amenities and infrastructure according to a plan featuring "one ring, two axes, three centers and four zones". The project aims to revive and transform the old city center into an exquisite and livable model business district.

Tinglin Park Traditional Culture Zone

The zone is located at the foot of Yufeng Mountain, with a planned area of 0.73 km^{2}. It is designed with cultural and art parks, culture-oriented businesses and ecological and leisure facilities. It will epitomize the natural beauty and cultural richness of the city.

Suzhou Metro Line 11

Line 11 of the Suzhou Metro is a 41 km long underground line with 28 stops. The line passes by all the major zones of the city and was designed to significantly alleviate local traffic congestion. The project is integrated with the surface transportation system and serves as a strong boost to the city's renewal.

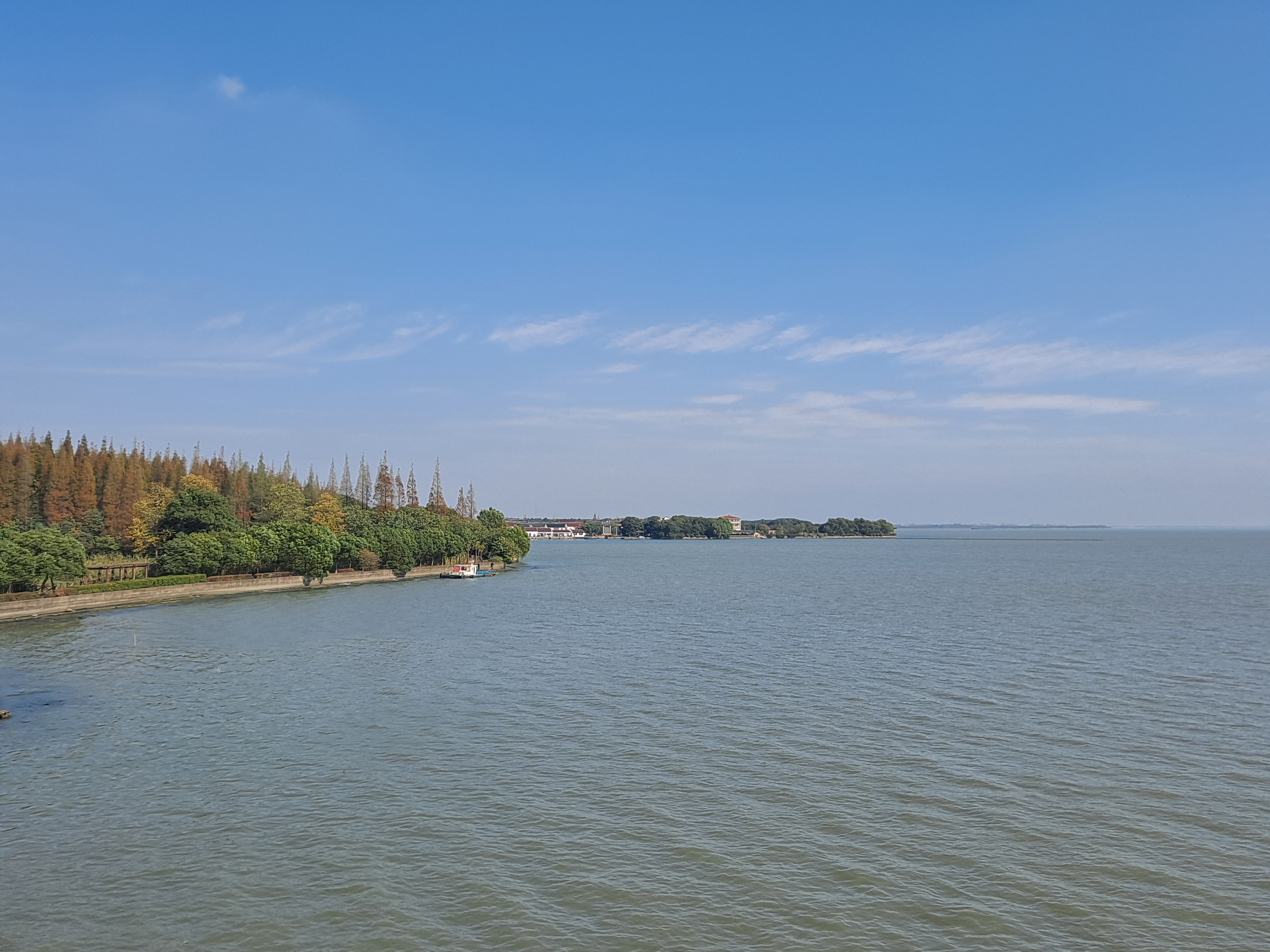
Dianshan Lake

== Geography ==
=== Topography ===
The area is relatively flat, but there is a gentle slope stretching from the south-east to north-west. The northern part consists of dense polder, while the southern part is dotted with various lakes. The major lakes are Dianshan Lake, Yangcheng Lake, Cheng Lake and Kuilei Lake. The Wusong River winds through the city, while smaller rivers criss-cross it in a grid pattern.

=== Climate ===
Climate data for Kunshan, elevation 3 m (9.8 ft), (1991–2020 normals, extremes 1977–present)
Month	Jan	Feb	Mar	Apr	May	Jun	Jul	Aug	Sep	Oct	Nov	Dec	Year
Record high °C (°F)	21.7 (71.1)	26.4 (79.5)	33.1 (91.6)	33.3 (91.9)	35.6 (96.1)	37.1 (98.8)	38.6 (101.5)	40.6 (105.1)	37.6 (99.7)	32.5 (90.5)	27.7 (81.9)	22.5 (72.5)	40.6 (105.1)
Mean daily maximum °C (°F)	8.0 (46.4)	10.3 (50.5)	14.6 (58.3)	20.6 (69.1)	25.8 (78.4)	28.5 (83.3)	32.7 (90.9)	32.2 (90.0)	28.2 (82.8)	23.2 (73.8)	17.4 (63.3)	10.8 (51.4)	21.0 (69.8)
Daily mean °C (°F)	4.3 (39.7)	6.1 (43.0)	10.2 (50.4)	15.8 (60.4)	21.1 (70.0)	24.6 (76.3)	28.8 (83.8)	28.4 (83.1)	24.3 (75.7)	18.9 (66.0)	13.2 (55.8)	6.8 (44.2)	16.9 (62.4)
Mean daily minimum °C (°F)	1.4 (34.5)	2.9 (37.2)	6.6 (43.9)	11.8 (53.2)	17.2 (63.0)	21.5 (70.7)	25.7 (78.3)	25.5 (77.9)	21.2 (70.2)	15.4 (59.7)	9.7 (49.5)	3.5 (38.3)	13.5 (56.4)
Record low °C (°F)	−11.7 (10.9)	−6.9 (19.6)	−3.7 (25.3)	0.0 (32.0)	6.8 (44.2)	12.3 (54.1)	18.6 (65.5)	16.6 (61.9)	10.5 (50.9)	2.5 (36.5)	−2.7 (27.1)	−7.9 (17.8)	−11.7 (10.9)
Average precipitation mm (inches)	67.5 (2.66)	62.7 (2.47)	86.7 (3.41)	78.4 (3.09)	92.3 (3.63)	198.6 (7.82)	152.1 (5.99)	182.3 (7.18)	101.2 (3.98)	66.5 (2.62)	56.3 (2.22)	45.1 (1.78)	1,189.7 (46.85)
Average precipitation days (≥ 0.1 mm)	10.4	10.0	11.9	10.9	11.0	13.7	11.8	12.4	9.0	7.5	8.5	8.4	125.5
Average snowy days	2.6	1.9	0.6	0	0	0	0	0	0	0	0.1	0.9	6.1
Average relative humidity (%)	76	75	73	72	72	80	79	80	79	76	75	73	76
Mean monthly sunshine hours	116.2	118.1	142.4	165.4	175.7	128.8	193.4	192.5	163.3	163.1	135.6	132.6	1,827.1
Percentage possible sunshine	36	38	38	43	41	30	45	47	44	47	43	42	41
Source: China Meteorological Administration September Record High all-time extreme

According to an analysis of the local meteorological bureau, from 1961 to 2008, the annual and seasonal air temperatures were the increasing trends, especially in spring. The total precipitation remained static relatively, however, much concentrated in summer and winter.

== Economy ==
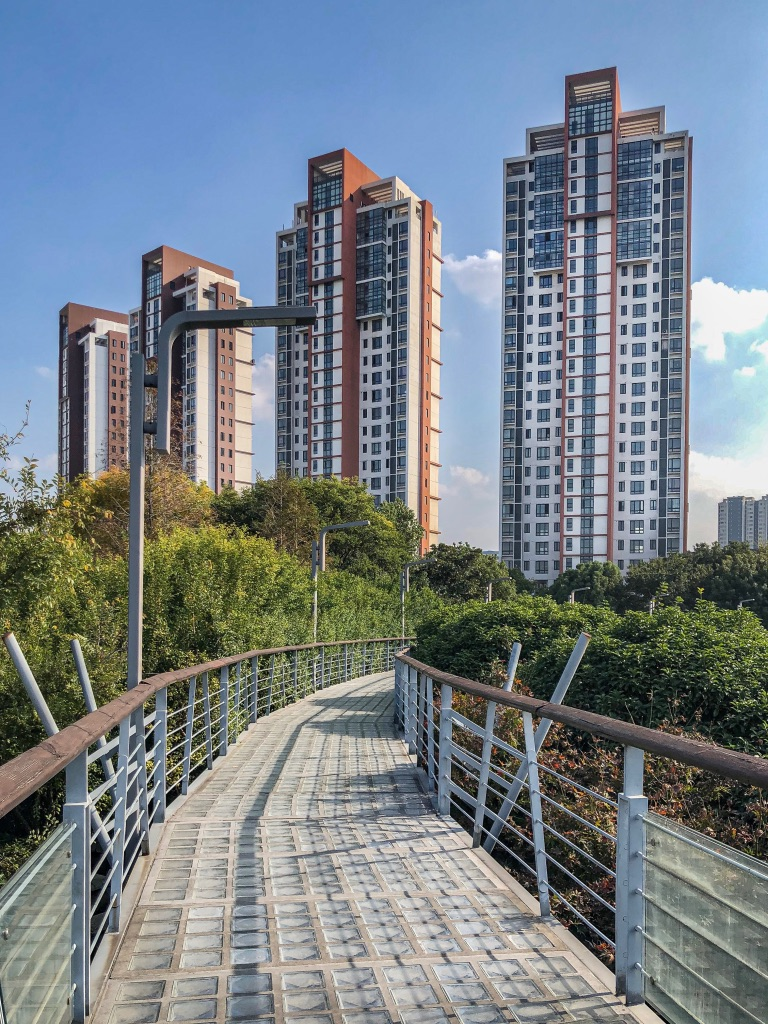
Apartment blocks in Kunshan

The composition of local GDP have changed drastically since 1978. In 1978, the primary sector, the secondary sector and the tertiary sector accounted for 51.4%, 28.9% and 19.7% of Kunshan's GDP, respectively. However, in 2015, the primary sector only accounted for 0.9% of Kunshan's GDP, while the secondary sector accounted for 55.1% and the tertiary sector accounted for 44.0%. Kunshan is also home to over 1,000 hi-tech companies that have helped shape the city's four economic pillars—optoelectronics, semiconductors, intelligent manufacturing, and RNAi and biomedicine.

The total GDP of Kunshan was 316 billion RMB, the highest of any Chinese county-level city in 2016.

Kunshan is also home to many Taiwanese who have invested over the decades since the reform and opening up in the late 70s. Kunshan is also known as "Little Taiwan" because of the large Taiwanese community there. In 2020, there were more than 100,000 Taiwanese people in Kunshan.

The Chinese subsidiary of American Megatrends, American Megatrends Information Technology (Kunshan) Co., Ltd. (安迈信息科技（昆山）有限公司), has its headquarters in Kunshan.

== Culture ==
=== Kunqu Opera ===
Kunshan is the origin of Kunqu, also known as Kunqu opera. Kunqu is one of the oldest extant forms of Chinese opera. It evolved from the local melody of Kunshan, and subsequently came to dominate Chinese theater from the 16th to the 18th centuries. Today, Kunqu is performed in many cities in China.

=== Kunshan Culture & Art Center ===
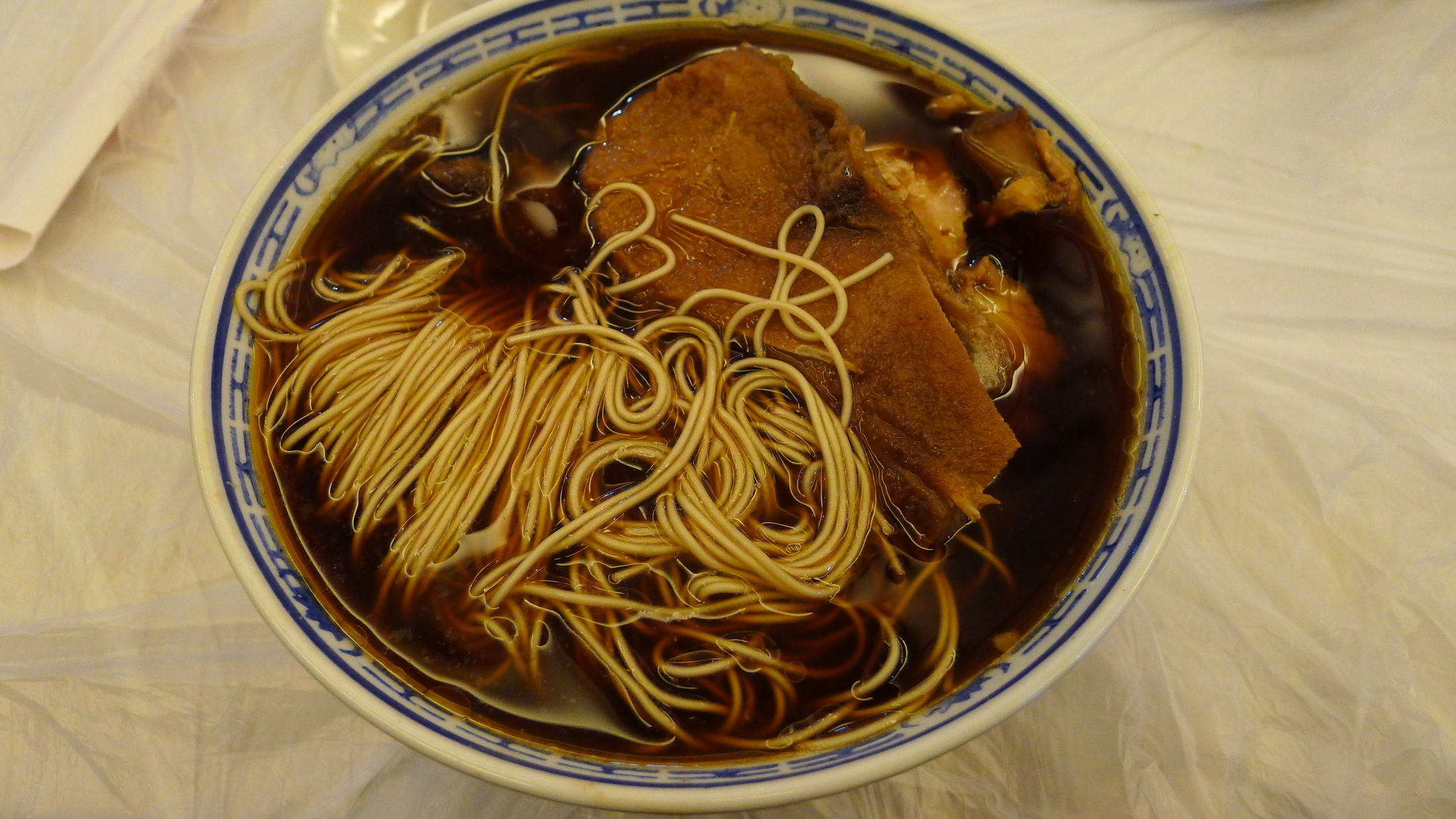
Aozao noodles (奥灶面)

Kunshan Culture & Art Center, situated west of downtown, is usually used as the venue for considerable local performances and conventions. The center is composed of a performing arts center, a convention center, a movie theater. Its first phase of the project is set in about 17.6 acres of land.

=== Cuisine ===
Kunshan is known for its Yangcheng Lake hairy crabs, which are prized for their sweet flesh and fatty roe. Yangcheng Lake, famous for its hairy crabs, is located in Kunshan.

== Recreation and tourism ==
Kunshan is one of the most visited tourist destinations among the Yangtze River Delta with over 20 million visits in 2016.

The 2013 World Cyber Games were held in Kunshan in order to draw in tourism and positive press.

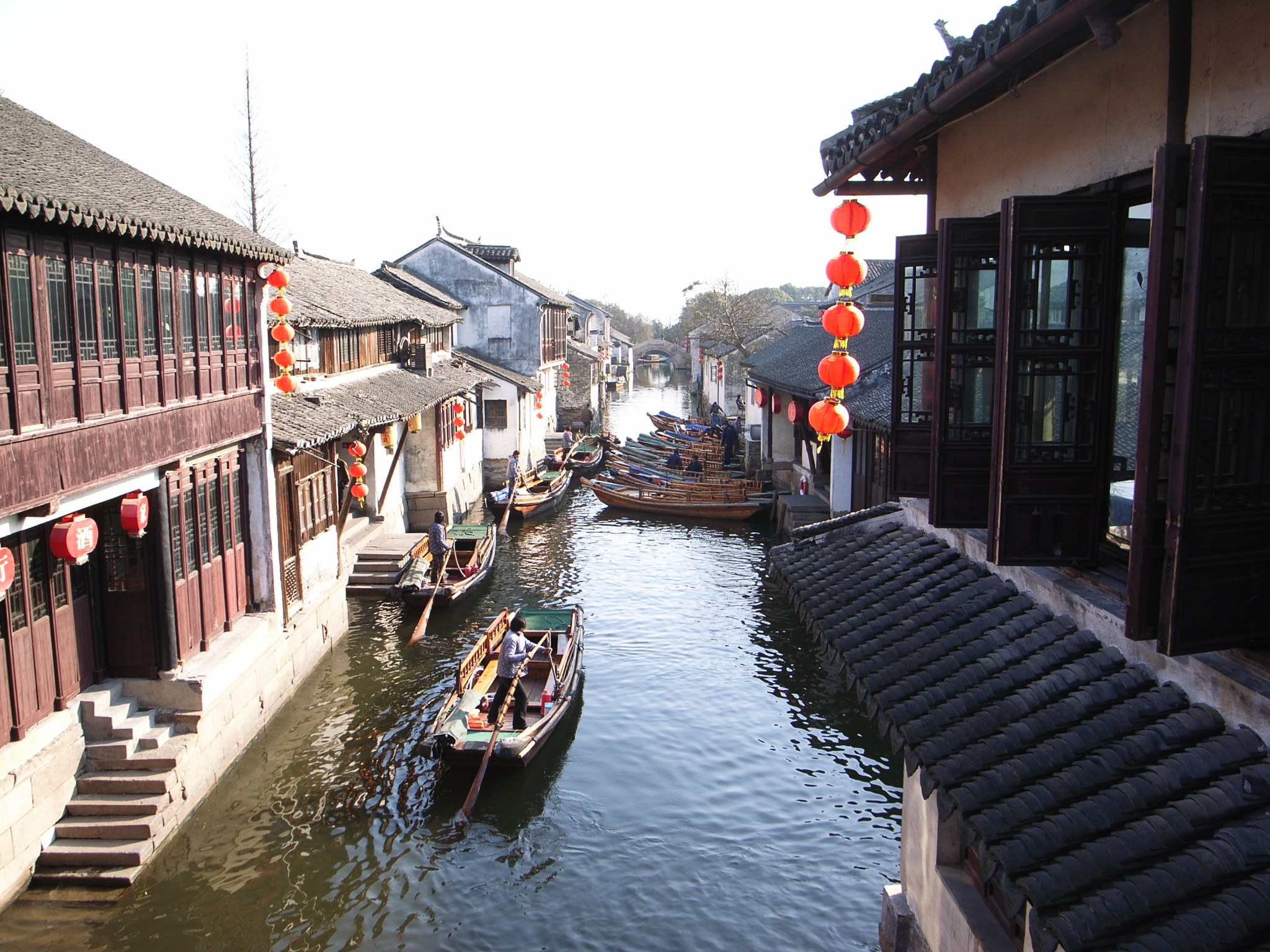
Zhouzhuang Ancient Town

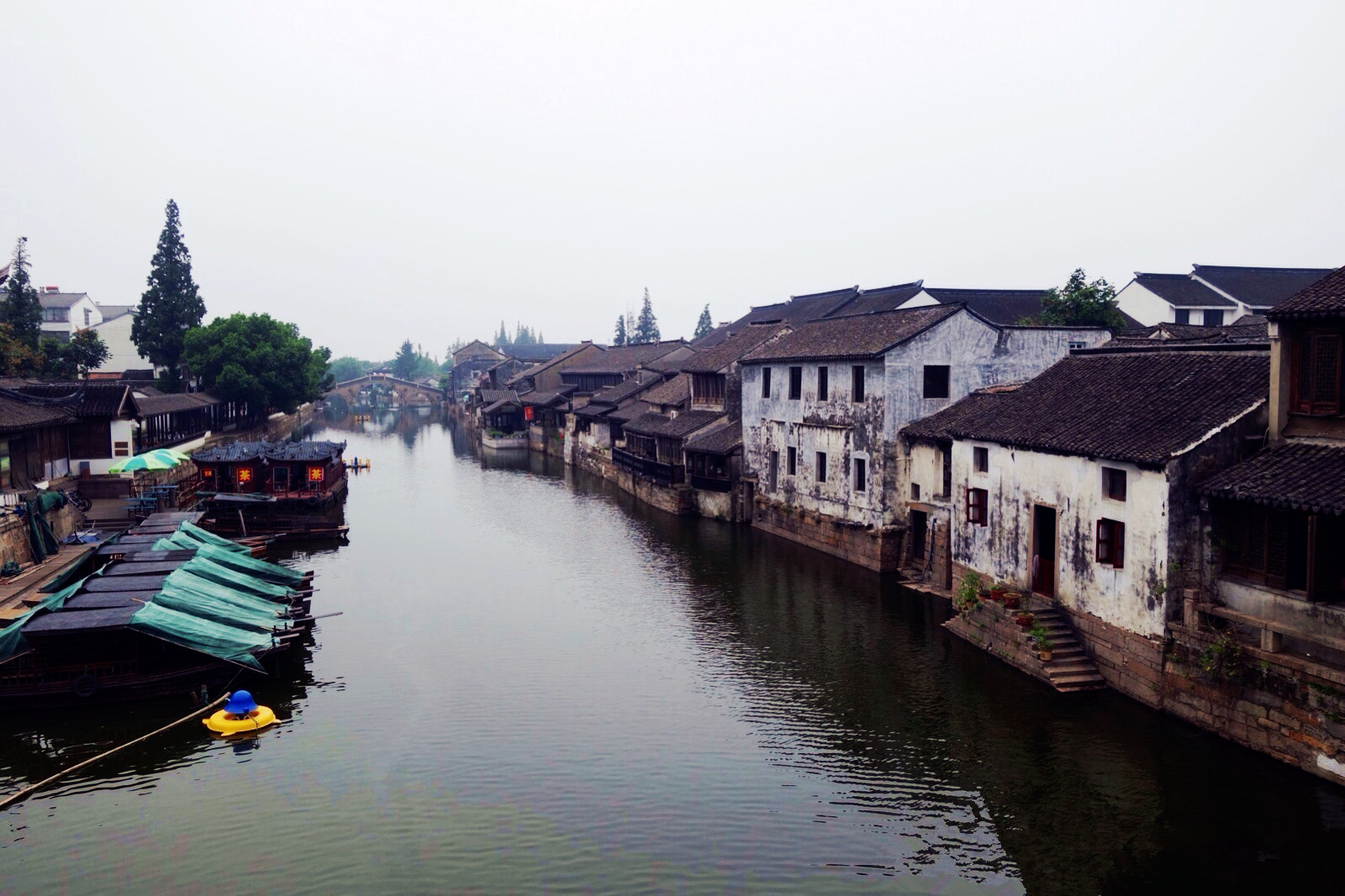
Qiandeng Ancient Town

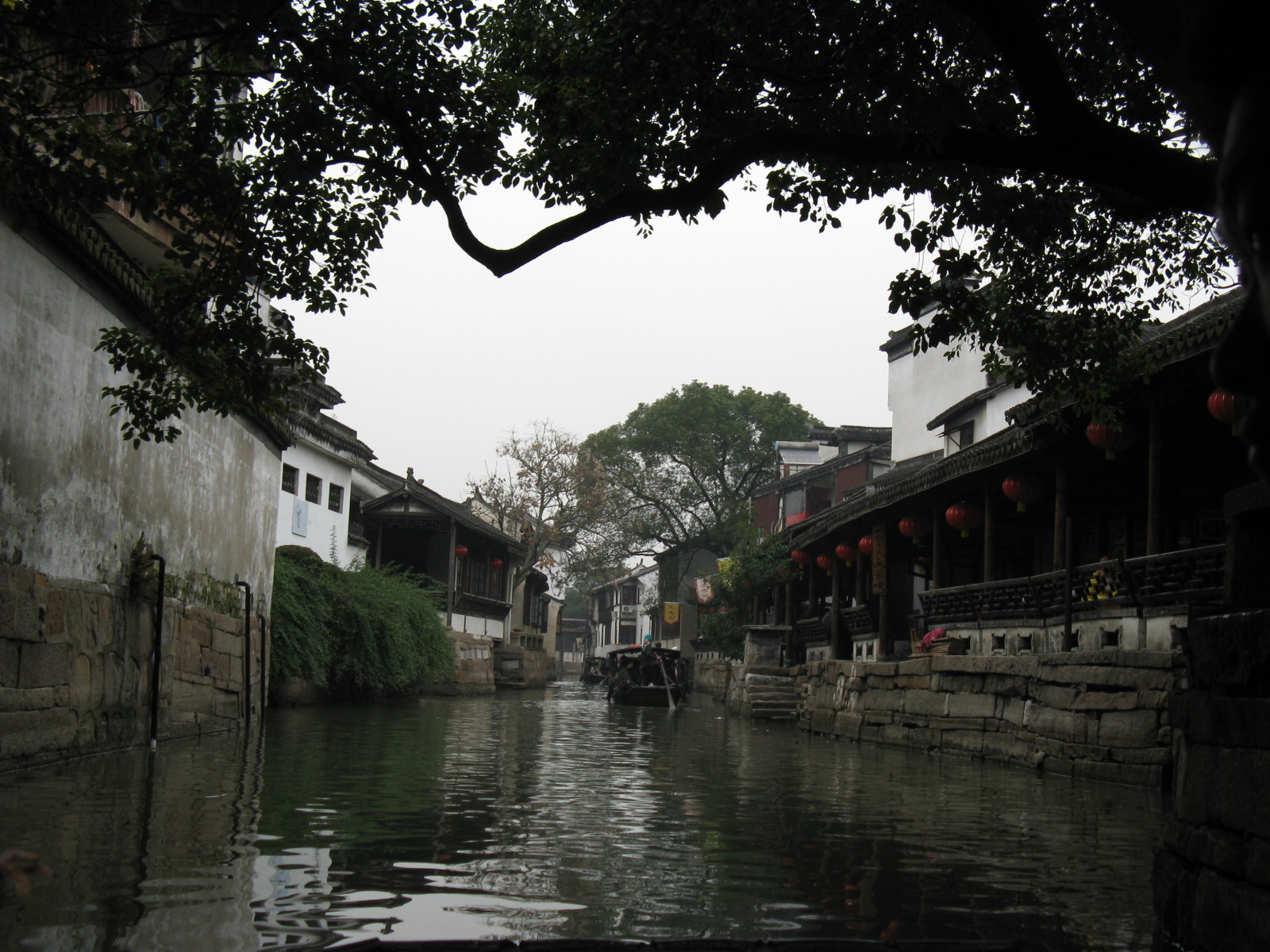
Jinxi Ancient Town

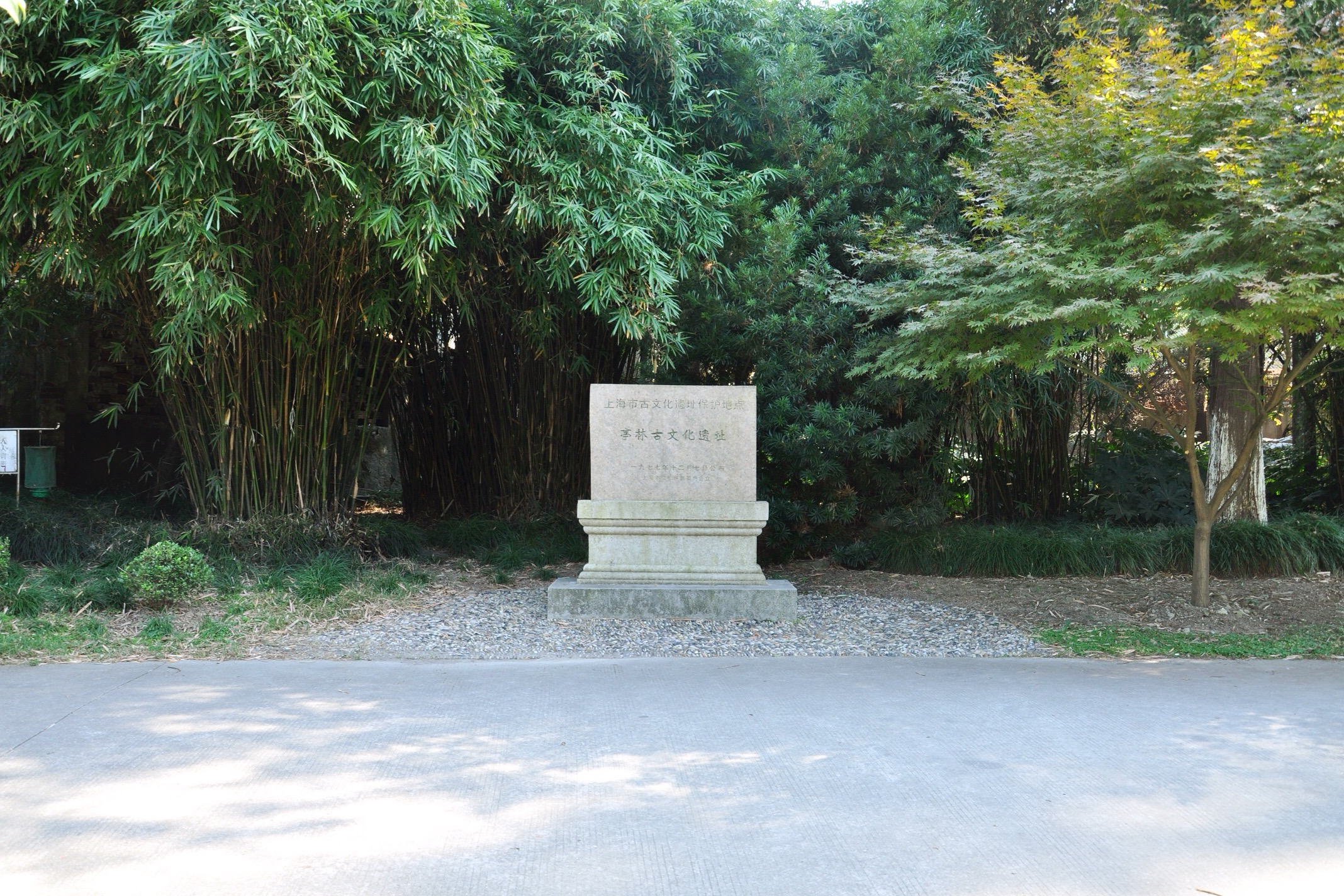
Tinglin Park

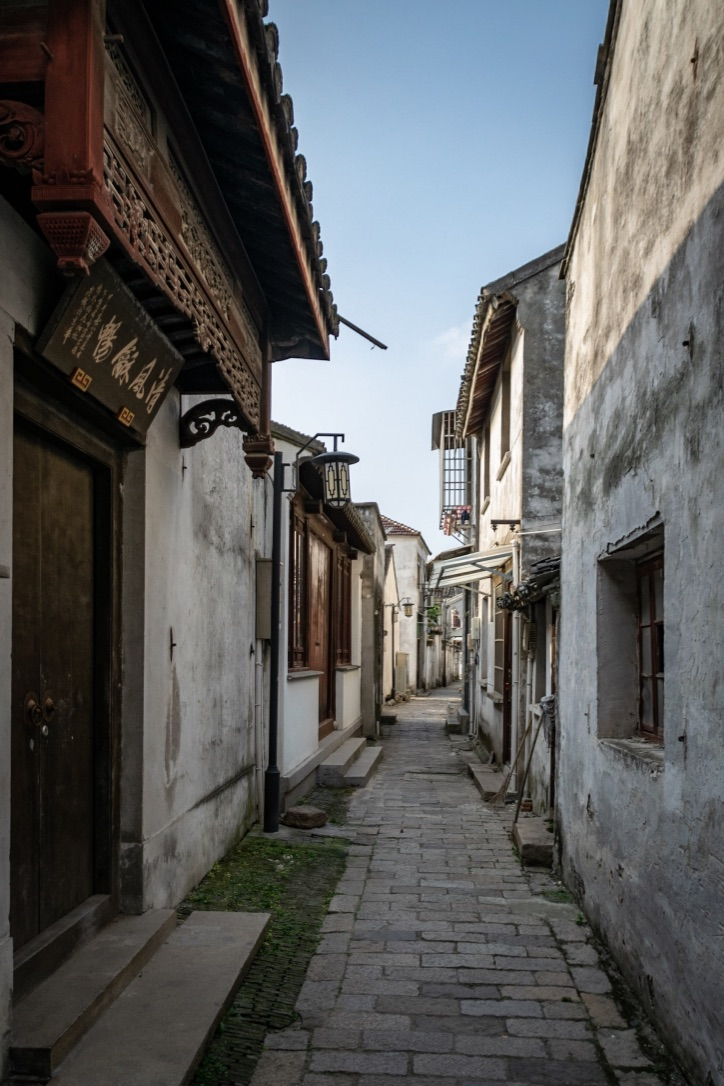
Bacheng Water Town

== Education ==
Panorama of Duke Kunshan University, a Sino-American joint venture between Duke University and Wuhan University

There are two institutions in Kunshan issuing at least bachelor's degree:

- Duke Kunshan University
- Applied Technology College of Soochow University

The city also hosts a variety of primary and secondary schools, both public and private:

- Canadian International School Kunshan
- Kunshan Middle School
- Kunshan West High School
- Kunshan Zhenchuan High School

== Transportation ==
=== Road ===
==== Expressways ====
- G2 Beijing–Shanghai Expressway
- G1501 Shanghai Ring Expressway
- S5 Changshu–Jiaxing Expressway
- S48 Shanghai–Yixing Expressway
- S58 Shanghai–Changzhou Expressway

==== National Highway ====
- China National Highway 312

=== Railway ===
- Kunshan Railway Station is a railway station on Jinghu Railway situated in the south of the downtown. It principally handles freight.
- Kunshan South Railway Station is a junction where Beijing-Shanghai High-Speed Railway and Shanghai–Nanjing Intercity High-Speed Railway link at. Besides, both Yangcheng Lake Railway Station and Huaqiao Railway Station are on the Shanghai–Nanjing Intercity High-Speed Railway.

=== Metro ===
A plan made to construct two metro lines running through the city center was approved by the Jiangsu provincial government. Kunshan is the first county-level city with a metro line. Line 11, Shanghai Metro has been extended to Huaqiao, Kunshan in 2013. Line 11 of the Suzhou Metro opened in June 2023.

== Notable people ==
- Gui Youguang
- Gu Yanwu
- Gong Xian
- Ding Shande
- Fei Junlong
- Zhang Xinyu
- Li Qin
- Qian Qihu
- Zhang Kejian

== Literature ==
- Einar Tangen: Cities of China – Kunshan. The Kunshan Way. Beijing: Foreign Languages Press, 2010; ISBN 978-7-119-06432-1.
