= Line 11 (Suzhou Metro) =

Metro line in Suzhou, Jiangsu, China

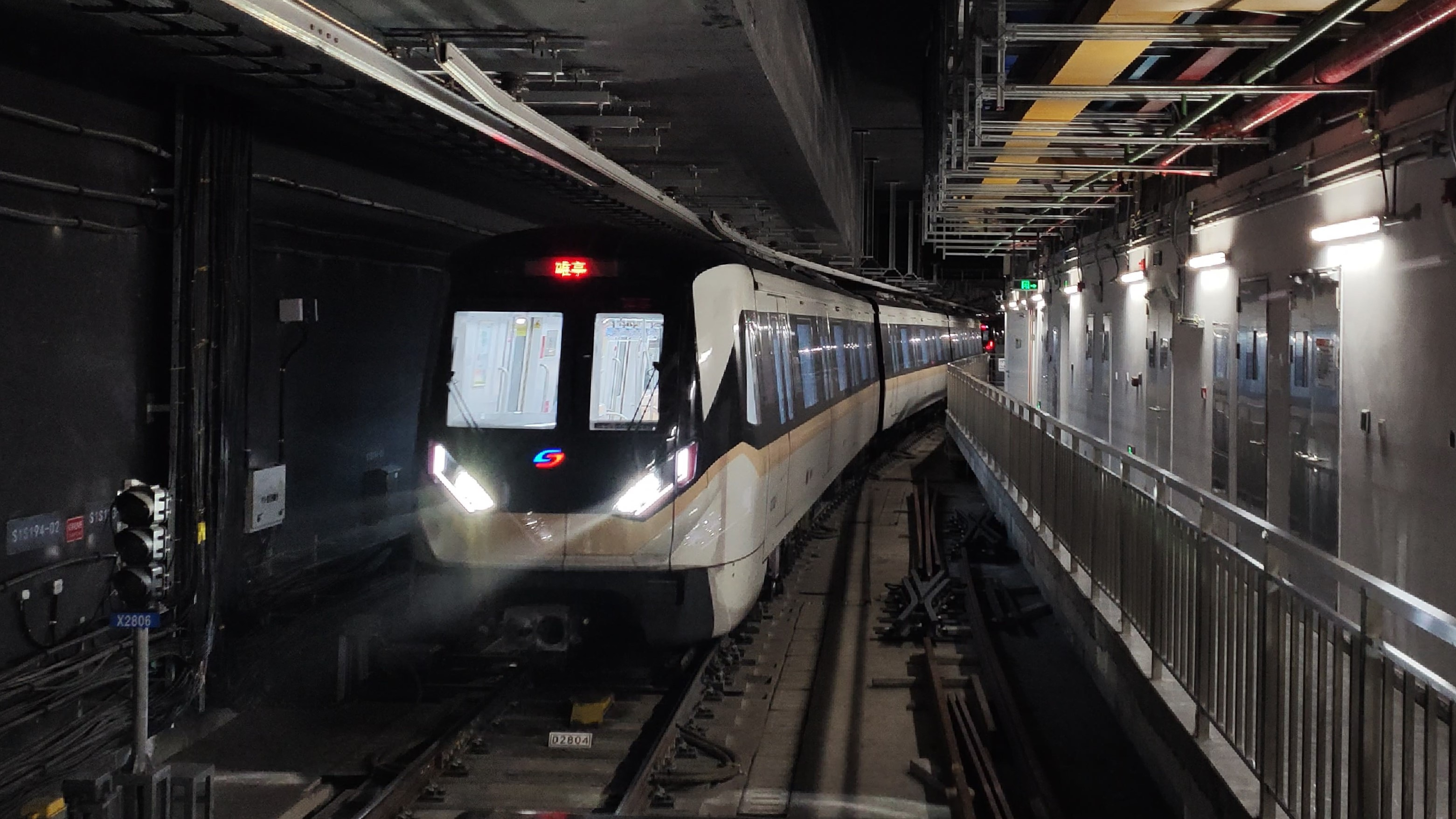
- A train of Suzhou Metro Line 11

Overview
- Status: In operation
- Owner: Suzhou Rail Transit Co., Ltd
- Termini: Weiting; Huaqiao
- Stations: 28

Service
- Type: Rapid transit
- System: Suzhou Metro
- Operator(s): Suzhou Rail Transit Co., Ltd
- Rolling stock: 6-car Class B

History
- Opened: June 24, 2023; 2 years ago

Technical
- Line length: 41.27 km (25.64 mi)
- Number of tracks: 2
- Character: Underground
- Track gauge: 1,435 mm (4 ft 8 1/2 in)
- Electrification: overhead wire
- Operating speed: 100 km/h (maximum)

Line 11 is a rapid transit line of the Suzhou Metro system. It was formerly known as Line S1 during planning and construction. Construction started on November 27, 2018. It opened on June 24, 2023. The line uses driverless 6-car Class B rolling stock operating up to 100 km/h (62 mph). Partial through-running with Line 3 began on December 23, 2023, and full through-running began on June 29, 2024.

== Description ==
Running west-east, the line mainly serves the urban area of Kunshan, and connects it to Suzhou Industrial Park in the west and nearby Shanghai in the east via a transfer at Huaqiao station to Line 11 of Shanghai Metro. The line is the first metro line in downtown Kunshan.

== Stations ==
=== Service routes ===
- Local service (L): Suzhou Xinqu Railway Station (Line 3) — Huaqiao
- Rapid Service (R): Gongqing — Huaqiao, eastern bound in the morning, and western bound in the night

Service Routes		Station name		Connections	Distance km	Location
L	R	English	Chinese	Connections	Distance km	Location
↑	Through service to/from Suzhou Xinqu Railway Station on 3					
●		Weiting	唯亭		0.00	SIP
●		Caoxieshan	草鞋山		2.12	SIP
●		Yangchenghu East	阳澄湖东		6.35	Kunshan
●		Zhengyi	正仪	AIH	7.95	Kunshan
●		Lianhugongyuan	莲湖公园		9.95	Kunshan
●		Zuchongzhigongyuan	祖冲之公园		11.27	Kunshan
●		Kunshan Wenhuayishuzhongxin	昆山文化艺术中心		12.18	Kunshan
●	●	Gongqing	共青		13.48	Kunshan
●	●	Jiangpu	江浦		14.41	Kunshan
●	|	Baimajing	白马泾		15.82	Kunshan
●	●	Yushanguangchang	玉山广场		17.20	Kunshan
●	|	Xiuyi	绣衣		18.55	Kunshan
●	●	Kunshan Chengshiguangchang	昆山城市广场		19.64	Kunshan
●	|	Jinpudaqiao East	金浦大桥东		20.86	Kunshan
●	|	Shunfanbeilu	顺帆北路		21.99	Kunshan
●	|	Yuchijing	鱼池泾		22.92	Kunshan
●	|	Baihetan	白河潭		23.94	Kunshan
●	●	Bingxi	兵希		25.04	Kunshan
●	|	Xiajiahegongyuan	夏驾河公园		26.33	Kunshan
●	|	Shengzhuang	盛庄		27.92	Kunshan
●	|	Zhangjilu South	章基路南		29.41	Kunshan
●	|	Xiaqiao	夏桥		31.25	Kunshan
●	●	Shentongjing	神童泾		33.51	Kunshan
●	|	Lujia	菉葭		34.85	Kunshan
●	●	Huaqiao Bolanzhongxin	花桥博览中心		37.16	Kunshan
●	●	Jishan	集善		38.65	Kunshan
●	|	Huaxigongyuan	花溪公园		39.97	Kunshan
●	●	Huaqiao	花桥	11	41.17	Kunshan

=== Through service ===
Through service between Line 3 and Line 11 started on December 23, 2023.

== Rolling stock ==
Fleet numbers	Year built	Time in service	Builder	Class	Number in service	No of car	Assembly	Rolling stock	Number	Depots	Line assigned	Notes
210 (35 sets)	2022-2023	2023-present	CRRC Nanjing Puzhen	B	210 (35 sets)	6	Tc+Mp+M - M + Mp+Tc	PM187	110101-113506 (1101-1135)	Xushuguan Depot; South Weiting Yard; Chaoyang Road Depot; Huaqiao Yard	3 11	
