= Kunshan Zhenchuan High School =

School in Jiangsu, China

Kunshan Zhenchuan High School is a public high school founded in 1997. The school is named after the famous Ming essayist Gui Youguang, who is also called Gui Zhenchuan. Zhenchuan High School became a key high school in Jiangsu Province in 1998 and then became a Three Star High School in Jiangsu in 2003. Later in 2004, it became a Four Star High School in Jiangsu.

Zhenchuan High School covers more than 149.3 acreages area. The construction area is up to 47369.23 square meters. The campus is divided into 3 parts, teaching area, sports area and living area.

The school motto is "sincerity and perseverance".
