= Tinglin Park =

Park in Kunshan, China

Tinglin Park (Chinese: 亭林公园; pīnyīn: tínglíngōngyuán) is located in the north-west of Kunshan, China. Because the Yufeng mountain (玉峰山) in this park looks like a saddle (Chinese: 马鞍; pīnyīn: mǎ'ān), the park was named Ma'anshan Park in 1906. In 1936, it was renamed to Tinglin Park in memory of the 17th-century scholar Gu Yanwu, also known as Gu Tinglin. It covers an area of more than 850 acres.

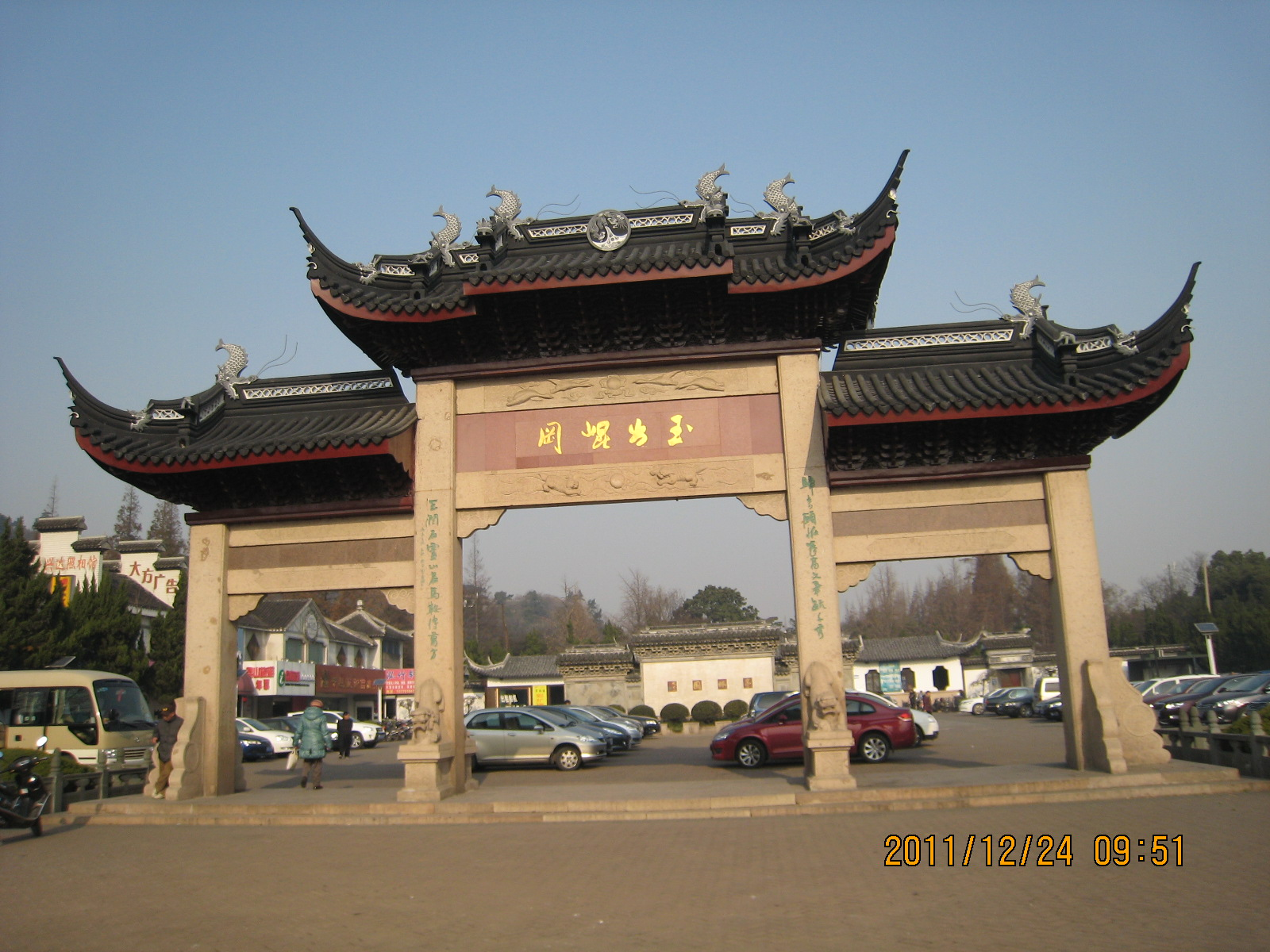
The entrance door of Tinglin Park

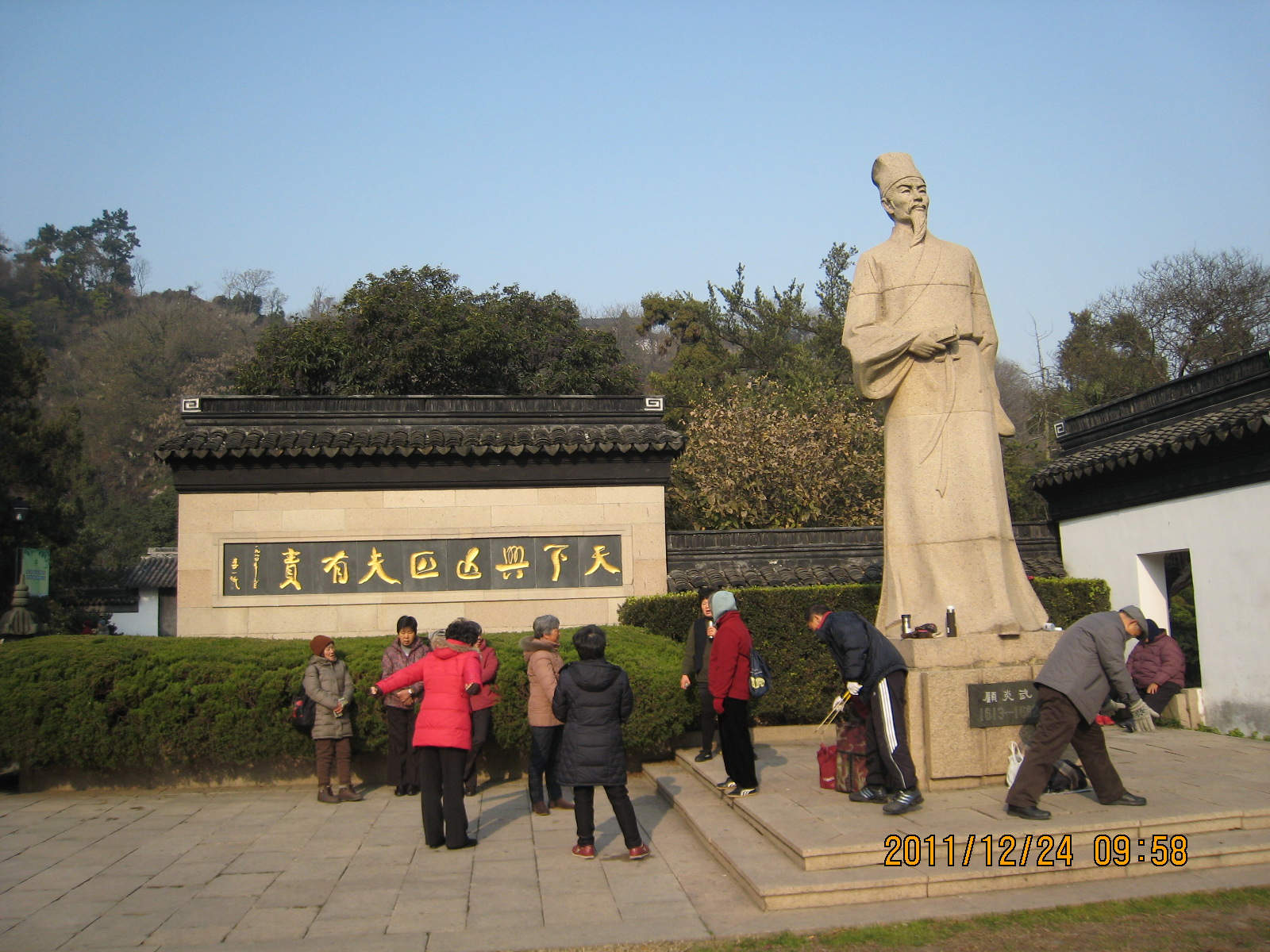
Statue of Gu Tinglin

== Brief Introduction ==
Tinglin Park has a long history and has several places of interest on its premises, lakes, monuments and pagodas. It is known as "the best among the mountains of the Jiangdong". Inside the park, there is a small gallery of Kunshan stones and a museum to Kunqu opera.

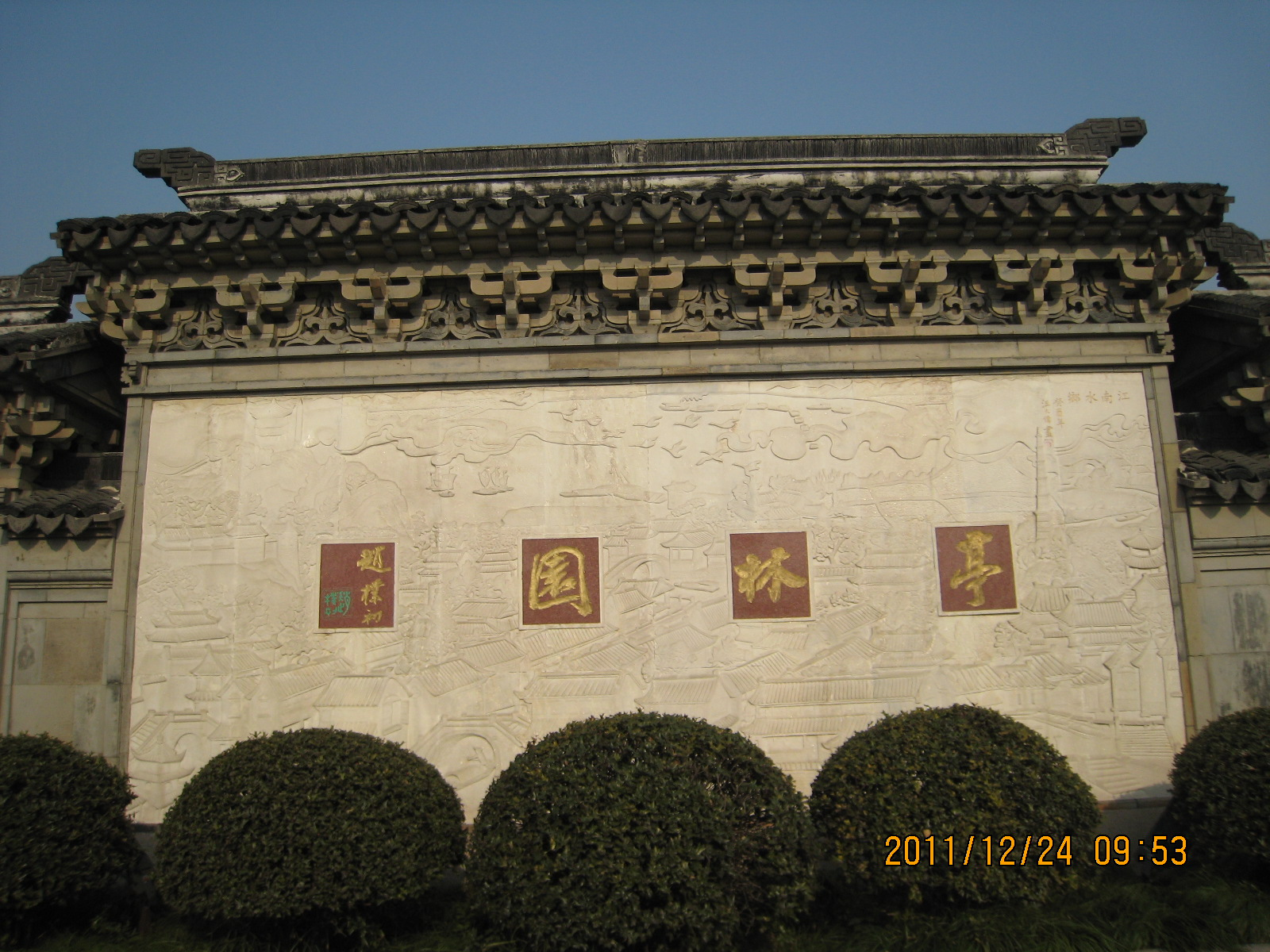
The inscription of Tinglin Park
