= Celebrity chef =

Someone well known in the culinary industry

A celebrity chef is a kitchen chef who is a celebrity. Today, chefs often become celebrities by presenting cookery advice and demonstrations, usually through the media of television and radio, or in printed publications. While television is ultimately the primary way for a chef to become a celebrity, some have achieved this through success in the kitchen, cookbook publications, and achieving awards such as Michelin stars, while others are home cooks who won competitions. In South Korea, a celebrity chef is referred to as a cheftainer.

Celebrity chefs can also influence cuisines across countries, with foreign cuisines being introduced in their natural forms for the first time due to the work of the chef to inform their viewers. Sales of certain foodstuffs can also be enhanced, such as when Delia Smith caused the sale of white eggs across the United Kingdom to increase by 10% in what has since been termed the "Delia effect". Endorsements are also to be expected from a celebrity chef, such as Ken Hom's range of bestselling woks in Europe, but can also lead to criticism over which endorsements are chosen such as when Marco Pierre White teamed up with Bernard Matthews Farms, or when Darren Simpson advised and endorsed fast-food restaurant KFC.

== History ==
Cooks rising to prominence date at least as far back as the Roman Empire. The Roman historian Livy dated the advent of Rome's decline with the cook's "rise above his station". "And it was then," he wrote, "that the cook, who had formerly the status of the lowest kind of slave, first acquired prestige, and what had once been servitude came to be thought of as an art." He was not alone in this belief: Roman sumptuary laws were passed to curb what was seen as a culture of excess.

The earliest chef to be credited with being a celebrity was the 16th century Italian, Bartolomeo Scappi. He was the personal chef to Pope Pius V, and is credited with writing the first cookbook, Opera Dell'arte del Cucinare in 1577.

The 19th-century French chef Marie-Antoine Carême has also since been referred to as a celebrity of his era, due to the complexity of his recipes.

Alexis Soyer's image was used to market a range of sauces produced by the Crosse & Blackwell company.

The first chef to achieve widespread fame and celebrity status was Alexis Soyer. Born in France, Soyer became the most celebrated cook in early Victorian England. In 1837, he became chef de cuisine at the Reform Club in London, where he designed the kitchens with Charles Barry. His exceptional cooking skills were combined with an excellent eye to marketing and self-publicity to ensure that he molded the public's perception of him. His image was even successfully used as a trademark to market a range of bottled sauces produced by Crosse & Blackwell.

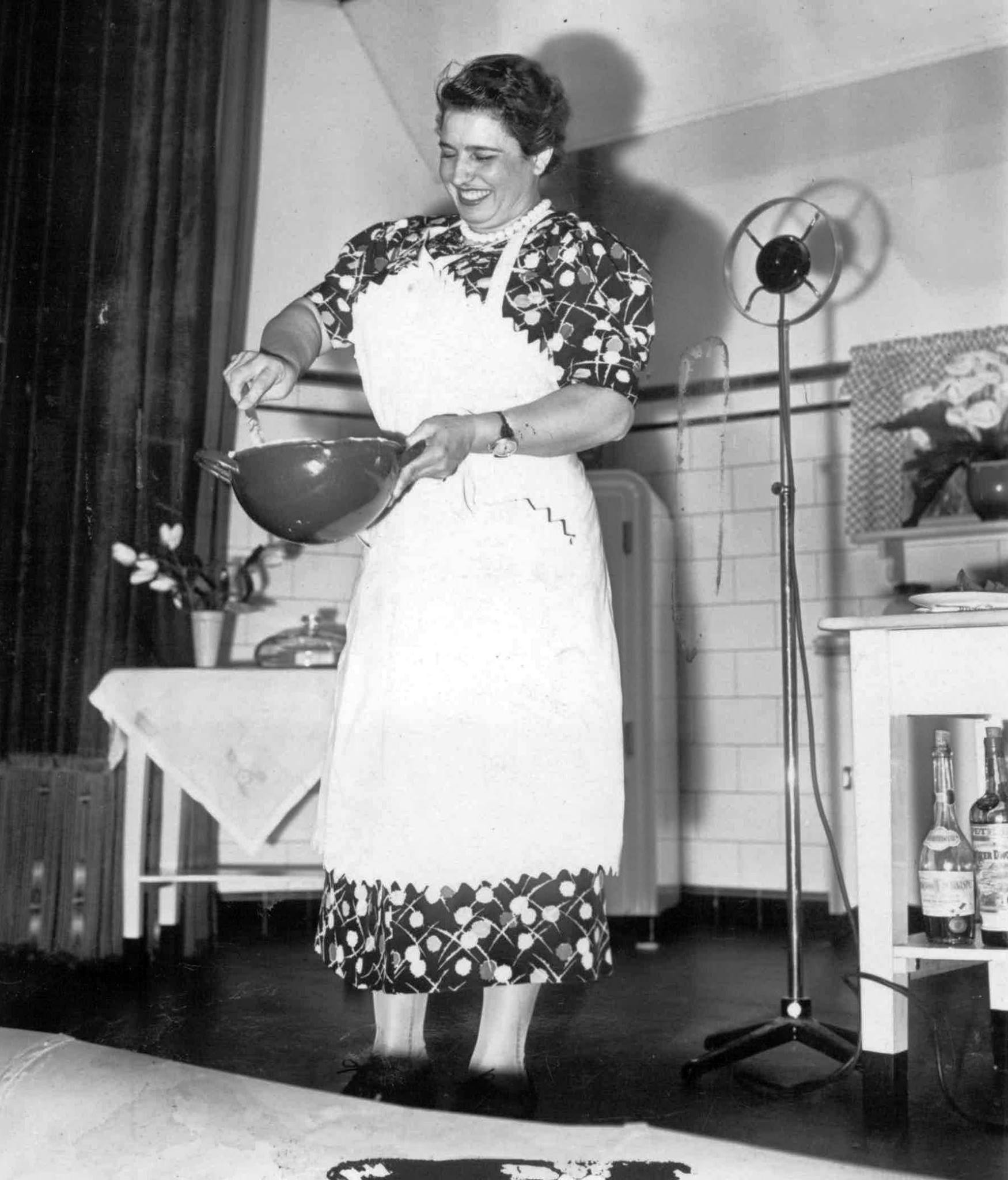
Doña Petrona giving a cooking class in Buenos Aires, 1938

Soyer also invented many popular new recipes and foods; he produced and marketed a popular drink made of a variety of fruits mixed with carbonated water, which he called Soyer's Nectar Soda Water. His special dish at the club, Soyer's Lamb Cutlets Reform, is still on the menu today. At the Reform Club, he instituted many innovations, including cooking with gas, refrigerators cooled by cold water, and ovens with adjustable temperatures. His kitchens were so famous that they were opened for conducted tours. When Queen Victoria was crowned on 28 June 1838, he prepared a breakfast for 2,000 people at the club.

He was also well known for his philanthropy. During the Great Irish Famine in April 1847, he implemented a network of soup kitchens to feed the poor. His "famine soup" was served to thousands of the poor for free. Soyer wrote a number of bestselling books about cooking, one of them even selling over a quarter of a million copies. His 1854 book A Shilling Cookery for the People was a recipe book for ordinary people who could not afford elaborate kitchen utensils or large amounts of exotic ingredients. Other works included The Gastronomic Regenerator (1846), The modern Housewife or, Ménagère and Soyer's Culinary Campaign (1857).

=== Television celebrity chefs ===
The earliest television celebrity chefs in Britain were Marcel Boulestin (1937 - Cook's Night Out), and Philip Harben (1946). The earliest television celebrity female chef in the UK was Fanny Cradock. She appeared on British television for over two decades, from the 1950s to the 1970s. She originally became popular following the publication of her first cookbook in 1949, The Practical Cook, and after gaining a cult following with cookery demonstrations in theatres around the country. Her television career came to an end when she appeared as a judge on reality television show The Big Time in 1976. She appeared to pretend to retch as contestant Gwen Troake described her menu for former Prime Minister Edward Heath. Presenter Esther Rantzen later described the incident as like "Cruella de Vil meets Bambi".

Described as America's first celebrity chef, Julia Child first appeared on American television in 1963 on the Boston-based WGBH-TV. She soon starred in her own show, The French Chef, which was followed by other shows. At the time of her death, she was credited by the media as having "demystified the art of cuisine for the home cook and inspired many of today's celebrity chefs". Such was her impact on American cuisine, her kitchen has been preserved on display at the Smithsonian Museum of American History.

In recent years, gaining a Michelin star has increased chefs' profiles sufficiently for them to be featured on television and become a household name. Marco Pierre White became the youngest chef in the world to achieve three Michelin stars, which went on to make him a household name and have one of his cookbooks, White Heat, described in 2005 as "possibly the most influential recipe book of the last 20 years" by food critic Jay Rayner. More typical of Michelin-starred restaurants in recent years, the success of Gordon Ramsay led to the commissioning of a five-part television series, Boiling Point, by the UK's Channel 4, which followed the chef as he opened his first solo restaurant, Restaurant Gordon Ramsay. While Joël Robuchon, Alain Ducasse, and Gordon Ramsay all run restaurant empires that each hold more than 10 Michelin stars, Ramsay is arguably the more famous chef due to his number of television shows broadcast internationally in the UK, the United States, and around the world.

Dedicated food-related television channels have also become a medium for chefs to become household names, for example in the United States, the Food Network features shows from celebrity chefs such as Paula Deen and Bobby Flay. While in the UK, the Good Food Channel has shows with chefs such as Rick Stein and Jamie Oliver. Certain chefs, such as Nigella Lawson, have had shows featuring on channels in more than one country.

=== MasterClass and YouTube Celebrity Chefs ===
MasterClass has a number of celebrity chefs including Thomas Keller, Massimo Bottura, Alice Waters, Roy Choi, and Gordon Ramsay. YouTube has brought other celebrity chefs such as Chef Jean-Pierre and Jamie Oliver to a wider audience.

== Influences ==
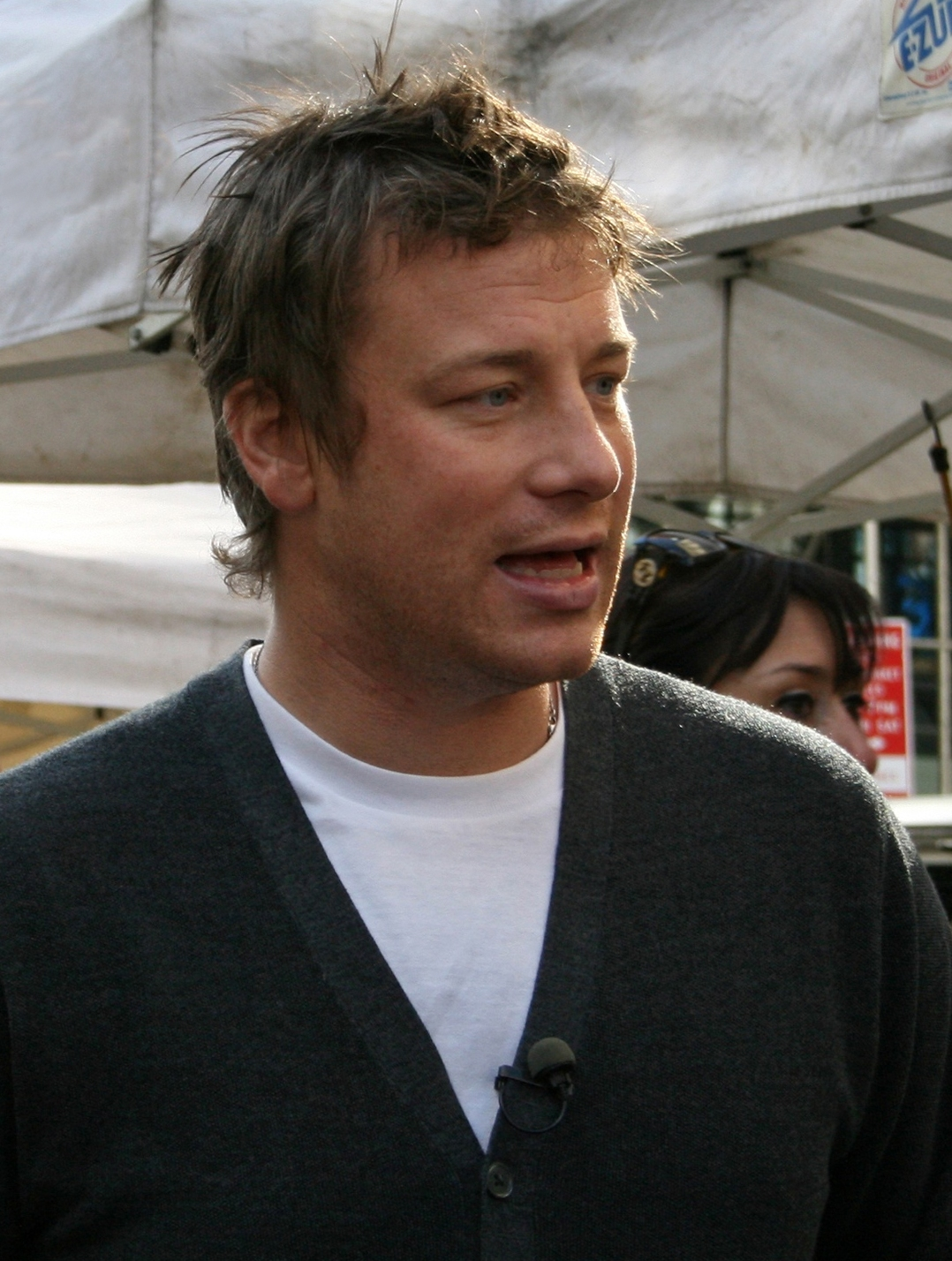
Jamie Oliver's campaign on the quality of school dinners changed the government standards in the United Kingdom.

Celebrity chefs have changed the styles of food that the general public consume. For example, despite the fact that Asian cuisine had been available in the UK since before the Victorian era, only due to the influence of chefs such as Ken Hom and Madhur Jaffrey in the early 1980s did the public become aware that these anglicised meals were not the authentic article. Tying into his first television series in 1984, the book Ken Hom's Chinese Cookery sold 1.2 million copies in the UK alone. Chef Jamie Oliver ran a campaign in the UK in his television show Jamie's School Dinners to introduce supposedly better eating habits in school dinners for schoolchildren. The campaign caused a change in food-standard requirements across the United Kingdom.

=== Endorsements ===
Endorsements by celebrity chefs have led to increased demands for certain food products. Both Jamie Oliver and Nigella Lawson caused a surge in sales of goose fat after including it in recipes, and Ken Hom's first television series caused a surge in sales of Peking ducks. Endorsements by Delia Smith became so well known that the "Delia effect" was added to the British dictionary in 2001.

Product range tie-ins on housewares have also becoming a staple part of a celebrity chef's income. More than 4.7 million of Ken Hom-endorsed wok range have been sold in Europe. The writing of cookbooks has also been a regular product of the celebrity chefs, from both those who have gained Michelin stars, and homestyle cooks who have had books produced as a tie-in for television shows.

Certain endorsements by celebrity chefs have led to high levels of criticism from the food industry and the public. In 2011, Australian chef Darren Simpson created a range of burgers for fast-food restaurant Kentucky Fried Chicken, leading to comments being posted on Twitter such as "Darren Simpson you complete and utter sell-out. KFC? Seriously?". Australian television chef Colin Fassnidge said that the move by Simpson resulted in him becoming a laughing stock, and that while celebrity chefs can make a fortune from such deals, they also risk their credibility. In the UK, Marco Pierre White drew criticism after teaming up with Bernard Matthews Farms in March 2010 to create a range of ready meals that were dropped after a year of production.

== Healthiness of recipes ==
A 2012 paper published in the BMJ found that recipes in top-selling books by television chefs (Nigella Lawson, Hugh Fearnley-Whittingstall, Jamie Oliver, and Lorraine Pascale) were less healthy than supermarket ready meals. Neither ready meals nor the chefs' recipes met national or international recommendations for a balanced diet.

== See also ==
- Chef
- Development chef
- Personal chef
- Cook (profession)
