= Bartolomeo Scappi =

Italian chef (c. 1500–1577)

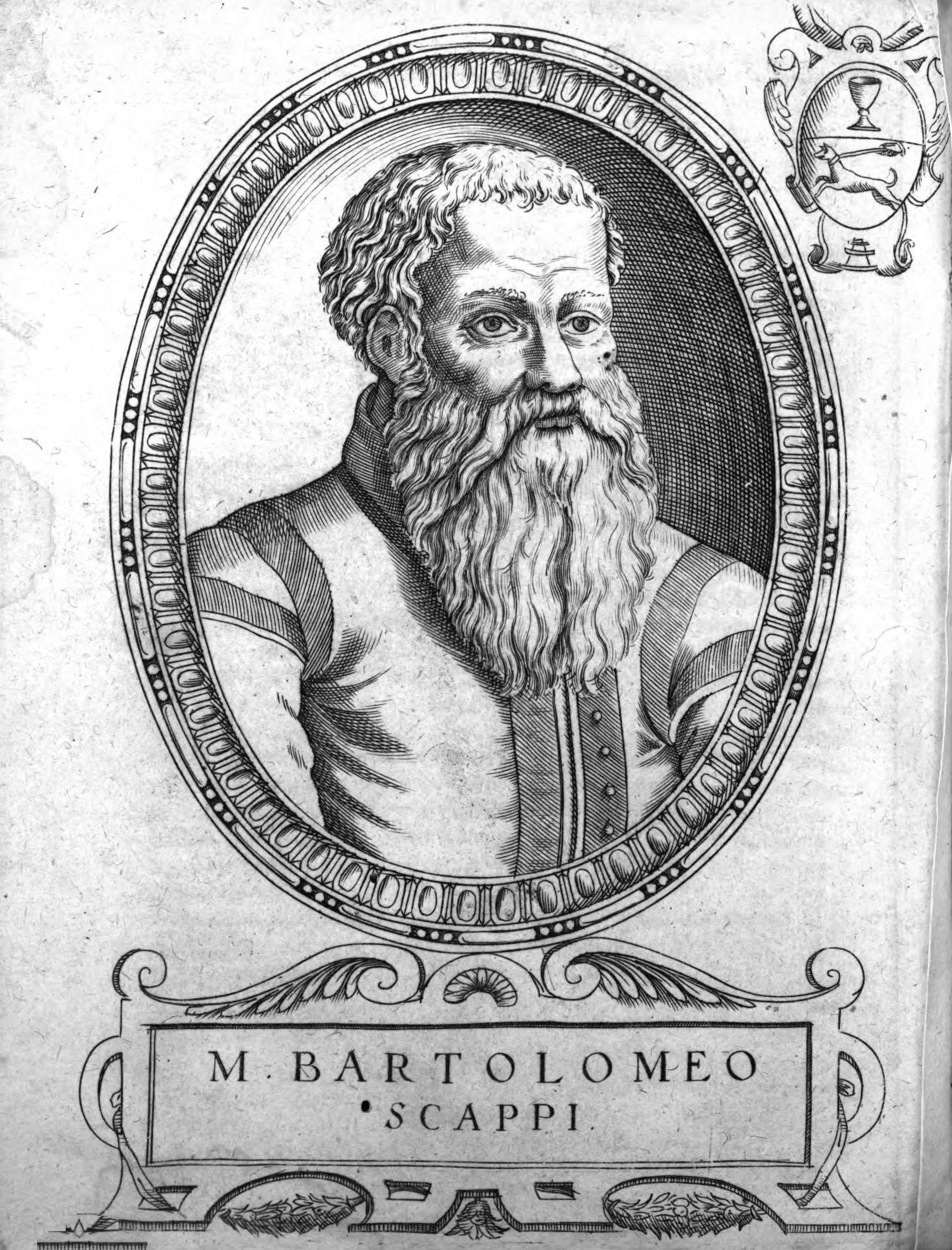
- Bartolomeo Scappi
- Born: c. 1500
- Died: 13 April 1577 (77 Years)
- Occupations: Chef, food writer
- Known for: Opera dell'arte del cucinare Chef of Pius IV and Pius V.

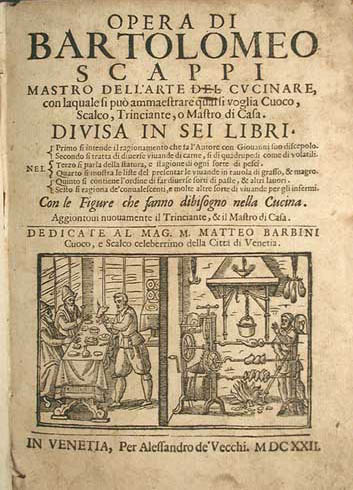
Edition of 1622

Bartolomeo Scappi (c. 1500 – 13 April 1577) was a famous Italian Renaissance chef and food writer, best known for his high-profile clients, including being the personal chef of Pope Pius IV.

== Biography ==
Scappi came from Dumenza in Lombardy, Italy, according to the inscription on a stone plaque in the church of Luino. In April 1536, he had organised a banquet while in the service of Cardinal Lorenzo Campeggio, implying that he had reached professional maturity by this time. From this Terence Scully surmised that he must have been born at the beginning of the 16th century. It is assumed that Scappi was under the employment of Campeggio until his death in July 1539. Some time after then he entered the service of Cardinal Marino Grimano, and after his death on 28 September 1546, he may have been in the employment of Rodolfo Pio da Carpi, at whose behest he adopted an apprentice named Giovanni, and to whom he was very grateful. By the spring of 1549 he was likely serving Cardinal Jean DuBellay, or one of the Italian guests attending the celebration he organised for the birth of the Duke of Orleans. He served several other cardinals after this, then began to serve Pope Pius IV, entering the service of the Vatican kitchen. By the 1560s he was most probably composing the Opera, and would have reached the peak of his career. In 1564, he wrote that he had served Pope Pius IV frogs which had been prepared in the manner that the pope was accustomed too, he had often prepared barley gruel for him. He continued to work as a chef for Pope Pius V. Scappi is often considered one of the first internationally renowned celebrity chefs.

He gained new fame in 1570 when his monumental cookbook, Opera dell'arte del cucinare, was published. In the book, he lists about 1,000 recipes of Renaissance cuisine and describes cooking techniques and tools, giving the first known picture of a fork. He declared Parmesan to be the best cheese on earth, and noted that "the liver of [a] domestic goose raised by the Jews is of extreme size and weighs [between] two and three pounds", indicating that Jews of the time were practising the force-feeding used to produce foie gras. Reprints of Opera were continually published from 1570 to 1643.

Scappi died on 13 April 1577, and was buried in the church of Saints Vincenzo and Anastasio alla Regola in Rome, dedicated to cooks and bakers.

The Opera dell'arte del cucinare was partially translated into Spanish (Libro de cozina, 1599, by Diego Granado) and Dutch (Koocboec oft familieren keukenboec, 1612, by Antonius Magirus). There is an English translation by the food historian Terence Scully (2008) and modern Dutch translation by Ike Cialona (2015).

== Sources ==
- Ginor, Michael A. (1999), Foie Gras: A Passion, John Wiley & Sons, ISBN 0-471-29318-0.
- Levillain, Philippe (2002), The Papacy: An Encyclopedia, Routledge (UK), ISBN 0415922283.
- Riley, Gillian (2007), The Oxford Companion to Italian Food, Oxford University Press, ISBN 978-0198606178.
- Rolland, Jacques L. (2006), The Food Encyclopedia, Robert Rose, ISBN 0778801500.
- Schildermans, Jozef M. (2007), Lieve schat, wat vind je lekker? Het Koocboec van Antonius Magirus (1612) en de Italiaanse keuken van de renaissance, Davidsfonds, ISBN 9789058265005.
- Benporat, Claudio (2005), Bartolomeo Scappi, il mistero svelato, Appunti di gastronomia, nr. 46.
