= Development chef =

Trained chef who develops new food products

A development chef is a trained chef specialising in the development of new dishes or food products.

With food companies, this type of chef often has the responsibility of creating new pre-prepared meals and food products. Within health care, the chef is often responsible for the development of variations on mainstream meals, to fit different types of diets while still having an appetizing meal. Individual restaurants rarely have development chefs, but restaurant chains often do. Here the chef is typically responsible for designing dishes and ensuring that the local kitchen staff can create/prepare them to an exact standard.

== Training ==
Development chefs need sufficient training in culinary arts, experimental food methods and food science plus adequate experience in the actual preparation of dishes. In practice, this means most development chefs will have a background as a professional chef.

== See also ==
- Celebrity chef
- Personal chef
- Chef

== Sources ==
- What does a development chef do
