= Wanshan Park =

Park in Danyang

Coordinates: 31°58′54.4″N 119°35′09.6″E

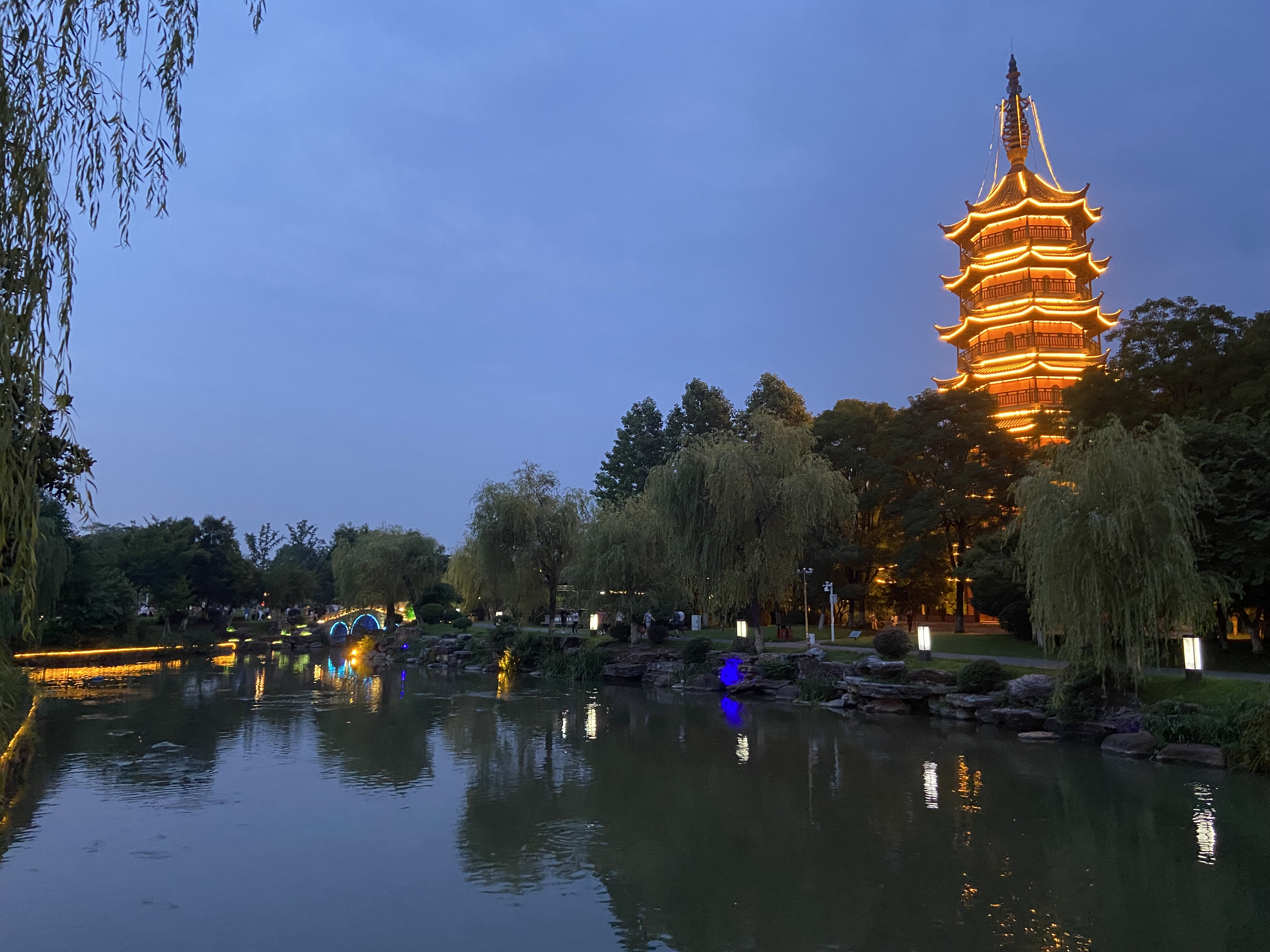
Wanshan Park and Wanshan Pagoda

Wanshan Park (Simplified Chinese: 万善公园; Traditional Chinese: 萬善公園; pinyin: Wànshàn gōngyuán) is a park in Danyang, Jiangsu, China. The park includes pavilions, terraces, towers and winding corridors, as well as Chinese parasols, odd stones, rivers and bridges.

== History ==
The main feature of Wanshan Park, a 47.76 meters-tall, seven-story pagoda, was built in 1627. The pagoda is made of bricks and wood.

== Features ==
There are four scenic spots: the City Gate Tower, Buddha Temple, Imperial Boat Area, and the Phoenix Valley. These spots were constructed in Qing Dynasty style, but were built near the end of the 20th century.

The city gate tower is a simple construction which is 280 meters lang and 9 meters high. The attractions of Buddha is constructed in a typical architectural style of the Ming Dynasty.
