= La Belle Assiette =

- Company type: Privately held company
- Website type: Online marketplace (formerly); now blog
- Founded: 2012 (Paris, France)
- Headquarters: Paris, {{{location_country}}}
- Area served: Europe
- Founders: Stephen Leguillon; Giorgio Riccò
- Key people: Stephen Leguillon (Founder & CEO); Giorgio Riccò (Founder & CTO)
- Employees: 30
- Website: labelleassiette.co.uk
- Launched: February 2012

La Belle Assiette was an online private chef booking platform, headquartered in Paris, France, that enabled users to browse and book menus and chefs. The service was available in six countries and had over 700 registered chefs. Co-founders Stephen Leguillon and Giorgio Riccò were CEO and COO (formerly CTO), respectively.

By 2025, La Belle Assiette had discontinued its private-chef booking service and instead operates solely as a culinary blog, featuring articles on cooking tips, recipes, nutrition, and food culture.

== History ==
La Belle Assiette was founded in 2012 in Paris, France, by entrepreneurs Stephen Leguillon and Giorgio Riccò after they met at ESCP Europe. Inspired by platforms such as Airbnb and Uber, the founders applied a similar on-demand model to the restaurant sector. Via the platform, users could browse menus and book a chef—who arrived with ingredients and equipment and handled cleanup.

Initially supported by a private business angel for a year, the start-up then received backing from Bpifrance in 2012. In October 2014, La Belle Assiette raised €1.3 million, bringing total funding to €1.7 million—enabling expansion and the opening of a London office.

== Transition to blog ==
As of mid-2025, the website’s content is exclusively blog posts—cooking guides, food news, nutrition, and lifestyle content—without any booking functionality for chefs.
