= Daoshu =

Daoshu may refer to:

- Daoshu (刀术; 刀術; 'Sword arts'), a wushu routine in which a dao (Chinese sword) is wielded
- Daoshu, Jiangsu, town in Danyang, Jiangsu, China
- Tik Tok (G.E.M. song) (倒数; 倒數; dàoshǔ), 2018 Mandopop single by G.E.M.
