= Jizi Temple =

Temple in Danyang, Jiangsu, China

Jizi Temple (simplified Chinese: 季子庙; traditional Chinese: 季子廟; pinyin: Jìzǐ Miào) is a temple in Danyang, Jiangsu province, China. It is famous for not only the scenic spots and historical sites such like Shizi Monument, Xiaoshui Stone, and Gihe Bridge, but also the tourist attraction known as the Boiling Wells.

== History ==
Jizi Temple was built in order to honor and sacrifice Jizi after his death, which has two thousand years of history. Jizi, whose given name is Zha (Chinese: 札), was the youngest son of Mengshou, the emperor of Wu during the Spring and Autumn period (770-476 B.C.). He was a person of virtue, who not only had a noble character, but was also is a far-sighted politician and diplomatist. He made a great contribution to improving Huaxia culture.

== Boiling Wells ==
The Boiling Wells of Jizi Temple are natural mineral springs is located beside a pool in front of the temple. According to historical records, there were originally a hundred wells (some of which were "boiling wells"), however flooding of the nearby Xiangcao River covered many of them, leaving only six remaining.

Water in the boiling wells is constantly bubbling, giving it the appearance of boiling, although the bubbling is actually caused by gas released from cracks beneath the wells. The water of each well is drinkable, and each well has a different flavour, apparently similar to beer or soft drinks.
