= Jiangsu Danyang Senior High School =

School in Danyang, Jiangsu, China

Jiangsu Danyang Senior High School (Chinese: 江苏丹阳高级中学; pinyin: jiāng sū dān yáng gāojí Zhōng xúe) located in Danyang, Jiangsu, China, is a key school in Jiangsu Province, China.

== History ==
Its predecessor, National Social School, was established in Qingmuguan, Sichuan, in 1941. In 1946, it moved to Danyang and was renamed Jiangsu Danyan Senior High School. In the past 70 years, it has gone through all the vicissitudes of life, but it has cultivated many talents. Now it is a five star school in Jiangsu Province.

== Land area ==
The school grounds cover an area of 114,000 square meters, construction area of 67,600 square meters, green area of 36,000 square meters, and its green coverage rate is 42.1%.
