= Chef Jean-Pierre =

French chef (born 1952)

Jean-Pierre Bréhier
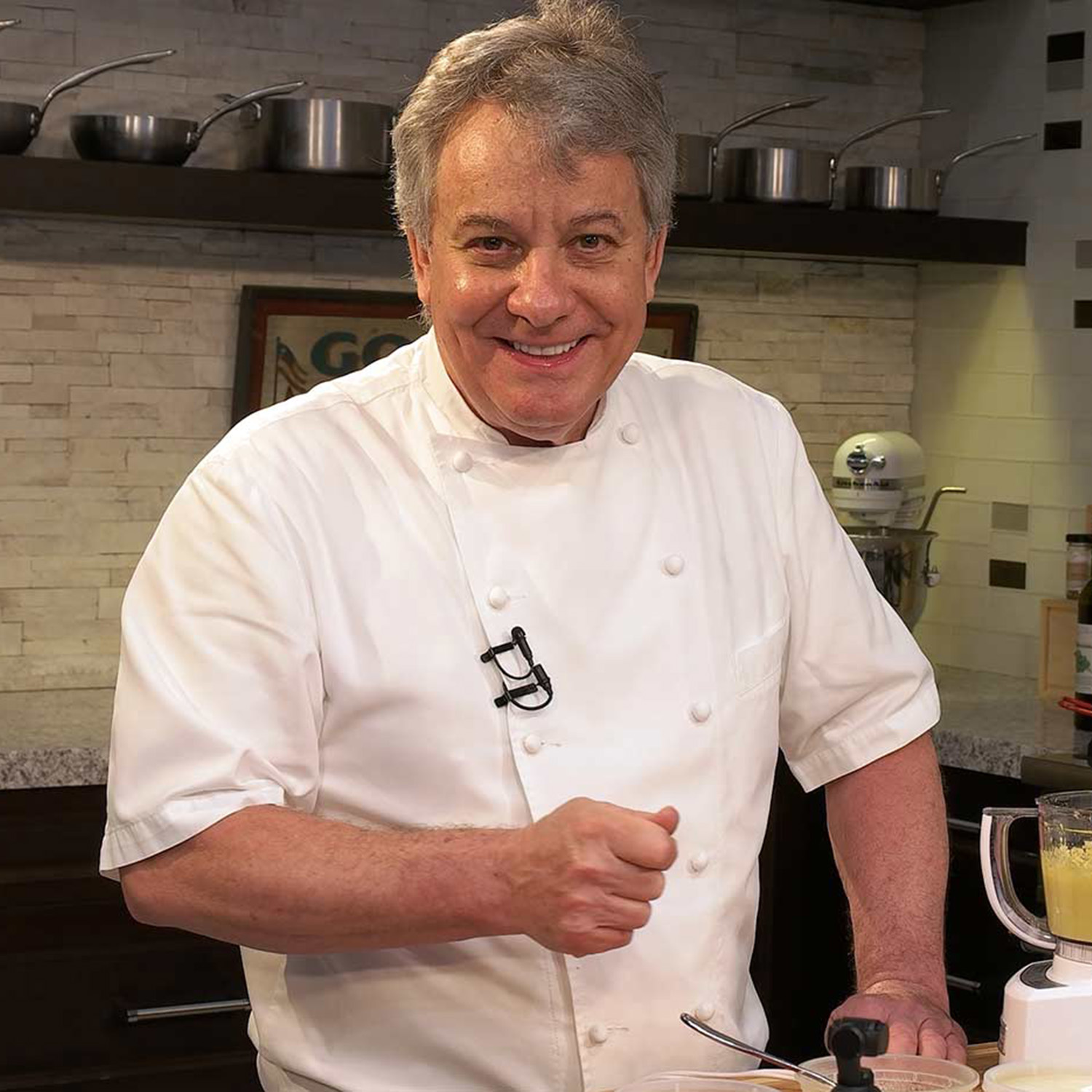
- Bréhier in 2021
- Born: 1952 (age 73–74); Aix-en-Provence, France
- Culinary career
- Cooking style: French cuisine, Italian cuisine, American cuisine
- Previous restaurant(s): The Left Bank, Fort Lauderdale, Florida (1976–1997)
- Television show(s): Sunshine Cuisine (1994), Incredible Cuisine (1998), 90-Second Gourmet, Gourmet Minutes
- Award won: James Beard Foundation nomination for Best Culinary Video ("Sunshine Cuisine")
- Website: www.chefjeanpierre.com

Jean-Pierre Bréhier (born 1952) is a French chef, television personality, cookbook author and YouTuber. As of September 14, 2026, his YouTube channel Chef Jean-Pierre has over 2.47 million subscribers and 275 million views. His cooking tips have been cited alongside other celebrity chefs.

== Personal life ==
Born in Aix-en-Provence in the south of France, Bréhier was the youngest of five children in a family where culinary arts were highly valued. His mother, Yolande, a Cordon Bleu-trained chef, was a significant influence on his early culinary development.

Bréhier moved to the United States at the age of 21.

== Career ==
At age 12, he started working at a local butcher shop, where he learned charcuterie. Choosing to pursue a career in gastronomy, he undertook a formal apprenticeship at L'Ousteau de Baumaniere, a three-star Michelin restaurant in Provence. His apprenticeship continued on the French Riviera, where he gained experience at L'Oasis in La Napoule, Le Vendome in Aix-en-Provence, and the Carlton Cannes Hotel.

=== Restaurateur ===
In 1976, Bréhier opened his own restaurant, The Left Bank, which became known for its innovative cuisine, impeccable service, and Chef Jean-Pierre's personal input. For 22 years, it was considered one of the United States' finest dining establishments by Bon Appetit, Condé Nast, Gourmet Magazine, and Travel & Leisure. He sold the restaurant in 1997.

Gourmet Magazine named The Left Bank one of the best in South Florida, and its No. 1 selection in Fort Lauderdale. Condé Nast magazine voted it one of the 100 best restaurants in America.

=== Television and radio ===
In 1994, Bréhier launched his first national television series, Sunshine Cuisine, which aired on PBS. This series, comprising 80 episodes, was broadcast on 280 PBS stations across the United States, Japan, China, and Australia. The same year, he published his first cookbook, Sunshine Cuisine, mirroring the themes of his television show. The James Beard Foundation nominated Sunshine Cuisine for Best Culinary Video for his contributions to the culinary arts.

In 1994, Bréhier also hosted his own Saturday morning radio talk show on WFTL 1400 AM. In 1998, Bréhier returned to PBS with his second television series, Incredible Cuisine, which featured 26 episodes broadcast on 250 PBS stations nationwide. He collaborated with Time Life to publish his second cookbook, also titled Incredible Cuisine. In January 2006, Bréhier released his third cookbook, Cooking 101, an interactive book featuring recipes inspired by the popular courses offered at his culinary school.

Bréhier's television appearances extended to being a frequent guest chef on the Today Show, where he appeared 25 times, as well as on Larry King Live, Crook & Chase, Lifetime, and The Food Network. Between 2004 and 2012, he had two public television interstitial series distributed to all 350 public television stations through Fast Focus Media, LLC called The 90 Second Gourmet and Gourmet Minutes.

=== Cookbooks ===
Bréhier has authored three cookbooks. His first two books, Sunshine Cuisine (1994) and Incredible Cuisine (January 1997), are directly tied to his television series of the same names. These publications showcase his signature recipes and delve into his culinary philosophies and techniques. Incredible Cuisine was Time Life's best selling cookbook for two years.

In 2006, Chef Jean-Pierre released his third cookbook, Cooking 101. This interactive book compiles recipes from some of the popular courses taught at his school, Chef Jean-Pierre's Cooking School. The book won a Platinum Aurora Award for his ability to simplify and elucidate complex culinary concepts for aspiring chefs and home cooks alike.

=== Culinary school ===
Chef Jean-Pierre's Cooking School, established in 1996, has taught over 17,000 students. His cooking school partnered with Holland American cruises as an excursion experience. Offering practical and demonstration classes, the school catered to both gourmet cooks looking to refine their techniques and beginners taking their first steps in the culinary world. Most classes were personally taught by Chef Jean-Pierre, emphasizing an informal, fun, and educational approach to cooking.

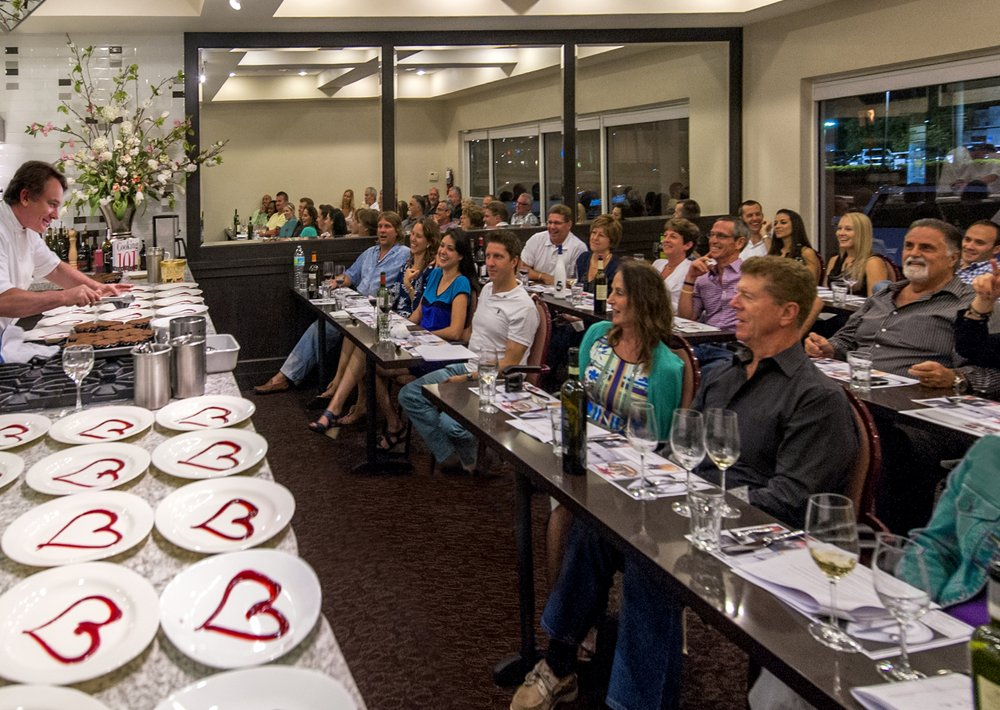
Bréhier instructing culinary students

=== YouTube ===
Chef Jean-Pierre uploaded his first YouTube video on November 1, 2006, primarily for his friends and students. In 2020, he officially launched his YouTube channel, Chef Jean-Pierre Cooking School.

As of July 1, 2024, his channel exceeded 1.88 million subscribers with over 399 videos, and over 193.9 million views. His YouTube channel features recipe tutorials and cooking tips, techniques, and advice. His YouTube has received positive reviews for being accessible, child friendly, and including full instructions for all his recipes.
