= Kaitai Bridge =

Kaitai Bridge 开泰桥
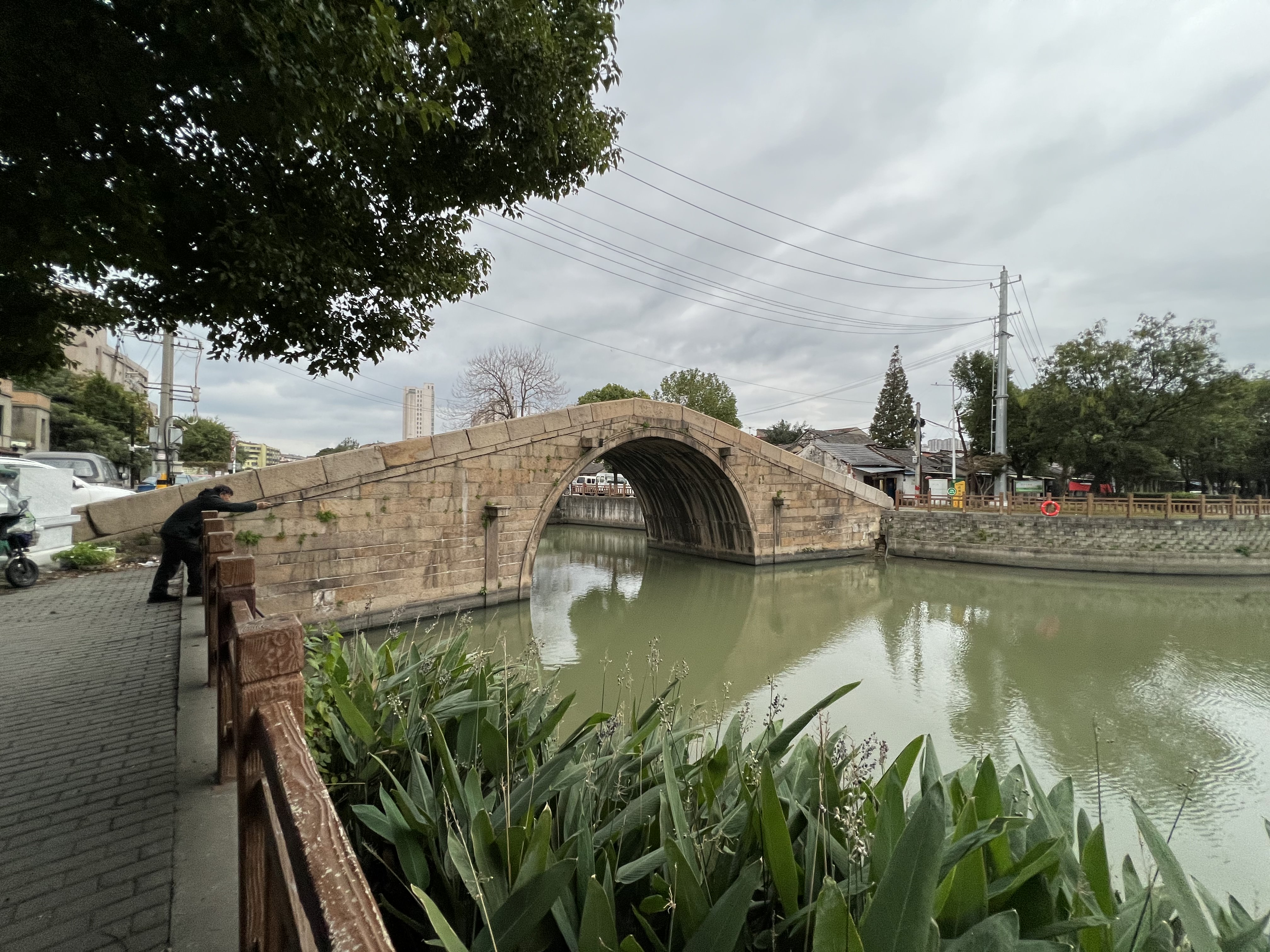
- Kaitai Bridge in November 2023
- Coordinates: 31°59′36″N 119°34′35″E
- Carries: Pedestrians
- Crosses: A tributary of the Grand Canal
- Locale: Yunyang Subdistrict, Danyang, Jiangsu, China

Characteristics
- Design: Arch bridge
- Material: Stone
- Total length: 45 metres (148 ft)
- Width: 7 metres (23 ft)
- Height: 8 metres (26 ft)

History
- Construction end: Ming dynasty

The Kaitai Bridge (simplified Chinese: 开泰桥; traditional Chinese: 開泰橋; pinyin: Kāitài Qiáo) is a historic stone arch bridge over a tributary of the Grand Canal in Yunyang Subdistrict, Danyang, Jiangsu, China. The bridge is 45 metres (148 ft) long, and 7 metres (23 ft) wide, and 8 metres (26 ft) high.

== History ==
Kaitai Bridge was originally built between 1572 and 1620 during the Wanli era of the Ming dynasty (1368–1644), but because of war and natural disasters has been rebuilt numerous times since then. In December 2011, it has been inscribed as a provincial-level cultural protective heritage site by the Government of Jiangsu.

== Gallery ==
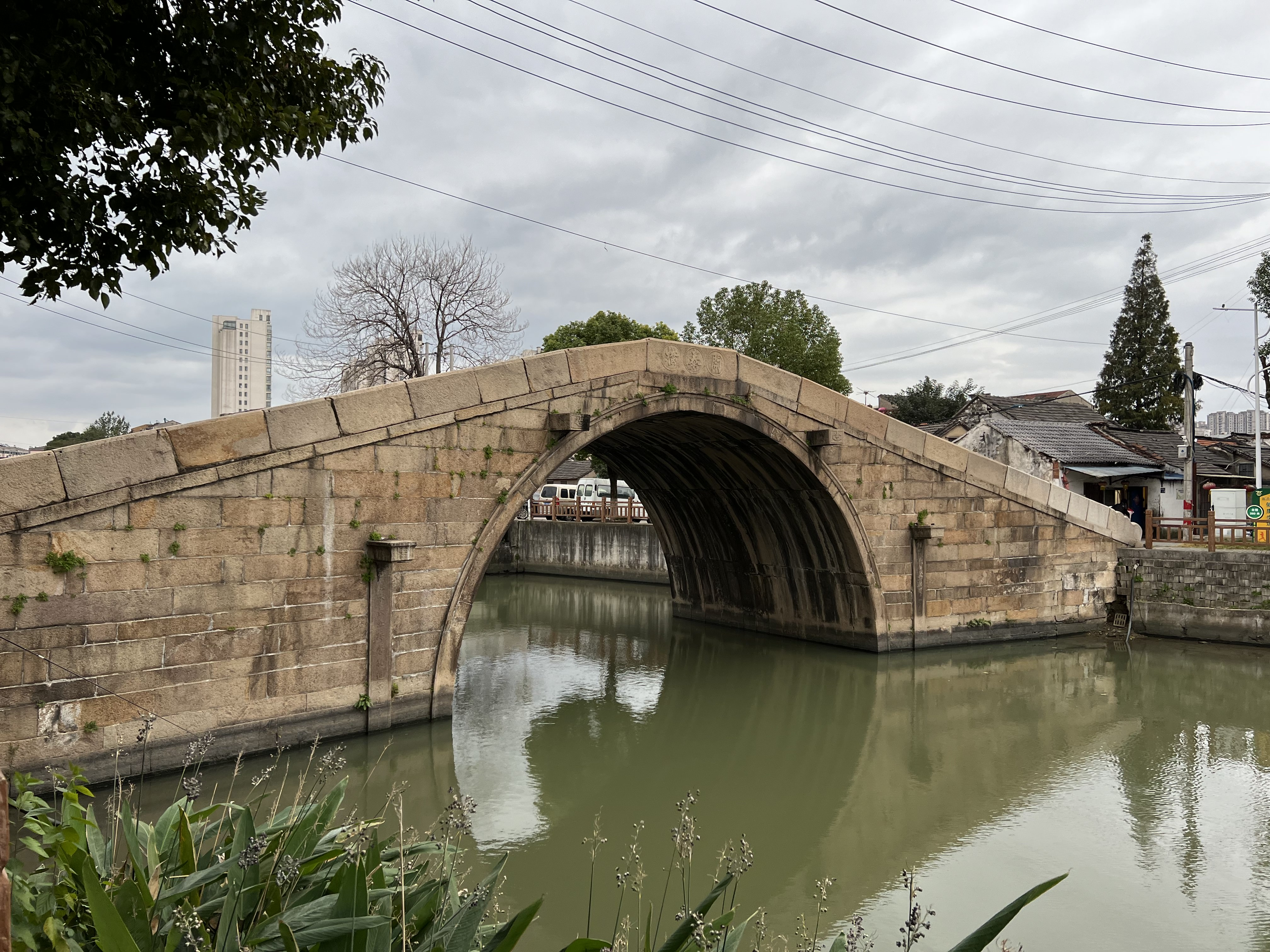
Kaitai Bridge in November 2023

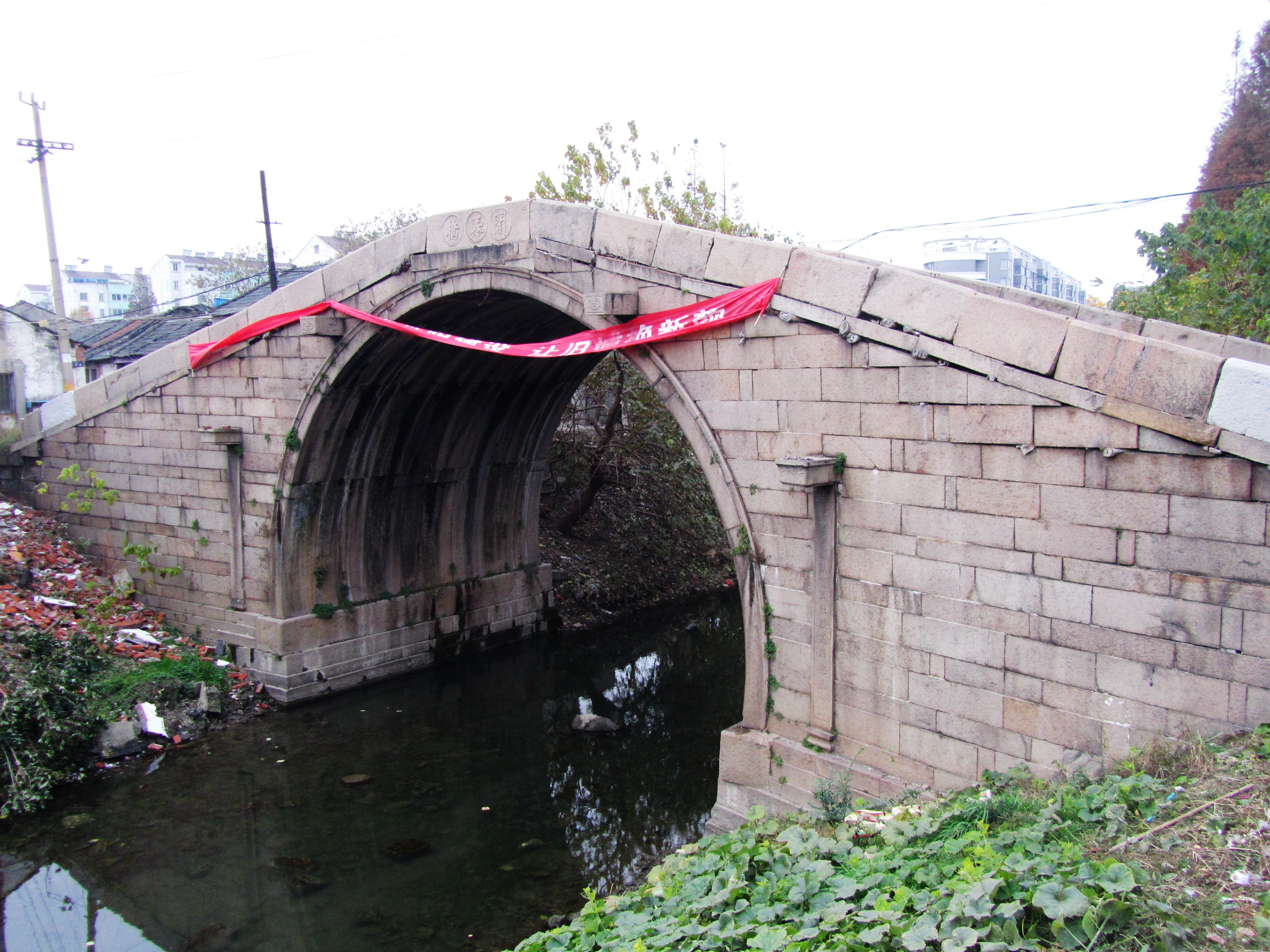
East side of the bridge in December 2012

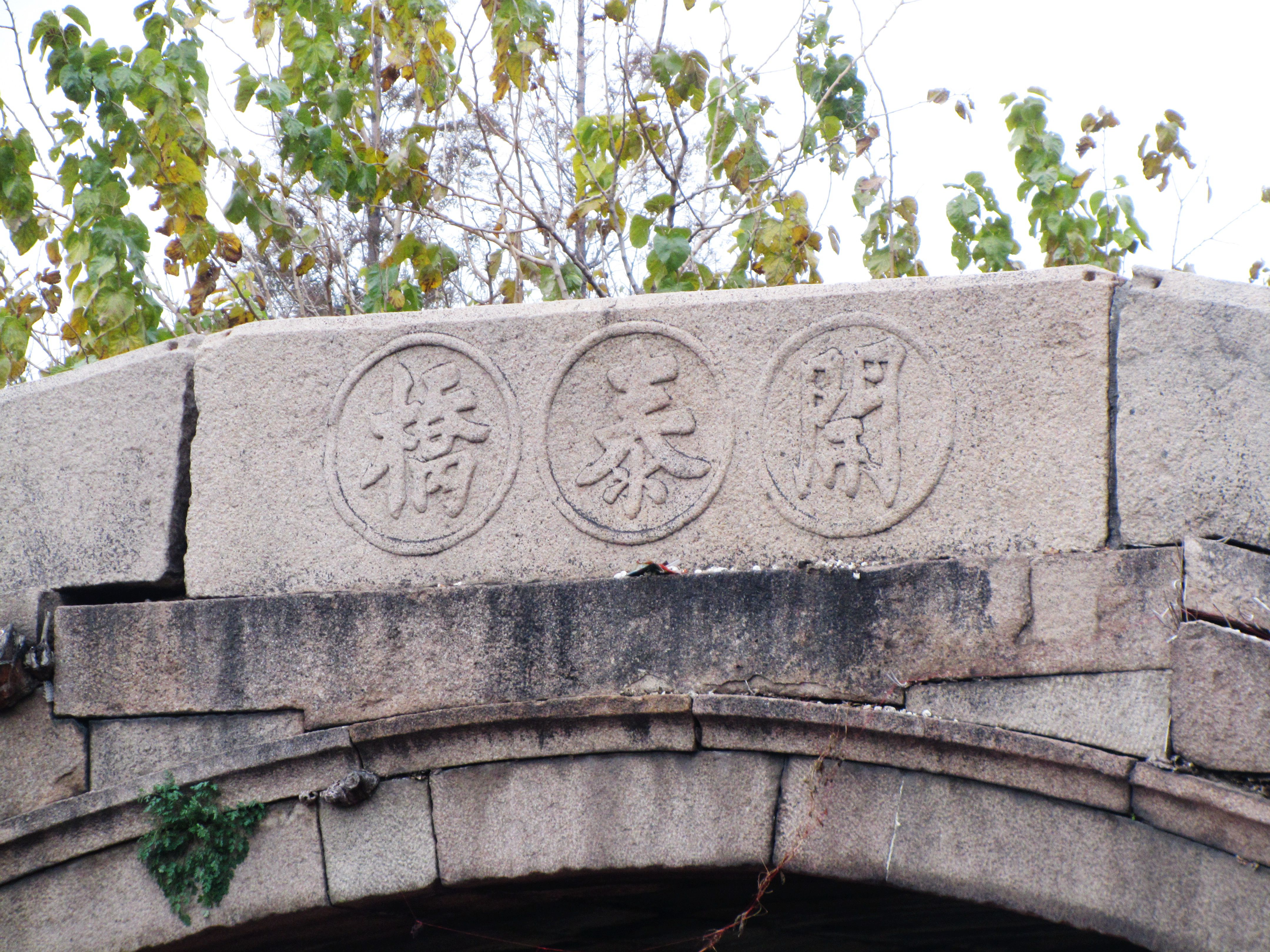
Inscription of the bridge name
