= Chef =

Trained professional cook

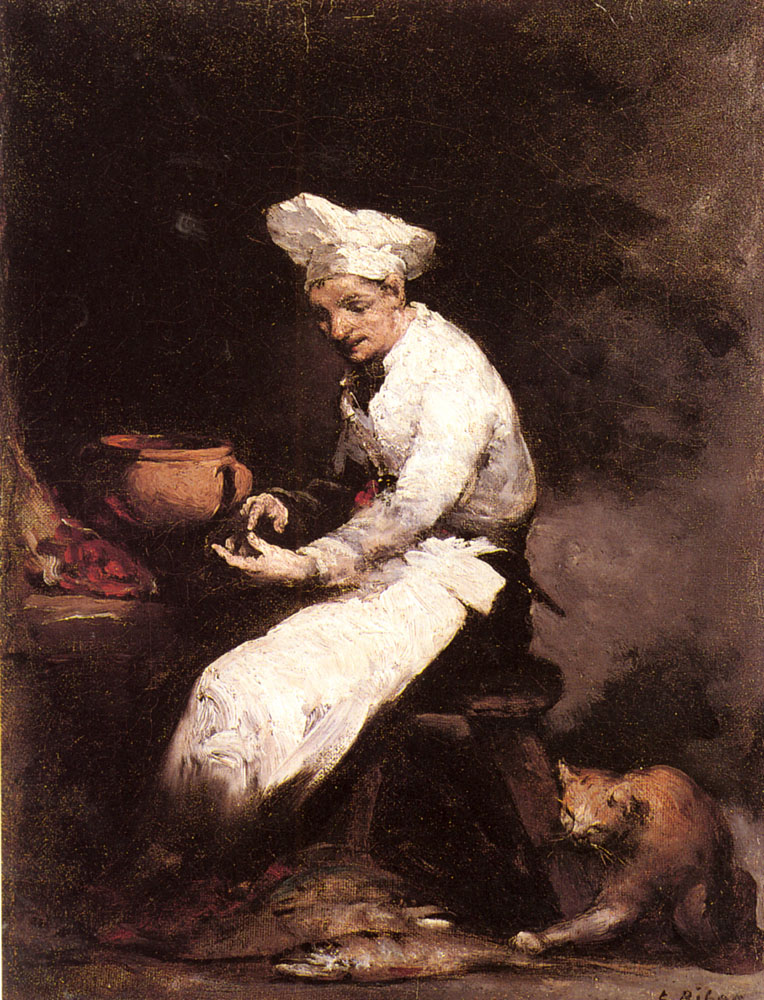
- French chef painted by Théodule Ribot (1823–1891)

Occupation
- Occupation type: Vocational
- Activity sectors: Food; Hospitality

Description
- Education required: Cooking school; Apprenticeship
- Related jobs: Baker

A chef is a professional cook and tradesperson who is proficient in many aspects of food preparation, often focusing on a particular cuisine. The word "chef" is derived from the term chef de cuisine (French pronunciation: [ʃɛf də kɥizin]), the director or head of a kitchen. Chefs can receive formal training from an institution, as well as by apprenticing with an experienced chef.

In modern kitchens, chefs often manage both culinary creativity and business operations, including budgeting, inventory systems, and team training.

Different terms use the word chef in their titles and deal with specific areas of food preparation. Examples include the sous-chef, who acts as the second-in-command in a kitchen, and the chef de partie, who handles a specific area of production. The kitchen brigade system is a hierarchy found in restaurants and hotels employing extensive staff, many of which use the word "chef" in their titles. Underneath the chefs are the kitchen assistants. A chef's standard uniform includes a hat (called a toque), neckerchief, double-breasted jacket, apron and sturdy shoes (that may include steel or plastic toe-caps).

== Etymology ==
The word "chef" is derived (and shortened) from the term chef de cuisine (French pronunciation: [ʃɛf.də.kɥi.zin]), the director or head of a kitchen. (The French word comes from Latin caput (head) and is cognate with English "chief"). In English, the title chef in the culinary arts originated in the haute cuisine of the 19th century. The culinary arts, among other aspects of the French language, introduced French loan words into the English language. The word is often used by itself as an honorific to address chefs by each other, apprentices, and waiting staff.

== Titles ==
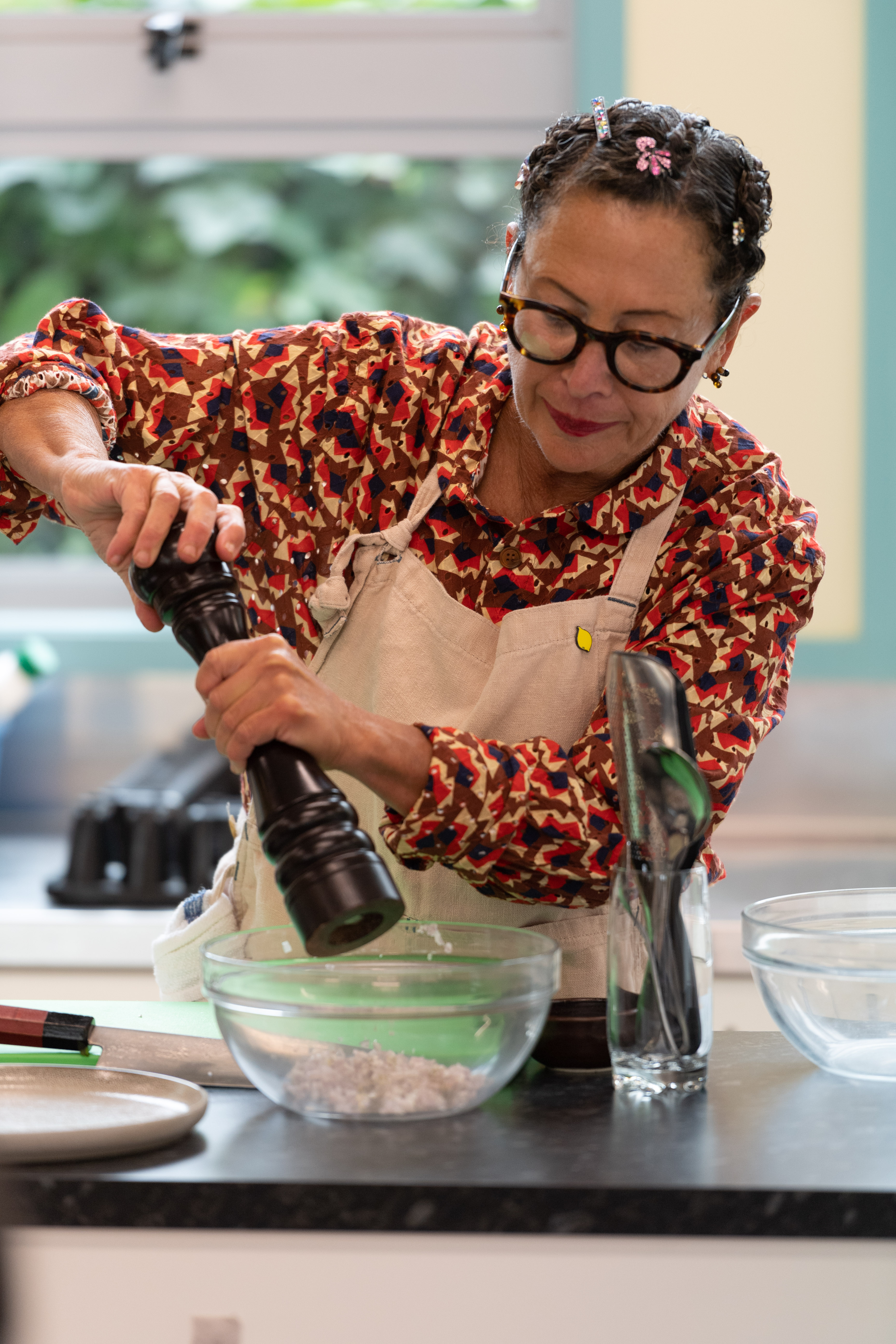
Nancy Silverton, a chef and baker known for her expertise in bread-making and pastry

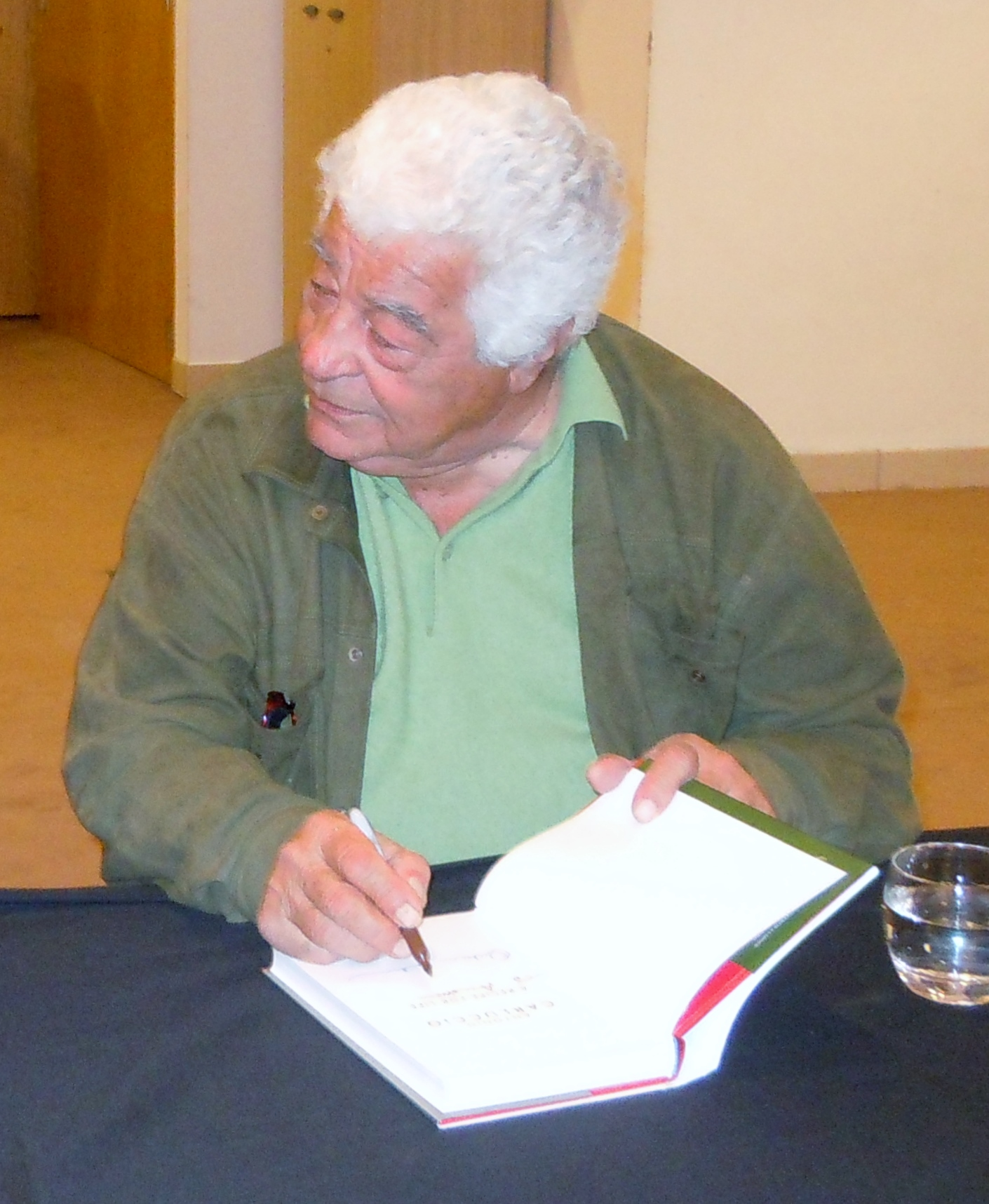
Antonio Carluccio was known as the father of Italian gastronomy

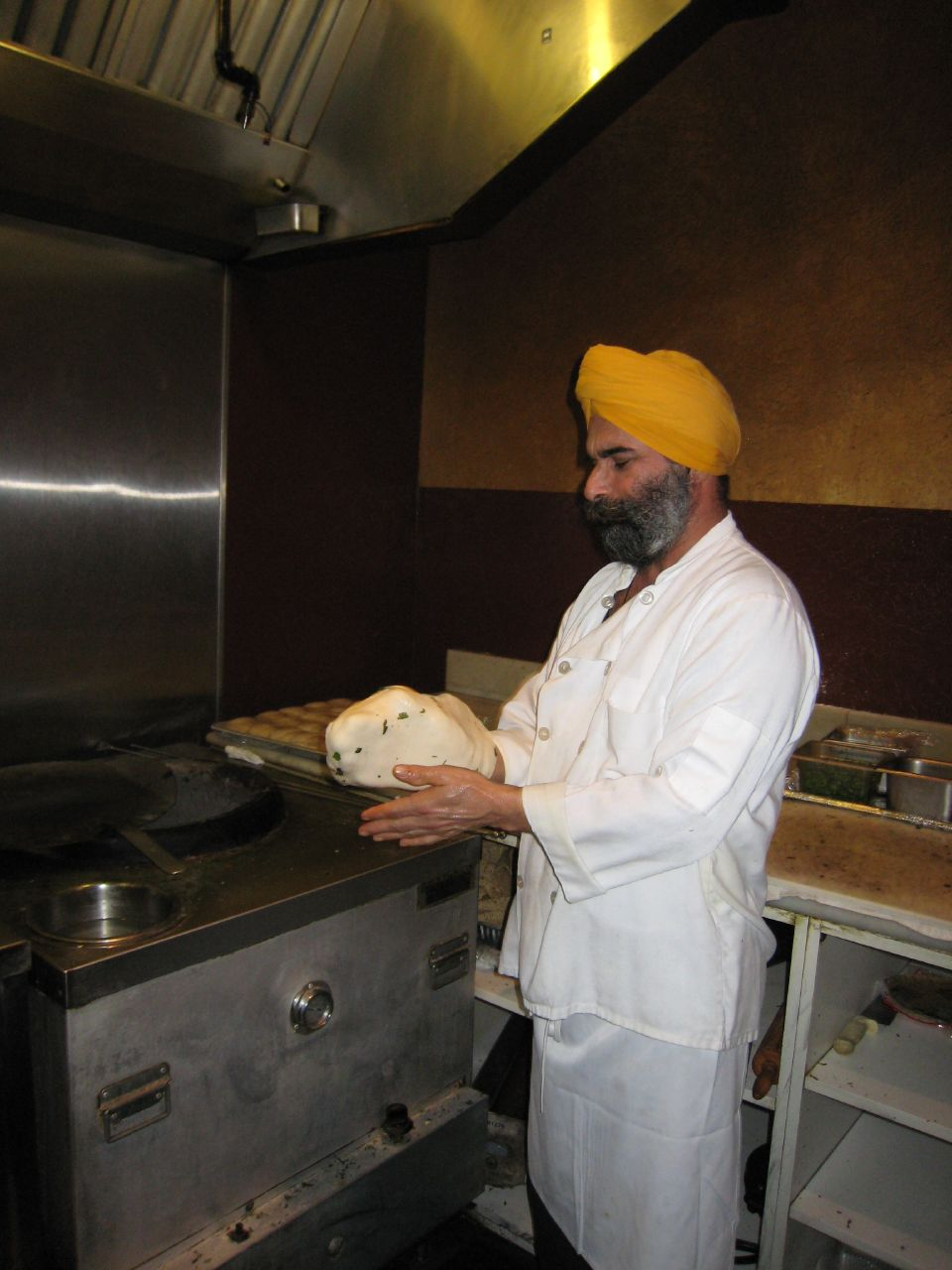
Chef preparing naan to be cooked in a tandoor

Various titles, detailed below, are given to those working in a professional kitchen and each can be considered a title for a type of chef. Many of the titles are based on the brigade de cuisine (or brigade system) documented by Auguste Escoffier, while others have a more general meaning depending on the individual kitchen.

=== Chef de cuisine ===
Other names include executive chef, chef manager, head chef, and master chef. This person is in charge of all activities related to the kitchen, which usually includes menu creation, management of kitchen staff, ordering and purchasing of inventory, controlling raw material costs and plating design. Chef de cuisine is the traditional French term from which the English word chef is derived. Head chef is often used to designate someone with the same duties as an executive chef, but there is usually someone in charge of a head chef, possibly making the larger executive decisions such as the direction of menu, the final authority in staff management decisions, and so on. This is often the case for executive chefs with multiple restaurants. Involved in checking the sensory evaluation of dishes after preparation and they are well aware of each sensory property of those specific dishes.

In the UK, the title executive chef normally applies to hotels with multiple outlets in the same hotel. Other establishments in the UK tend to use the title head chef.

=== Sous-chef ===
The sous-chef de cuisine (under-chef of the kitchen) is the second-in-command and direct assistant of the chef de cuisine or head chef. This person may be responsible for scheduling the kitchen staff or substituting when the head chef is absent. Also, the sous-chef will fill in for or assist a chef de partie (line cook) when needed. This person is accountable for the kitchen's inventory, cleanliness, organization, and the continuing training of its entire staff. A sous-chef's duties can also include carrying out the head chef's directives, conducting line checks, and overseeing the timely rotation of all food products. Smaller operations may not have a sous-chef, while larger operations may have more than one.

=== Chef de partie ===
A chef de partie, also known as a "station chef" or "line cook", is in charge of a particular area of production. In large kitchens, each chef de partie might have several cooks or assistants. In most kitchens, however, the chef de partie is the only worker in that department. Line cooks are often divided into a hierarchy of their own, starting with "first cook", then "second cook", and so on as needed.

=== Commis (chef)/Range chef ===
A commis chef is a junior chef in a professional kitchen who assists with the duties and operations of a specific station while learning the role. In larger kitchen brigades, commis chefs may be supervised by a demi chef de partie, while in smaller brigades they may report directly to a chef de partie. This may be a chef who has recently completed formal culinary training or is still undergoing training.

=== Brigade system titles ===
Station-chef titles, created by Escoffier, which are part of the brigade system include:

English	French	IPA	Responsibilities
Sauté chef	saucier	[sosje]	Sautéed items and their sauce. (The highest position of the stations.)
Fish chef	poissonnier	[pwasɔnje]	Fish dishes, and often fish butchering, and their sauces. (May be combined with the saucier position.)
Roast chef	rôtisseur	[ʁotisœʁ]	Roasted and braised meats, and their sauces.
Grill chef	grillardin	[ɡʁijaʁdɛ̃]	Grilled foods. (May be combined with the rotisseur.)
Fry chef	friturier	[fʁityʁje]	Fried items. (May be combined with the rotisseur.)
Entrée preparer	entremétier	[ɑ̃tʁəmetje]	Hot appetizers and often the soups, vegetables, pastas and starches.
Soup chef	potager	[pɔtaʒe]	Soups. (May be handled by the entremétier.)
Vegetable chef	légumier	[legymje]	Vegetables. (May be handled by the entremétier.)
Roundsman	tournant	[tuʁnɑ̃]	Fills in as needed on stations in the kitchen, a.k.a. the swing cook.
Pantry chef	garde manger	[ɡaʁd mɑ̃ʒe]	Cold foods: salads, cold appetizers, pâtés and other charcuterie items.
Butcher	boucher	[buʃe]	Butchers meats, poultry, and sometimes fish and breading.
Pastry chef	pâtissier	[patisje]	Baked goods and plated desserts, including pastries, cakes, and breads. May manage a separate team and department.

== Kitchen assistant ==
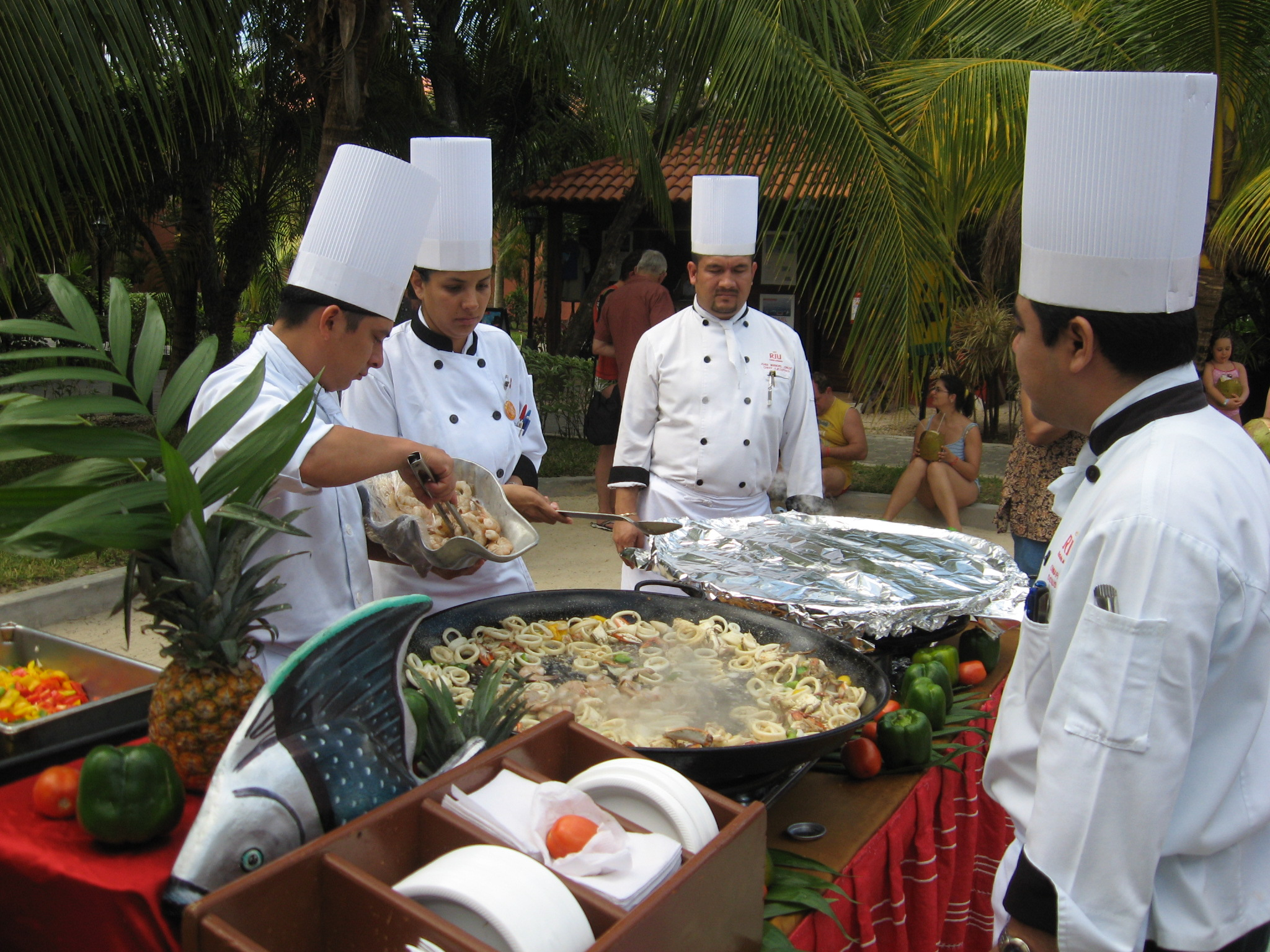
In Playa del Carmen Mexico, chefs don their standard uniforms while crafting seafood paella.

Kitchen assistants are of two types, kitchen-hands and stewards/kitchen porters. Kitchen-hands assist with basic food preparation tasks under the chef's direction. They carry out relatively unskilled tasks such as peeling potatoes and washing salad. Stewards/kitchen porters are involved in the scullery, washing up and general cleaning duties. In a smaller kitchen, these duties may be incorporated.

A communard is in charge of preparing the meal for the staff during a shift. This meal is often referred to as the staff or family meal.

The escuelerie (from 15th century French and a cognate of the English "scullery"), or the more modern plongeur or dishwasher, is the keeper of dishes, having charge of dishes and keeping the kitchen clean. A common humorous title for this role in some modern kitchens is "chef de plonge" or "head dishwasher".

== Culinary education ==
Education is available from many culinary institutions offering diploma, associate, and bachelor's degree programs in culinary arts. Depending on the level of education, this can take one to five years. An internship is often part of the curriculum. Regardless of the education received, most professional kitchens follow the apprenticeship system, and most new cooks will start at a lower-level 2nd or 1st cook position and work their way up.

Like many skilled trades, chefs usually go through a formal apprenticeship which includes many years of on-the-job training. Culinary schools and restaurants offer these apprenticeships. Apprenticeships usually take 3 to 4 years to complete and combine classroom instruction with on-the-job training. The training period for a chef is generally four years as an apprentice. A newly qualified chef is advanced or more commonly a toquecommis-chef, consisting of first-year commis, second-year commis, and so on. The rate of pay is usually in accordance with the chefs. Like all other chefs except the executive-chef, trainees are placed in sections of the kitchen (e.g., the starter (appetizer) or entrée sections) under the guidance of a demi-chef de partie and are given relatively basic tasks. Ideally, over time, a commis will spend a certain period in each section of the kitchen to learn the basics. Unaided, a commis may work on the vegetable station of a kitchen.

The usual formal training period for a chef is two to five years in catering college. They often spend the summer in work placements. In some cases this is modified to 'day-release' courses; a chef will work full-time in a kitchen as an apprentice and then would have allocated days off to attend catering college. These courses can last between one and three years. In the UK, most chefs are trained in the workplace, with most doing a formal NVQ level 2 or 3 in the workplace.

Chefs in training at chef school in Oxford, England

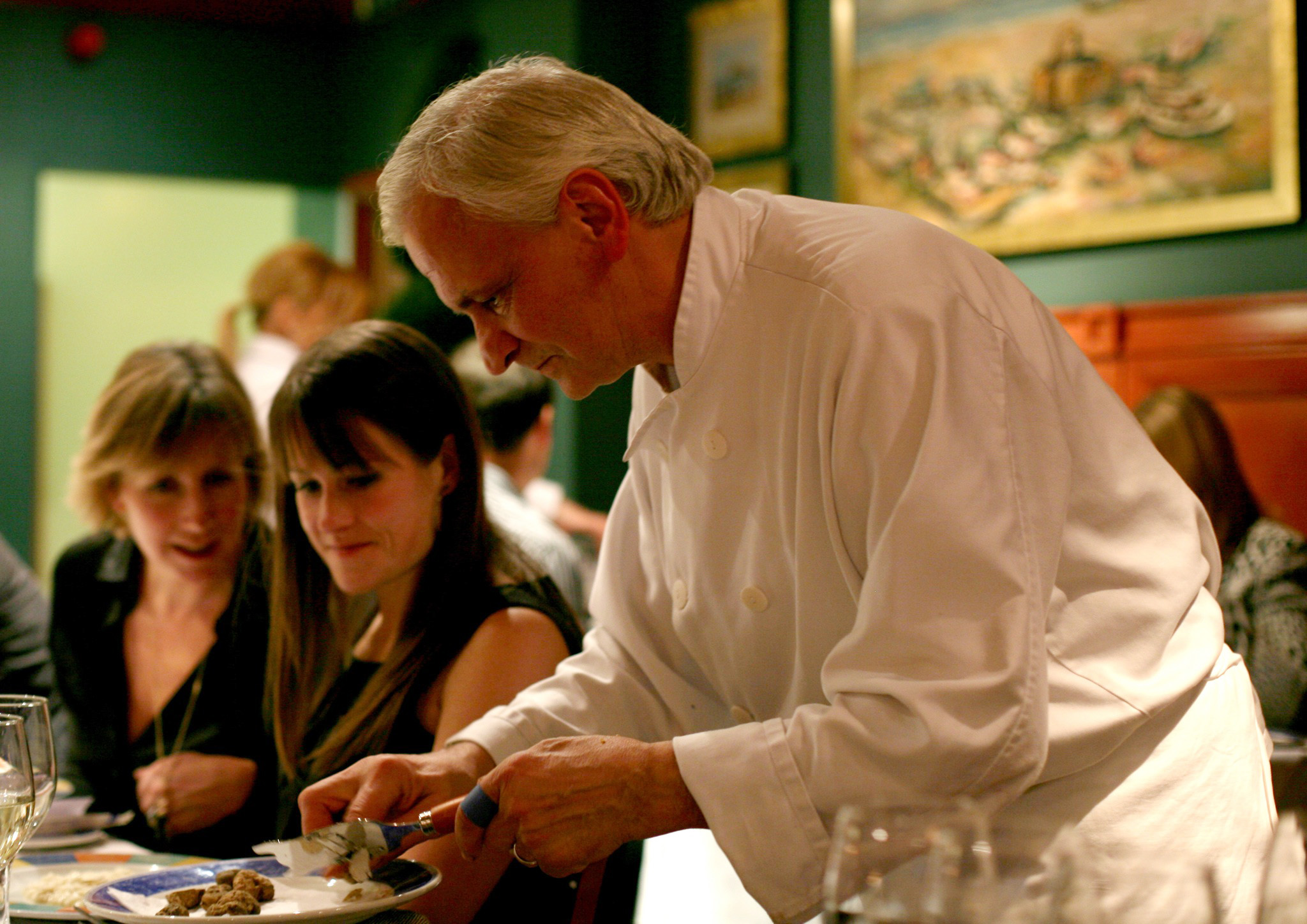
A chef preparing a truffle for diners

== See also ==
- American Culinary Federation
- Auguste Escoffier
- Brigade de cuisine
- Celebrity chef
- Chef (2014 film)
- Cook (profession)
- Culinary art
- Development chef
- List of chefs
- List of pastry chefs
- List of restaurant terminology
- Personal chef
- World Association of Chefs Societies
