= Danyang, Jiangsu =

Danyang 丹阳市 Tanyang
- County-level city
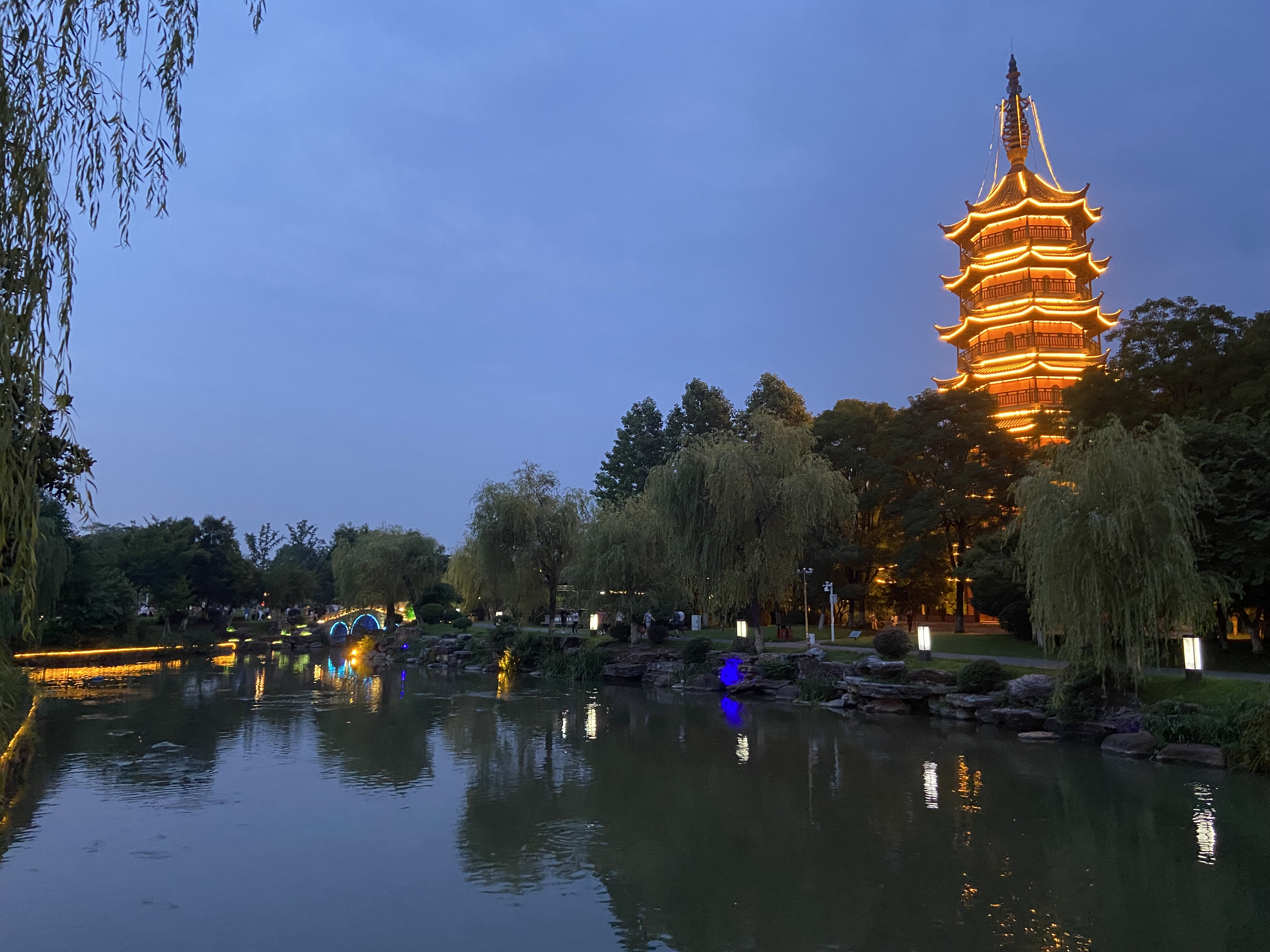
- Wanshan Pagoda

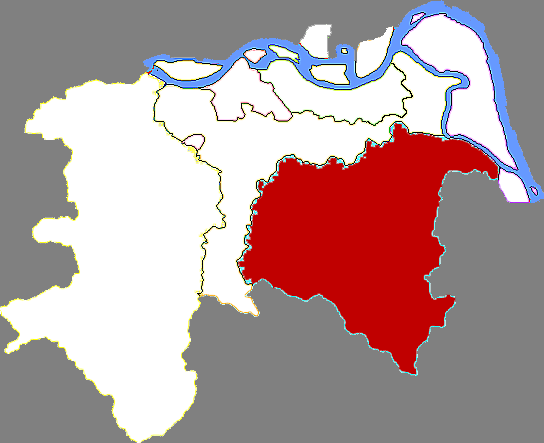
- Danyang in Zhenjiang

- Location in Jiangsu
- Coordinates: 32°00′00″N 119°35′10″E
- Country: People's Republic of China
- Province: Jiangsu
- Prefecture-level city: Zhenjiang

Area
  - County-level city: 1,047 km^{2} (404 sq mi)

Population (2020 census)
  - County-level city: 988,900
  - Density: 944.5/km^{2} (2,446/sq mi)
  - Urban: 792,584
  - Rural: 196,316
- Time zone: UTC+8 (China Standard)
- Postal code: 212300

Danyang (simplified Chinese: 丹阳; traditional Chinese: 丹陽; pinyin: Dānyáng) is a county-level city located on the southwest (right) bank of the Yangtze River, and is under the administration of Zhenjiang, Jiangsu province, China. It is noted for the production of optical lenses used in sunglasses and eyeglasses. Danyang has a total area of 1,059 km^{2} (409 sq mi) and a population of roughly 988,900 in 2020. Danyang locals speak a dialect of Wu Chinese, and the city is on the linguistic borderline between Wu Chinese and Jianghuai Mandarin.

== History ==
During the period of the Eastern Jin and four Southern Dynasties (Nan Chao) from 420 to 589 A.D. when China's national capital was in Jiankang (modern Nanjing), Danyang was the hometown of the emperors of the Southern Qi (479-502) and Liang Dynasties (502-557), who were buried in the countryside outside the city. Today 11 of these Southern Dynasties imperial tombs can still be found to the east and northeast of the city. They are notable for their unique stone statues of mythical animals marking the sacred way (圣道, sheng dao) leading to each imperial tomb.

== Administrative divisions ==
At present, Danyang City has 13 towns and 1 other under its jurisdiction.

13 towns

- Lingkou (陵口镇)
- Erling (珥陵镇)
- Fangxian (访仙镇)
- Situ (司徒镇)
- Yanling (延陵镇)
- Picheng (埤城镇)
- Xinqiao (新桥镇)
- Jiepai (界牌镇)
- Houxiang (后巷镇)
- Lücheng (吕城镇)
- Daoshu (导墅镇)
- Yunyang (云阳镇)
- Huangtang (皇塘镇)

1 Other

- Danyang Economic and Technological Development Zone (丹阳经济技术开发区)

== Climate ==
Climate data for Danyang, elevation 7 m (23 ft), (1991–2020 normals, extremes 1981–present)
Month	Jan	Feb	Mar	Apr	May	Jun	Jul	Aug	Sep	Oct	Nov	Dec	Year
Record high °C (°F)	20.9 (69.6)	26.0 (78.8)	33.1 (91.6)	33.8 (92.8)	35.8 (96.4)	37.2 (99.0)	38.6 (101.5)	41.1 (106.0)	37.2 (99.0)	32.6 (90.7)	28.0 (82.4)	22.3 (72.1)	41.1 (106.0)
Mean daily maximum °C (°F)	7.3 (45.1)	9.8 (49.6)	14.6 (58.3)	20.9 (69.6)	26.2 (79.2)	29.1 (84.4)	32.2 (90.0)	31.7 (89.1)	27.8 (82.0)	22.7 (72.9)	16.6 (61.9)	10.0 (50.0)	20.7 (69.3)
Daily mean °C (°F)	3.3 (37.9)	5.4 (41.7)	9.8 (49.6)	15.6 (60.1)	21.0 (69.8)	24.8 (76.6)	28.3 (82.9)	27.8 (82.0)	23.6 (74.5)	18.1 (64.6)	11.9 (53.4)	5.6 (42.1)	16.3 (61.3)
Mean daily minimum °C (°F)	0.4 (32.7)	2.1 (35.8)	5.9 (42.6)	11.1 (52.0)	16.7 (62.1)	21.3 (70.3)	25.1 (77.2)	24.8 (76.6)	20.4 (68.7)	14.5 (58.1)	8.3 (46.9)	2.3 (36.1)	12.7 (54.9)
Record low °C (°F)	−9.2 (15.4)	−9.8 (14.4)	−4.7 (23.5)	−0.2 (31.6)	6.9 (44.4)	11.3 (52.3)	18.6 (65.5)	17.5 (63.5)	8.8 (47.8)	2.3 (36.1)	−3.3 (26.1)	−12.6 (9.3)	−12.6 (9.3)
Average precipitation mm (inches)	56.7 (2.23)	54.7 (2.15)	80.6 (3.17)	77.7 (3.06)	88.9 (3.50)	201.1 (7.92)	205.6 (8.09)	147.1 (5.79)	87.7 (3.45)	56.5 (2.22)	51.9 (2.04)	36.9 (1.45)	1,145.4 (45.07)
Average precipitation days (≥ 0.1 mm)	9.5	9.2	10.7	9.7	10.4	11.3	12.5	11.8	7.9	7.6	8.0	7.4	116
Average snowy days	3.3	2.5	0.9	0	0	0	0	0	0	0	0.3	1.2	8.2
Average relative humidity (%)	73	73	72	71	72	77	80	80	77	73	74	72	75
Mean monthly sunshine hours	118.2	118.7	141.8	168.1	175.3	129.2	172.6	177.0	157.7	159.9	138.6	132.5	1,789.6
Percentage possible sunshine	37	38	38	43	41	30	40	43	43	46	44	43	41
Source: China Meteorological Administration all-time extreme temperature All-time September high all-time January high

== Economy ==
As one of the key cities in the Yangtze River Delta open to foreign trade, Danyang has shown strong economic and standard-of-living growth since 2000. In 2007, the GDP and per capita GDP of Danyang reached 35.7 billion yuan (US$4.7 billion) and 44,242 yuan (US$6,061) respectively. Danyang's economy was 16th in a 2010 ranking of China's top county-level cities.

As a developing city within the Shanghai economic sphere of influence, Danyang has attracted domestic and foreign businesses. Representatives of 32 countries and regions invested in Danyang with accumulated paid-in capital of US$1 billion. The main industries in Danyang are prescription eyewear, lamps and lanterns, tools and hardware — in particular drill bits — and automobile parts.

=== Spectacles City ===
During the 1960s, factories producing eyeglasses were established in Danyang. By 1986, the local government designated two dedicated glasses wholesale markets to concentrate glasses production. The following year, local glasses production reached 6.5 million pairs of glasses annually. As of 2026, three quarters of China's prescription lens production and half of the world production is based in Danyang. The Spectacles City, located in Danyang, is one of the largest eyeglass merchandise centers in China. Starting in 1986, the market center's was built in three phases. It subsequently merged with the Huayang Spectacles and Yunyang Spectacles markets. It covers an area of over 344,445 square feet (32,000 square meters). The mall attracts over 10,000 visitors per weekend.

== Education ==
=== Schools ===
- Jiangsu Danyang Senior High School

== Transport ==
- China National Highway 312

=== Railway stations ===
There are three railway stations in Danyang:

- Danyang Railway Station, actually two separate, adjacent, but unconnected stations. The old station is served by regular trains on the Huning Railway. The new station is served by high-speed trains on the Huning Intercity High-Speed Railway (between Nanjing and Shanghai).
- Danyang North Railway Station, north of the city, is served by high-speed trains on the Jinghu High-Speed Railway (between Shanghai and Beijing). Danyang North station is at the beginning of the Danyang–Kunshan Grand Bridge, currently the longest bridge in the world.

The high-speed trains (typically, listed in schedules as G-series or D-series trains) take about an hour and a half to get to Shanghai and about 30 minutes to get to Nanjing, the provincial capital. Direct service to Beijing from Danyang North Station takes about 4 hours and 30 minutes.

== Local food ==
Danyang is known for its barley gruel and huangjiu (yellow wine), which has traditional medicinal properties.

== Tourist attractions ==
- Jizi Temple, famous its scenic spots and historical sites, as well as the Boiling Wells.
- Kaitai Bridge is a historic stone arch bridge in the city, which was built during the Wanli era.
