= Barley gruel =

Type of gruel common in China

- Type: Porridge
- Place of origin: China
- Region or state: Danyang, Jiangsu
- Main ingredients: Barley, rice and alkali

Barley gruel (simplified Chinese: 大麦粥; traditional Chinese: 大麥粥; pinyin: dàmàizhōu) or Danyang barley porridge is a type of porridge found in Danyang, Jiangsu. It is made from barley, rice and alkali.

== History ==
According to local legend, when the Qianlong Emperor came to Danyang, officials could not take expensive and delicate food. Worried, the officials presented barley gruel to the emperor. The emperor was happy with the food and enjoyed the taste. Since that time, the people of Danyang eat barley gruel for their breakfast and supper.

== Cooking process ==
Prepare some barley flour which is mixed with water and some dietary alkali which is used to enhance the flavor of the gruel. As soon as the porridge starts boiling, turn down the flame and then pour the mixed barley paste into the porridge. After that, add a spoonful of dietary alkali to it and at the same time, stir the porridge. When the porridge boils again and it becomes yellow, it can be eaten.

== Traditional Chinese medicine ==
Barley porridge has two uses in Chinese medicine: strengthening the spleen and stomach and relieving sunstroke.

== See also ==
- List of porridges
