= Daoshu, Jiangsu =

Daoshu 导墅镇
- Town
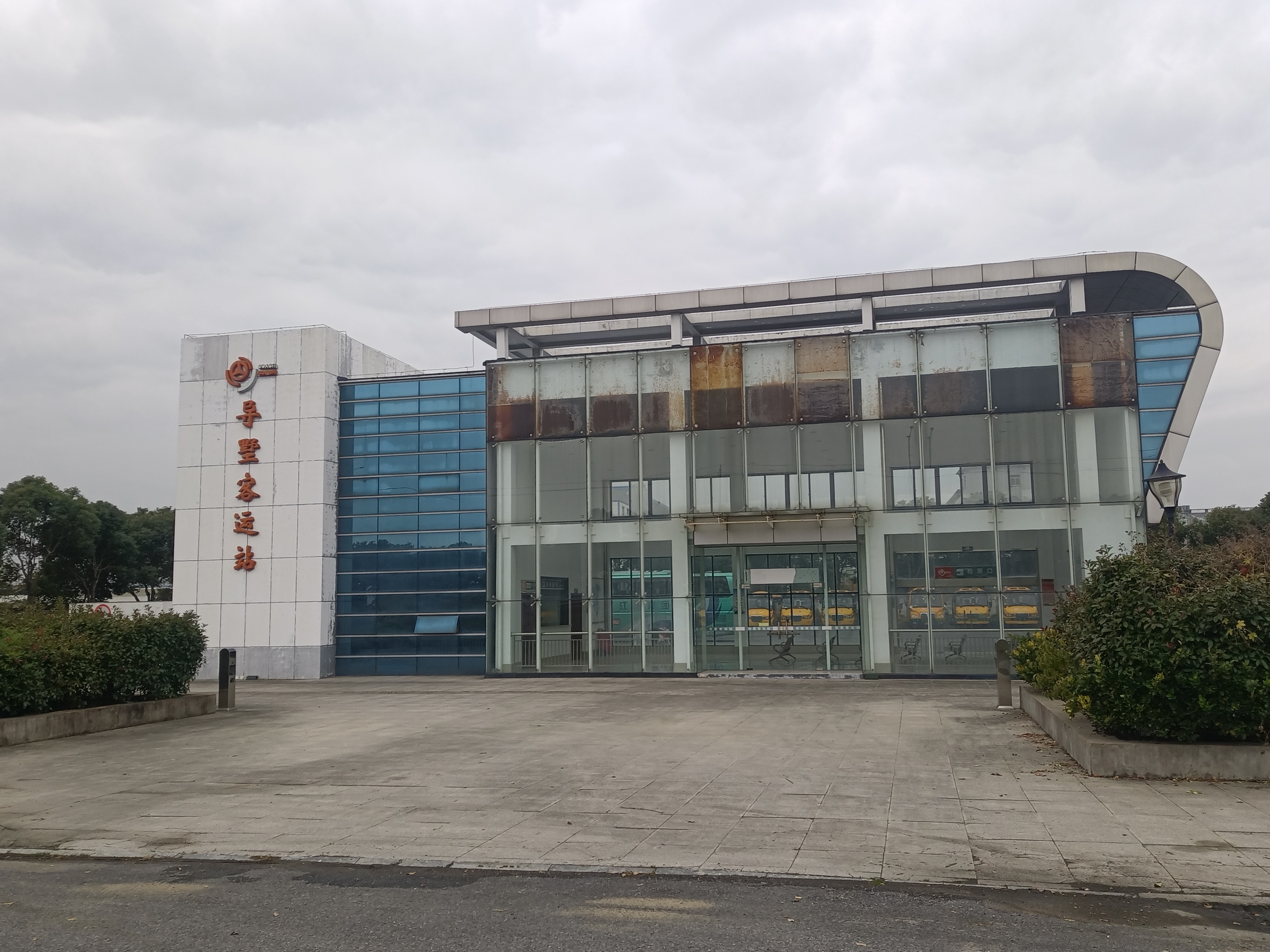

- Location in Jiangsu
- Coordinates: 31°50′19″N 119°41′14″E
- Country: People's Republic of China
- Province: Jiangsu
- Prefecture-level city: Zhenjiang
- County-level city: Danyang
- Time zone: UTC+8 (China Standard)

Daoshu (simplified Chinese: 导墅; traditional Chinese: 導墅; pinyin: Dǎoshù) is a town under the administration of Danyang, Jiangsu, China. As of 2023, it administers Lizhuang Residential Community (里庄社区) the following eleven villages:

- Daoshu Village
- Dongxin Village (东新村)
- Donghe Village (东河村)
- Lizhuang Village (里庄村)
- Baima Village (白马村)
- Zhendong Village (镇东村)
- Paqiao Village (葩桥村)
- Xiaohua Village (小华村)
- Dahua Village (大华村)
- Houzhuang Village (后庄村)
- Xiaqin Village (下琴村)
