= Cook (profession) =

Occupation involving cooking food

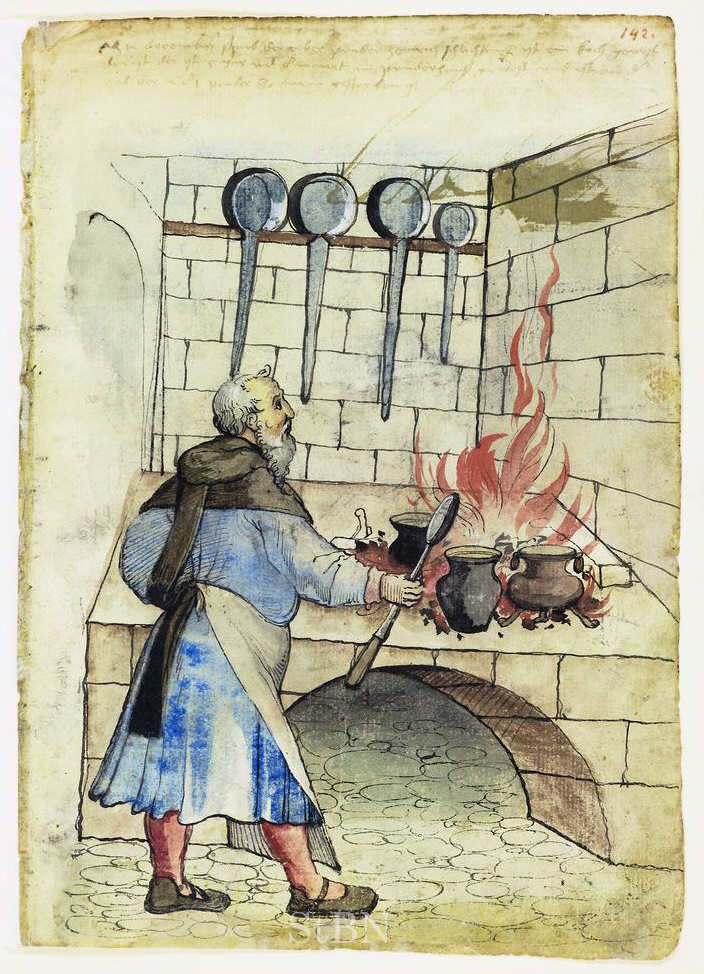
A cook at work (15th- or 16th-century German illustration)

A cook is a professional individual who prepares items for consumption in the food industry, especially in settings such as restaurants. A cook is sometimes referred to as a chef, although in the culinary world, the terms are not interchangeable. Cooks' responsibilities include preparing food, managing food stations, cleaning the kitchen, and helping the chefs. Restaurants will give a title to the cooks according to their designated stations. Examples are broiler cooks, fry cooks, pantry cooks, and sauce cooks.

== History ==
In 776 BC, Coroebus of Elis, who won the Ancient Olympic Games in a sprint race, was also a cook.

In the Middle Age of Northern France (around 9th–15th century), being a cook was a known profession in the community. In a sense, cooks were acknowledged as trained craftsmen. Taillevent wrote in the Le Viandier—a classic recipe collection in medieval France—that he underwent different levels of training such as being an apprentice and journeyman before he acquired a master grade. The master or queu attained knowledge passed from one generation to another.

Georges Auguste Escoffier (1846–1935) described a cook in the brigade de cuisine as the Cuisinier. They help the top levels in the hierarchy, such as chefs, and prepare specific dishes.

=== Ming China ===
During the Ming dynasty (1368–1644), the profession of cook was one that served, on the most part, the upper echelons of society, serving the likes of merchants, officials and landlords. The development of the culinary world in China during the Ming dynasty, due to the new 'New World' crops, such as maize, potatoes, and chilis, created an environment which led to a new and quality foods being accessible to more and more people in Ming China. The new variety in foods on offer to cooks even led to various instruction manuals and recipe books on food preparation.

==== Cook employment ====
The cooks that prepared and cooked the food for those of the Chinese population that were in the upper echelons of society and therefore could afford it, would operate through inns, restaurants and even by roaming the streets as a street vendor, thus offering customers a variety of options. However, despite the growing variety of foods and food sellers in Ming China, the services of most of the professional cooks was reserved for the elite class. The court was an extremely large employer of cooks throughout the entirety of the Ming dynasty, with over 9,000 cooks employed in the 15th century; the cooks in the employment of the court would be expected to provide for around 10,000 to 15,000 people on a daily basis, including providing them all with wine. Aside from just cooking food to be eaten, the court also employed around 1,800 cooks to prepare sacrifices and offerings for rituals, around 200,000 animals were sacrificed yearly, including vast amounts of geese, pigs, and sheep. Cooks would provide meals for merchants and landlords as well, but, they were not employed at the same high rate as the cooks employed by the court. The merchants and landlords who could afford the luxury of personally cooked food by a professional chef could usually expect a great quality and even extremely skill-heavy and laborious types of cooking, for example baking and sugar animals. This exclusivity of cooks for the rich associated the profession and its work with the greed and gluttony of the elite classes, so, often private food preparation with cooks would be connected with evil or villainy.

==== Status of cooks ====
The cooks in Ming China, as mentioned before, were only available to be utilised by the very wealthy. Despite the exclusive nature of the job and the status levels of those they prepared food for, the occupation of the cook during Ming times was not a highly coveted profession due to the amount of animal killing involved with being a cook. The negative karma associated with killing the sentient living beings, and then using this as a means of making a living, makes the profession of cook one that was described to be avoided. The nature of a cooks work and the religious values of Taoism and Buddhism clash heavily, reinforcing this idea of a cook being an undesirable occupation, furthermore, cooks were known to request the safe passage of their slaughtered animals to the Pure Land through Amitabha. Despite the various negative aspects associated with the cook profession in Ming China, there were still some positives for it, being a cook required a certain level of skill and to a certain extent it was artisanal, demanding fine tuning of skills and finesse, which in turn earned the profession of cook and other similar professions respect amongst their peers.

==== Recipe books ====
Cooks in Ming China could learn their trade through the multitude of recipe books and herbal guides that was published during the Ming dynasty. These books and guides were published as a way to promote individual health, and mostly dealt with the health benefits of foods and yangsheng (养生), meaning 'nourish life'. An example of one of these recipe books is titled the Old Glutton's Collection (Laotao ji; 老饕集), written by Zhang Dai. Zhang Dai not only provided recipes for guidance but also wrote about the connections between food and health as well as the relationship to class levels and food

== Salary and economic value ==
Based on the United States Bureau of Labor Statistics, the number of work opportunities for cooks is expected to go up by 6 percent during the time period of 2016 to 2026. In 2016, the number of jobs for a cook was at 2,403,000. The rate is projected to increase more slowly than food preparation workers, bakers, and chefs (all of which are projected to increase by at least 8 percent from 2016 to 2026).

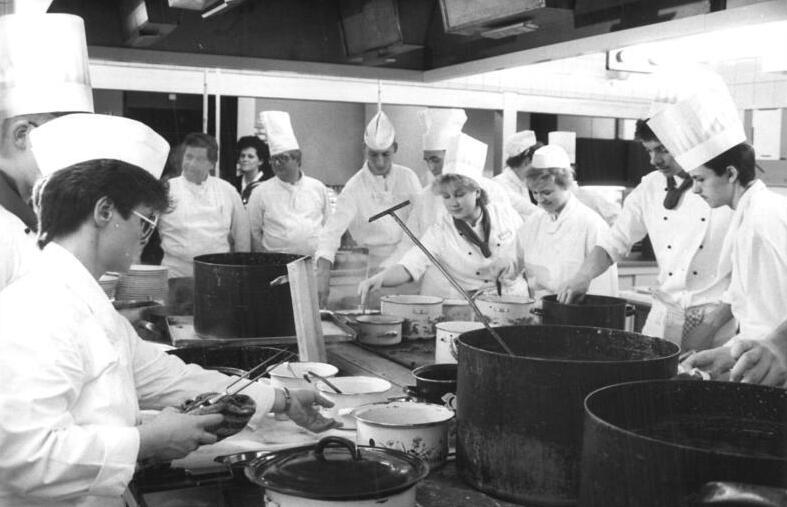
A group of professional and aspiring cooks in a hotel kitchen (1990)

In addition, cooks earn about $22,850 a year, which is about $10.99 an hour.

As of October 2017, the average income for cooks in Canada was around C$33,400 a year.

As of 2018, cooks in Australia earned about AU$20.48 for every hour of work.

== Education ==
=== United States ===
There is not a strict set of achievements that one must accomplish before one can become a cook.

There are institutions that provide culinary programs, such as vocational cooking schools. There are mandatory lessons that cover topics such as food safety, sanitation, hospitality, and advanced cooking. This will last for less than two years to four years.

It is also known that some cooks receive their education through culinary apprenticeships that can be sponsored by professional culinary institutes or trade unions. Apprenticeships usually have a duration of one year and provide on-the-job experience along with technical training.

Based on the American Culinary Federation, the minimum requirements for entering such programs include being 17 years old and having a high school diploma or equivalent. Should they seek out a promotion to higher level culinary professions, they may get a culinary certification that proves them to have at least two years of job experience and basic knowledge of kitchen skills.

=== United Kingdom ===
GCSE in English and Maths could help individuals who are interested in becoming cooks. However, it is more valuable if they experienced apprenticeship or training in any culinary institution or courses.

There are certain colleges from different areas that provide training and development programs. Among these are Wales, England, and Northern Ireland. Examples of certificate or diploma available are Diploma in Introduction to Professional Cookery, Certificate in General Cookery, and Diploma in Food Production and Cooking.

== Health concerns ==
There are various health concerns that arise from working in a kitchen. Cooks who deal with uncooked meat have the chance to catch food-borne illnesses. Additionally, cooks are at risk of breathing in and touching chemical products such as bleach and glass cleaner. Two other potential concerns are the risk of getting injured from the use of sharp objects, or from touching hot surfaces. Another possible health danger is that cooks could fall due to wet and slick floors. Cooking in commercial settings can also be physically and mentally stressful, often requiring fast and repetitive movements in hot, humid, loud, hazardous, and chaotic environments, as well as working odd hours, split shifts, and "clopens" (when a worker performs a closing shift one day and performs an opening shift the very next day). Due to the stress, cooks often use substances such as nicotine, alcohol, and other drugs to cope.

== Regional differences ==
=== Middle East ===
Professional cooks in the Middle East are predominantly men. Because of religious restrictions (except for a small amount of Christian-based groups), cooks typically refrain from using pork to make meals while lamb and chicken are the standard meats used. Then, the meat will be served with either bread or rice. According to Jill Eversole Nolan, there is a high percentage of Middle Easterners that are lactose intolerant which is why dairy is not frequently used when eating meals. Cattle are frequently used for carrying or moving items and are to only be used for food when there is no other purpose for them. Even then, beef is not easy to use as a food source and is served in chunks, either dried, raw, or cooked. On the other hand, eggplants are easy to buy off the streets and are highly used by Middle Eastern cooks with over 40 dishes prepared while just using the main ingredient.

=== Mexico ===
Mexican cooks make a strong point to respect the dishes they make and that these dishes reflect their "heritage" and "soul". The amount of passion they have directly ties into how well their food comes out and how flavorful it may be. Cooks will often haggle and buy their ingredients from street markets while their corn tortillas are either handmade (which is considerably time-consuming) or bought from tortillerias. Mexican cuisine has been influenced by French invaders and integrates both styles in their food. Crêpes, or crepas, as they are called in Mexico, were introduced to them by French invaders and are widely used for various dishes.

== See also ==
- Chef
- Chief cook
- Cook (domestic worker)
  - Domestic worker
- Cooking
- List of cooking techniques
- Personal chef
