= Personal chef =

Chef hired to cook in clients' homes

A personal chef is a chef who is hired by clients to prepare meals in the client's home kitchen, based on their needs and preferences.

== Description ==
A personal chef often meets with a client and customizes a multi-meal plan by determining how often the service will be provided and the number of meals cooked each time. The client will typically choose various meals, snacks, and sides from the chef's menu, or request specific dishes be prepared for them. The chef then shops for all needed ingredients, prepares the meal(s) on a designated "cook date" in the client's home, packages the meals for the refrigerator or freezer, cleans the kitchen, and leaves detailed reheating instructions. Some personal chefs also provide the same services for one-time events such as dinner parties or special events. Many personal chefs also offer personalized cooking lessons in the privacy of a client's home, either one-on-one or in groups.

According to health department guidelines, all food must either be prepared in the home of the client or in a licensed kitchen that has passed an official health inspection. A personal chef must be a licensed and insured business and maintain any food service certifications required by their local, state, or national jurisdiction.

A personal chef differs from a private chef, who is often but not necessarily employed exclusively by one client, and in some cases, may live in the client's home.

When hiring a personal chef to provide either a packaged meal service or to cook for a dinner party, there is usually a collaboration between the client and the chef to determine the menu, based on individual tastes and preferences as well as dietary restrictions. An estimate of costs is then provided by the chef. Some chefs charge a fee based on the number of meals and servings prepared each time, while others charge an hourly fee plus the cost of food. Typically, the chef is given approval, a deposit, or (if familiar with the guest/frequent client) an expense account for the menu. The number of personal chef businesses in North America rose from around 5,000 in 2007 to around 10,000 in 2017.

In terms of experience, personal chefs tend to be chefs who have worked in restaurants, hotels, catering, or all three, though many culinary students become personal chefs directly out of school. Some personal chefs do not have formal culinary training but are passionate home cooks, some with years of experience and knowledge feeding their families and friends. Potential clients can research personal chefs in their area via online membership registries, search engines, or a personal chef staffing agency.

The hiring of a private chef has been popular for some time but was traditionally reserved for the wealthy and therefore broadly inaccessible to most of the population. However, the rise of private chef companies worldwide has made the utilisation of a private chef more accessible and affordable, especially for customers renting self-catered vacation properties. It is also now seen in the UK and France as a genuine alternative to eating out.

== See also ==
- Cook (domestic worker)
- Cook (profession)
