= Huai'an East railway station =

Railway station in Huai'an, China

Huai'an East 淮安东
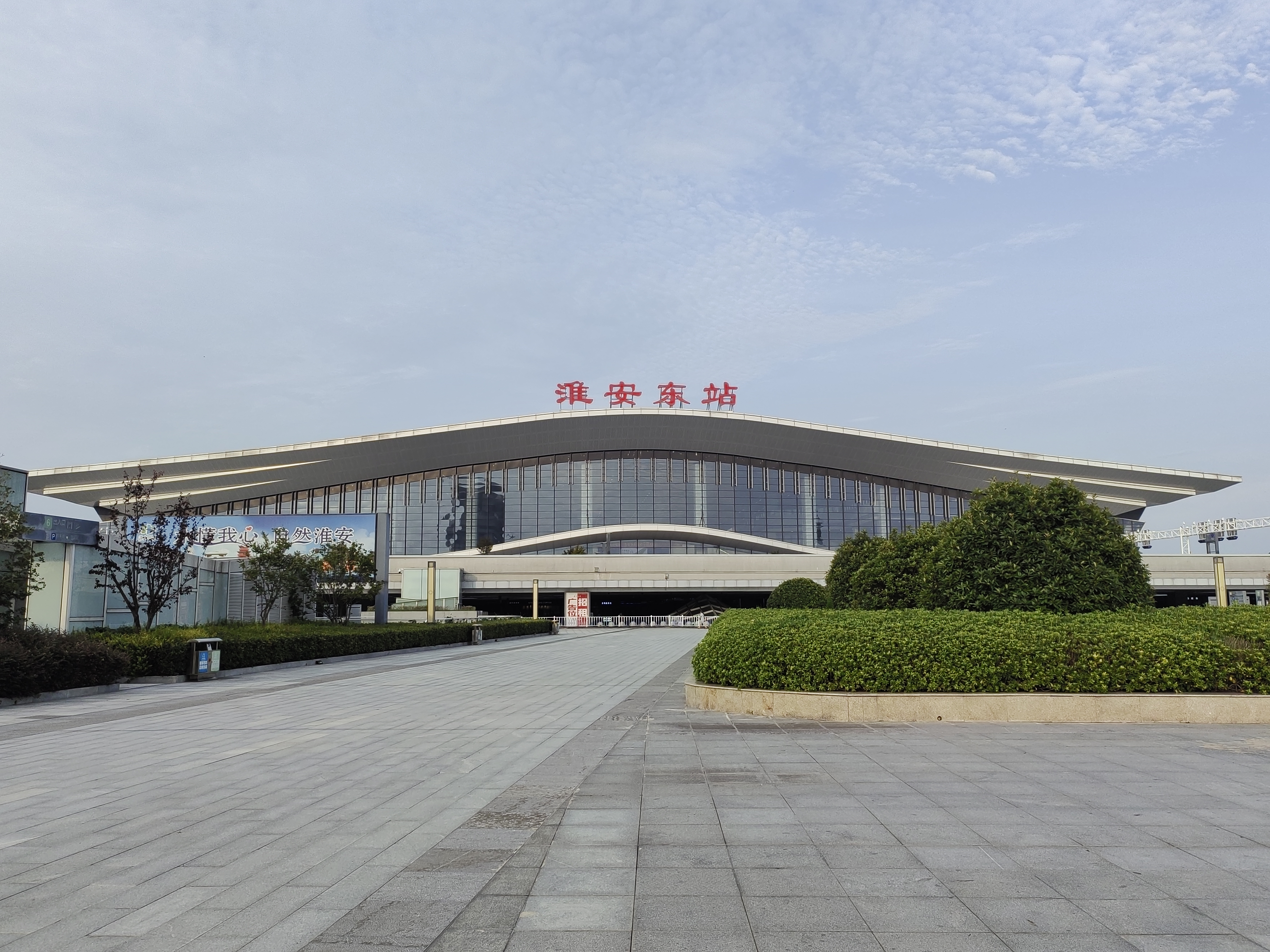

General information
- Location: Huai'an District, Huai'an, Jiangsu; China
- Operator: China Railway Corporation
- Lines: Lianyungang–Zhenjiang high-speed railway Xuzhou–Yancheng high-speed railway Nanjing–Huai'an intercity railway (under construction)

History
- Opened: December 16, 2019
Location

Huai'an East railway station is a railway station located in Huai'an, China. It is situated at an intersection between two lines: the Lianyungang–Zhenjiang high-speed railway and the Xuzhou–Yancheng high-speed railway.

It is the second station to serve Huai'an, the first being Huai'an railway station.

== History ==
The station opened on 16 December 2019.

Preceding station	China Railway High-speed	Following station
Siyang towards Xuzhou East	Xuzhou–Yancheng high-speed railway	Funing South towards Yancheng
Lianshui towards Lianyungang	Lianyungang–Zhenjiang high-speed railway	Baoying towards Zhenjiang or Dantu
