= Yangzhou East railway station =

Railway station in Yangzhou, Jiangsu

Yangzhou East 扬州东
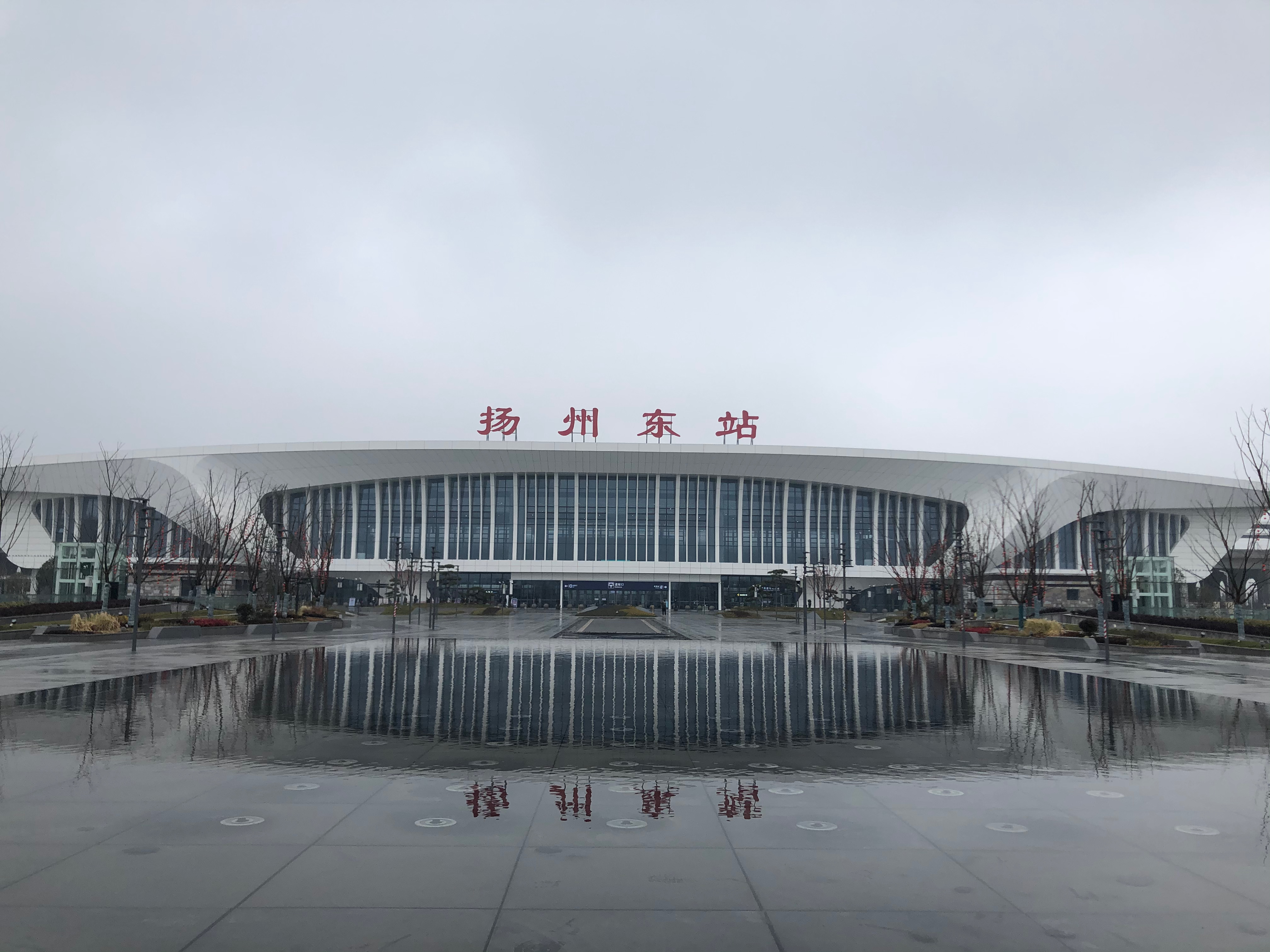

General information
- Location: Guangling District, Yangzhou, Jiangsu; China
- Coordinates: 32.407080°N 119.522674°E
- Line(s): Lianyungang–Zhenjiang high-speed railway
- Platforms: 4

History
- Opened: December 11, 2020

Yangzhou East railway station (Chinese: 扬州东站; pinyin: Yángzhōu Dōng zhàn) is a railway station in Guangling District, Yangzhou, Jiangsu, China. It opened with the remaining section of the Lianyungang–Zhenjiang high-speed railway on 11 December 2020.

There are four platforms, in the form of two islands, with an avoiding line in both directions. This is the largest railway station in Yangzhou.

== See also ==
Yangzhou is also served by Yangzhou railway station and Jiangdu railway station on the Nanjing–Qidong railway.

Preceding station	China Railway High-speed	Following station
Gaoyou towards Lianyungang	Lianyungang–Zhenjiang high-speed railway	Dagang South towards Zhenjiang or Dantu
