= Gaoyou North railway station =

Railway station in Yangzhou, Jiangsu

Gaoyou North 高邮北
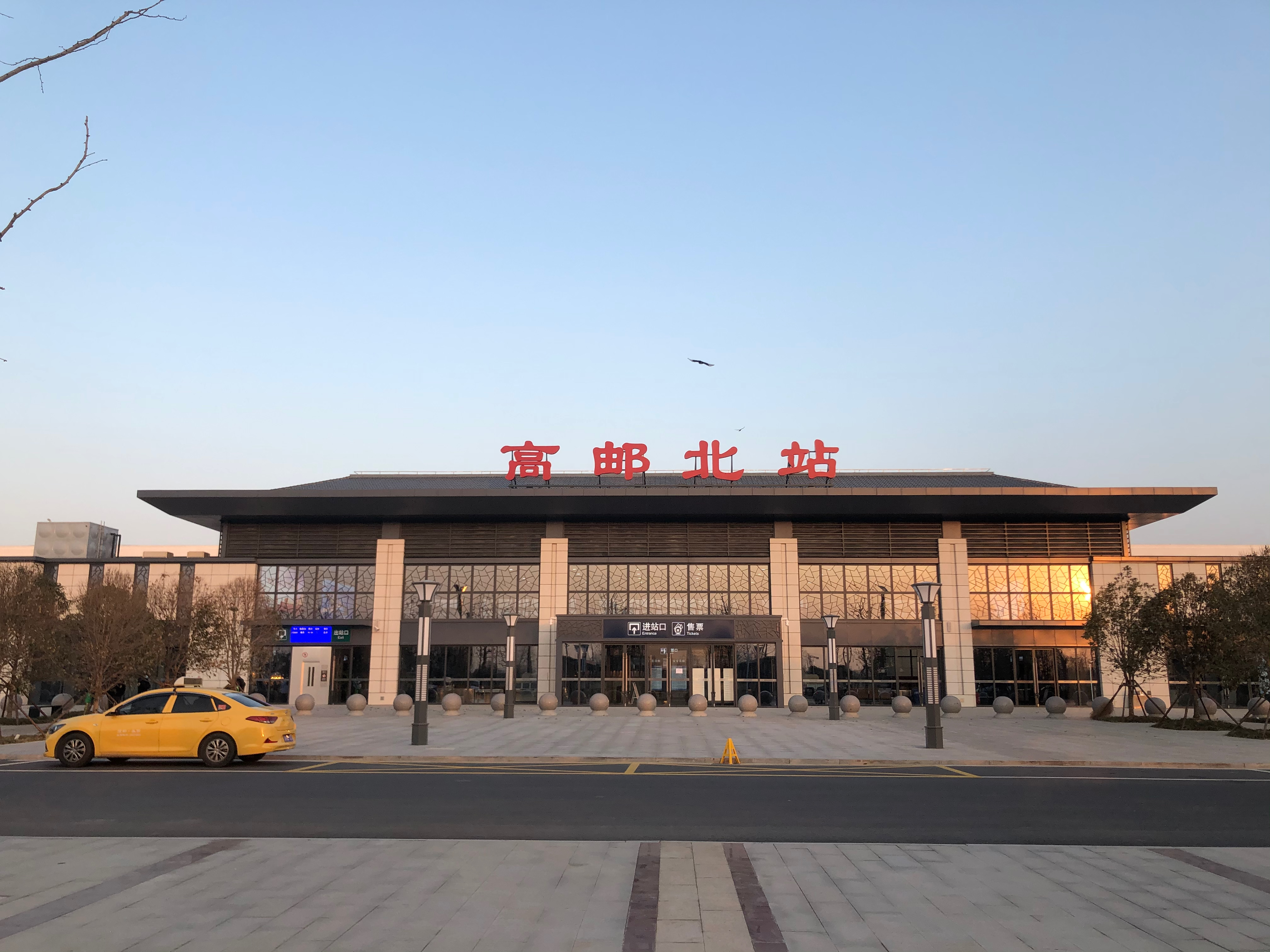

General information
- Location: Jieshou, Gaoyou, Yangzhou, Jiangsu; China
- Coordinates: 33.003520°N 119.450934°E
- Line(s): Lianyungang–Zhenjiang high-speed railway
- Platforms: 2

History
- Opened: December 11, 2020

Gaoyou North railway station (Chinese: 高邮北站) is a railway station in Jieshou, Gaoyou, Yangzhou, Jiangsu, China. It opened with the remaining section of the Lianyungang–Zhenjiang high-speed railway on 11 December 2020. During construction, this station was called Jieshou (界首).

Preceding station	China Railway High-speed	Following station
Baoying towards Lianyungang	Lianyungang–Zhenjiang high-speed railway	Gaoyou towards Zhenjiang or Dantu
