= Gaoyou railway station =

Railway station in Yangzhou, Jiangsu

Gaoyou 高邮
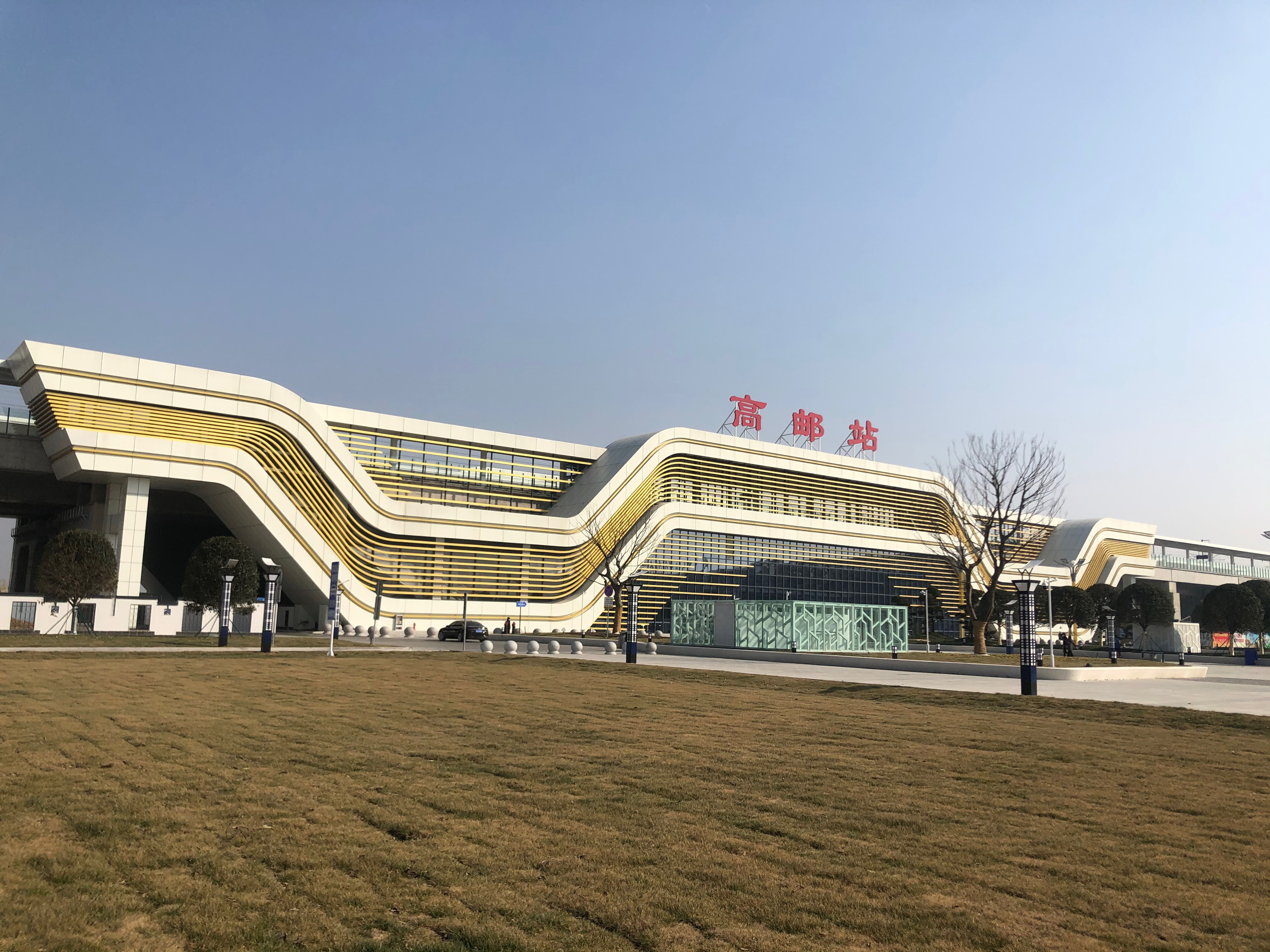

General information
- Location: Gaoyou Subdistrict, Gaoyou, Yangzhou, Jiangsu; China
- Coordinates: 32.775669°N 119.500513°E
- Line(s): Lianyungang–Zhenjiang high-speed railway
- Platforms: 2

History
- Opened: December 11, 2020

Gaoyou railway station (Chinese: 高邮站) is a railway station in Gaoyou Subdistrict, Gaoyou, Yangzhou, Jiangsu, China. It opened with the remaining section of the Lianyungang–Zhenjiang high-speed railway on 11 December 2020.

| Preceding station | China Railway High-speed | Following station |
|---|---|---|
| Gaoyou North towards Lianyungang | Lianyungang–Zhenjiang high-speed railway | Yangzhou East towards Zhenjiang or Dantu |
