= Baoying railway station =

Railway station in Yangzhou, Jiangsu

Baoying 宝应
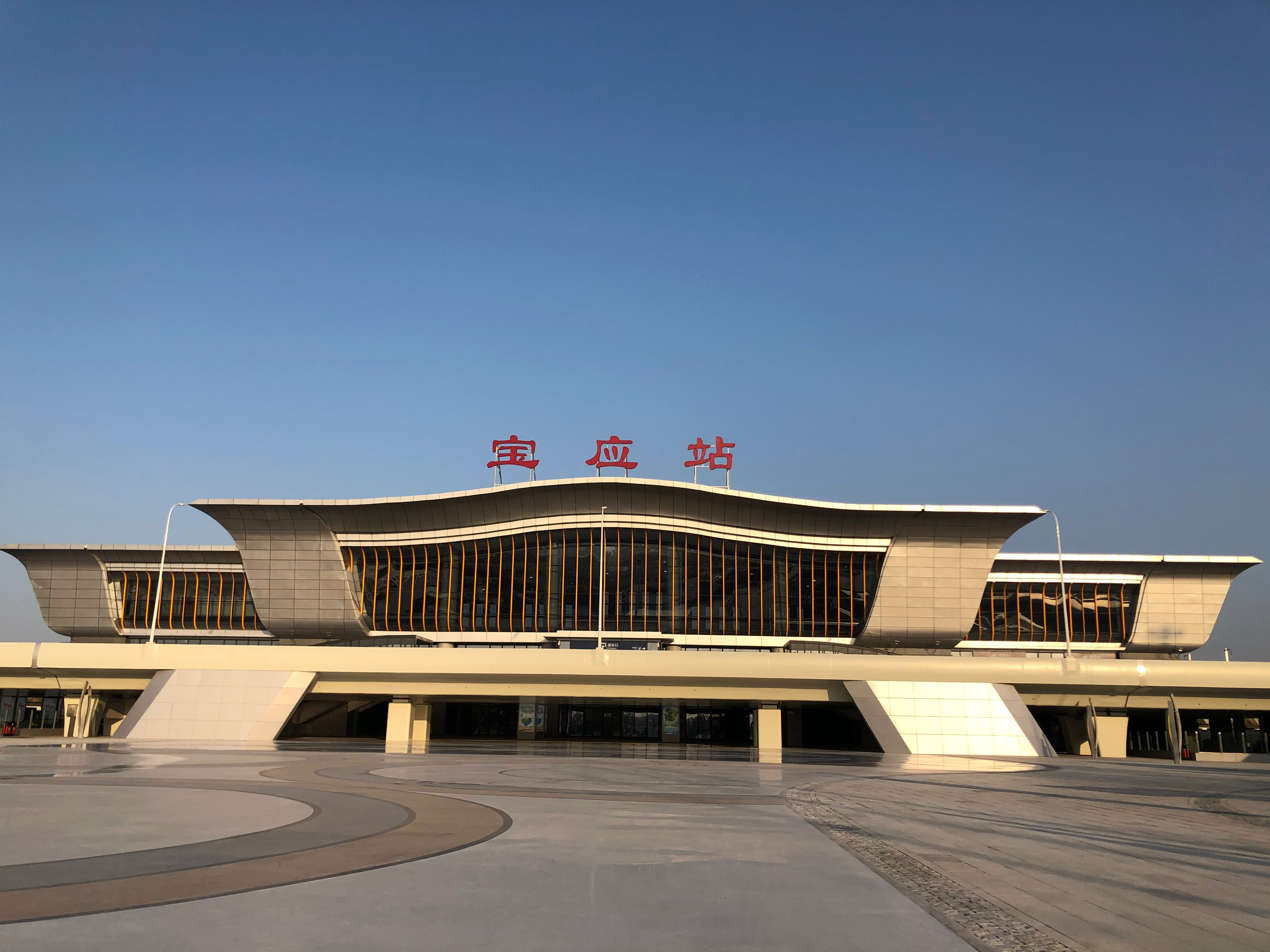

General information
- Location: Baoying County, Yangzhou, Jiangsu; China
- Coordinates: 33.217310°N 119.383124°E
- Line(s): Lianyungang–Zhenjiang high-speed railway
- Platforms: 2

History
- Opened: December 11, 2020

Baoying railway station (Chinese: 宝应站) is a railway station in Baoying County, Yangzhou, Jiangsu, China. It opened with the remaining section of the Lianyungang–Zhenjiang high-speed railway on 11 December 2020.

Preceding station	China Railway High-speed	Following station
Huai'an East towards Lianyungang	Lianyungang–Zhenjiang high-speed railway	Gaoyou North towards Zhenjiang or Dantu
