= Dagang South railway station =

Railway station in Zhenjiang, Jiangsu

Dagang South 大港南
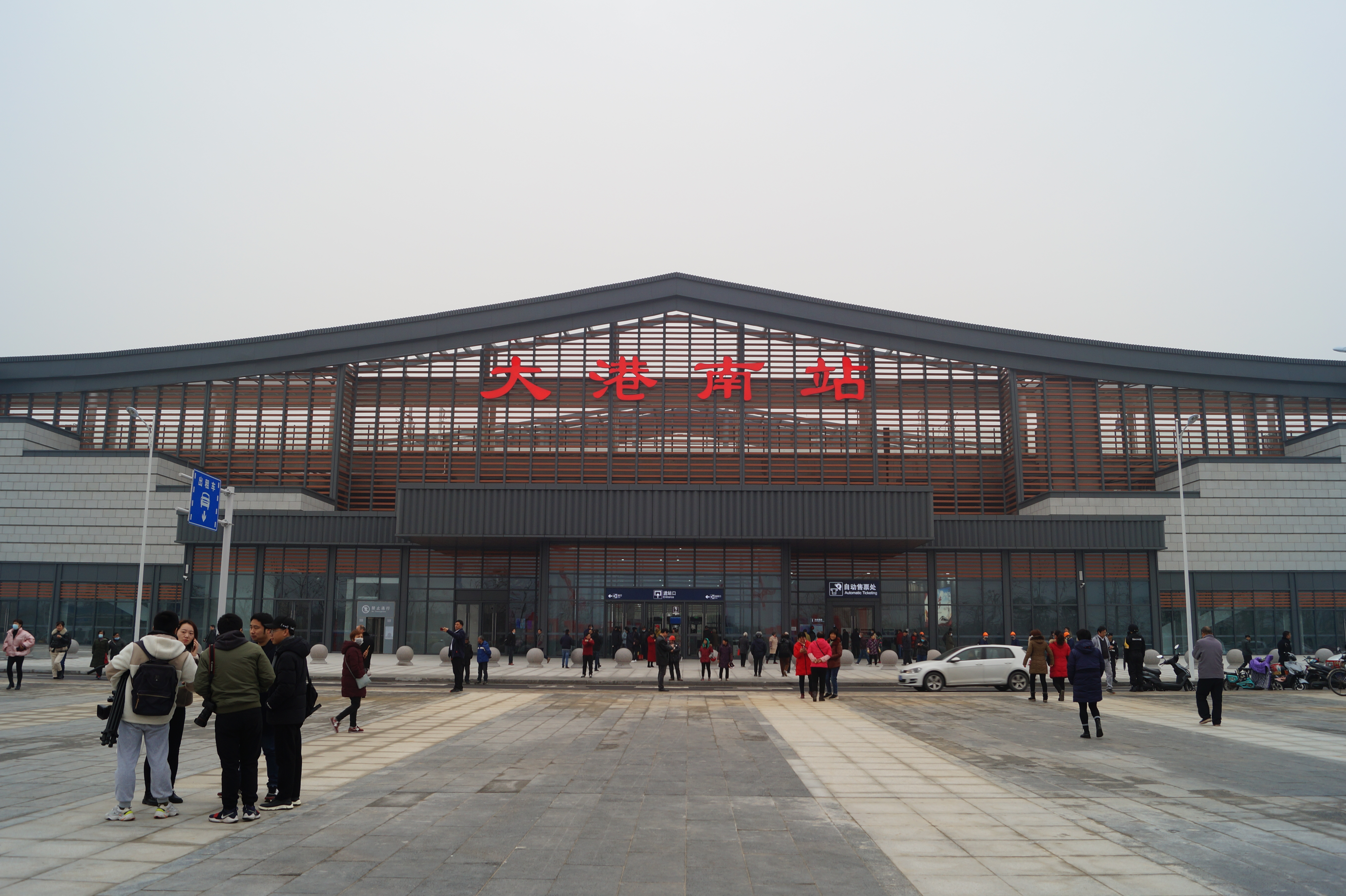

General information
- Location: Jingkou District, Zhenjiang, Jiangsu; China
- Coordinates: 32.134831°N 119.673207°E
- Line(s): Lianyungang–Zhenjiang high-speed railway
- Platforms: 2

History
- Opened: December 11, 2020

Dagang South railway station (Chinese: 大港南站; pinyin: Dàgǎng Nán zhàn) is a railway station in Jingkou District, Zhenjiang, Jiangsu, China. It opened with the remaining section of the Lianyungang–Zhenjiang high-speed railway on 11 December 2020. It had been expected to open the previous month.

Preceding station	China Railway High-speed	Following station
Yangzhou East towards Lianyungang	Lianyungang–Zhenjiang high-speed railway	Dantu towards Zhenjiang or Dantu
