= Baptist Church, Yangzhou =

- 扬州浸会堂
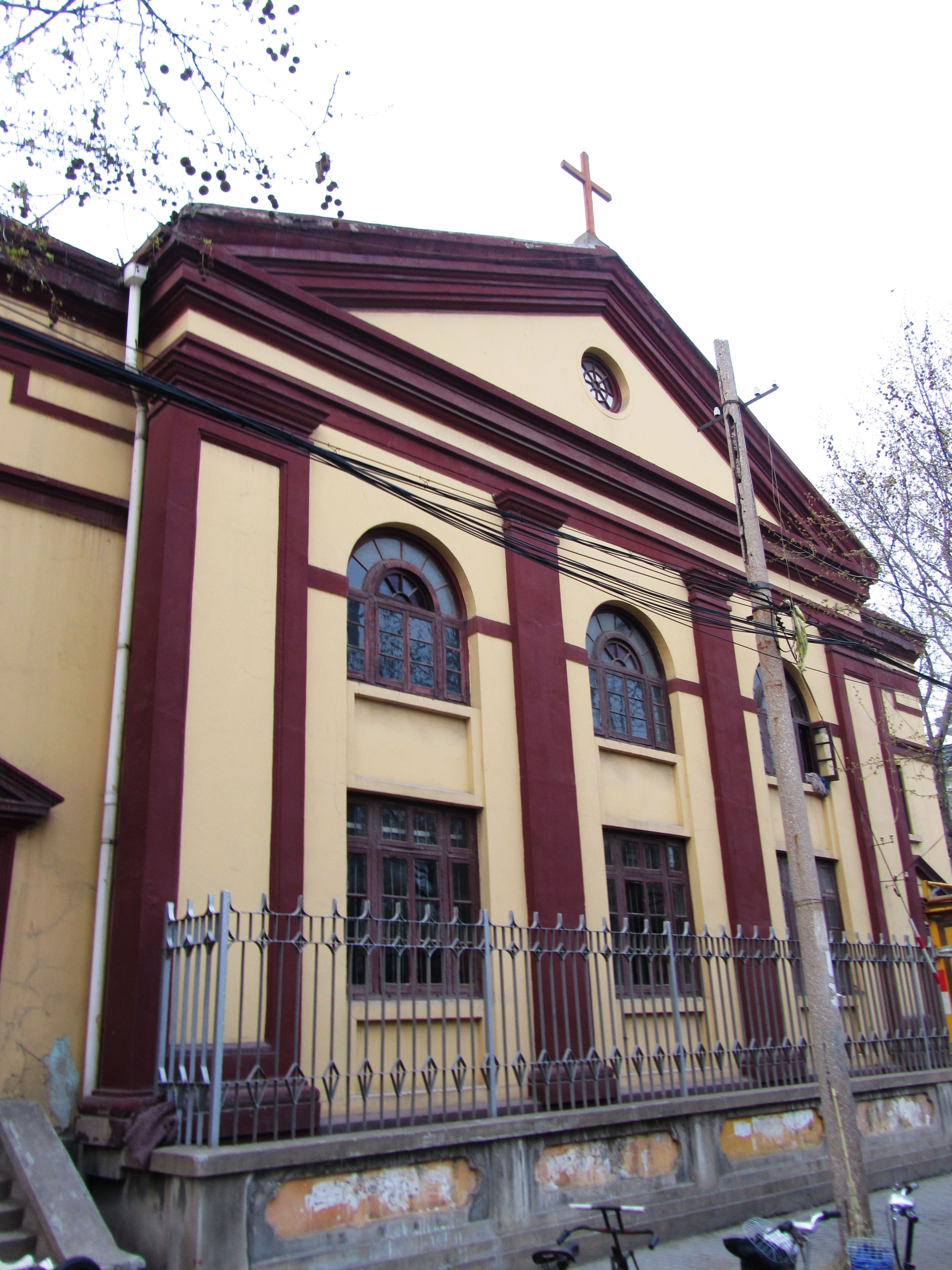
- Baptist Church, Yangzhou in 2011

- Location in Jiangsu
- 32°21′52″N 119°32′28″E
- Location: Guangling District, Yangzhou, Jiangsu, China
- Denomination: Protestantism

History
- Status: Parish church
- Founded: 1923

Architecture
- Functional status: Active
- Architectural type: Church building

Specifications
- Materials: Bricks

Chinese name
- Simplified Chinese: 扬州浸会堂
- Traditional Chinese: 揚州浸會堂
Transcriptions
Standard Mandarin
- Hanyu Pinyin: Yángzhōu Jìnhuì Táng

Baptist Church, Xianliang Street
- Simplified Chinese: 贤良街浸会堂
- Traditional Chinese: 賢良街浸會堂
Transcriptions
Standard Mandarin
- Hanyu Pinyin: Xiánliáng Jiē Jìnhuì Táng

Chapel, Cuiyuan Road
- Simplified Chinese: 萃园路礼拜堂
- Traditional Chinese: 翠園路禮拜堂
Transcriptions
Standard Mandarin
- Hanyu Pinyin: Cuìyuán Lù Lĭbaì Táng

Baptist Church, Yangzhou (Chinese: 扬州浸会堂), locally known as Baptist Church, Xianliang Street (贤良街浸会堂) and Chapel, Cuiyuan Road (萃园路礼拜堂), is a Protestant church located in Guangling District of Yangzhou, Jiangsu, China.

== History ==
The church traces its origins to the former Lingquan Teahouse (灵泉茶馆). The International Mission Board bought it in 1917 and reformed it as a church in 1923. During the Second Sino-Japanese War, the Imperial Japanese Army commandeered it and used it as a cinema and cafe house. The church was restored and redecorated in 1946. The church was closed during the ten-year Cultural Revolution. It was officially reopened to the public in 1981. In January 2008, it was designated as a municipal cultural relic preservation organ by the Yangzhou government.
