= Wufengshan Yangtze River Bridge =

Wufengshan Yangtze River Bridge 五峰山长江大桥
- Coordinates: 32°13′37″N 119°40′30″E
- Carries: Lianyungang–Zhenjiang high-speed railway Jiangsu S68
- Locale: Dantu District, Yangzhou; Jingkou District, Zhenjiang

Characteristics
- Design: double-deck suspension bridge
- Total length: 6,409 m (21,027 ft)
- Width: Upper level: 46 m (151 ft); Lower level: 30 m (98 ft)
- Height: 203 m (666 ft) (west tower); 191 m (627 ft) (east tower)
- Longest span: 1,092 m (3,583 ft)
- No. of lanes: 8

Rail characteristics
- No. of tracks: 4

History
- Construction cost: CN¥ 6.789 billion
- Opened: 11 December 2020

Location
- Interactive map of Wufengshan Yangtze River Bridge

The Wufengshan Yangtze River Bridge (Chinese: 五峰山长江大桥) is a two-decked suspension bridge carrying the Lianyungang–Zhenjiang high-speed railway and the Jiangyi Expressway over the Yangtze. With a total length of 6,409 m (21,027 ft) and a main span of 1,092 m (3,583 ft), it is the world's longest span high-speed railway bridge, tied with the Hutong Yangtze River Bridge.

== History ==
Plans to build a railway bridge at the location had been conceived since the 1960s, but were shelved due to building techniques at the time being insufficient to meet the requirements. Construction was started on 28 October 2015. The structure was closed on 29 December 2019 and the bridge was opened for railway traffic on 11 December 2020.

== Engineering ==
The bridge is fitted with several measures such as dampers and tensioners to reduce deformation from wind, which would inhibit high-speed rail operation. The anchors of the bridge are of the largest ever built as a caisson, measuring 7,260 m^{2} (78,100 sq ft), and weighing 1.33 megatonnes (2.9×10^{9} lb). It also has the largest main cable diameter in the world, each cable contains 352 strands and has a diameter of 1,300 mm (51 in). In the full test before opening, a world record of the operational speed of 275 kph has been achieved for the railway suspension bridge.

== See also ==
- Bridges and tunnels across the Yangtze River
- List of bridges in China
- List of longest suspension bridge spans
- List of tallest bridges
