= Baoying County =

Baoying 宝应县 Paoying
- County
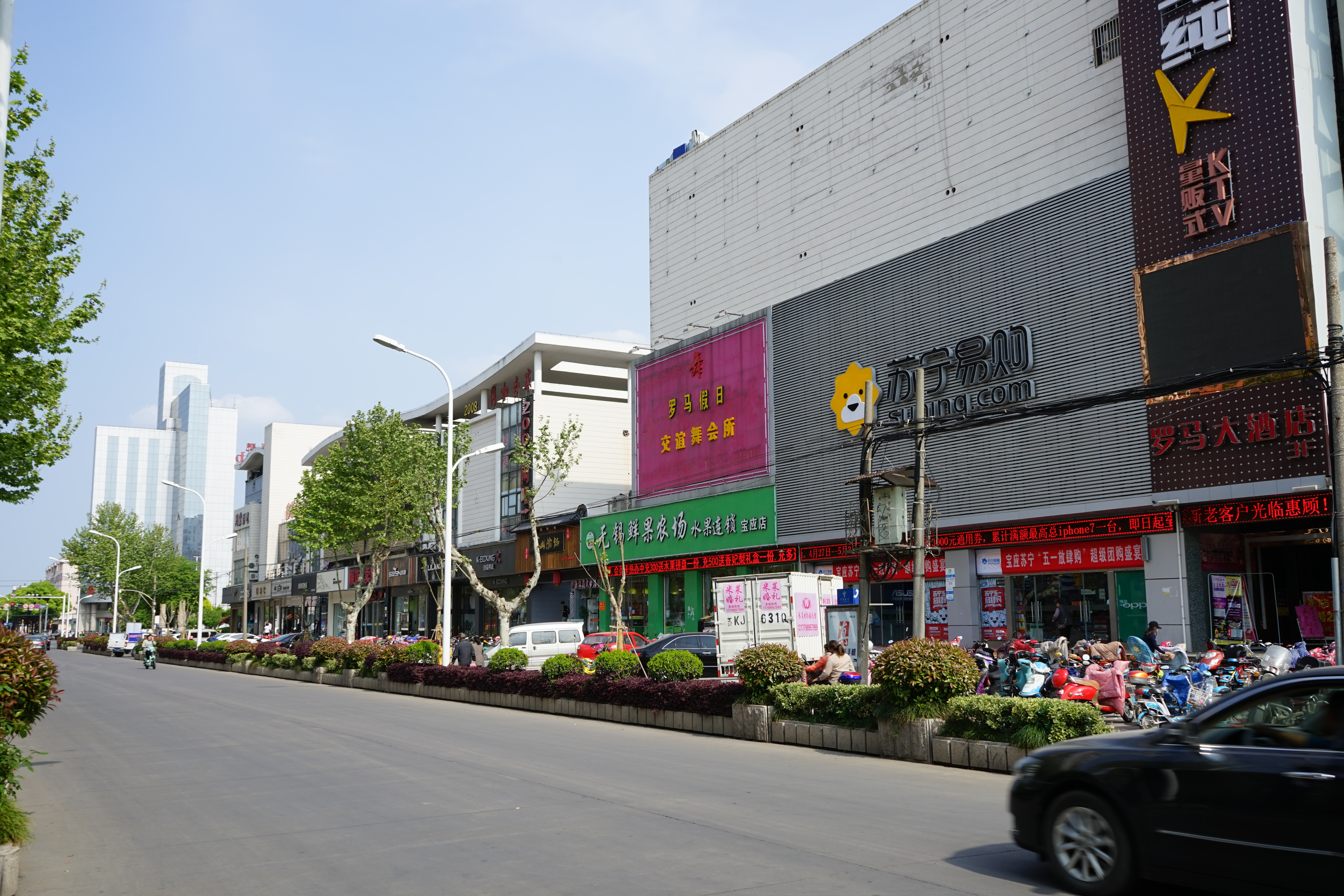
- Anyi East Road, Baoying County

- Location in Jiangsu Baoying (China)
- Coordinates: 33°12′58″N 119°25′44″E
- Country: People's Republic of China
- Province: Jiangsu
- Prefecture-level city: Yangzhou

Area
  - Total: 1,467 km^{2} (566 sq mi)

Population (2018)
  - Total: 920,000
  - Density: 630/km^{2} (1,600/sq mi)
- Time zone: UTC+8 (China Standard)
- Postal code: 225800
- Website: baoying.gov.cn

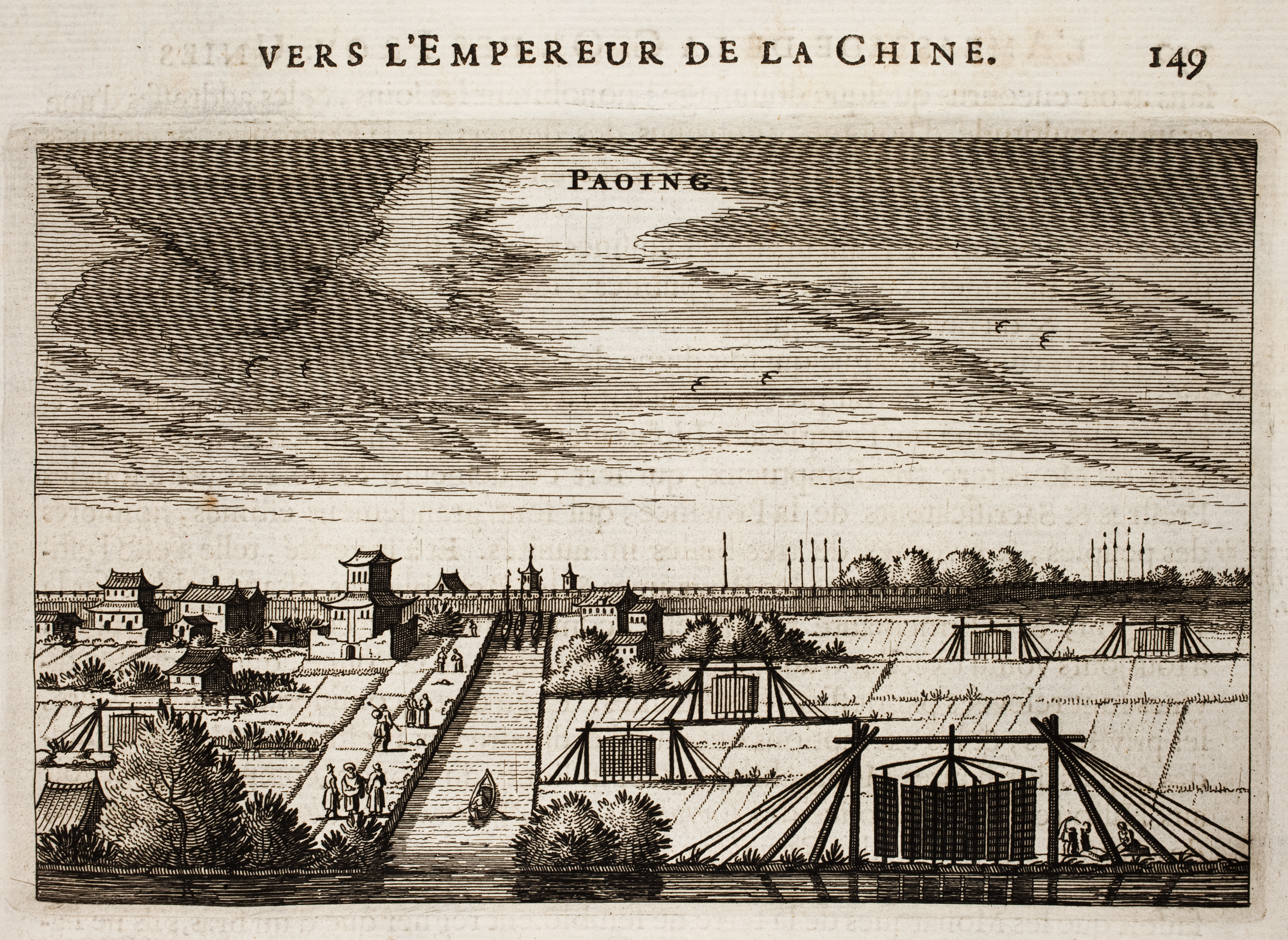
Baoying. Nieuhof: L'ambassade de la Compagnie Orientale des Provinces Unies vers l'Empereur de la Chine, 1665.

Baoying County (simplified Chinese: 宝应县; traditional Chinese: 寶應縣; pinyin: Bǎoyīng Xiàn) is under the administration of Yangzhou, Jiangsu province, China. It has a population of 919,900 (2004) and a land area of 1,483 square kilometres (573 sq mi). The northernmost county-level division of Yangzhou City, it borders the prefecture-level cities of Yancheng to the east and Huai'an to the north and west.

== Administrative ==
Baoying County administers to 14 towns.

- Anyi (安宜镇)
- Fanshui (范水镇)
- Xiaji (夏集镇)
- Liubao (柳堡镇)
- Caodian (曹甸镇)
- Shanyang (山阳镇)
- Luduo (鲁垛镇)
- Huangcheng (黄塍镇)
- Jinghe (泾河镇)
- Sheyanghu (射阳湖镇)
- Xi'anfeng (西安丰镇)
- Guangyanghu (广洋湖镇)
- Xiaoguanzhuang (小官庄镇)
- Wangzhigang (望直港镇)

== Climate ==
Climate data for Baoying, elevation 3 m (9.8 ft), (1991–2020 normals, extremes 1981–present)
Month	Jan	Feb	Mar	Apr	May	Jun	Jul	Aug	Sep	Oct	Nov	Dec	Year
Record high °C (°F)	19.7 (67.5)	25.4 (77.7)	32.3 (90.1)	33.3 (91.9)	35.5 (95.9)	36.8 (98.2)	38.1 (100.6)	38.2 (100.8)	35.7 (96.3)	31.2 (88.2)	27.6 (81.7)	20.9 (69.6)	38.2 (100.8)
Mean daily maximum °C (°F)	6.3 (43.3)	9.1 (48.4)	14.1 (57.4)	20.5 (68.9)	25.9 (78.6)	29.2 (84.6)	31.5 (88.7)	31.0 (87.8)	27.3 (81.1)	22.2 (72.0)	15.5 (59.9)	8.8 (47.8)	20.1 (68.2)
Daily mean °C (°F)	2.1 (35.8)	4.5 (40.1)	9.2 (48.6)	15.4 (59.7)	21.0 (69.8)	24.9 (76.8)	28.0 (82.4)	27.4 (81.3)	23.1 (73.6)	17.5 (63.5)	10.9 (51.6)	4.4 (39.9)	15.7 (60.3)
Mean daily minimum °C (°F)	−1.1 (30.0)	0.9 (33.6)	5.2 (41.4)	10.8 (51.4)	16.5 (61.7)	21.2 (70.2)	24.9 (76.8)	24.4 (75.9)	19.6 (67.3)	13.6 (56.5)	7.1 (44.8)	0.9 (33.6)	12.0 (53.6)
Record low °C (°F)	−12.4 (9.7)	−11.5 (11.3)	−5.9 (21.4)	−0.8 (30.6)	4.9 (40.8)	11.7 (53.1)	18.2 (64.8)	16.1 (61.0)	11.3 (52.3)	1.9 (35.4)	−5.8 (21.6)	−10.4 (13.3)	−12.4 (9.7)
Average precipitation mm (inches)	33.1 (1.30)	36.6 (1.44)	55.5 (2.19)	49.5 (1.95)	76.2 (3.00)	140.4 (5.53)	234.2 (9.22)	178.9 (7.04)	80.6 (3.17)	48.4 (1.91)	47.0 (1.85)	29.1 (1.15)	1,009.5 (39.75)
Average precipitation days (≥ 0.1 mm)	6.7	7.6	8.3	7.7	8.8	9.3	13.3	12.0	7.6	6.3	7.0	5.7	100.3
Average snowy days	3.1	2.3	0.9	0.1	0	0	0	0	0	0	0.5	1.0	7.9
Average relative humidity (%)	70	69	67	67	69	73	80	81	78	73	72	70	72
Mean monthly sunshine hours	149.6	145.1	175.0	198.0	204.1	167.4	185.3	195.6	179.6	179.9	157.2	156.3	2,093.1
Percentage possible sunshine	47	46	47	51	47	39	43	48	49	52	51	51	48
Source: China Meteorological Administration all-time January high

== History ==
=== Etymology ===
Baoying was known as Anyi of Chu zhou (Chu prefecture, 楚州), where supposedly the divine treasures were found in 762. As auspicious tributes, they were presented to the Emperor Suzong of Tang, and found favour with him. It was a coincidence that the then heir apparent, later Emperor Daizong, was the Prince of Chu. The supposed treasures showed the Heaven was sympathetic to the emperor in the future. Thus, the reign title was changed into Baoying (rough meaning: "the treasures show the sympathy [from the Heaven]"), and the county was also bestowed such a name.

== Transportation ==
The area is served by Baoying railway station on the Lianyungang–Zhenjiang high-speed railway.
