= Nanjing–Huai'an intercity railway =

High speed rail line in China

Nanjing–Huai'an intercity railway 宁淮城际铁路

Overview
- Other name: Ninghuai Railway
- Status: Under construction
- Locale: Jiangsu and Anhui provinces
- Termini: Nanjing; Huai'an East
- Stations: 7

Technical
- Line length: 200 kilometres (120 mi)
- Number of tracks: 2
- Track gauge: 1,435 mm (4 ft 8 1/2 in) standard gauge
- Minimum radius: 7,000 metres (23,000 ft); 5,500 metres (18,000 ft) in difficult sections
- Electrification: 25 kV AC overhead
- Maximum incline: normally 2.0%; difficult 3.0%

The Nanjing–Huai'an intercity railway, also known in Chinese as the Ninghuai Railway (Chinese: 宁淮城际铁路; pinyin: Níng–Huái Chéngjì Tiělù) is a high-speed rail line under construction connecting Nanjing and Huai'an in Jiangsu Province. The line is about 200-kilometre (120 mi)-long, with about 156 kilometres (97 mi) in Jiangsu Province and about 44 kilometres (27 mi) in Anhui Province. The design speed is 350 kilometres per hour (220 mph). It is jointly funded by China Railway, Jiangsu Province and Anhui Province. It is considered an important measure to promote the integration of the Yangtze River Delta. Among them, Nanjing City invested RMB ¥249.2 million in the project. Project construction started on 20 September 2019 and is expected to be completed in 2026.

== Route ==
The Nanjing–Huai'an intercity railway connects to Huai'an East station in the north and originates from Huanglou line station of the Lianyungang–Zhenjiang high-speed railway. It runs along the west side of Beijing-Shanghai Expressway and then roughly along the Subei Irrigation Main Canal through Madian, Linji, Fanji, Zhuba in Hongze District, Dailou in Jinhu County, and Tianchang district of Tianchang, Anhui province, and then roughly along the course of the Chuanqiao River to the Liuhe district of Nanjing. Six stations are to be built: Huai'an East, Hongze, Jinhu, Tianchang, Liuhe West and Nanjing North. It crosses the river through the Shangyuanmen tunnel and connects to Nanjing station, connecting with the Shanghai–Nanjing intercity railway.

This intercity line was also one of the options considered for the Beijing−Shanghai high-speed railway Second Channel currently in the planning stage. Unlike other candidate lines, this line, like the Beijing-Shanghai railway, passes through Nanjing and Anhui Province.

== History ==
In 2018, the Nanjing-Huai'an intercity railway was included in the "Jiangsu Province Yangtze River Urban Agglomeration Intercity Railway Construction Plan (2019-2025)" compiled by the Jiangsu Provincial Development and Reform Commission.

On 18 March 2019, the first environmental impact assessment of the Nanjing-Huai'an ICR was announced. On 5 May, the second environmental impact assessment of the Ninghuai Intercity Railway was announced. On 24 August, the Jiangsu section of the Nanjing-Huai'an ICR was approved by the Jiangsu Provincial Development and Reform Commission. On 20 September, the groundbreaking ceremony for the first phase of the Nanjing-Huai'an ICR was held in Huai'an City.

On 27 November 2020, the Anhui Provincial Development and Reform Commission approved the feasibility study report for the Anhui section of the Nanjing-Huai'an ICR.

On 14 September, 2021, the second public announcement of the environmental impact assessment for the Liuhe West to Nanjing North section of the Nanjing-Huai'an ICR was released. On 16 December, the Anhui Provincial Development and Reform Commission approved the preliminary design for the Anhui section.

On 15 February 2022, the Jiangsu Provincial Development and Reform Commission approved the feasibility study report for the Liuhe West to Nanjing North section of the Nanjing-Huai'an ICR. On 22 April, the main construction of the 2.85-kilometer initial section of the Nanjing-Huai'an Intercity Railway was successfully completed. In September, the Jiangsu Provincial Development and Reform Commission approved the preliminary design for the Nanjing section of the Nanjing-Huai'an Intercity Railway.

On 4 January 2023, construction of the Jiangsu section of the Nanjing-Huai'an ICR started. On June 30 of the same year, construction of the Shangyuanmen River Crossing Tunnel started.
