= DQH =

DQH may refer to:

- DQH, the IATA code for Douglas Municipal Airport (Georgia), Georgia, United States
- DQH, the telegraph code for Donghaixian railway station, Lianyungang, Jiangsu, China
