= Lianyungang–Xuzhou high-speed railway =

High speed rail line in China

Lianyungang–Xuzhou high-speed railway 连徐客运专线

Overview
- Status: Operational
- Termini: Lianyungang; Xuzhou East
- Stations: 6

Service
- Operator(s): China Railway High-speed

History
- Opened: 8 February 2021

Technical
- Line length: 180 km (112 mi)
- Track gauge: 1,435 mm (4 ft 8 1/2 in)
- Minimum radius: 7000 m 5500 m in difficult areas
- Operating speed: 350 km/h (217 mph)

The Lianyungang–Xuzhou high-speed railway (Chinese: 连徐客运专线) is a high-speed railway in China. The railway has a design speed of 350 kilometres per hour (220 mph).

The railway runs parallel to the Longhai railway and interchanges with it at Lianyungang and Donghaixian. It is the eastern-most section of the Eurasia Continental Bridge corridor.

== History ==
Construction began on 6 November 2016. The railway, excluding Daxu South, opened on 8 February 2021.

== Stations ==
- Xuzhou East (interchange with the Beijing–Shanghai high-speed railway, Zhengzhou–Xuzhou high-speed railway, and Xuzhou–Yancheng high-speed railway)
- Daxu South
- Pizhou East
- Xinyi South
- Donghaixian (interchange with the Longhai railway)
- Lianyungang (interchange with the Qingdao–Yancheng railway and Longhai railway)
