= Gaoyou Subdistrict =

Gaoyou Subdistrict 高邮街道
- Subdistrict
- Location in Jiangsu
- Coordinates: 32.76988°N 119.45848°E
- Country: People's Republic of China
- Province: Jiangsu
- Prefecture-level city: Yangzhou
- County: Gaoyou
- Time zone: UTC+8 (China Standard)

Gaoyou Subdistrict (Chinese: 高邮街道) is a subdistrict in Gaoyou, Yangzhou, Jiangsu. As of 2020, it has 15 residential communities and 4 villages under its administration.

== Transport ==
- Gaoyou railway station
