= Jieshou, Jiangsu =

Jieshou 界首镇
- Town
- Location in Jiangsu
- Coordinates: 33.00518°N 119.41929°E
- Country: People's Republic of China
- Province: Jiangsu
- Prefecture-level city: Yangzhou
- County: Gaoyou
- Time zone: UTC+8 (China Standard)

Jieshou (Chinese: 界首镇) is a town in Gaoyou, Yangzhou, Jiangsu. As of 2020, it has one residential community and eight villages under its administration.

== Transport ==
- Gaoyou North railway station
