= Jingkou, Zhenjiang =

Jingkou 京口区
- District
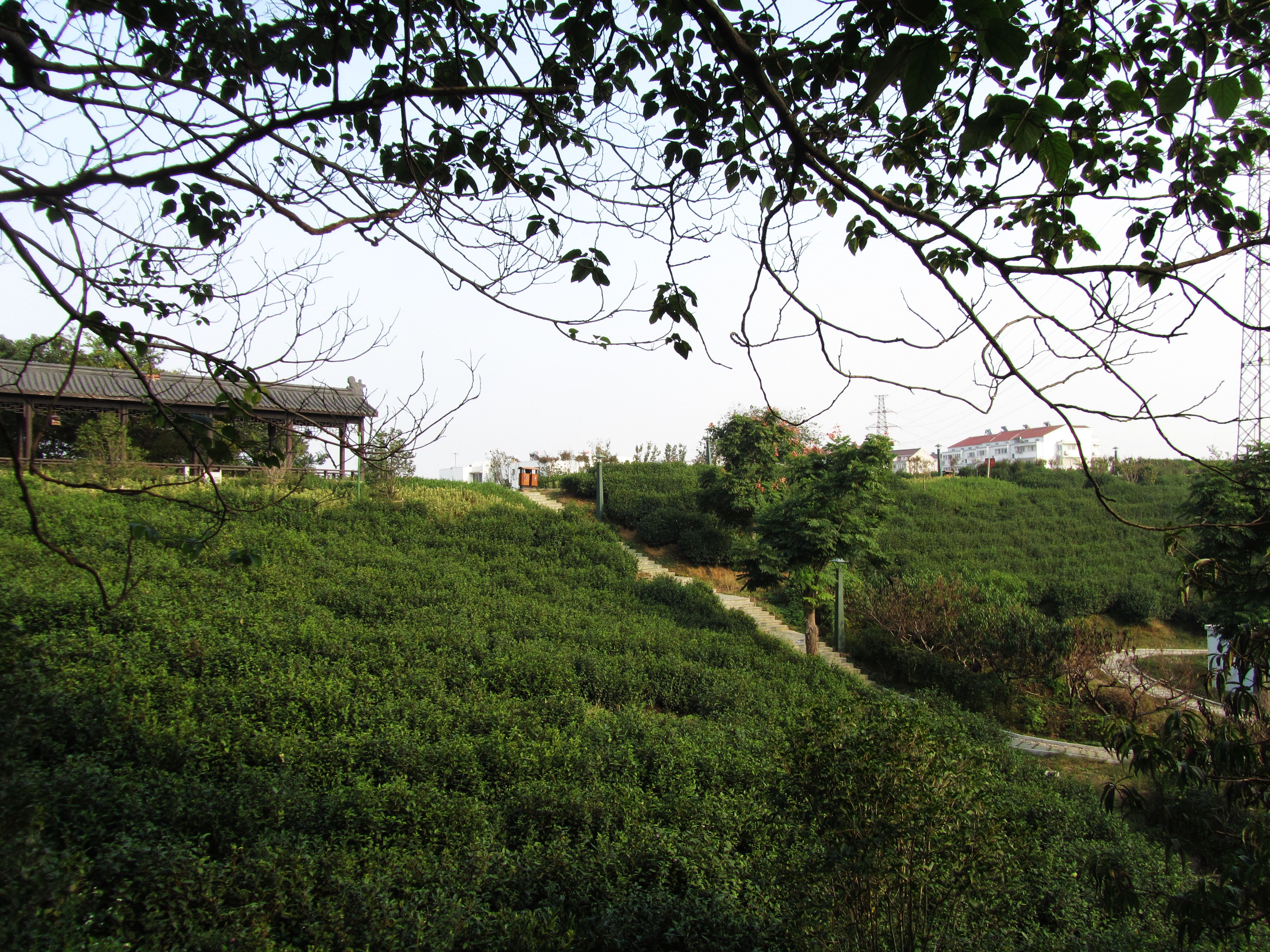

- Location in Jiangsu
- Coordinates: 32°12′05″N 119°27′37″E
- Country: People's Republic of China
- Province: Jiangsu
- Prefecture-level city: Zhenjiang

Area
  - Total: 343.69 km^{2} (132.70 sq mi)

Population (2010)
  - Total: 601,671
  - Density: 1,750.6/km^{2} (4,534.1/sq mi)
- Time zone: UTC+8 (China Standard)
- Postal code: 212001

Jingkou, Zhenjiang
- Traditional Chinese: 京口區
- Simplified Chinese: 京口区
- Literal meaning: Capital Mouth District
Transcriptions
Standard Mandarin
- Hanyu Pinyin: Jīngkǒu Qū

Jingkou District is one of three built-up zones (district) of Zhenjiang, Jiangsu province, China. The district has an area of 115 km^{2} and a population of 410,000 people. The postal code for Jingkou is 212001 and the telephone code is 0511.

In recent years, it was split to form Zhenjiang New Area (镇江新区) which is divided to 2 subdistricts (Dagang Subdistrict (大港街道), Dingmao Subdistrict (丁卯街道)) and 3 towns (Dalu (大路镇), Yaoqiao (姚桥镇), Dinggang (丁岗镇)).

== History ==
Jingkou was the site of the original meeting place between the Grand Canal and the Yangtze River. It was the site of an imperial army garrison under the Qing.

== Administrative divisions ==
Jingkou District has 8 subdistricts and 3 towns.

8 subdistricts

- Zhengdonglu (正东路街道)
- Jiankanglu (健康路街道)
- Dashikou (大市口街道)
- Sipailou (四牌楼街道)
- Xiangshan (象山街道)
- Jianbi (谏壁街道)
- Dingmao (丁卯街道)
- Dagang (大港街道)

3 towns

- Yaoqiao (姚桥镇)
- Dalu (大路镇)
- Dinggang (丁岗镇)

== Transportation ==
Dagang South railway station is situated here.
