= Donghaixian railway station =

Railway station in Donghai County, China

Donghaixian 东海县

General information
- Location: 41 Zhanqian Street; Donghai County, Lianyungang, Jiangsu; China
- Coordinates: 34.5182°N 118.7627°E
- Operator: CR Shanghai
- Lines: Longhai railway; Lianyungang–Xuzhou high-speed railway
- Platforms: 3 (1 side platform and 1 island platform)
- Tracks: 6
- Connections: Bus terminal

Other information
- Station code: 38546 (TMIS code); DQH (telegraph code); DHX (Pinyin code)
- Classification: Class 3 station (三等站)

History
- Opened: 1925
- Former names: Niushan (Chinese: 牛山)
Location
- Location within Jiangsu Location within China

Donghaixian railway station (Chinese: 东海县站, literally "Donghai County railway station") is a station on Longhai railway in Donghai County, Lianyungang, Jiangsu.

== History ==
The station was established in 1925 as Niushan railway station (Chinese: 牛山站). It was changed to the current name in 1957.

On 10 September 2020, passenger services were suspended to allow for construction of the Lianyungang–Xuzhou high-speed railway.

Preceding station	China Railway	Following station
Lianyungang towards Lianyungang East	Longhai railway	Xinyi towards Lanzhou
Preceding station	China Railway High-speed	Following station
Lianyungang Terminus	Eurasia Continental Bridge corridor	Xinyi South towards Ürümqi
