= Guangling, Yangzhou =

Guangling 广陵区
- District
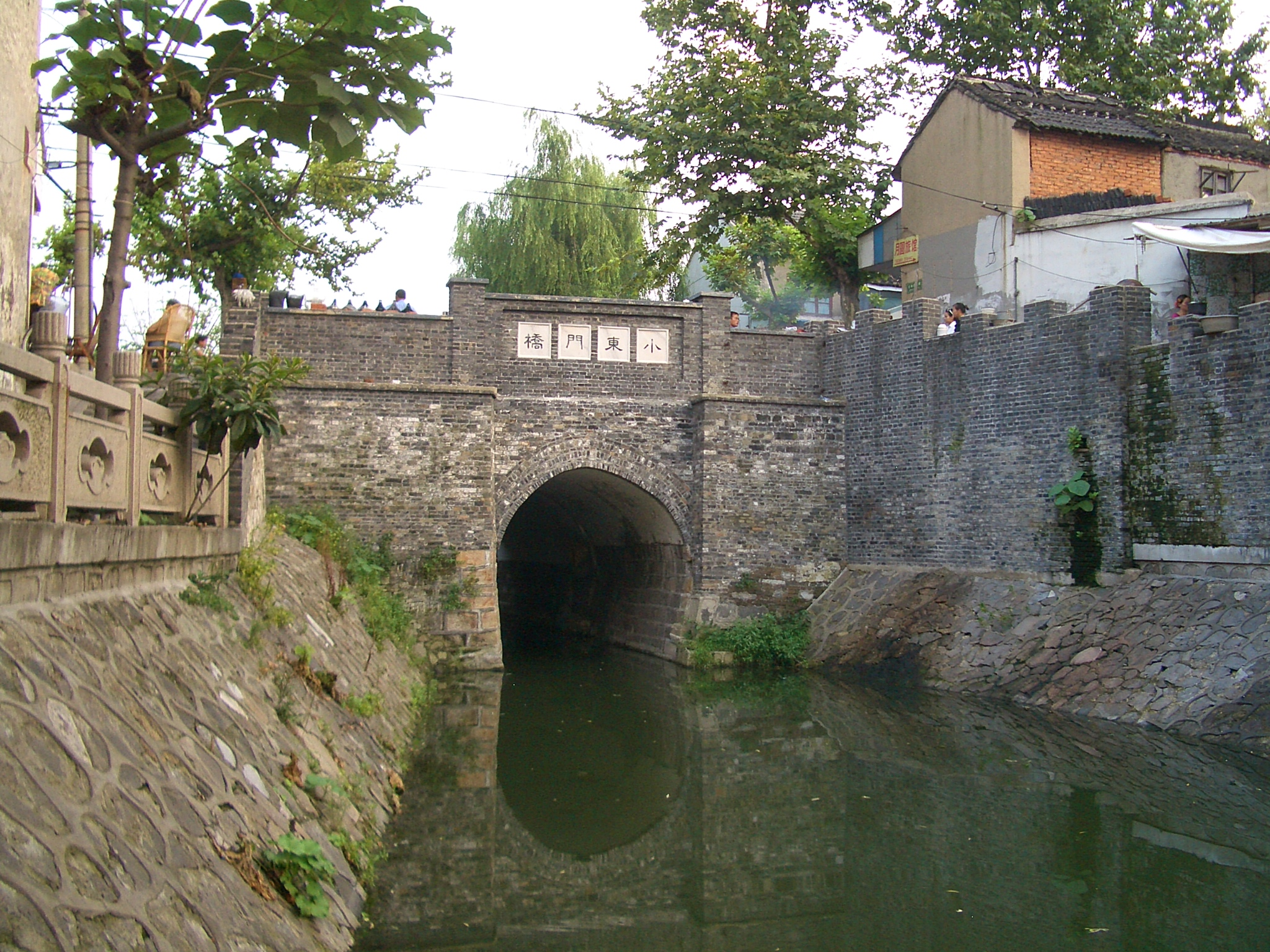
- The Xiaoqinhuaihe Canal in downtown Yangzhou

- Location in Jiangsu
- Coordinates: 32°21′47″N 119°34′26″E
- Country: People's Republic of China
- Province: Jiangsu
- Prefecture-level city: Yangzhou

Area
  - Total: 341.96 km^{2} (132.03 sq mi)

Population (2013)
  - Total: 498,200
  - Density: 1,457/km^{2} (3,773/sq mi)
- Time zone: UTC+8 (China Standard)
- Postal code: 225002

Guangling District (simplified Chinese: 广陵区; traditional Chinese: 廣陵區; pinyin: Guǎnglíng Qū) is one of three districts of Yangzhou, Jiangsu province, China. The district includes the eastern half of Yangzhou's main urban area (including Yangzhou's historic center within the former city wall), and the city's eastern suburbs. The other half of the city's main urban area is in Hanjiang District.

== Administrative divisions ==
At present, Guangling District has 4 subdistricts, 1 town and 1 township.

4 subdistricts

- Dongguan (东关街道)
- Wenhe (汶河街道)
- Wenfeng (文峰街道)
- Qujiang (曲江街道)

1 town

- Wantou (湾头镇)

1 township

- Tangwang (汤汪乡)

== Transportation ==
Yangzhou East railway station is located here.
