= Lianyungang–Zhenjiang high-speed railway =

High speed rail line in China

Lianyungang–Zhenjiang high-speed railway 连镇客运专线
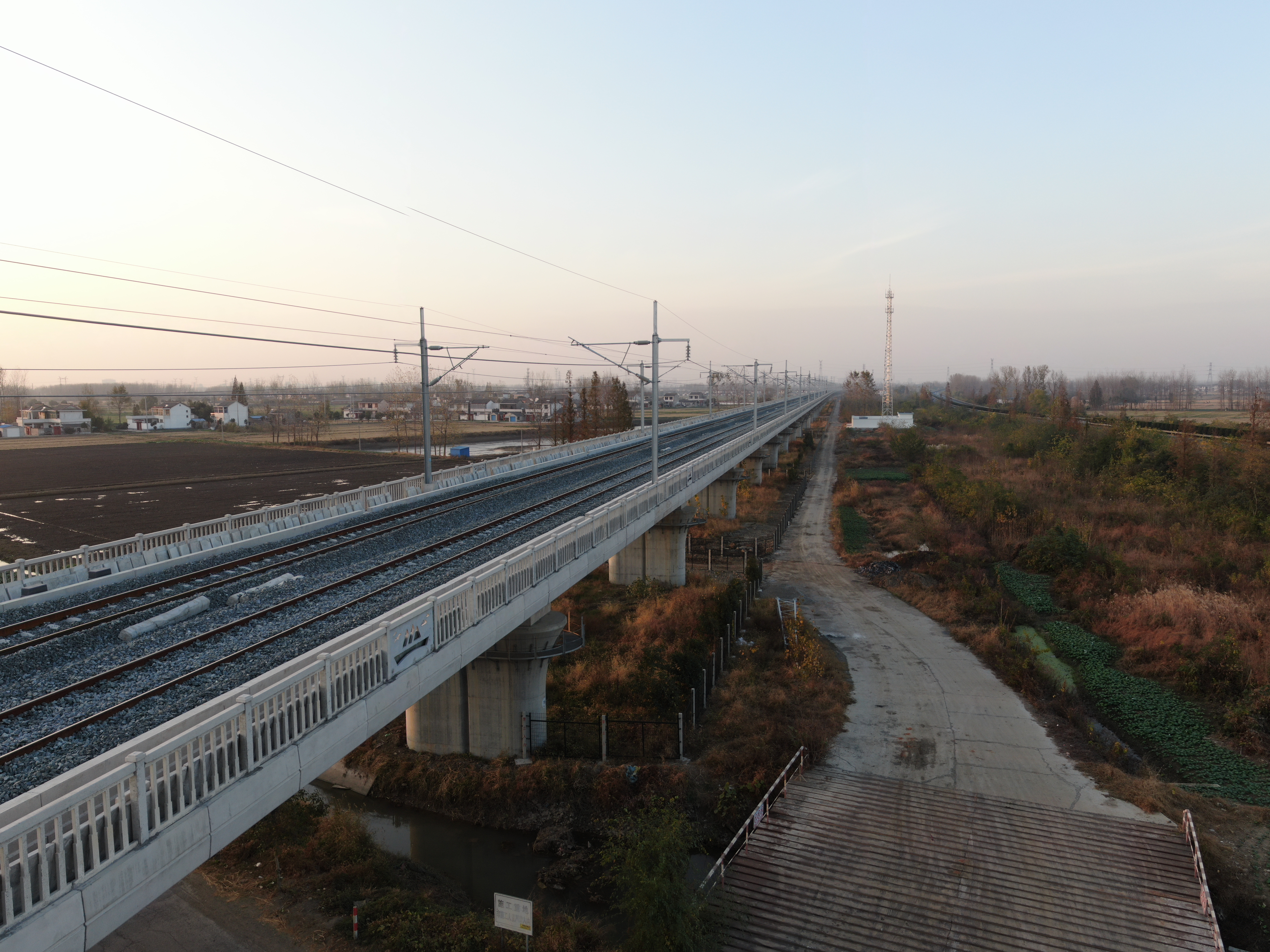

Overview
- Status: Operating
- Termini: Lianyungang; Dantu
- Stations: 12

Service
- Operator(s): China Railway High-speed

History
- Opened: 16 December 2019 (Lianyungang–Huai'an East); 11 December 2020 (Huai'an East–Dantu)

Technical
- Track gauge: 1,435 mm (4 ft 8 1/2 in)
- Operating speed: 250 km/h (155 mph)

The Lianyungang–Zhenjiang high-speed railway is a high-speed railway in China. It has a design speed of 250 kilometres per hour (160 mph).

== History ==
In November 2014, construction was expected to take 4.5 years.

The section from Lianyungang to Huai'an opened on 16 December 2019. The remainder was expected to open on 3 December 2020, however this did not go ahead. It opened on 11 December.

== Route ==
Heading south from Lianyungang, the railway splits from the Qingdao–Yancheng railway after Dongji and continues south, serving Guanyun, Guannan, and Lianshui. The line meets the Xuzhou–Yancheng high-speed railway at Huai'an East but splits again to continue south. Three stations follow: Baoying, Gaoyou North, and Gaoyou. From the north, both east and west connections to the Nanjing–Qidong railway are provided, but no connection is provided from the south. The line then serves Yangzhou East. The line then passes over the Wufengshan Yangtze River Bridge before heading west and serving Dagang South. At its southern terminus Dantu, the line joins the Shanghai–Nanjing intercity railway.

== Stations ==
Station Name	Chinese	China Railway and CRH transfers/connections
Lianyungang	连云港	Qingdao–Yancheng railway Longhai railway Qingdao–Yancheng railway
Dongji	董集	
Guanyun	灌云	
Guannan	灌南	
Lianshui	涟水	
Huai'an East	淮安东	Xuzhou–Yancheng high-speed railway
Baoying	宝应	
Gaoyou North	高邮北	
Gaoyou	高邮	
Yangzhou East	扬州东	
Dagang South	大港南	
Dantu	丹徒	Shanghai–Nanjing intercity railway
