= Dantu railway station =

Railway station in Zhenjiang, Jiangsu, China

Coordinates: 32.11797°N 119.51584°E

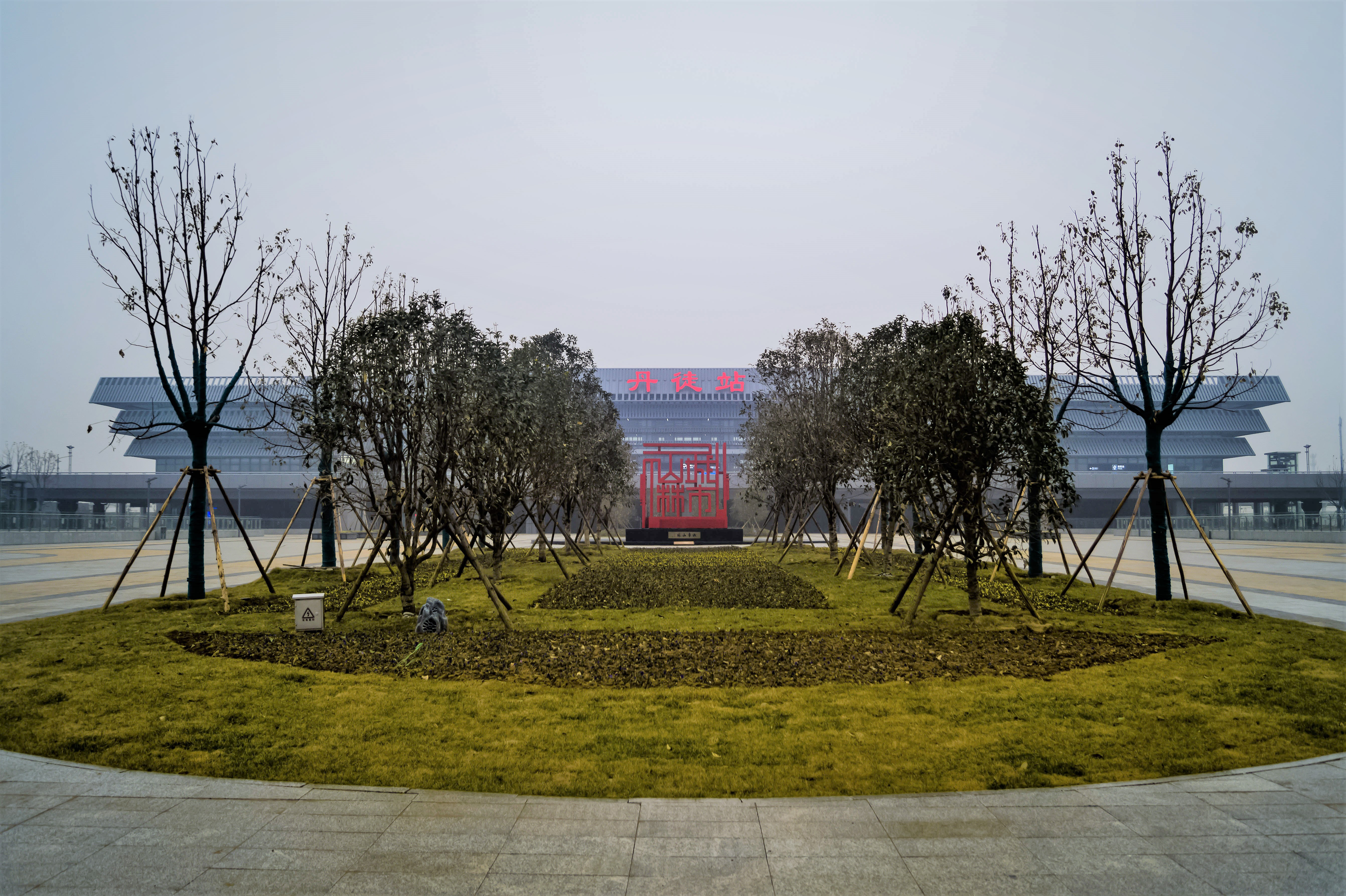
Station building in 2021

Dantu railway station, formerly known as Sanshan West railway station during construction, is a railway station of Shanghai-Nanjing Intercity Railway located in Dantu District, Zhenjiang, Jiangsu, People's Republic of China.

During the construction of the Lianyungang–Zhenjiang high-speed railway, this station was rebuilt.

| Preceding station | China Railway High-speed | Following station |
|---|---|---|
| Changzhou towards Shanghai or Shanghai Hongqiao | Shanghai–Nanjing intercity railway | Zhenjiang towards Nanjing |
| Dagang South towards Lianyungang | Lianyungang–Zhenjiang high-speed railway | Terminus |
