= Zhenjiang railway station =

Railway station in Zhenjiang, China

Zhenjiang 镇江
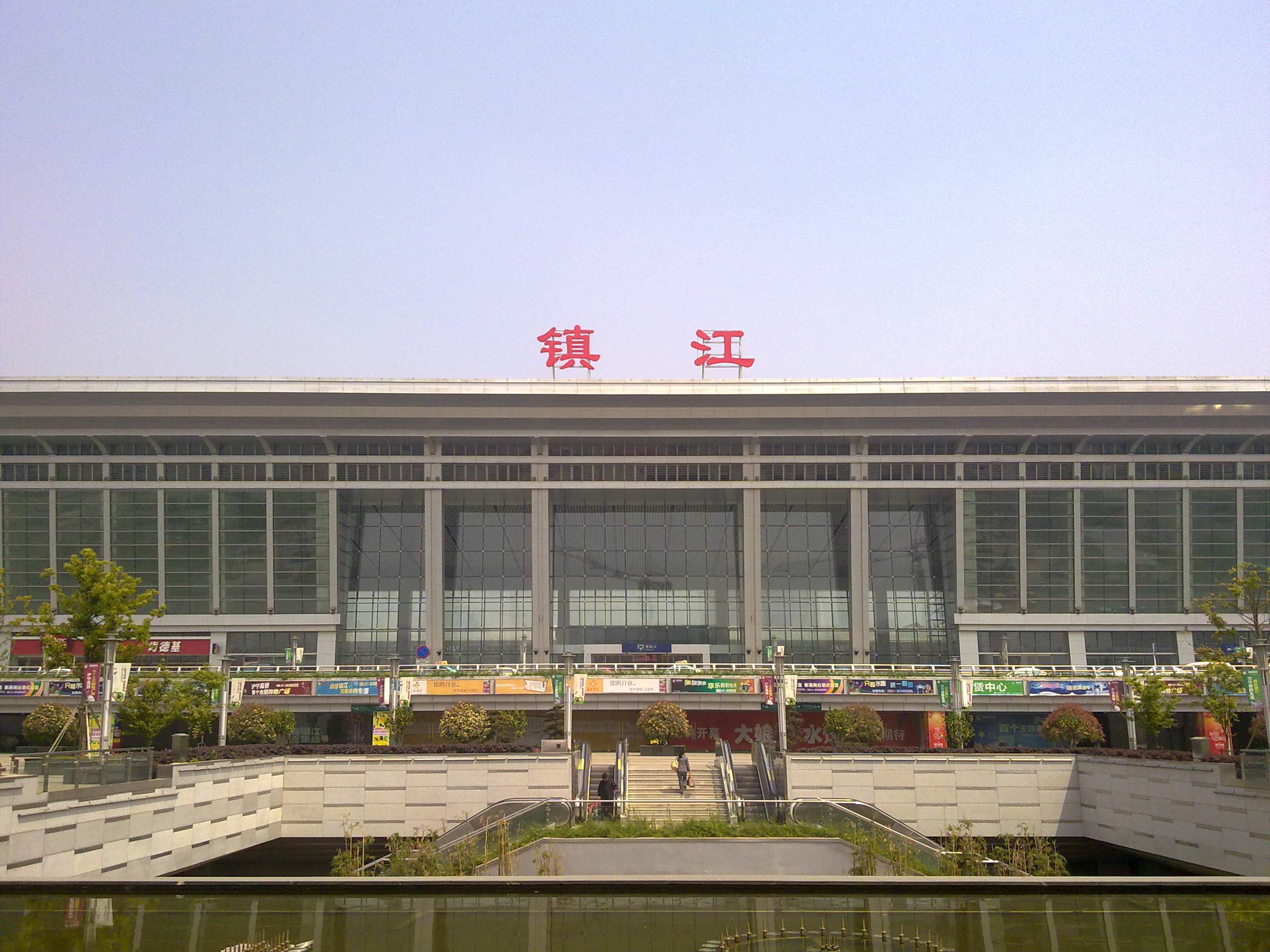
- Zhenjiang railway station

General information
- Location: Runzhou District, Zhenjiang, Jiangsu; China
- Coordinates: 32°11′57″N 119°25′37″E
- Operated by: China Railway Shanghai Group, China Railway Corporation
- Lines: Beijing–Shanghai railway, Shanghai–Nanjing intercity railway
- Platforms: 3

Other information
- Station code: 30407 (TMIS code); ZJH (telegraph code); ZJI (pinyin code)
- Classification: 1st class station

History
- Opened: 1908
Location

Zhenjiang railway station
- Traditional Chinese: 鎮江站
- Simplified Chinese: 镇江站
Transcriptions
Standard Mandarin
- Hanyu Pinyin: Zhènjiāng zhàn

Zhenjiang railway station (simplified Chinese: 镇江站; traditional Chinese: 鎮江站; pinyin: Zhènjiāng zhàn) is a railway station of Beijing–Shanghai railway and Shanghai–Nanjing intercity railway. The station is located in Zhenjiang, Jiangsu, China.

== History ==
The original Zhenjiang railway station opened in 1908, as part of the Shanghai–Nanjing railway. In 1977, to handle increasing passenger load, the station was relocated to a new site on the west side of the city.

In May 2010, simultaneously with the opening of the Shanghai–Nanjing intercity railway (whose tracks, in Zhenjiang area, closely parallel those of the original Shanghai–Nanjing railway), the new Zhenjiang railway station was opened on the southern side of the tracks, opposite the old railway station, which is north of the tracks (32°12′2″N 119°25′39″E). As of the early 2011, the old railway station serves all the non-CRH trains (i.e., the conventional T, K, and slower trains) as well as some of the CRH D-series trains; the new railway station serves the Shanghai–Nanjing intercity railway trains (i.e., all G-series trains) as well as most of the D-series trains. There is a long underground pedestrian passage connecting the northern and southern railway stations' plazas.

The Zhenjiang railway station serves as an important rail gateway for the nearby city of Yangzhou, which, due to its location on a little-served railway branch (Nanjing–Qidong railway), only sees a few trains a day. The Coach Station with frequent service to Yangzhou (and other nearby cities) is adjacent to the new Zhenjiang railway station.

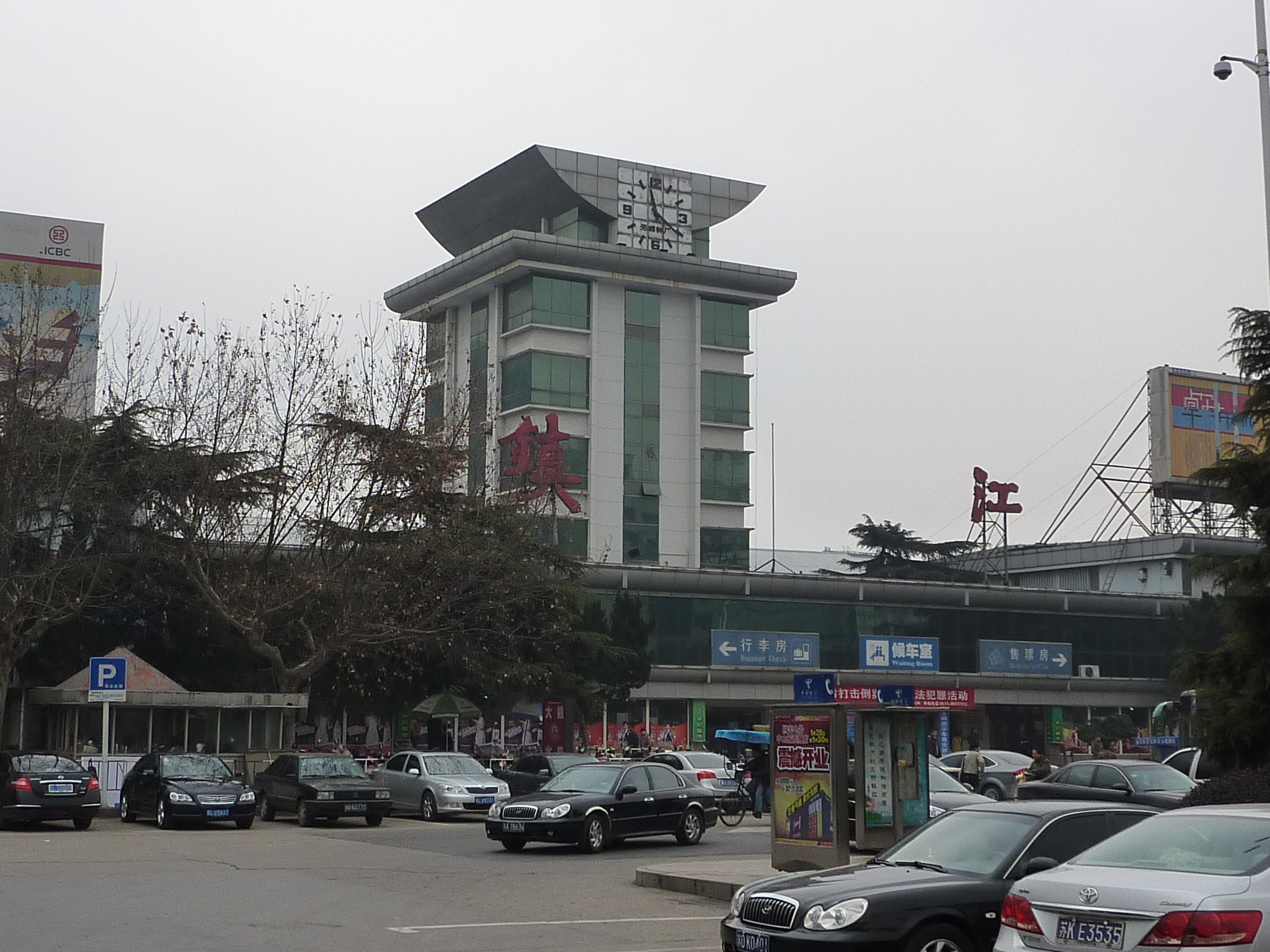
The old railway station, north of the tracks

Preceding station	China Railway High-speed	Following station
Dantu towards Shanghai or Shanghai Hongqiao	Shanghai–Nanjing intercity railway	Baohuashan towards Nanjing
Hengshan towards Lianyungang	Lianyungang–Zhenjiang high-speed railway	Terminus
