= Lianyungang railway station =

Railway station in Lianyungang, China

Lianyungang 连云港
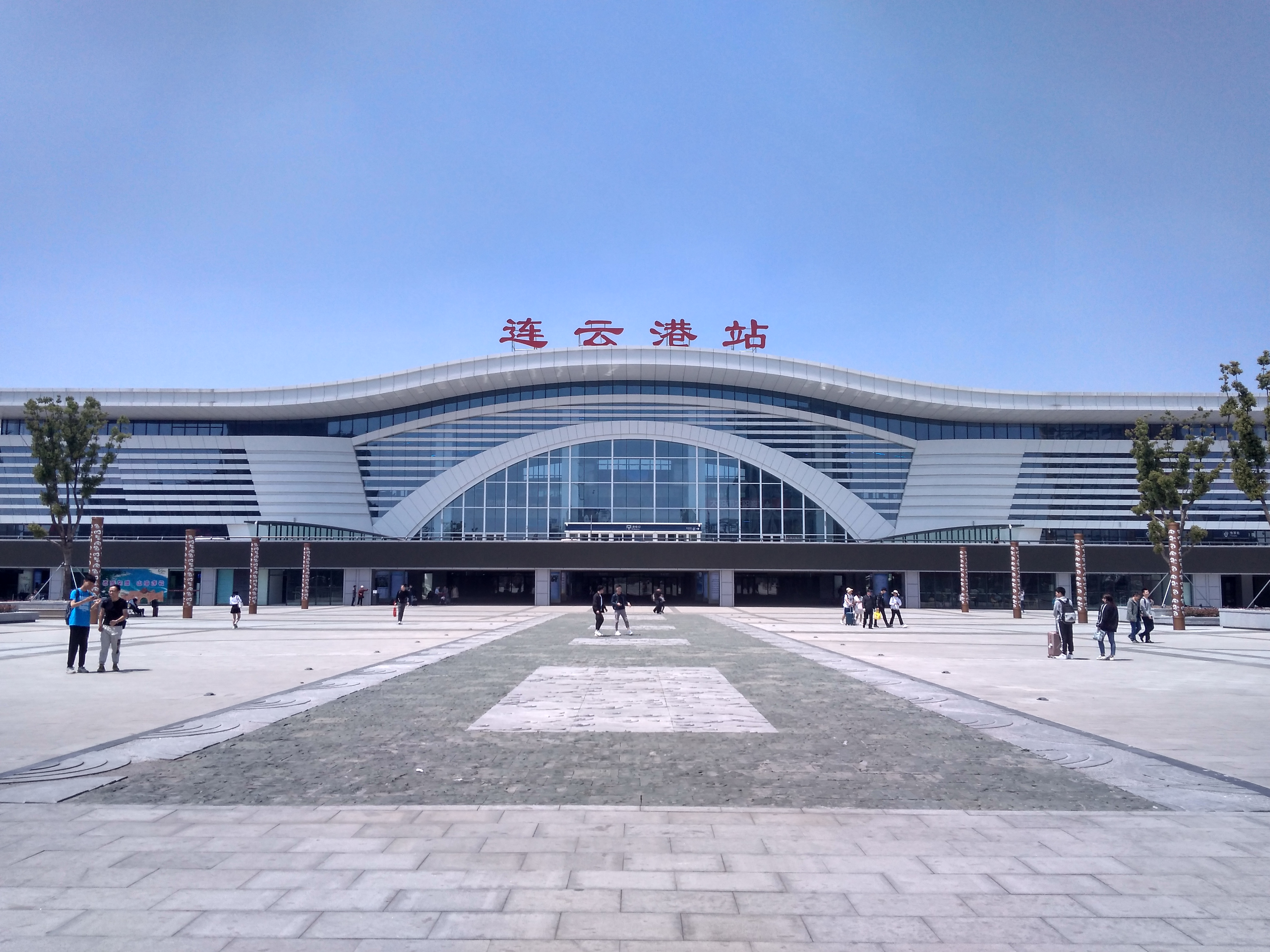
- New station building opened in 2018

General information
- Location: 1 Renmin E. Road; Haizhou District, Lianyungang, Jiangsu; China
- Coordinates: 34.6098°N 119.1578°E
- Operator: CR Shanghai
- Lines: Longhai railway; Qingdao–Yancheng railway; Lianyungang–Zhenjiang high-speed railway; Lianyungang–Xuzhou high-speed railway
- Platforms: 9 (1 side platform and 4 island platforms)
- Tracks: 12
- Connections: Bus terminal

Other information
- Station code: 38531 (TMIS code); UIH (telegraph code); LYG (Pinyin code)
- Classification: Class 2 station (二等站)

History
- Opened: 1925
- Former names: Xinpu (Chinese: 新浦)
Location
- Location within Jiangsu Location within China

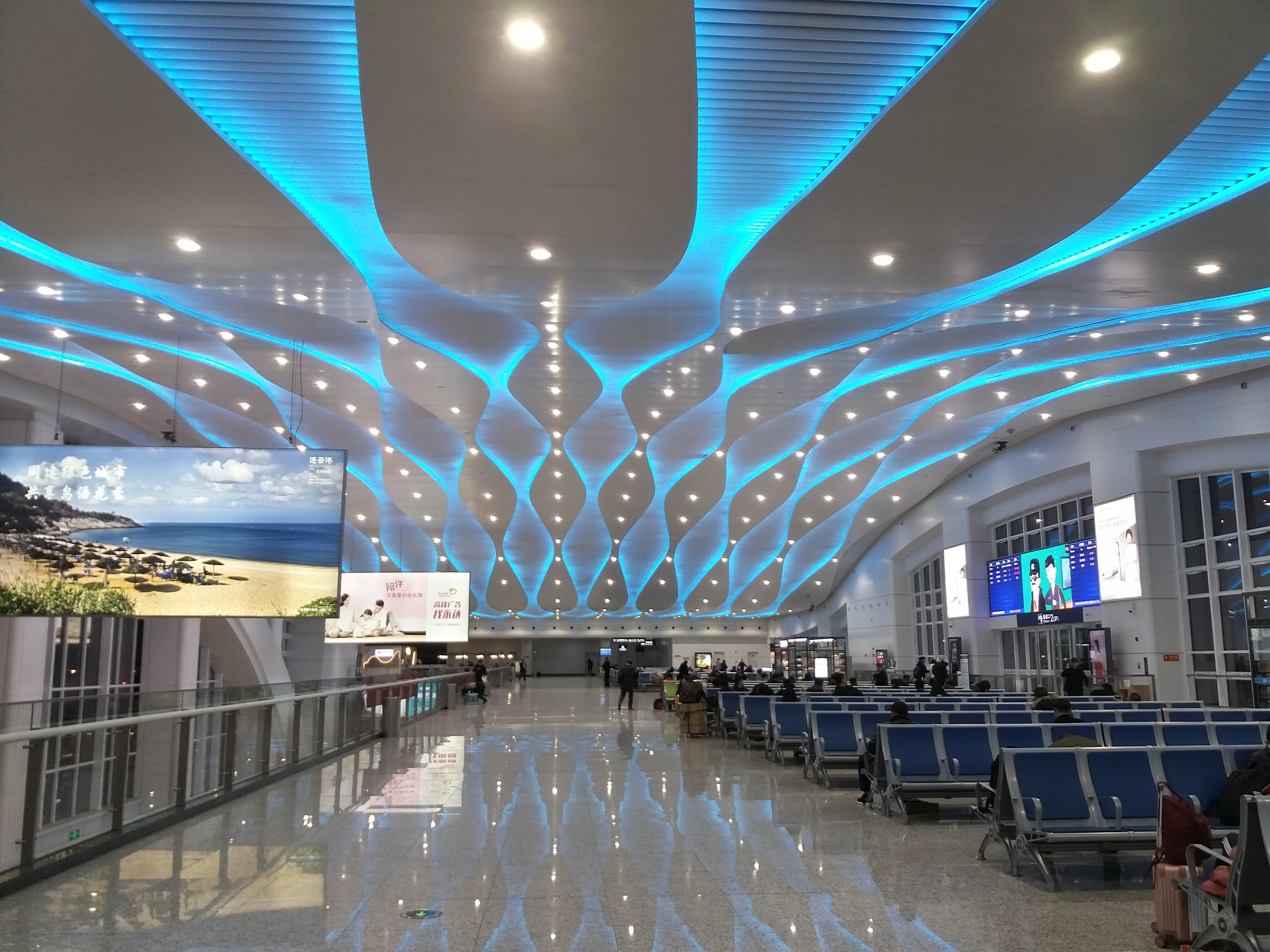
Inside Lianyungang Railway Station

Lianyungang railway station (Chinese: 连云港站) is a station in Haizhou District, Lianyungang, Jiangsu.

== History ==
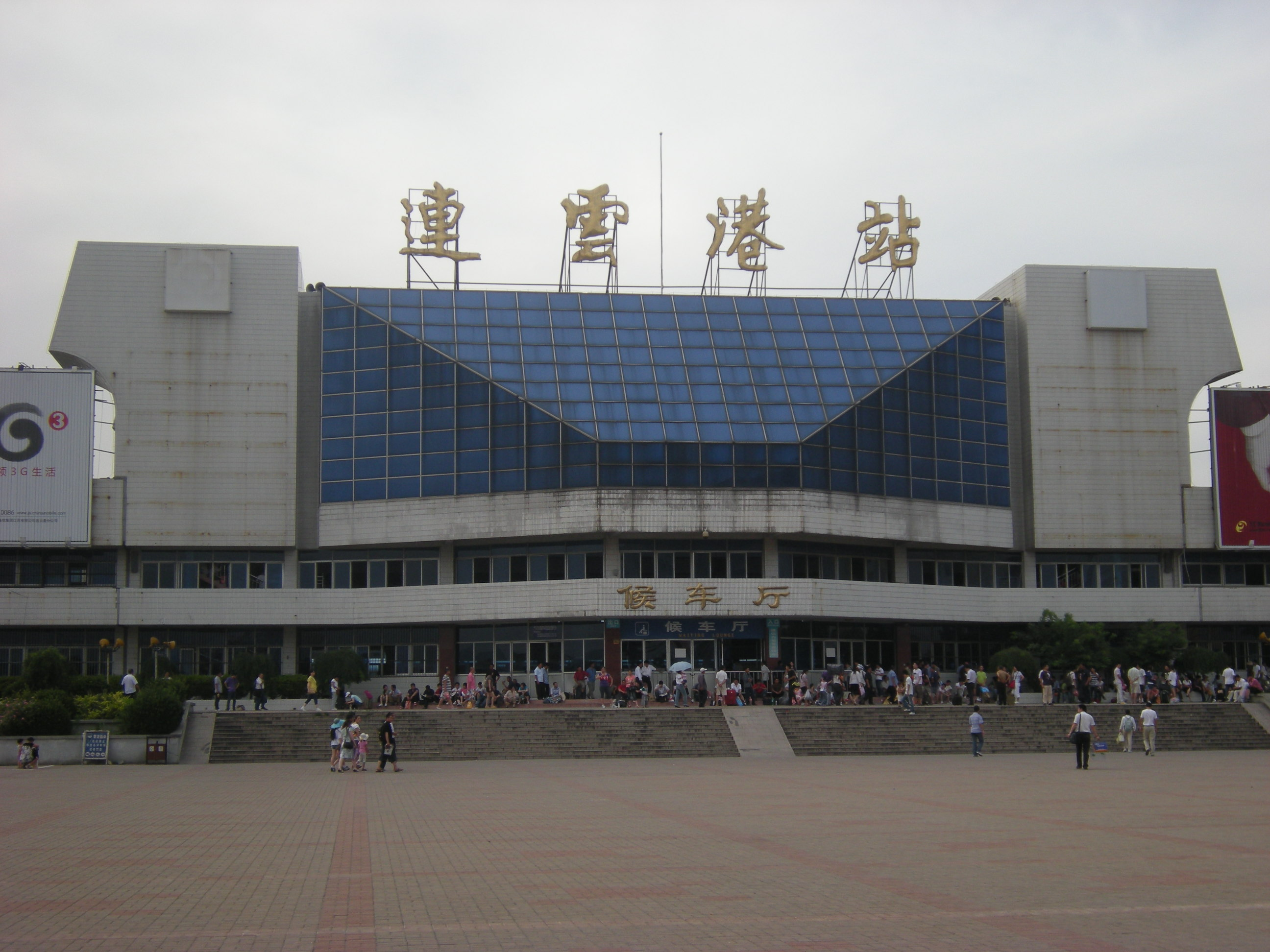
The former station building (opened in 1998 and demolished in 2016)

The station was established in 1925. The former site of the station was on Jiefang E. Road in the city center.

In 1998, the station was moved to the current site together with the relocation of Longhai railway out of Lianyungang city center.

The station was once named as Xinpu railway station (Chinese: 新浦站). It was changed to the current name on 1 January 2004.

On 20 March 2015, the renovation and expansion project of the station started and the passenger services of the station was suspended. The former station building, opened in 1998, was demolished in 2016 to make room for new platforms and tracks. The new station building is 16 metres (52 ft) south of the former site.

Preceding station	China Railway	Following station
Yantuo towards Lianyungang East	Longhai railway	Donghaixian towards Lanzhou
Preceding station	China Railway High-speed	Following station
Terminus	Eurasia Continental Bridge corridor	Donghaixian towards Ürümqi
