= Sanduo =

Sanduo may refer to:

- Sando (official) (1876–1941), a Qing dynasty and Republic of China official who was the last Qing viceroy of Mongolia
- Sanduo, Jiangsu (三垛), a town in Gaoyou, Jiangsu, China
- Sanduo Township (三多乡), a township in Daning County, Shanxi, China
- Sanduo Shopping District metro station, Kaohsiung Metro, Taiwan
