= Military town =

Military town or military city may refer to:

- Amsar, a type of Arabic military town established during the Arabic expansion
- Canaba, a type of town that emerged as a civilian settlement around a castrum in Ancient Rome
- Cantonment
- Cantonment (Pakistan)
- Major castra of Roman empire
- Garrison town, a town associated with a military base
- List of modern military towns
- Military townlet, in Russia, Soviet Union and some other post-Soviet states
- Military town (China), defense towns in ancient China

== See also ==
- Coast Guard City
- Cossack host
- Military settlement
- Ribat
