= Yongning, Beijing =

Yongning Town 永宁镇
- Town
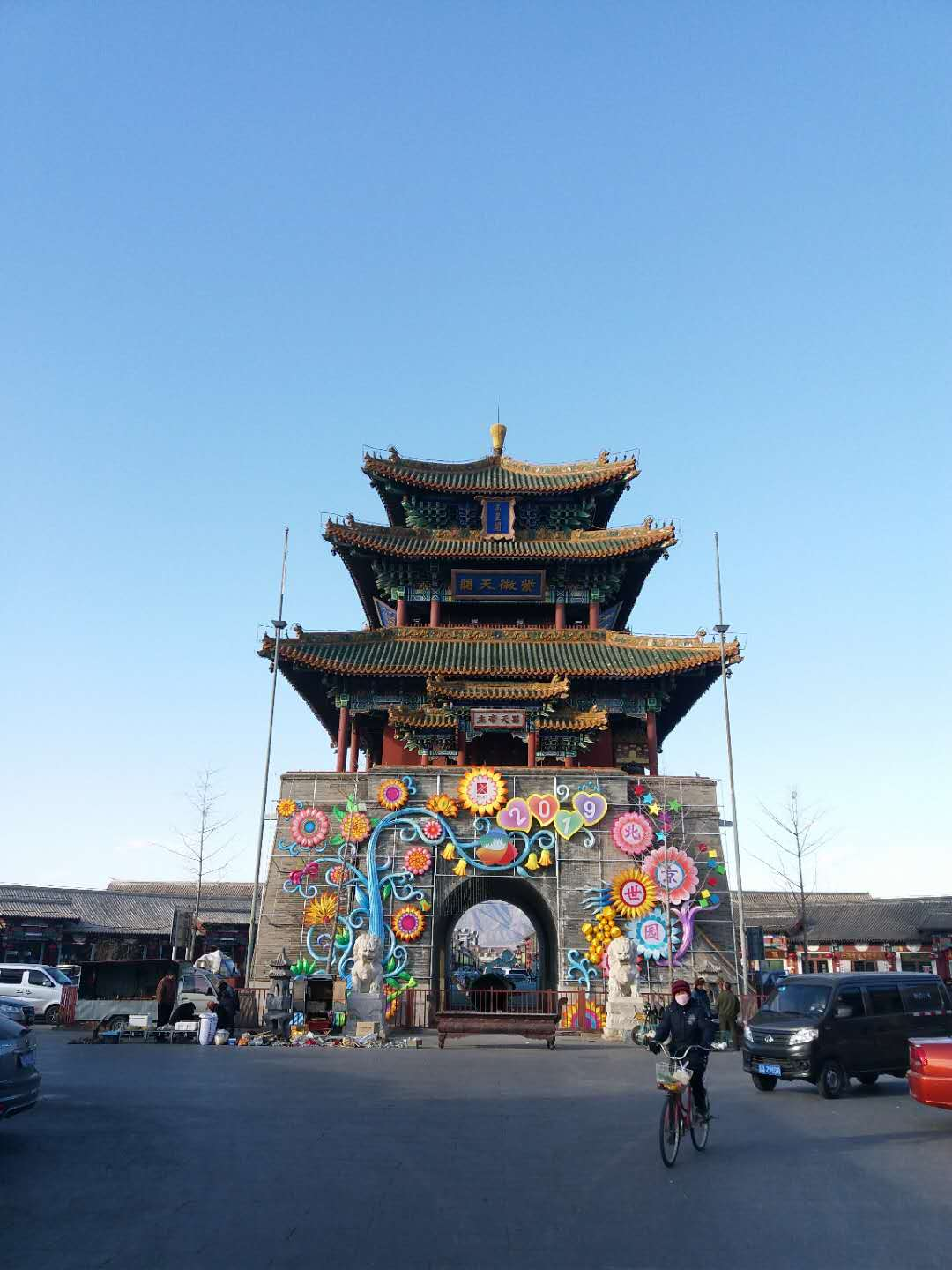
- Town Square Tower of Yongning, 2018

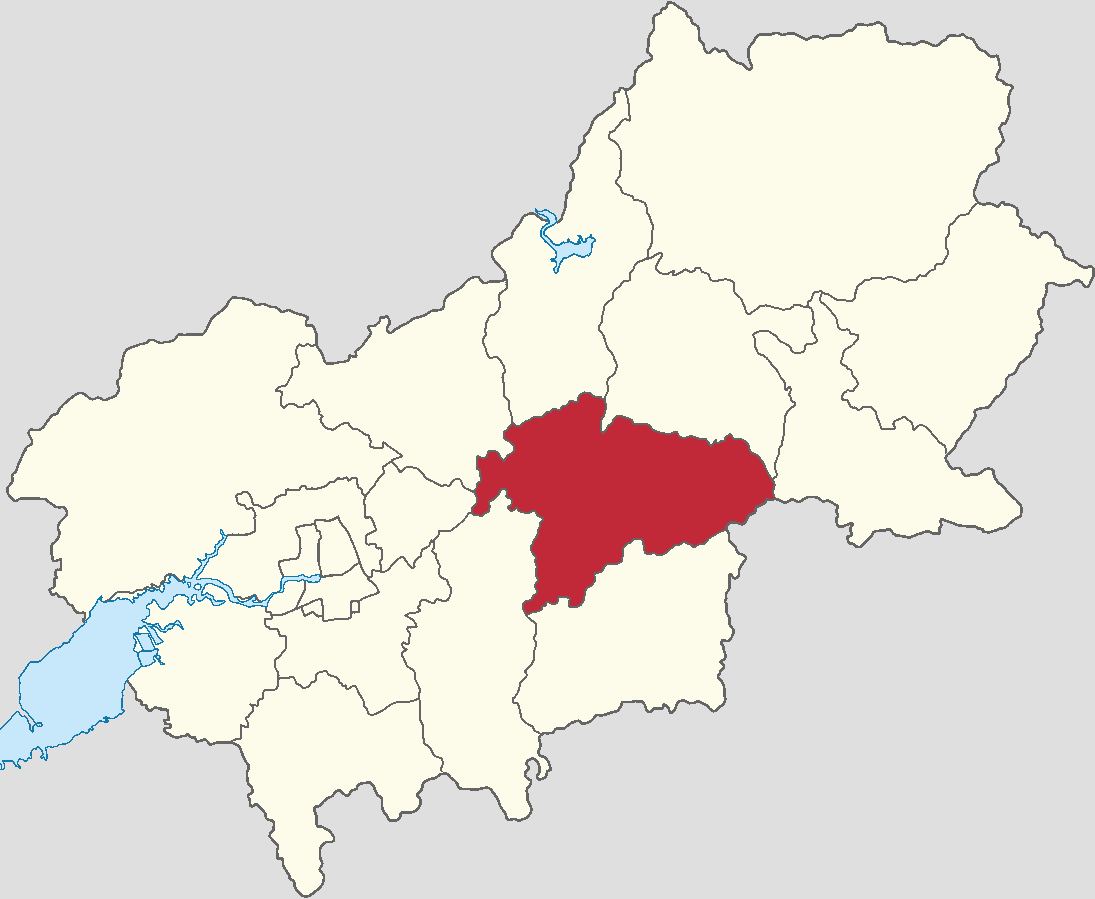
- Location in Yanqing District

- Location within Beijing Location within China
- Coordinates: 40°31′43″N 116°09′51″E
- Country: China
- Municipality: Beijing
- District: Yanqing
- Village-level Divisions: 1 communities 36 villages

Area
  - Total: 146.1 km^{2} (56.4 sq mi)
- Elevation: 517 m (1,696 ft)

Population (2020)
  - Total: 23,483
  - Density: 160.7/km^{2} (416.3/sq mi)
- Time zone: UTC+8 (China Standard)
- Postal code: 102104
- Area code: 010

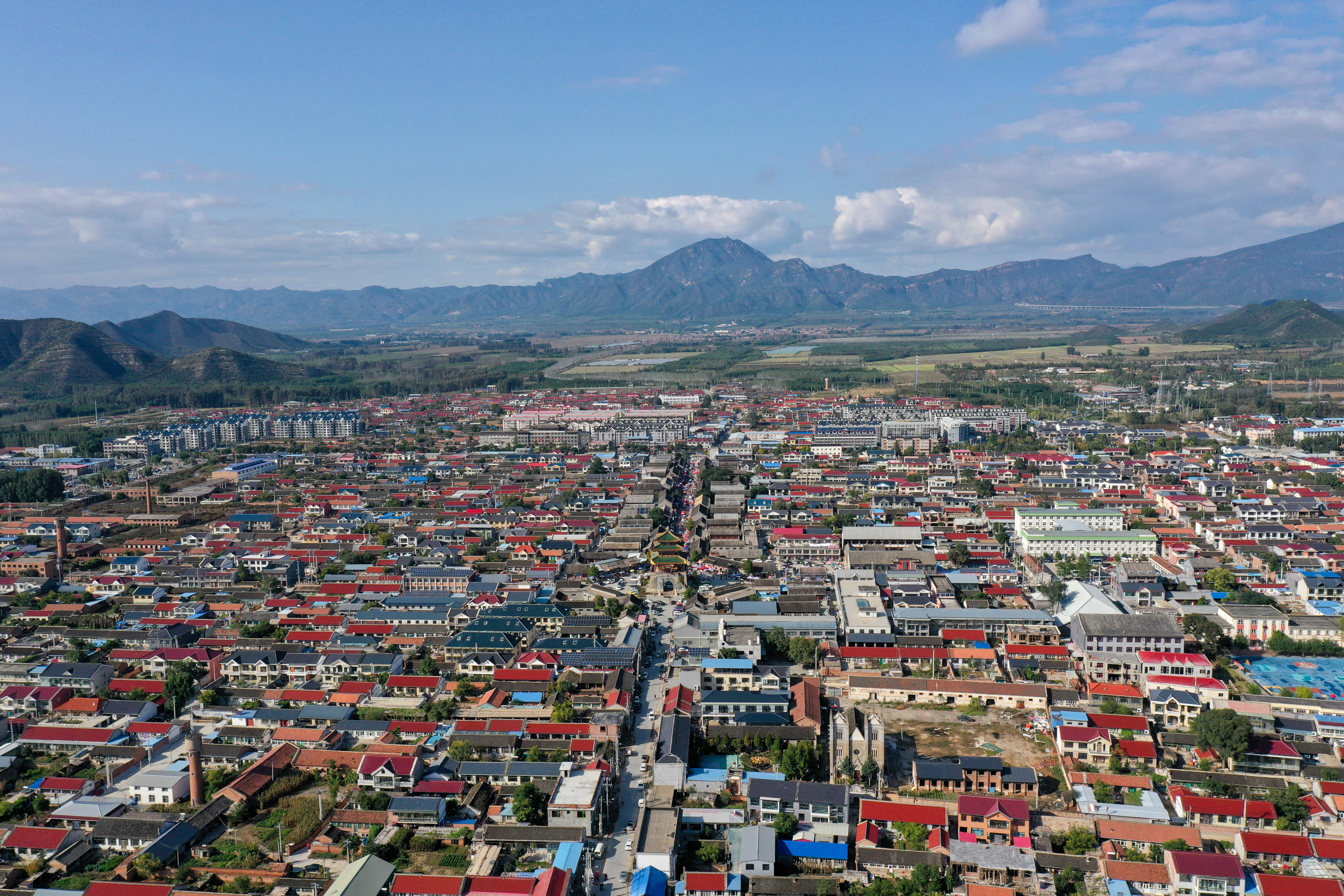
Aerial view of Yongning Town, 2021

Yongning Town (simplified Chinese: 永宁镇; traditional Chinese: 永寧鎮; pinyin: Yǒngníng Zhèn) is a town in the Yanqing District of Beijing. It is a small town in rural Beijing but has a long history as an economic and military center. A government initiative in the 2000s to rehabilitate the town has restored its architectural landmarks. It is located to the south of Xiangying and Liubinbao Townships, west of Sihai and Jiuduhe Towns, north of Dazhuangke Township and Jingzhuang Town, and east of Shenjiaying and Jiuxian Towns. As of 2020, it had 23,483 residents under its administration.

The region was named Yongning in 1414 with the meaning of "Eternal Peace".

== Geography ==
Yongning Town is on the eastern part of Yanhuai Basin, with Xinhuaying River flowing pass the western portion of the town.

== History ==
During the Ming dynasty it was an important military town, serving as the eastern command of the Xuanfu garrison area. There were 8,000 troops under the jurisdiction of Yongning town during that period. However, by the late Qing dynasty the town declined in importance. By the end of the Cultural Revolution in 1976, the cultural relics of the town's past were gone.

== Administrative divisions ==
So far in 2021, Yongning Town is formed from 37 subdivisions, with 1 community and 36 villages. They are listed as follows:

Subdivision names	Name transliterations	Type
永宁镇	Yongningzhen	Community
河湾	Hewan	Village
北沟	Beigou	Village
清泉铺	Qingquanpu	Village
罗家台	Luojiatai	Village
王家堡	Wangjiapu	Village
水口子	Shuikouzi	Village
偏坡峪	Pianpoyu	Village
二铺	Erpu	Village
营城	Yingcheng	Village
马蹄湾	Matiwan	Village
西山沟	Xishangou	Village
永新堡	Yongxinpu	Village
狮子营	Shiziying	Village
上磨	Shangmo	Village
吴坊营	Wufangying	Village
小庄科	Xiaozhuangke	Village
前平坊	Qianpingfang	Village
孔化营	Konghuaying	Village
新华营	Xinhuaying	Village
左所屯	Zuosuotun	Village
北关	Beiguan	Village
西关	Xiguan	Village
小南园	Xiaonanyuan	Village
盛世营	Shengshiying	Village
南关	Nanguan	Village
太平街	Taipingjie	Village
利民街	Liminjie	Village
和平街	Hepingjie	Village
阜民街	Fuminjie	Village
王家山	Wangjiashan	Village
南张庄	Nanzhangzhuang	Village
东灰岭	Dong Huiling	Village
彭家窑	Pengjiayao	Village
西灰岭	Xi Huiling	Village
头司	Tousi	Village
四司	Sisi	Village

== Culture and tourism ==
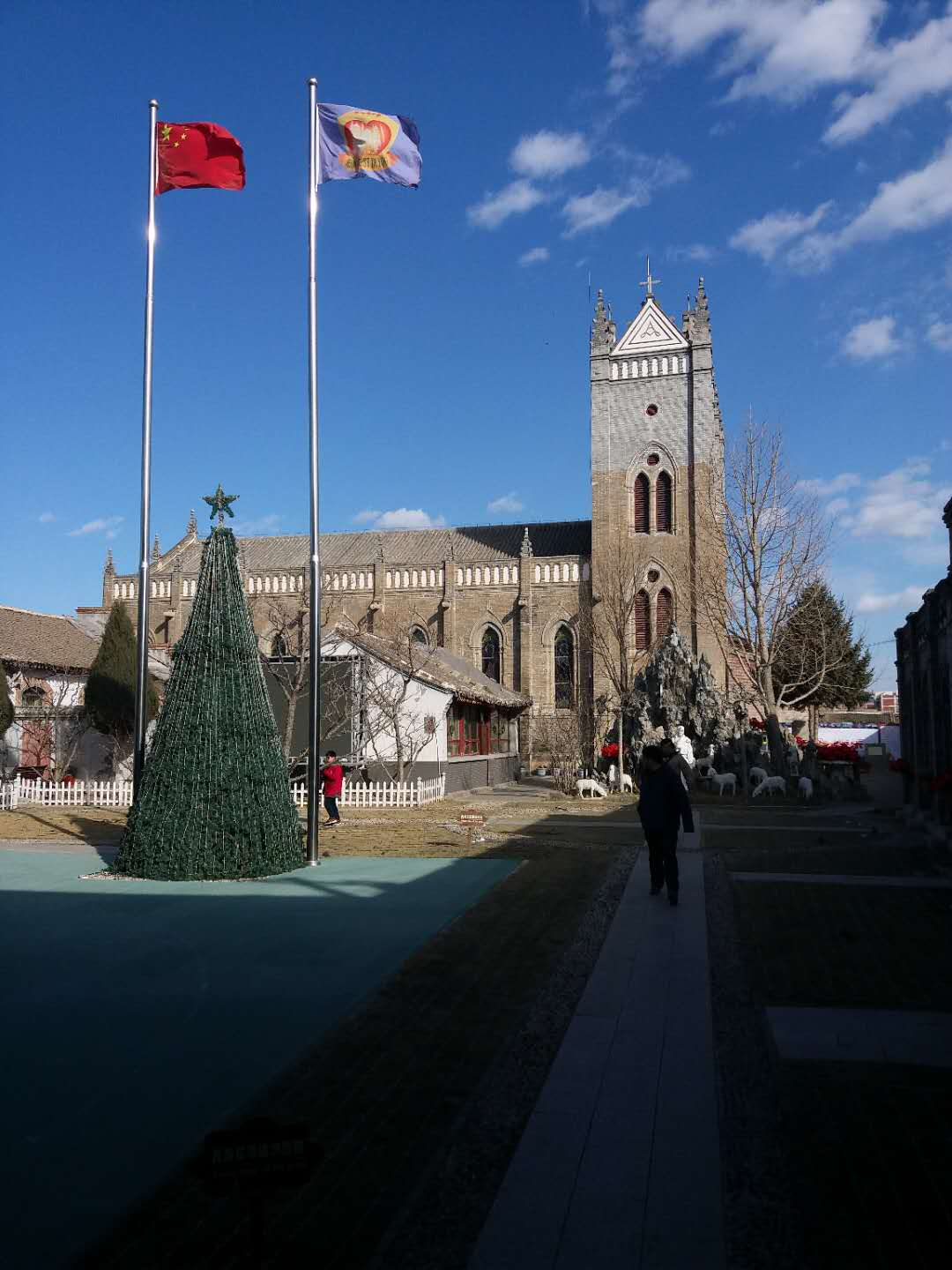
Yongning Catholic Church

The town has benefited from a government initiative in the 2000s to restore some of the glory of its condition during its Ming dynasty height. At the center of the town square is a tower. Yongning Catholic Church, a church tracing back to the Qing dynasty, stands today as a curious Gothic Revival architecture in contrast to the appearance of the rest of the town.

== Gallery ==
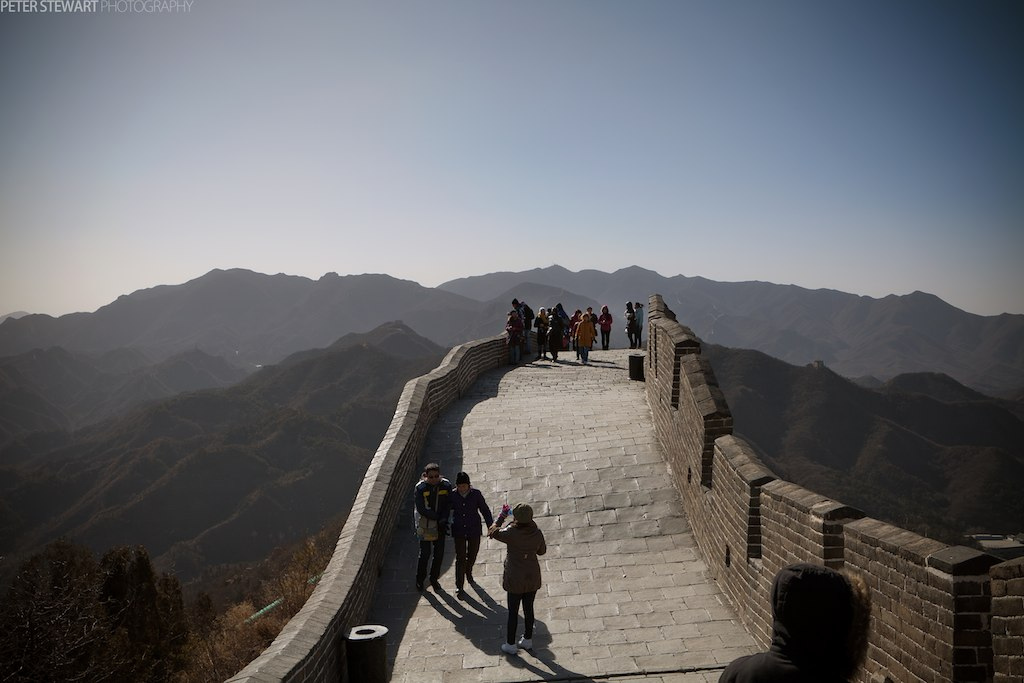
Portion of the Great Wall on the southeast of the town, 2012

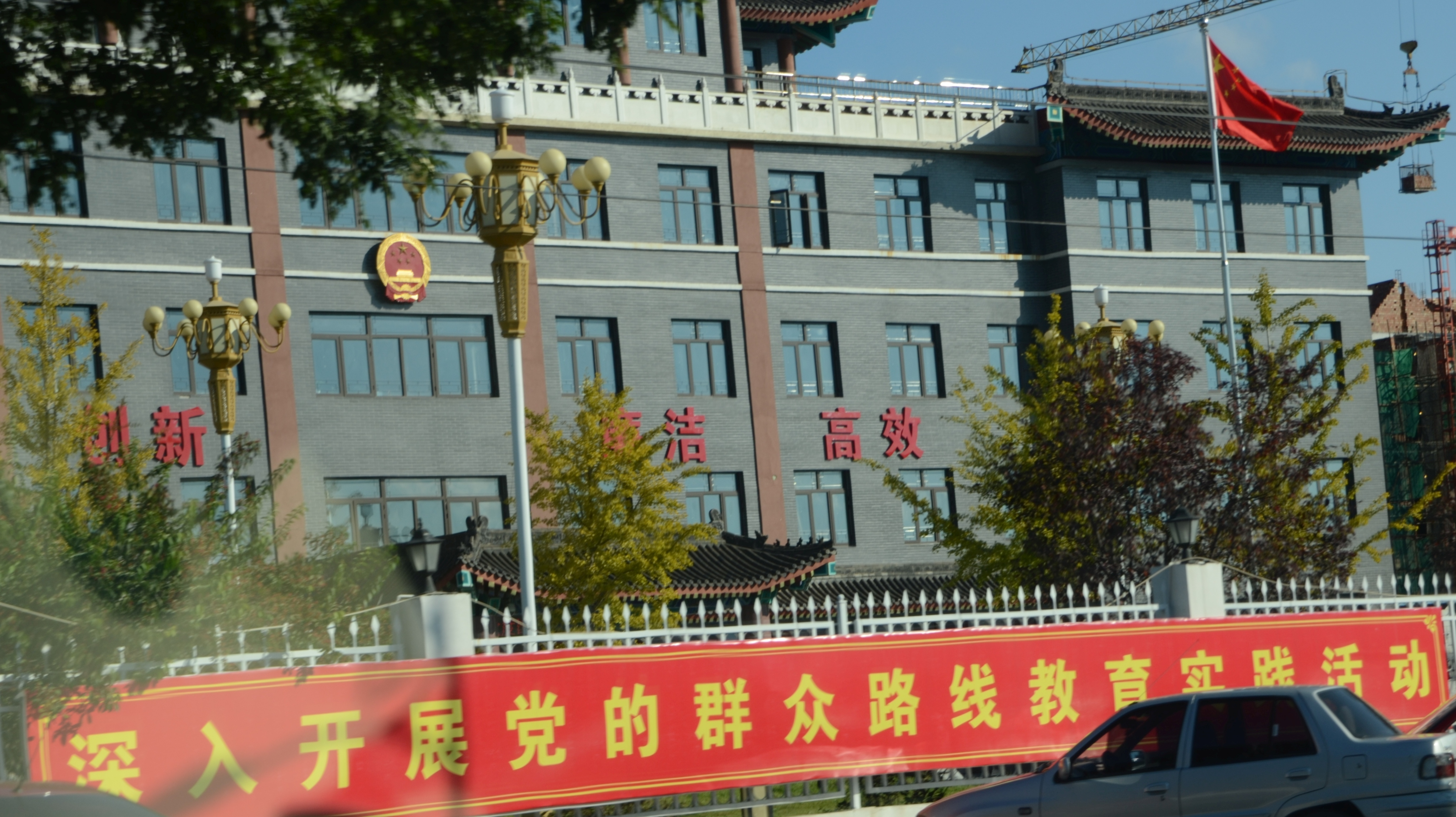
Yongning Town, 2014

== See also ==
- List of township-level divisions of Beijing
