= Linze, Jiangsu =

Linze 临泽镇
- Town
- Location in Jiangsu
- Coordinates: 33.03982°N 119.60336°E
- Country: People's Republic of China
- Province: Jiangsu
- Prefecture-level city: Yangzhou
- County: Gaoyou
- Time zone: UTC+8 (China Standard)

Linze (Chinese: 临泽镇) is a town in Gaoyou, Yangzhou, Jiangsu. As of 2020, it has six residential communities and twenty-two villages under its administration.
