= Tangzhuang, Jiangsu =

Tangzhuang 汤庄镇
- Town
- Location in Jiangsu
- Coordinates: 32°46′09″N 119°44′21″E
- Country: People's Republic of China
- Province: Jiangsu
- Prefecture-level city: Yangzhou
- County: Gaoyou
- Time zone: UTC+8 (China Standard)

Tangzhuang (Chinese: 湯莊鎮) is a town in Gaoyou, Yangzhou, Jiangsu. As of 2020, it has 4 residential communities and 17 villages under its administration.
