= Zhoushan, Jiangsu =

Zhoushan 周山镇
- Town
- Location in Jiangsu
- Coordinates: 32.97335°N 119.5121°E
- Country: People's Republic of China
- Province: Jiangsu
- Prefecture-level city: Yangzhou
- County: Gaoyou
- Time zone: UTC+8 (China Standard)

Zhoushan (Chinese: 周山镇) is a town in Gaoyou, Yangzhou, Jiangsu. As of 2020, it has one residential community and eight villages under its administration.
