= Coast Guard City =

Community of special importance to the U.S. Coast Guard

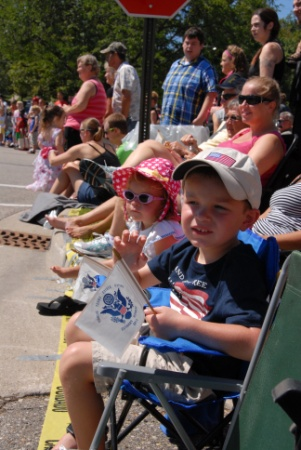
Children wave the flag of the United States Coast Guard during the Grand Haven, Michigan Coast Guard Festival Parade in 2013. In 1998, Grand Haven became the first city designated a "Coast Guard City."

A Coast Guard City is a United States municipality designated as such by the Commandant of the United States Coast Guard on application of the local civilian government. It is an honorary designation intended to recognize communities of special importance to the U.S. Coast Guard. As of December 2025, 37 cities have been designated as "Coast Guard Cities."

== Criteria ==
Designation as a Coast Guard City is made by the Commandant of the United States Coast Guard on advice of a review board and upon application by a municipal government. According to the U.S. Coast Guard, applications are expected to demonstrate an applicant jurisdiction's ability to meet a multi-part criteria that can include: erection of monuments and memorials to the Coast Guard, organization of civic celebrations on the anniversary of the founding of the U.S. Coast Guard, offer of special recognition and merchandise discounts to Coast Guard personnel by the local business community, providing support to local U.S. Coast Guard Morale, Welfare and Recreation initiatives.

Designation as a Coast Guard City is for a five-year period, but can be renewed indefinitely conditioned on the city continuing to meet the criteria.

== History ==
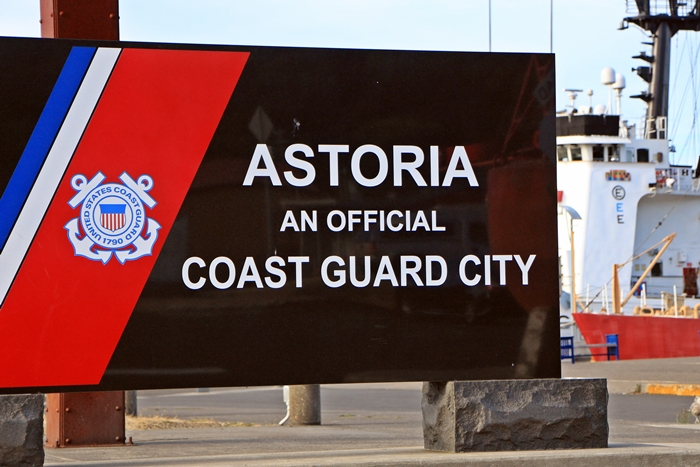
A sign in Astoria, Oregon, designating that city as a "Coast Guard City." Astoria was designated as such on May 1, 2010.

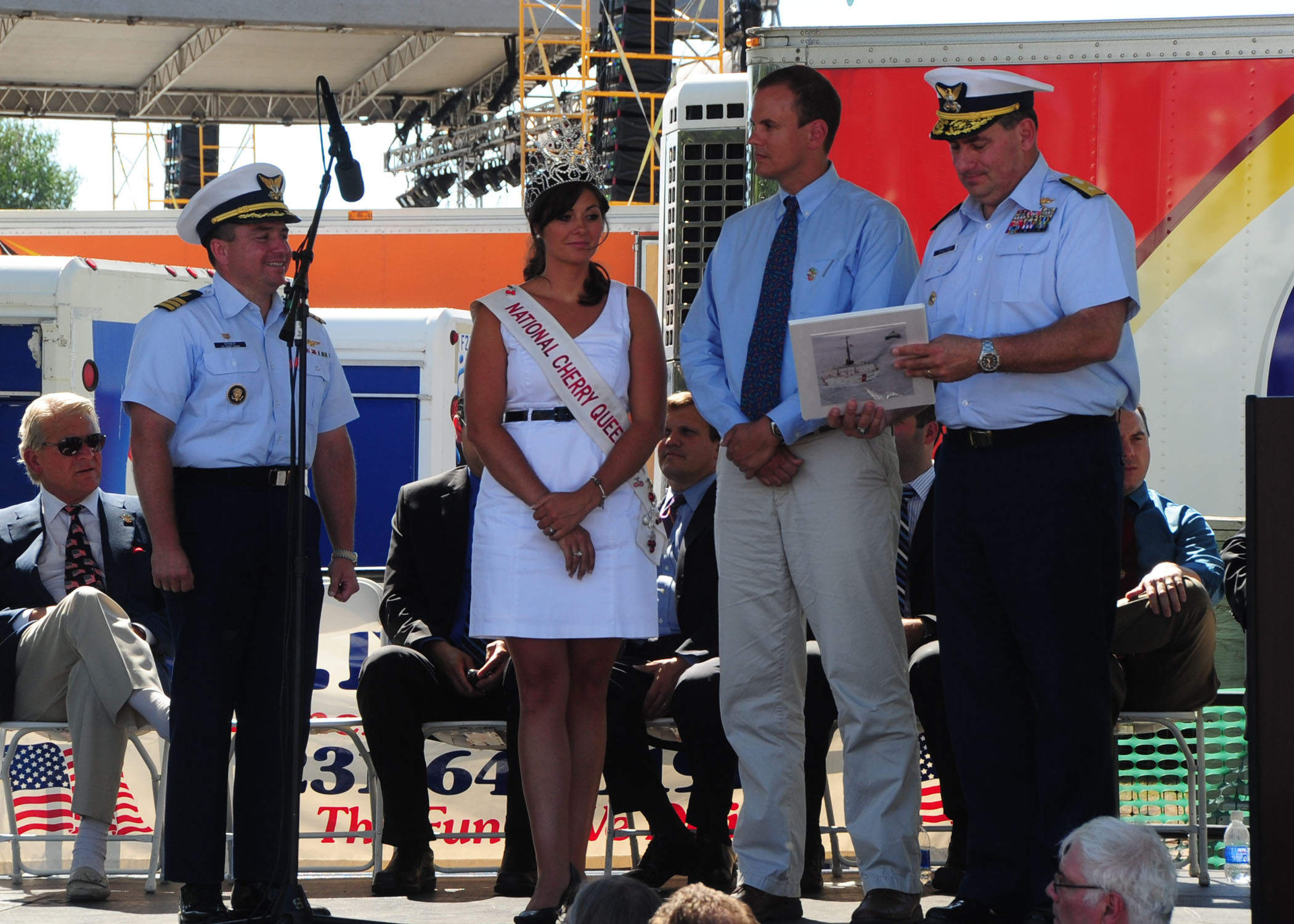
A proclamation ceremony on July 9, 2010, officially designating Traverse City, Michigan, as a "Coast Guard City".

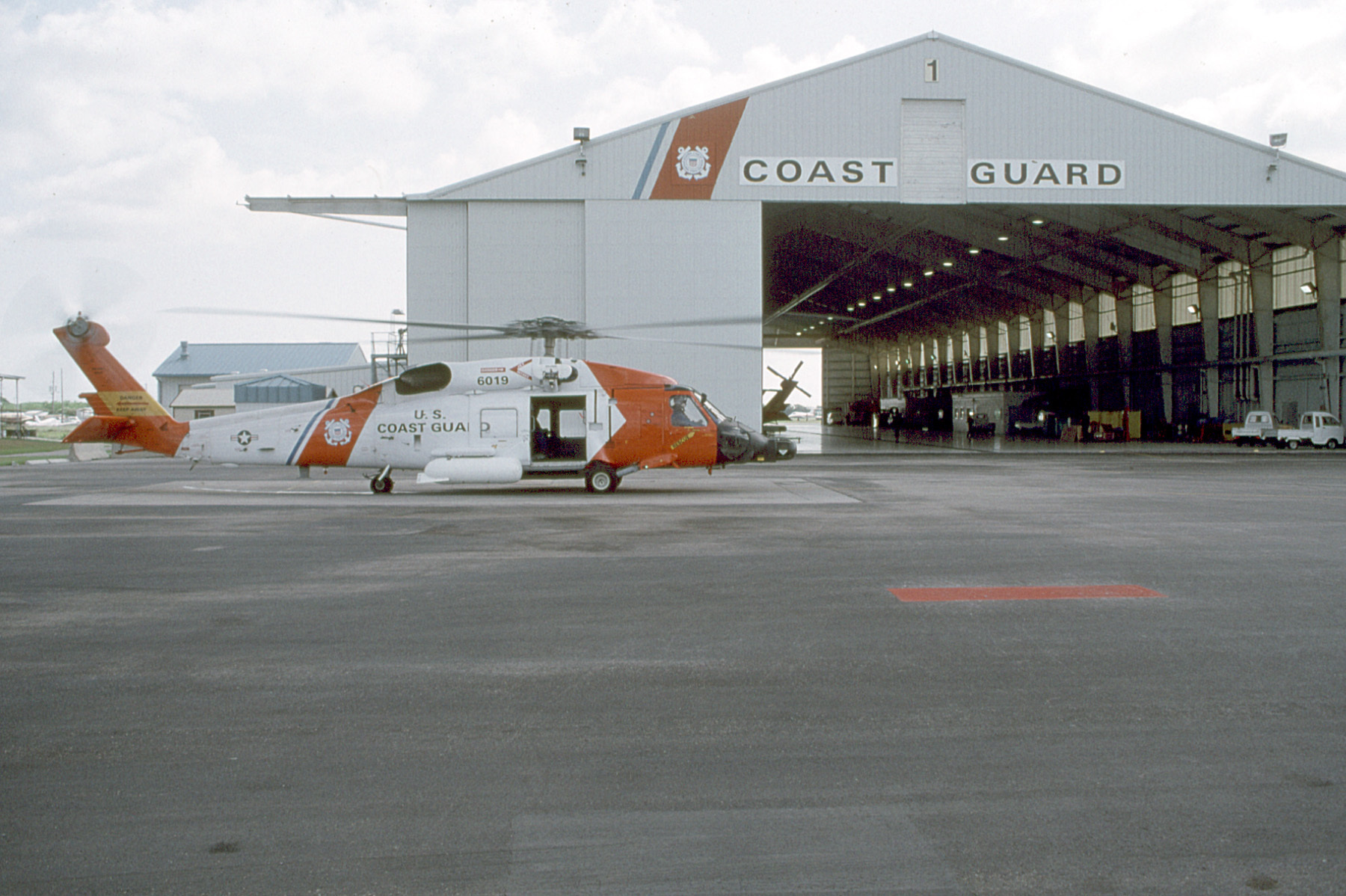
A Sikorsky MH-60 Jayhawk at Coast Guard Air Station Elizabeth City. Elizabeth City, North Carolina, was designated a "Coast Guard City" on May 29, 2015.

=== Background ===
The Coast Guard City program was established by the United States Congress in 1998 to recognize cities where military assets of the United States Coast Guard are located and which demonstrate support to Coast Guard personnel stationed there. The first city so designated was Grand Haven, Michigan.

=== Legislation ===
The authorizing legislation for the Coast Guard City program provides that:

The Commandant of the Coast Guard may recognize the community of Grand Haven, Michigan, as "Coast Guard City, USA". If the Commandant desires to recognize any other community in the same manner or any other community requests such recognition from the Coast Guard, the Commandant shall notify the Committee on Commerce, Science, and Transportation of the Senate and the Committee on Transportation and Infrastructure of the House of Representatives 90 days prior to approving such recognition.

=== List of Coast Guard Cities ===
City name	State	Date designated
Grand Haven	Michigan	November 13, 1998
Eureka	California	June 3, 2000
Mobile	Alabama	July 4, 2002
Wilmington	North Carolina	July 25, 2003
Newport	Oregon	March 28, 2005
Alameda	California	April 14, 2006
Kodiak	Alaska	September 15, 2007
Rockland	Maine	June 16, 2008
Portsmouth	Virginia	November 17, 2009
Traverse City	Michigan	April 7, 2010
Astoria	Oregon	May 1, 2010
Sitka	Alaska	February 14, 2011
Clearwater	Florida	December 23, 2011
Newburyport	Massachusetts	December 23, 2011
Sturgeon Bay	Wisconsin	January 23, 2014
Camden County	Georgia	January 23, 2014
Cape May	New Jersey	May 8, 2015
Elizabeth City	North Carolina	May 29, 2015
New London	Connecticut	May 24, 2015
Carteret County	North Carolina	July 7, 2015
San Diego	California	February 23, 2017
Florence	Oregon	August 16, 2017
New York	New York	February 4, 2018
Chatham County	Georgia	October 18, 2018
Cordova	Alaska	September 30, 2019
Westport	Washington	September 30, 2019
Valdez	Alaska	April 7, 2021
Key West	Florida	August 4, 2022
Bay County	Florida	May 15, 2023
Homer	Alaska	May 22, 2023
Garibaldi	Oregon	December 17, 2023
Charleston	South Carolina	January 26, 2024
Corpus Christi	Texas	April 19, 2025
Juneau	Alaska	April 19, 2025
Petaluma	California	April 19, 2025

== See also ==
- Military town
