= Lingtang Hui Ethnic Township =

Lingtang Hui Ethnic Township 菱塘回族乡
- Ethnic township
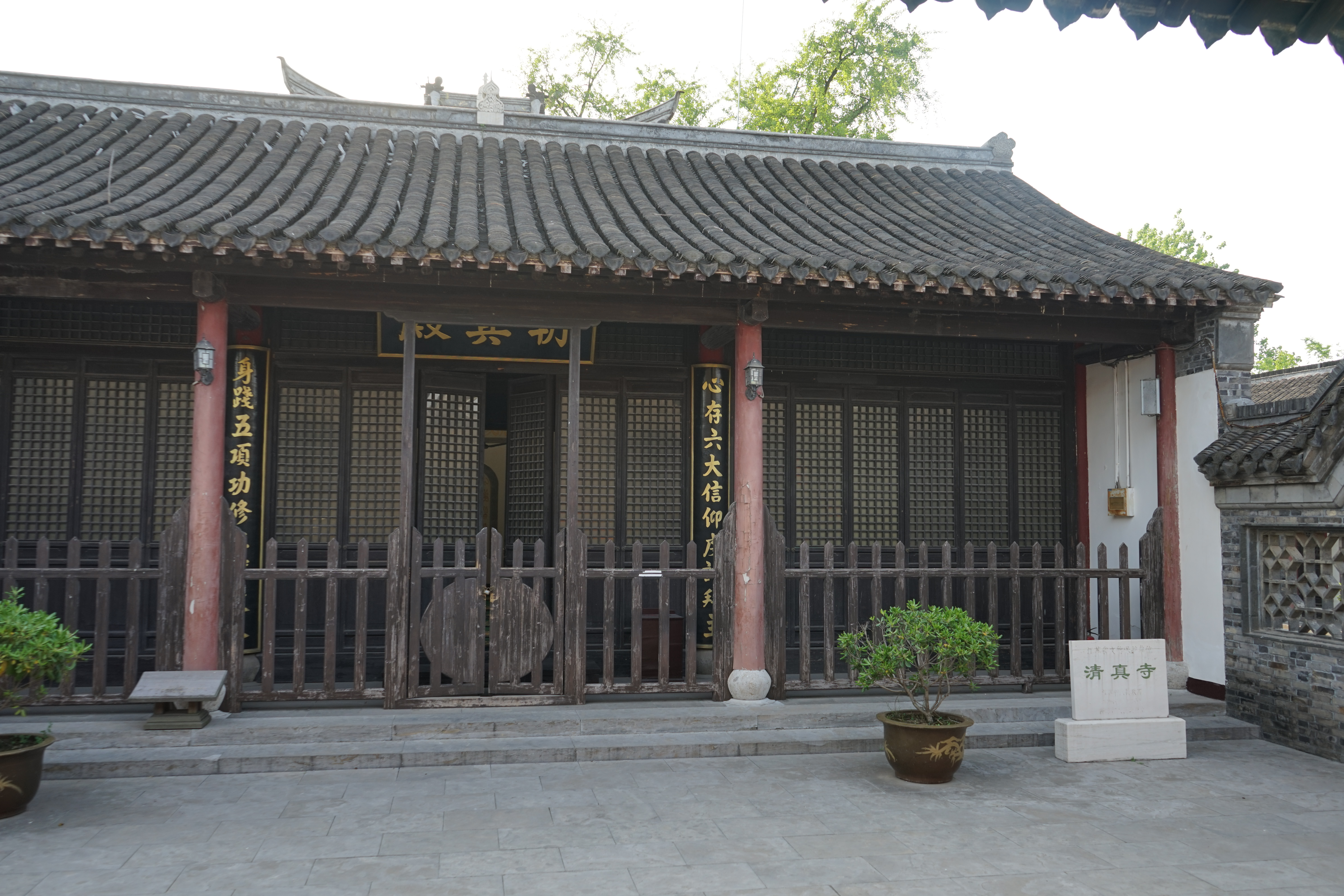
- Mosque in Lingtang

- Location in Jiangsu
- Coordinates: 32.68858°N 119.21924°E
- Country: People's Republic of China
- Province: Jiangsu
- Prefecture-level city: Yangzhou
- County: Gaoyou
- Time zone: UTC+8 (China Standard)

Lingtang Hui Ethnic Township (Chinese: 菱塘回族乡; Xiao'erjing: لٍتْا خُوِذُو ﺷِﯿْﺎ) is an ethnic township in Gaoyou, Yangzhou, Jiangsu. It is the only ethnic township in Jiangsu. As of 2020, it has two residential communities and six villages under its administration.
