= Wang Zengqi =

Chinese writer

- 汪曾祺
- Born: 5 March 1920; Gaoyou, Jiangsu, China
- Died: 16 May 1997 (aged 77); Beijing
- Education: National Southwestern Associated University
- Occupation: Writer
- Spouse: Shi Songqing (Chinese 施松卿)
- Writing career
- Genres: Short story; Essay; Drama; Poetry
- Notable works: The Love Story of a Young Monk, The Tale of the Big Nur
- Notable awards: National Short Fiction Award, 1981, The Tale of the Big Nur

Wang Zengqi (Chinese: 汪曾祺; pinyin: Wāng Zēngqí; 1920 – 1997) was a contemporary Chinese novelist, essayist and Peking Opera playwright. He is known for his short stories and essays with an elegant style and content infused by both traditional literature and folklores of his hometown. He was referred to as a "master stylist of modern Chinese", along with his literary mentor Shen Congwen. He is regarded as a successor of the "Beijing School" heralded by Zhou Zuoren and Shen Congwen in the 1940s.

== Biography ==
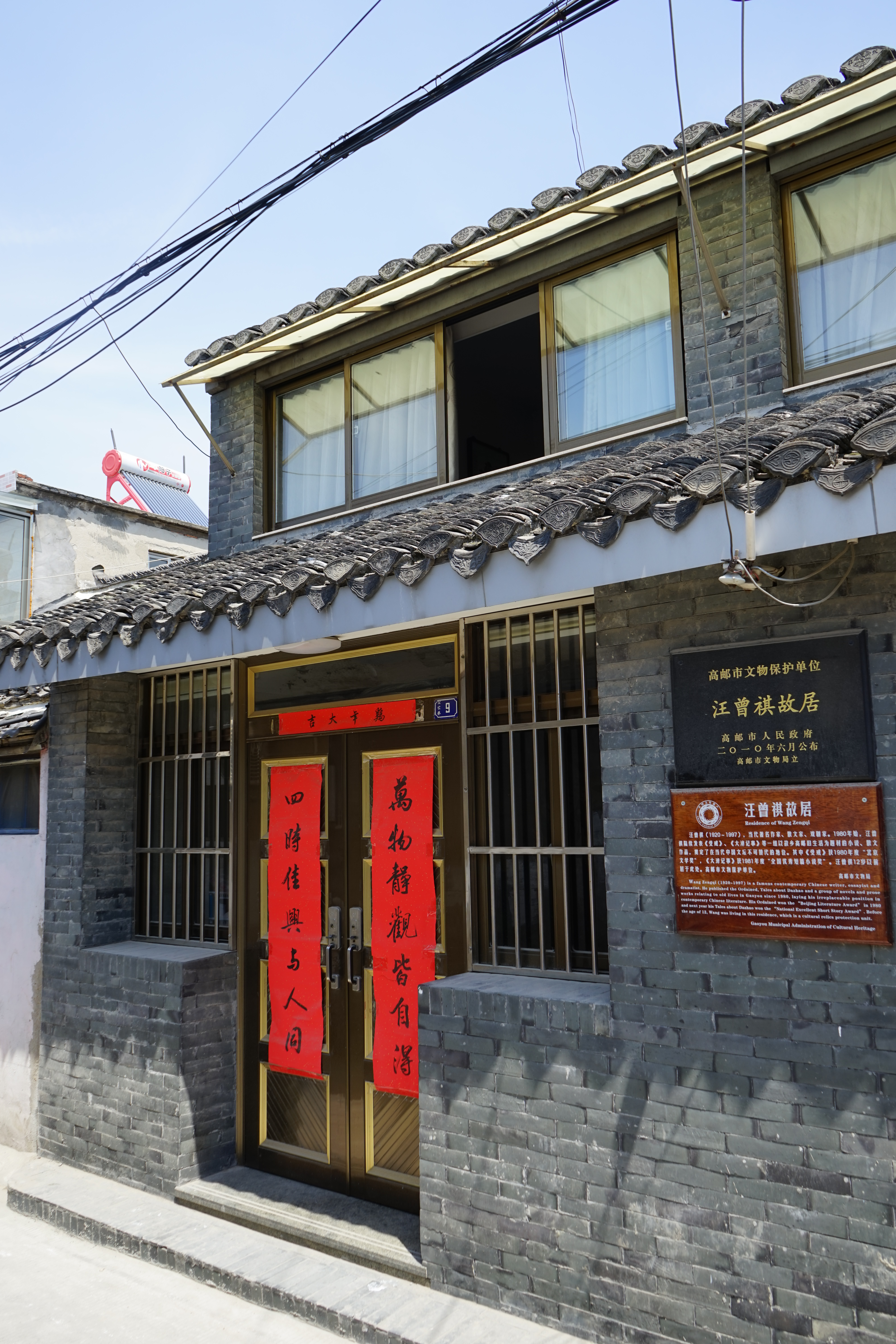
Former Residence of Wang Zengqi in Gaoyou.

Wang was born in a cultured landowner family in 1920 in Gaoyou, Jiangsu province. His grandfather amassed a decent amount of fortune operating farms and pharmacies. Wang's father was a versatile hobbyist, a handyman, and a respected eye doctor by occupation. He was actively engaged in sports, musical instruments, painting, and crafts. Wang Zengqi was the family's second child and first boy. Wang's mother died when he was three, leaving him with only faint memories of her. He was raised with care and affection by his stepmother and other family members. In addition to his formal schooling, he studied calligraphy, painting, and classical literature under the guidance of his grandparents and his father.

In 1939, he enrolled into then National Southwestern Associated University. He took writing classes from Shen Congwen during his university years and started writing in 1940. He finished the first draft of short story "Revenge" (复仇).

He should have graduated in 1943, however, the graduation was postponed to the next year since he failed physical education and English. For unknown reason, he refused to obey the university's arrangement to act as an interpreter for the Flying Tigers in Myanmar, and he didn't receive his university diploma eventually.

Later he became a teacher at a high school in Kunming from 1944 to 1946, where he met his future wife Shi Songqing (施松卿). From 1946 to 1948, he lived in Shanghai as a high school teacher. In the spring of 1948, he moved to Beijing and worked a temporary position at a museum. In early 1949, after Beijing's liberation, he followed the Fourth Field Army to the south as a civil cadre, hoping to gather materials for his writing. He returned to Beijing in 1950 and became a literary editor working along with Zhao Shuli and Lao She. He adapted the story of Fan Jin in Chapter 3 of The Scholars into a Peking opera piece, and gained reputation in the 1950s, it also contributed to his being transferred to Beijing Peking Opera Theater in 1961.

He was targeted at the Anti-Rightist Campaign and was banished to Zhangjiakou until 1962. He suffered the plight again since the Cultural Revolution began. That reversed in 1968, since he was summoned by Jiang Qing to adapt a model opera (yangban xi) Spark amid the Reed, namely Shajiabang.

His literary career did not flourish until the reform and opening-up era of the 1980s. Of his four million words of published work, ninety percent were written in the final eighteen years of his life.

Wang was passionate about food, delighting in the culinary traditions of every place he visited or called home. He enjoyed wandering through open farmers’ markets and took on the role of family chef, spending hours crafting special dishes for families, friends, and guests. This enthusiasm is reflected in his many essays, curated into collections such as Home-cooking Delicacies (家常酒菜), Cooking (做饭), Food of my Hometown (故乡的食物), etc.

Wang and his wife Shi Songqing had one son and two daughters. He was remembered by his elder son Wang Lang as a warm, almost "brotherly" figure who engaged with his children and grand children in a laid-back yet supportive manner—offering guidance but avoiding rigid paternal authority.

Wang died on May 16, 1997, in Beijing. He was buried together with his wife at a public cemetery in Beijing at the foot of the Western Hills.

== Works ==
=== Early career ===
During the Second Sino-Japanese War, Wang studied under several leading scholars—Zhu Ziqing, Wen Yiduo, Feng Youlan, and Shen Congwen—at Southwest Associated University. A fan of Shen Congwen's fiction since high school, he attended Shen's university lectures on fiction writing and regarded him as a lifelong teacher and literary mentor. Wang began publishing poetry and short stories in a student-run campus magazine that he co-founded.

Wang published his first volume of short stories Collection of Chance Encounters (邂逅集, xie hou ji) in 1949, as part of a literary series edited by Ba Jin.

During the following three decades of the Mao era and the Cultural Revolution, he focused his creative energies on politicized model operas heralded by Jiang Qing. He began fiction writing again in 1980, when Deng Xiaoping brought the political and social reforms to remedy the aftermath of the Cultural Revolution.

=== Settings and style ===
During the final quarter of the twentieth century, Wang authored multiple essays and short stories that garnered critical acclaim. His short stories are set in the places where he lived: his hometown of Gaoyou; Kunming, where he attended university; Zhangjiakou, where he underwent re-education as a “rightist”; and Beijing, where he has resided and worked since the 1950s. His characters include urban commoners, lower-class scholars, rural folks, and intellectuals. His narrative favours a natural, prose‑like flow over dramatic plotting, employing plain, restrained language accented with humour and elegance. This approach reflects the legacy of the “Beijing School” of the 1940s led by Zhou Zuoren and Shen Congwen. His works portraying the rural life lyrically stimulated writers of roots-searching literature in the mid and late 1980s.

=== “Buddhist Initiation” ===
Wang's 1980 story "Buddhist Initiation" (受戒) painted a beautiful, poetic, and nostalgic portrait of life before 1949, in sharp contrast to the Mao era literature which generally denounced the evils of China's "feudal" past. Wang's decision to portray Buddhist culture reflected an effort to expand literary topics and his unwillingness to place politics at the centre of his story writing. The story, to Wang's own surprise, was warmly received by readers in mainland China at its publication, and subsequently well accepted by readers and critics alike in Hong Kong and Taiwan, where several critics listed it among the best 100 stories of the past 100 years.

=== Critical studies of themes ===
Lin Jiang and Shi Jie conducted a contextual study of Wang Zengqi's family background, upbringing, and education, linking these to his personality and literary themes. They observed that Wang Zengqi's fiction blends the three great currents of Chinese thought—Confucianism, Daoism and Buddhism—into stories that resonate with everyday experience. His characters often display Confucian virtues of resilience, moral integrity and a deep sense of duty and kindness toward family and community. At the same time, they live according to Daoist principles, finding joy in simple daily activities and remaining unburdened by status or material ambitions. Buddhist themes also surface throughout his work, as figures learn compassion over vengeance, confront the law of karma and cultivate a calm awareness of the present moment. Rooted in his Jiangsu childhood among folk customs and temple life, and inspired by Shen Congwen's warm, lyrical depictions of rural China, Wang's narratives celebrate ordinary people who balance active engagement with the world and serene acceptance of its uncertainties.

=== Literary influence and theory ===
Wang held that language is not merely a form of expression but constitutes the content of literature itself. His understanding of literary language was influenced by traditional Chinese literature, particularly the works of the Eight Great Prose Masters, the Qing dynasty Tongcheng school, and Han Yu. He advocated that accuracy is the sole criterion for literary language and stressed the artistic qualities of Chinese characters, including their sound, tones, and musicality. To enrich literary expression, he promoted integrating classical Chinese, spoken language, dialects, and the concept of "leaving empty spaces (留白)," a technique derived from Chinese painting. His theory on literary language was seen as a reaction to the apparently extreme literary views advanced by Hu Shi and Chen Duxiu during the May Fourth Movement.

== Reception ==
Yang Zao (杨早), a contemporary scholar of history and literature, regarded Wang as a modern‑day Su Dongpo, observing that Wang embodied the wisdom of Confucianism, Buddhism, and Daoism, and maintained an optimistic, humane outlook toward his fellow human beings and his circumstances.

Hong Zicheng (洪子诚), a scholar of contemporary literature history, considers Wang one of "the best authors" of his time. Unlike Ding Ling or Ai Qing whose creative output declined in their later years, Wang maintained a high level of creativity and artistic achievement throughout his career. Hong noted two distinctive qualities of Wang's work. First, his empathetic portrayal of the ordinary rural folk set against vividly rendered local landscape, his stories uncover human warmth and resilience without artifice. Second, his linguistic sensitivity—his prose is plain and measured yet resonant, blending classical allusion, vernacular speech, and folk idioms.

Today, Wang's essays, short stories, poetry, and letters are widely published and read, elevating him to near "Internet celebrity" status. However, he did not enjoy comparable popularity during his lifetime. One critic remarked that Wang's fiction offers lifestyle guidance and emotional support to China's growing urban population, much as 18th-century Romanticism did for Europe's emerging bourgeoisie.

Although Wang is best known among contemporary urban fans for his light‑hearted essays on food, drink, travel, and daily life, he is not, as his eldest son Wang Lang emphasizes, a mere "chicken‑soup writer," since he also tackled social issues and regarded such engagement as a writer's duty.

== Selected works ==
=== Short stories ===
==== Collection of Chance Encounters (邂逅集, xie hou ji), 1949 ====
- "Revenge" (复仇, Fu Chou; 1944)
- "Men Famous for Chicken and Duck" (鸡鸭名家, Jiya mingjia; 1947)
- "Old Lu" (老鲁, Lao Lu; 1945)
- "Artists" (艺术家, Yishujia; 1948)
- "Carpenter Dai" (戴车匠, Dai chejiang; 1947)
- "Down and Out" (落魄, Luopo; 1947)
- "Convicts" (囚犯, Qiufan; 1947)
- "Chance Encounter" (邂逅, Xie hou; 1948)

==== Short stories in the 1980s ====
- "Buddhist Initiation", or "The Love Story of a Young Monk" (受戒, Shoujie), 1980
- "A Tale of Big Nur" (大淖记事, Da Nao Ji Shi), 1981
- "Special Gift" (异秉, yibing), 1981
- "Pi Fengsan the House Stretcher" (皮凤三楦房子, Pi Fengsan xuan fanzi),1982
- "Three Friends Through Adversity" (岁寒三友, Suihan sanyou)
- (Chinese: 云致秋行状)
- (Chinese: 讲用)
- (Chinese: 故里三陈)
- (Chinese: 水蛇腰)
- (Chinese: 徙)
- (Chinese: 羊舍一夕)

== Bibliography ==
- Chang, Kang-i Sun (2010). The Cambridge History of Chinese Literature, Volume II: From 1375. Shanghai: Cambridge University Press. ISBN 978-0-521-85559-4.
- FitzGerald, Carolyn. “Imaginary Sites of Memory: Wang Zengqi and Post-Mao Reconstructions of the Native Land.” Modern Chinese Literature and Culture, vol. 20, no. 1, 2008, pp. 72–128. JSTOR 41490991. Accessed 7 Dec. 2023.
- FitzGerald, Carolyn (2013). "Chapter Three: Wang Zengqi's Collection of Chance Encounters: The Shifting Essence of the Wartime Short Story". Fragmenting Modernisms:Chinese Wartime Literature, Art, and Film, 1937–49. BRILL. doi:10.1163/9789004250994. ISBN 978-90-04-25098-7.
- Hong, Zicheng (2010). 中国当代文学史 (zhong guo dang dai wen xue shi) [History of Contemporary Chinese Literature] (in Chinese). Beijing: Peking University Press. ISBN 978-7-301-15373-4.
- Lin, Ling (2016). "Lyricism as Epic's End: A New Approach to Wang Zengqi's Novels". Frontiers of Literary Studies in China. 10 (4): 674–698 – via Brill Academic Publishers.
- Lu, Jianhua (2019). 草木人生: 汪曾祺传 [Cao mu ren sheng: wang zeng qi zhuan] [A Biography of Wang Zengqi] (in Chinese) (1st ed.). Nan jing. ISBN 978-7-5594-1824-1.
