= Ganduo =

Ganduo 甘垛镇
- Town
- Location in Jiangsu
- Coordinates: 32.87742°N 119.75835°E
- Country: People's Republic of China
- Province: Jiangsu
- Prefecture-level city: Yangzhou
- County: Gaoyou
- Time zone: UTC+8 (China Standard)

Ganduo (Chinese: 甘垛镇) is a town in Gaoyou, Yangzhou, Jiangsu. As of 2020, it has 3 residential communities and 16 villages under its administration.
