= Gaoyou =

Gaoyou 高邮市 Kaoyu
- County-level city
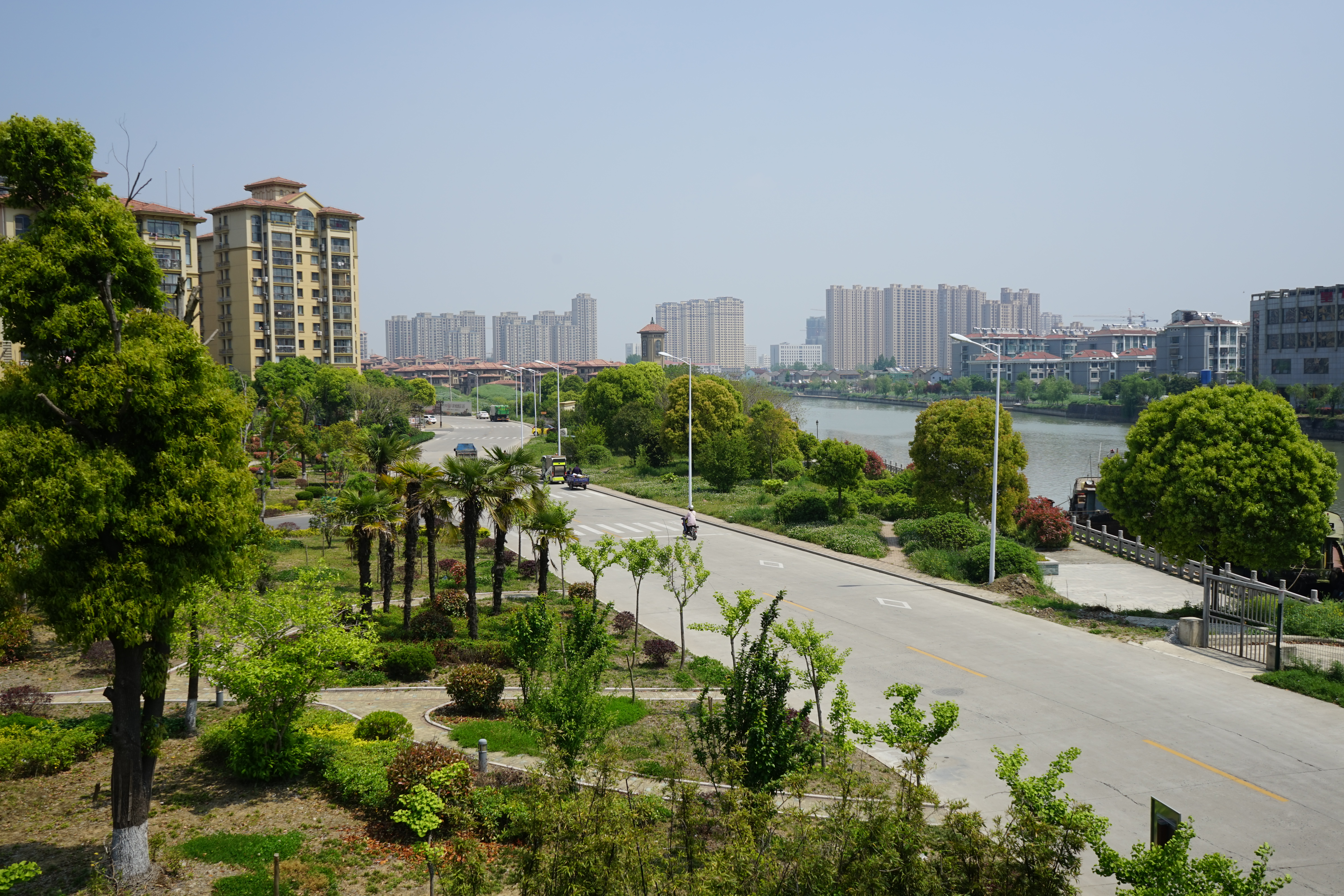
- A view of Gaoyou urban area north of Haichao Bridge

- Location in Jiangsu Gaoyou (China)
- Coordinates: 32°50′42″N 119°30′29″E
- Country: People's Republic of China
- Province: Jiangsu
- Prefecture-level city: Yangzhou

Area
  - County-level city: 1,963 km^{2} (758 sq mi)
  - Water: 788 km^{2} (304 sq mi)
  - Urban (2018): 39 km^{2} (15 sq mi)

Population (2019)
  - County-level city: 820,600
  - Density: 418.0/km^{2} (1,083/sq mi)
  - Urban (2018): 240,000
  - Urban density: 6,200/km^{2} (16,000/sq mi)
- Time zone: UTC+8 (China Standard)
- Postal code: 225600
- Area code: 0514

Gaoyou (simplified Chinese: 高邮; traditional Chinese: 高郵; pinyin: Gāoyóu) is a county-level city under the administration of Yangzhou, Jiangsu province, China, located in the Yangtze River Delta on the north side of the Yangtze River.

== History ==
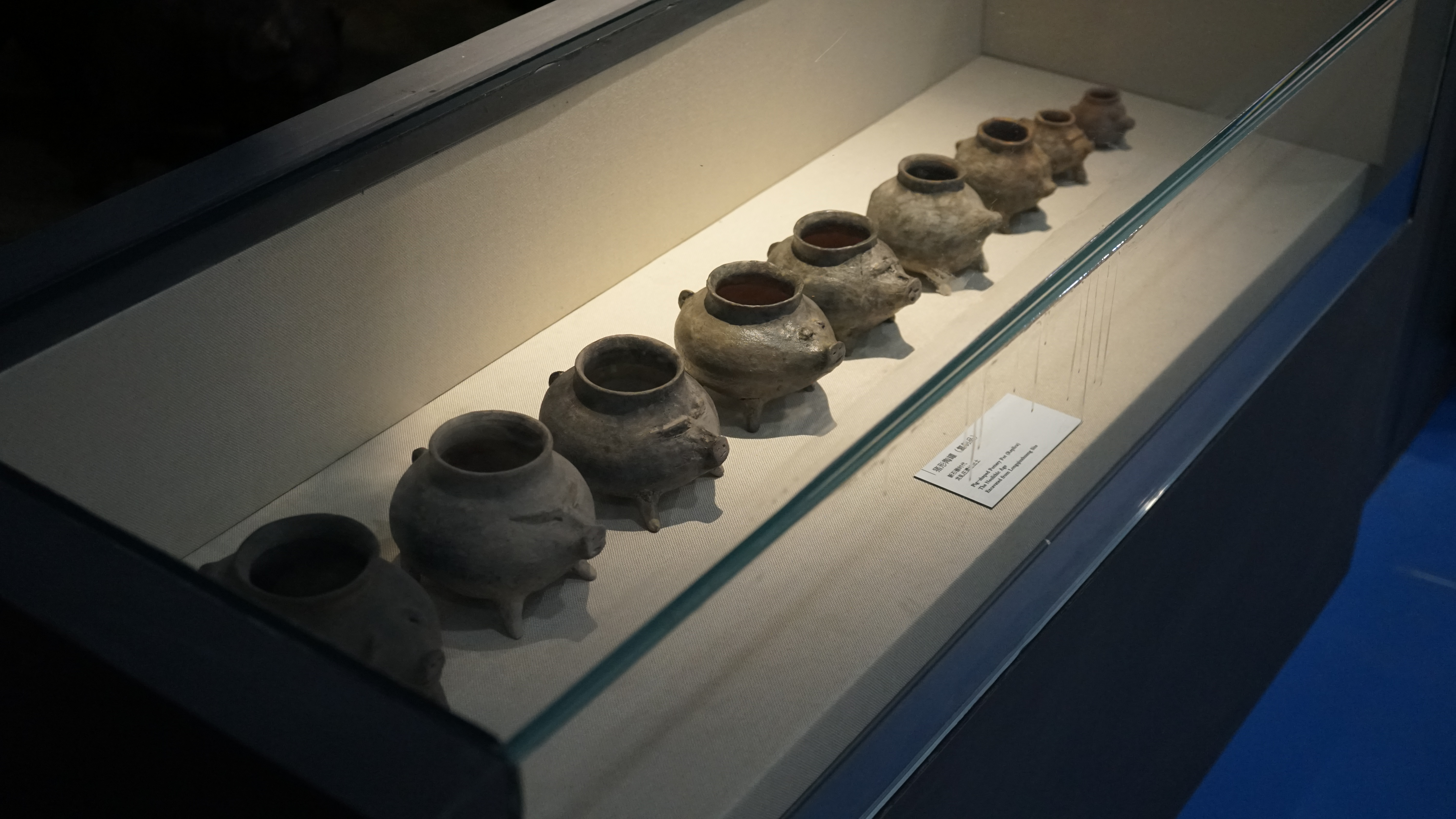
Pig-shaped Pottery Pots excavated from Longqiuzhuang Site

Recent archaeological finds at the Longqiuzhuang site in Gaoyou has found evidence of rice growing dating back 5,500-7,000 years. Gaoyou ting (commune, 亭) located in this area was established in Qin dynasty. Then Gaoyou county whose seat was the former commune was established in BC 118.

In 1353, Zhang Shicheng revolted and captured the walled city of Gaoyou. In the next year, Zhang established Kingdom of Dazhou, while Gaoyou functioned as its temporary capital until 1356. Later, the city withstood the siege led by Toqto'a, since the complicated politics severely reduced the cohesion of the Yuan army. At that time, it was one of the 46 important mail posts along the Grand Canal between Beijing and Nanjing. It was in use until the 1911 Revolution.

On 2 October 1939, the Japanese army captured the walled city. Three months after Japan's unconditional surrender on August 15, 1945, Gaoyou Japanese and fake troops, surrounded by the military and civilians in the liberated areas, resisted and refused to lay down their arms. At this time, there were two brigades and one artillery squadron of the 90th Independent Mixed Brigade of the Japanese Army stationed in Gaoyou city, with more than 1,100 men, as well as the 42nd Division of the False Second Front Army and the False County Security Brigade and Police Brigade with more than 5,000 men. In order to crush the plot of the Kuomintang army to collude with the Japanese and fake troops in Gaoyou to divide and attack the Central China Liberation Area, the Central Military Commission agreed on December 5 to launch the Battle of Gaoyou and seize Gaoyou City. The Battle of Gaoyou destroyed more than 1,100 Japanese troops, including 892 prisoners; destroyed more than 4,000 pseudo-army, including 3,493 prisoners; captured more than 80 artillery pieces and 6,000 guns. The Battle of Gaoyou was the last battle of the New Fourth Army against the Japanese invasion of China, and the last battle against the Japanese in Central China, ending with the surrender of the Japanese and the complete victory of the New Fourth Army. On 19 January 1949, the CPC controlled the walled city. The former site where the invading Japanese army surrendered to the New Fourth Army has been announced by the State Council as the second batch of 100 national anti-war memorial facilities and sites.

The history and culture of Gaoyou fostered Qin Shaoyou, the poet in the Song dynasty, Wang Nianshun and Wang Yinzhi (father and son), the classics interpreters in the Qing dynasty, Sun Yunzhu, the modern paleontologist and Wang Zengqi, the contemporary writer. Gaoyou is also the hometown of Wu Sangui.

A total of about 200,000 people drowned in their sleep in Gaoyou alone due to the devastating flooding of 1931. Gaoyou was the most badly affected place during the floods.

More than 30,000 people starved to death in Gaoyou county during the great famine, of which more than 10,000 were children.

== Administration divisions ==
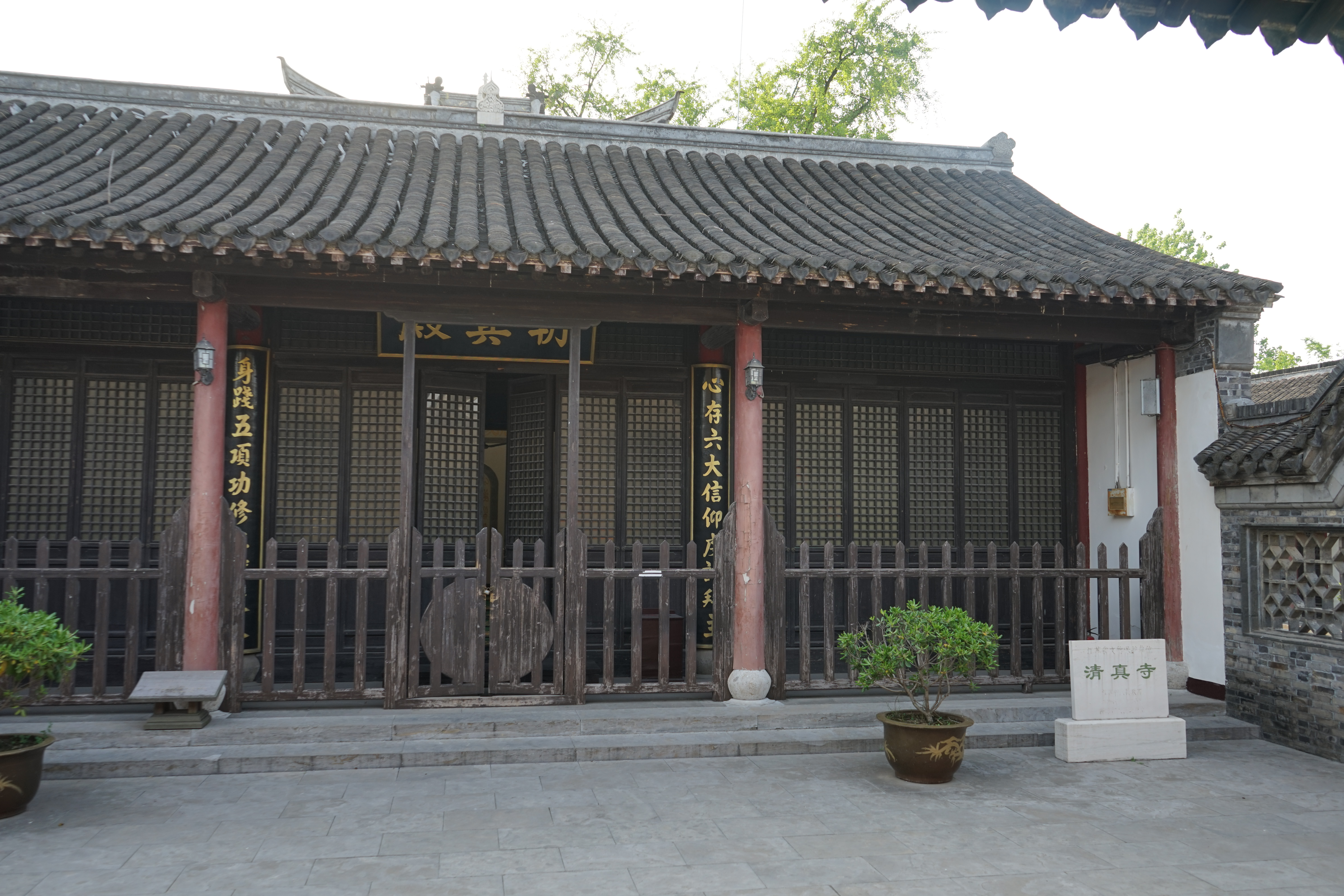
Worship Hall of the ancient mosque at Lingtang

At present, Gaoyou City has 2 subdistricts, 10 towns and 1 ethnic township.

2 Subdistricts

- Gaoyou Subdistrict (高邮) - is upgraded from town.
- Mapeng Subdistrict (马棚) - is upgraded from town.

10 Towns

- Cheluo (车逻)
- Ganduo (甘垛)
- Jieshou (界首)
- Linze (临泽)
- Longqiu (龙虬)
- Sanduo (三垛)
- Songqiao (送桥)
- Tangzhuang (汤庄)
- Xiejia (卸甲)
- Zhoushan (周山)

7 Former Towns

- Baqiao (八桥镇)
- Hanliu (汉留镇)
- Situ (司徒镇)
- Hengjing (横泾镇)
- Zhouxiang (周巷镇)
- Guoji (郭集镇)
- Tianshan (天山镇)

1 Ethnic Township

- Lingtang Hui Township (菱塘回族乡)

The sole ethnic township of Jiangsu, Lingtang Hui Ethnic township, is under the jurisdiction of Gaoyou, about a third of the township residents are Hui Chinese.

== Geography and Climate ==
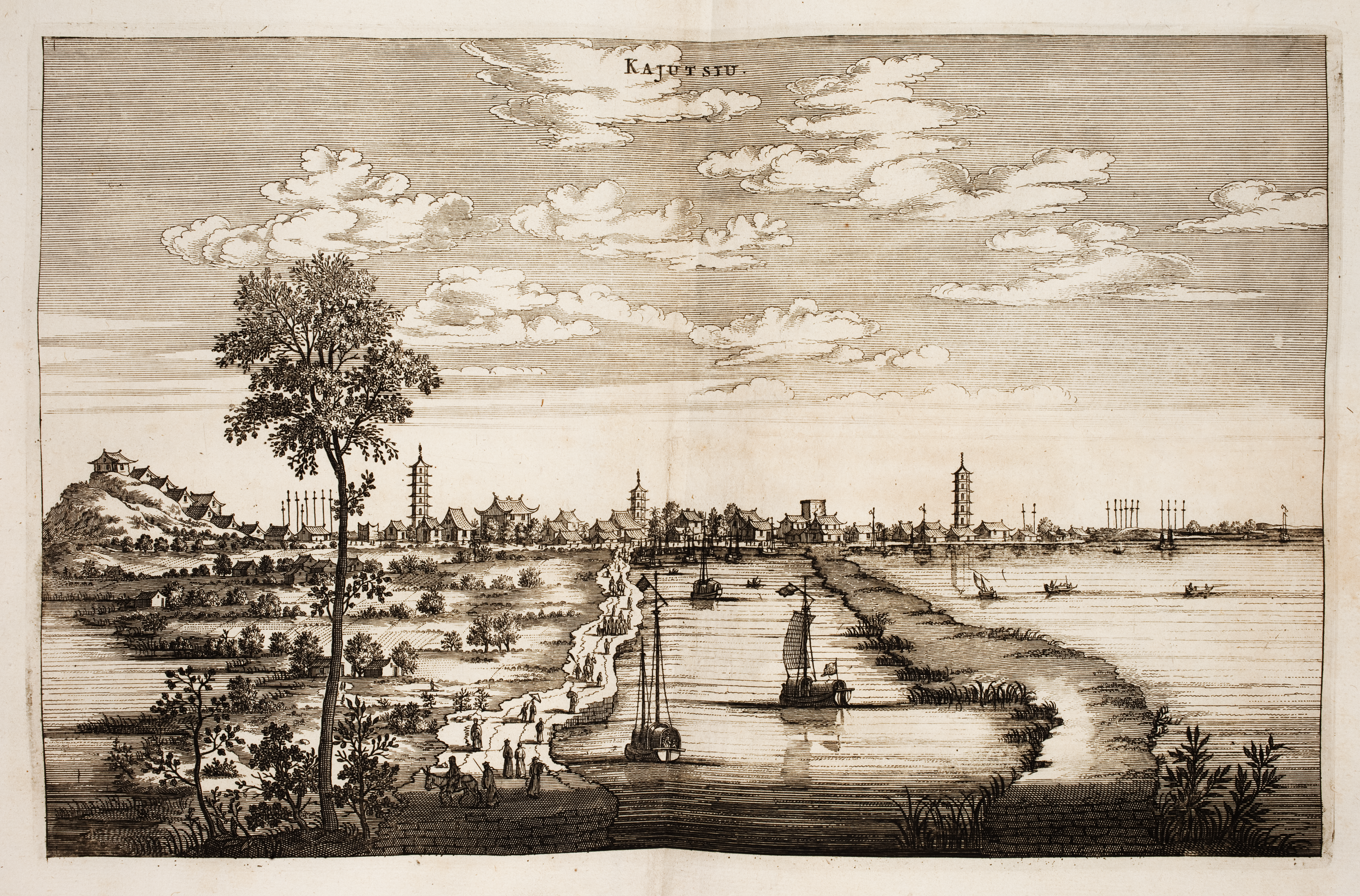
Gaoyou. Nieuhof, L'ambassade de la Compagnie Orientale des Provinces Unies vers l'Empereur de la Chine, 1665.

The name of Gaoyou comes from the building of Gaotai and Posting Pavilion during the reign of King Yingzheng of Qin dynasty. It is adjacent to Yangzhou in the south, to the Huai River in the north, to the canal and Gaoyou Lake in the west, and to the water network of the Lixia River in the east, and is a military town on the canal line and the gateway to the two Huai River.

Now, Gaoyou is located in the central part of Jiangsu Province, which is also part of Yangtze River Delta. It borders Baoying and Jinhu to the north, Jiangdu to the south and Xinghua to east. There are over twenty townships, Lingtang Hui Ethnic Township is the only Minority Township in the province. The population in this county is approximately eighty-three thousand. The total area is 1963 square kilometres with 1175 square kilometres of land area and 788 square kilometres of water surface area. Gaoyou is a plain region which full of rivers and lakes. Gaoyou Lake is the third largest lake in Jiangsu, which closes to The Grand Canal from Beijing to Hangzhou. Geographical location provides important water resources and rich aquatic products for this county.

Gaoyou is located at 32.79 degrees north latitude and 119.44 degrees east longitude. It belongs to the subtropical monsoon climate. The hottest in July is around 27.6 °C (81.7 °F) while the coldest in January is about 1.7 °C (35.1 °F). The average annual temperature is 15.0 °C (59.0 °F). The wet-season is from mid June to July and the average annual rainfall is about 1,000 mm (39 in). The average annual relative humidity is 67%, at the meantime, the frost-free season is more than 200 days. Gaoyou has the characteristics of mild climate, adequate rainfall, four distinctive seasons, sufficient sunshine and long frost free period. Unfortunately, Jiangsu province and Gaoyou in particular is China's "tornado hometown" and its climate and environment make the area highly susceptible to tornadoes such as an EF4 in 2016.

Climate data for Gaoyou, elevation 7 m (23 ft), (1991–2020 normals, extremes 1981–present)
Month	Jan	Feb	Mar	Apr	May	Jun	Jul	Aug	Sep	Oct	Nov	Dec	Year
Record high °C (°F)	20.5 (68.9)	26.5 (79.7)	33.5 (92.3)	33.4 (92.1)	35.6 (96.1)	36.6 (97.9)	37.9 (100.2)	40.0 (104.0)	36.1 (97.0)	32.6 (90.7)	27.6 (81.7)	21.7 (71.1)	40.0 (104.0)
Mean daily maximum °C (°F)	6.5 (43.7)	9.2 (48.6)	14.2 (57.6)	20.7 (69.3)	26.0 (78.8)	29.1 (84.4)	31.8 (89.2)	31.3 (88.3)	27.4 (81.3)	22.3 (72.1)	15.8 (60.4)	9.0 (48.2)	20.3 (68.5)
Daily mean °C (°F)	2.6 (36.7)	4.8 (40.6)	9.4 (48.9)	15.5 (59.9)	21.0 (69.8)	24.8 (76.6)	28.1 (82.6)	27.5 (81.5)	23.3 (73.9)	17.8 (64.0)	11.3 (52.3)	4.9 (40.8)	15.9 (60.6)
Mean daily minimum °C (°F)	−0.4 (31.3)	1.4 (34.5)	5.5 (41.9)	11.1 (52.0)	16.7 (62.1)	21.2 (70.2)	25.0 (77.0)	24.6 (76.3)	20.1 (68.2)	14.2 (57.6)	7.8 (46.0)	1.7 (35.1)	12.4 (54.4)
Record low °C (°F)	−10.7 (12.7)	−10.1 (13.8)	−6.3 (20.7)	−0.7 (30.7)	5.6 (42.1)	11.5 (52.7)	16.8 (62.2)	17.4 (63.3)	10.2 (50.4)	1.3 (34.3)	−5.2 (22.6)	−10.3 (13.5)	−10.7 (12.7)
Average precipitation mm (inches)	41.5 (1.63)	40.4 (1.59)	65.0 (2.56)	59.1 (2.33)	80.4 (3.17)	151.4 (5.96)	223.4 (8.80)	182.3 (7.18)	79.2 (3.12)	53.8 (2.12)	50.0 (1.97)	32.9 (1.30)	1,059.4 (41.73)
Average precipitation days (≥ 0.1 mm)	7.9	8.4	9.1	8.5	9.5	10.0	13.2	11.8	8.0	6.6	7.4	6.3	106.7
Average snowy days	3.7	3.0	1.2	0.1	0	0	0	0	0	0	0.5	1.2	9.7
Average relative humidity (%)	72	72	70	68	69	74	79	80	78	73	73	71	73
Mean monthly sunshine hours	142.2	139.3	172.3	196.9	202.9	163.4	190.2	202.4	176.3	180.9	154.3	152.4	2,073.5
Percentage possible sunshine	45	44	46	50	47	38	44	49	48	52	50	49	47
Source: China Meteorological Administration all-time extreme temperature

== Economy ==
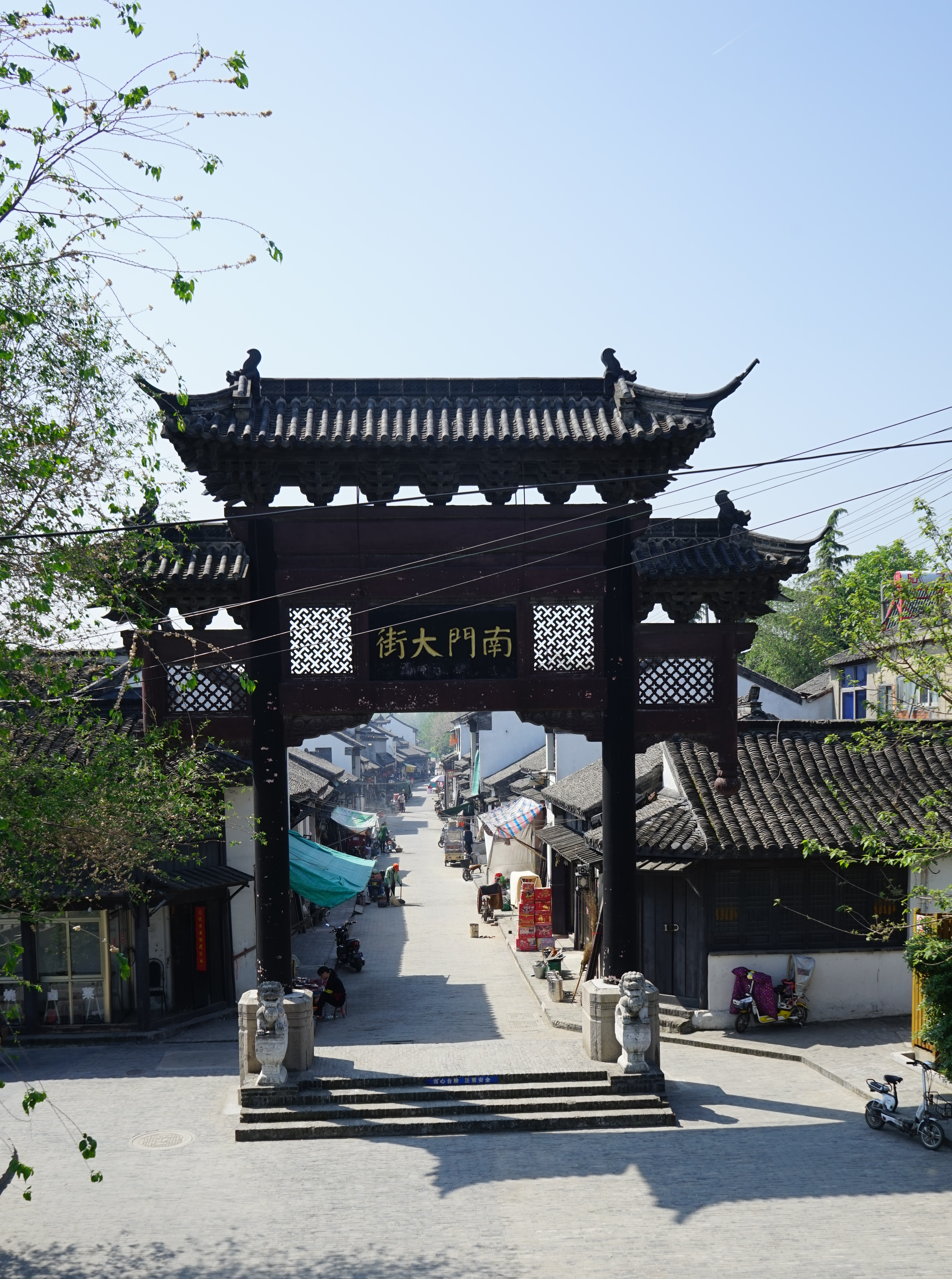
South Gate Avenue, served as the most bustling commercial district of the city during the Ming and Qing Dynasties.

Gaoyou was dependent on its agriculture and aquaculture sections financially. Primary agricultural products include rapeseed, rice, wheat, poultry and eggs. A variety of aquatic products contain fish, crab and shrimp. The environment in this county has been well protected by the government. The local government has closed many factories in order to protect the lakes.

== Food ==
Gaoyou is famous for its salted duck eggs.

== Transport ==
=== Roads ===
==== Expressways ====
- G2 Beijing–Shanghai Expressway. It passes just to the east of the city.

==== National Highway ====
- China National Highway 233

=== Railway ===
The city is served by Gaoyou railway station and Gaoyou North railway station (located at Jieshou) on the Lianyungang–Zhenjiang high-speed railway.
