= Songqiao =

Songqiao 送桥镇
- Town
- Location in Jiangsu Songqiao (China)
- Coordinates: 32°38′29″N 119°18′17″E
- Country: People's Republic of China
- Province: Jiangsu
- Prefecture-level city: Yangzhou
- County: Gaoyou
- Time zone: UTC+8 (China Standard)

Songqiao (Chinese: 送桥镇) is a town in Gaoyou, Yangzhou, Jiangsu. As of 2020, it has 4 residential communities and 15 villages under its administration.
