= Xiejia =

Xiejia 卸甲镇
- Town
- Location in Jiangsu
- Coordinates: 32.75413°N 119.58945°E
- Country: People's Republic of China
- Province: Jiangsu
- Prefecture-level city: Yangzhou
- County: Gaoyou
- Time zone: UTC+8 (China Standard)

Xiejia (Chinese: 卸甲镇) is a town in Gaoyou, Yangzhou, Jiangsu. As of 2020, it has four residential communities and seventeen villages under its administration.
