= Cheluo =

Cheluo 车逻镇
- Town
- Location in Jiangsu
- Coordinates: 32.71501°N 119.44839°E
- Country: People's Republic of China
- Province: Jiangsu
- Prefecture-level city: Yangzhou
- County: Gaoyou
- Time zone: UTC+8 (China Standard)

Cheluo (Chinese: 车逻镇) is a town in Gaoyou, Yangzhou, Jiangsu. As of 2020, it has 2 residential communities and 11 villages under its administration.
