= Longqiu =

Longqiu 龙虬镇
- Town
- Location in Jiangsu
- Coordinates: 32.82884°N 119.50918°E
- Country: People's Republic of China
- Province: Jiangsu
- Prefecture-level city: Yangzhou
- County: Gaoyou
- Time zone: UTC+8 (China Standard)

Longqiu (Chinese: 龙虬镇) is a town in Gaoyou, Yangzhou, Jiangsu. As of 2020, it has two residential communities and eleven villages under its administration.
