= List of modern military towns =

For military towns of specific type, see Military town

This is a list of populated places informally called military towns, garrison towns, or military cities, i.e., populated places closely associated with a military installation, such as a military base or military academy.

== Canada ==
- Trenton, Ontario (associated with CFB Trenton)
- Kingston, Ontario (associated with CFB Kingston and the Royal Military College of Canada)
- Petawawa, Ontario (associated with Garrison Petawawa)
- Borden, Ontario (associated with CFB Borden)

== United Kingdom ==
- Aldershot (associated with the Aldershot Garrison)
- Dunoon was a garrison town for the U.S. Navy Holy Loch base during Cold War
- Brecon (associated with Derring Lines and The Barracks)
- Catterick Garrison (the largest British Army garrison in the world)
- Woolwich Garrison

== United States ==
- Abilene, Texas (associated with Dyess Air Force Base)
- Alamogordo, New Mexico (associated with Holloman Air Force Base)
- Anchorage (Joint Base Elmendorf-Richardson (JBER) (Air Force, Army, Navy); USCG Sector Anchorage)
- Biloxi, Mississippi (associated with Keesler Air Force Base)
- Bremerton, Washington (associated with Puget Sound Naval Shipyard and Naval Submarine Base Bangor)
- Charleston, SC (Navy Weapons Station Charleston; Coast Guard Station Charleston; Joint Base Charleston (Air Force, Army, Navy)
- Clovis, New Mexico (dependent upon with Cannon Air Force Base)
- Colorado Springs, Colorado (associated with Fort Carson, Peterson Space Force Base, Schriever Space Force Base, Air Force Academy, NORAD)
- Columbus, Georgia (dependent upon Fort Benning)
- Columbus, Mississippi (dependent upon Columbus Air Force Base)
- Dayton, Ohio (dependent upon Wright-Patterson Air Force Base)
- Fairbanks, Alaska (Fort Wainwright, Eielson Air Force Base, Fort Greely and Clear Air Force Station)
- Fayetteville, North Carolina (associated with Fort Bragg and Pope Army Air Field)
- Fort Walton Beach, Florida (associated with Eglin Air Force Base)
- Havelock, North Carolina (associated with MCAS Cherry Point)
- Hinesville, Georgia (dependent upon Fort Stewart)
- Honolulu ( Joint Base Pearl Harbor-Hickham, Bellows Air Force Station, and Fort Shafter, etc.)
- Hopkinsville, Kentucky (associated with Fort Campbell)
- Jacksonville, Florida (associated with NAS Jacksonville and Naval Station Mayport; also within proximity of Naval Submarine Base Kings Bay)
- Jacksonville, North Carolina (associated with Camp Lejeune)
- Junction City, Kansas (associated with Ft. Riley)
- Killeen, Texas (associated with Fort Hood)
- Knob Noster, Missouri (dependent upon with Whiteman Air Force Base)
- Lawton, Oklahoma (dependent upon Fort Sill)
- Leavenworth, Kansas (associated with Fort Leavenworth)
- Lompoc, California (associated with Vandenberg Space Force Base)
- Minot, North Dakota (dependent upon with Minot Air Force Base)
- Monterey, CA (Naval Postgraduate School Monterey (Navy, Marine Corps, Coast Guard, Air Force); Defense Language Institute (Army))
- Norfolk, Virginia (associated with Naval Station Norfolk)
- Oceanside, California (associated with Marine Corps Base Camp Pendleton)
- Pensacola, Florida (associated with Naval Air Station Pensacola, Coast Guard Station Pensacola)
- San Antonio, Texas (associated with Joint Base San Antonio)
- San Diego, California (associated with Naval Base San Diego, Marine Corps Air Station Miramar, Marine Corps Recruit Depot San Diego, Naval Base Point Loma, Bob Wilson Naval Hospital, the Space and Naval Warfare Systems Center San Diego, Space and Naval Warfare Systems Command, and Coast Guard Air Station San Diego)
- Sierra Vista, Arizona (dependent upon with Fort Huachuca).
- St. Robert, Missouri (dependent upon with Fort Leonard Wood)
- Tacoma, Washington (associated with Joint Base Lewis–McChord)
- Tucson, Arizona (associated with Davis–Monthan Air Force Base)
- Virginia Beach (Naval Air Station Oceana; Fort Story)
- Warner Robins, Georgia (dependent upon Robins Air Force Base)
- Washington DC (Washington Navy Yard, Bolling Air Force Base, and Fort Lesley J. McNair, etc.)
- Wichita Falls, Texas (dependent upon Sheppard Air Force Base)
- Westworth Village, Texas (Naval Air Station Joint Reserve Base Fort Worth)

== See also ==
- College town
- Closed city
