= Sanduo, Jiangsu =

Sanduo 三垛镇
- Town
- Location in Jiangsu
- Coordinates: 32.81727°N 119.65973°E
- Country: People's Republic of China
- Province: Jiangsu
- Prefecture-level city: Yangzhou
- County: Gaoyou
- Time zone: UTC+8 (China Standard)

Sanduo (Chinese: 三垛镇) is a town in Gaoyou, Yangzhou, Jiangsu. As of 2020, it has four residential communities and twenty-one villages under its administration.
