= Military town (China) =

In the history of ancient China, military towns of various grades were important elements of the defense system of the country.

Key military towns along the Great Wall of China include Ji Town (蓟镇), Liaodong Town (辽东镇), Xuanfu Town (宣府镇), Chang Town (昌镇), Datong Town (大同镇), Shanxi Town (山西镇), Zhenbao Town (真保镇), Yansui Town (延绥镇), Ningxia Town (宁夏镇), Guyuan Town (固原镇), and Gansu Town (甘肃镇). They were gradually established along the Wall using it as their boundary.

== See also ==
- Dajingmen 大境門
- Gubeikou 古北口鎮
- Jiayu Pass 嘉峪關
- Huangya Pass 黃崖關
- Jingxing Pass 井陘關
- Juyong Pass 居庸關
- Niangzi Pass 娘子關
- Pingxing Pass 平型關
- Shanhai Pass 山海關
- Yang Pass 陽關
- Yanmen Pass 雁門關
- Yumen Pass 玉門關
