= Xuyi County =

Xuyi 盱眙县
- County
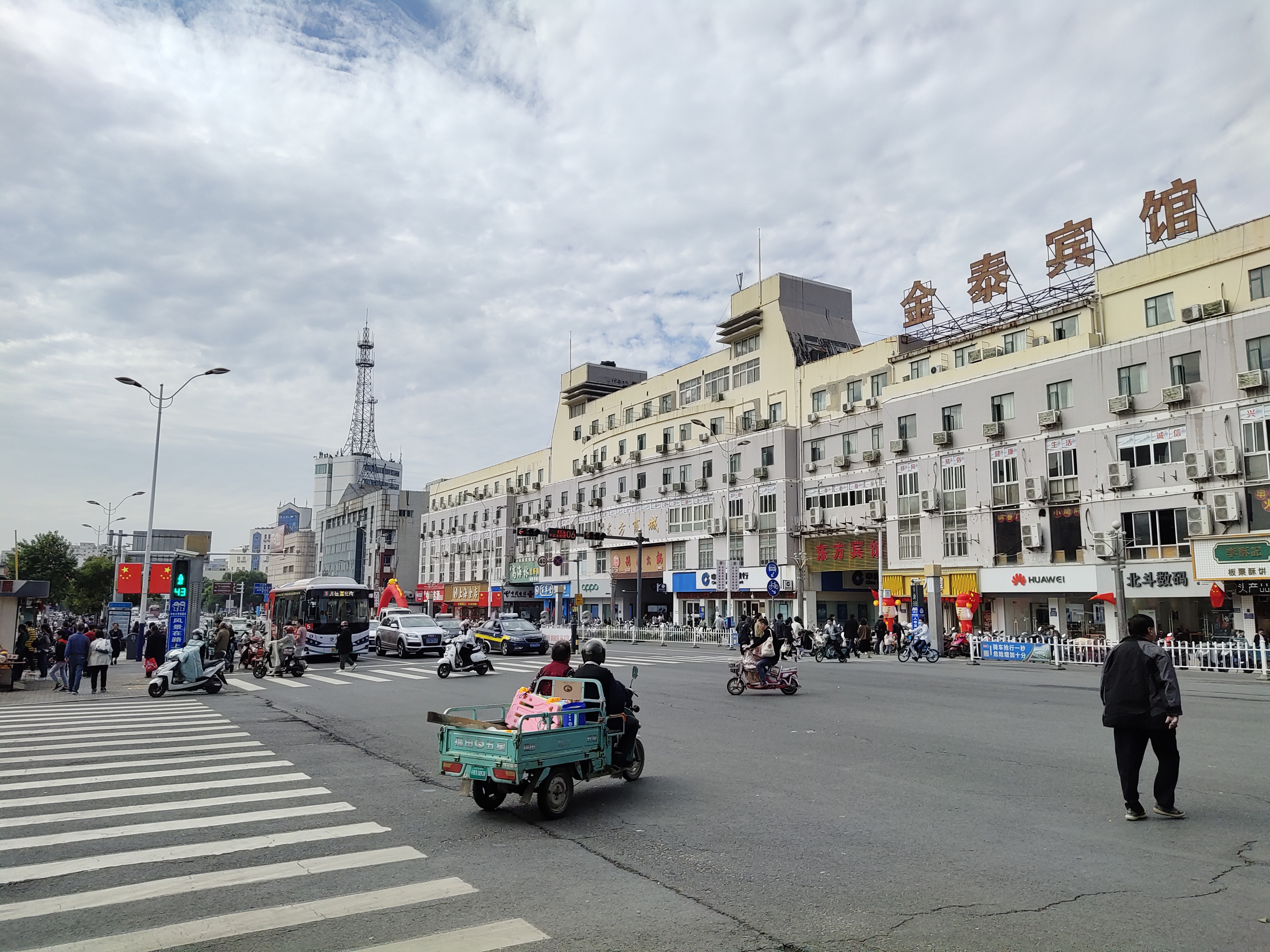
- Xuyi County in October 2020

- Location in Jiangsu
- Coordinates: 32°58′48″N 118°33′36″E
- Country: People's Republic of China
- Province: Jiangsu
- Prefecture-level city: Huai'an

Area
  - County: 2,497 km^{2} (964 sq mi)

Population (2020)
  - County: 607,211
  - Density: 243.2/km^{2} (629.8/sq mi)
  - Urban: 374,436 (62%)
  - Rural: 232,775 (38%)
- Time zone: UTC+8 (China Standard)
- Postal code: 211700
- Website: http://www.xuyi.gov.cn/

Xuyi County
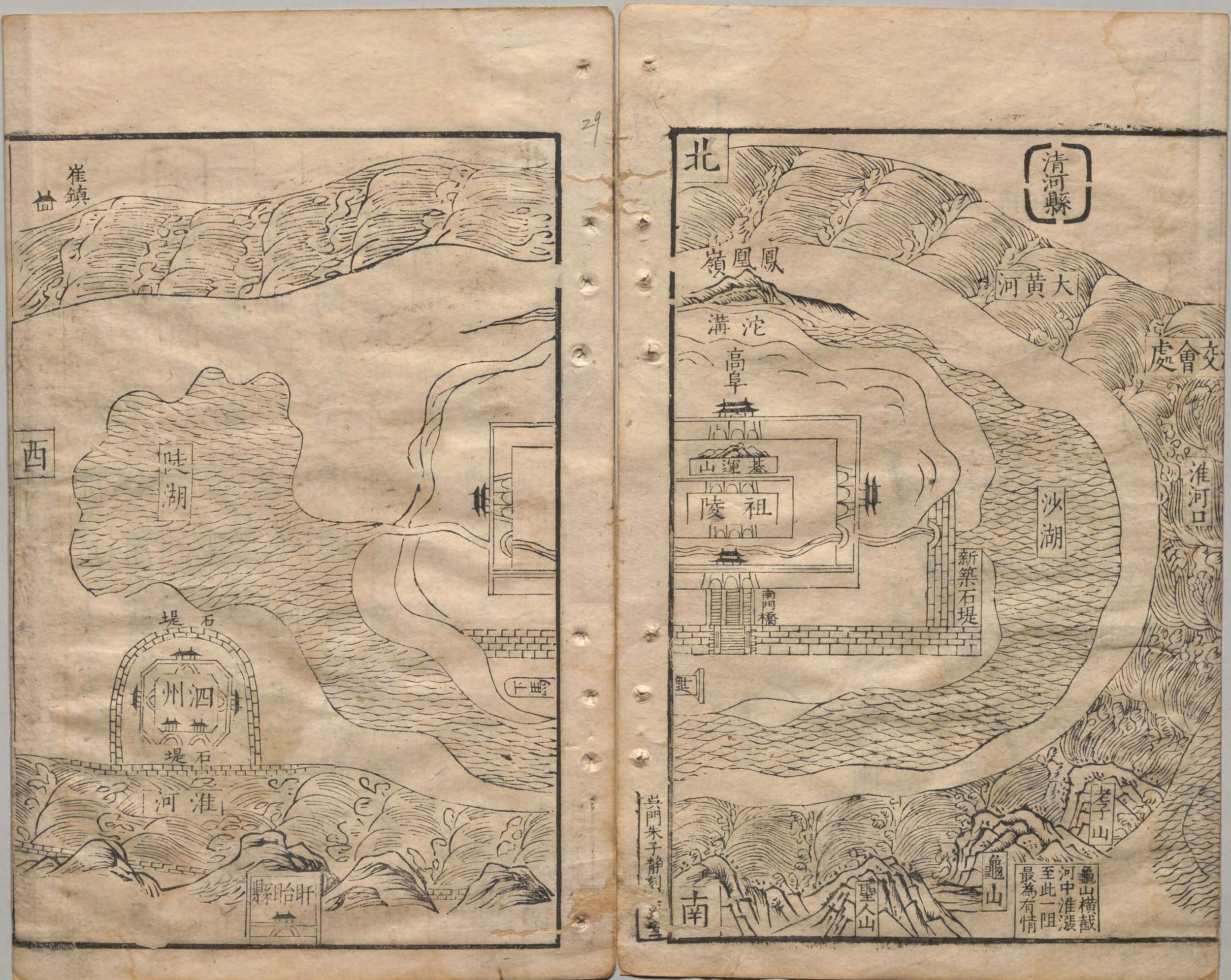
- Xuyi south of Sizhou, the Ming Zuling tombs, and the River Huai in a Qing-era depiction of the area before Hongze Lake's 1680 flood, from the Complete Library of the Four Treasuries
- Traditional Chinese: 盱眙縣
- Simplified Chinese: 盱眙县
- Postal: Chuyi
Transcriptions
Standard Mandarin
- Hanyu Pinyin: Xūyí xiàn
- Wade–Giles: Hsü-i Hsien

Xuyi is a county under the administration of Huai'an Prefecture in central Jiangsu Province in eastern China. The southernmost of Huai'an's county-level divisions, it borders the prefecture-level cities of Suqian, Jiangsu, to the north and Chuzhou, Anhui, to the south and west. Xuyi is the site of the Ming Zuling tombs and also noted for production of crayfish.

== Name ==
Xuyi is the atonal pinyin romanization of the Standard Mandarin pronunciation of the Chinese name 盱眙. The same name was previously romanized as Hsü-i in Wade-Giles and Chuyi in Postal Map romanization. The meaning of the name is unclear, but probably derives from phonetic transcription of an earlier name from the Dongyi or Wu who once held the area. It has also been variously derived from the idea of looking ahead with one's eyes opened wide—in reference to its position on a hill in wide plain—or to another nearby hill named Xuyi.

== History ==
In medieval China, the area around Xuyi was administered as part of the prefecture or subprefecture of Sizhou. It was the hometown of Zhu Yuanzhang's family, which fled to Fengyang before his birth and rise to power as the Hongwu Emperor of the Ming. He subsequently erected the expansive Ming Zuling tomb nearby, where veneration could be offered to his grandfather, great-grandfather, and great-great-grandfather, all posthumously elevated to the dignity of honorary emperors. Under the Ming, the area was part of Nanzhili, the special directly administered district around the southern capital at Nanjing.

Under the Qing, the province was renamed Jiangnan. Sizhou fell under its "Left" Governor and was later made part of Anhui Province. During the reign of the Kangxi Emperor, the Yellow River—then still flowing along a course south of Shandong—diverted to join the Huai further upstream. Its silt blocked the previous course of the Huai and caused Hongze Lake to grow enormously, swallowing both Sizhou and Ming Zuling tombs. With the previous county seat submerged, administration was moved first to Xuyi in 1680 and then west to the new Si County in 1777.

After the establishment of the People's Republic of China, Xuyi and Sihong were both moved from Anhui to Jiangsu in 1955 to allow for unified administration for the entire area around Hongze Lake. By the early 1960s, the lake had receded enough that the long-flooded Ming Zuling was rediscovered. After the Cultural Revolution ended, the provincial and national cultural administrations excavated and restored the tombs.

== Administrative divisions ==
At present, Xuyi County has 14 towns and 5 townships.

14 towns

- Xucheng (盱城镇)
- Maba (马坝镇)
- Guantan (官滩镇)
- Jiupu (旧铺镇)
- Guiwu (桂五镇)
- Huanghuatang (黄花塘镇)
- Mingzuling (明祖陵镇)
- Baoji (鲍集镇)
- Guanzhen (管镇镇)
- Heqiao (河桥镇)
- Tiefo (铁佛镇)
- Huaihe (淮河镇)
- Chouji (仇集镇)
- Guanyinsi (观音寺镇)

5 townships

- Weiqiao (维桥乡)
- Mudian (穆店乡)
- Wangdian (王店乡)
- Gusang (古桑乡)
- Xinglong (兴隆乡)

== Climate ==
Climate data for Xuyi, elevation 43 m (141 ft), (1991–2020 normals, extremes 1981–present)
Month	Jan	Feb	Mar	Apr	May	Jun	Jul	Aug	Sep	Oct	Nov	Dec	Year
Record high °C (°F)	20.6 (69.1)	26.5 (79.7)	34.2 (93.6)	33.8 (92.8)	36.7 (98.1)	37.5 (99.5)	39.3 (102.7)	38.6 (101.5)	37.4 (99.3)	33.3 (91.9)	28.9 (84.0)	22.7 (72.9)	39.3 (102.7)
Mean daily maximum °C (°F)	6.2 (43.2)	9.1 (48.4)	14.4 (57.9)	21.0 (69.8)	26.0 (78.8)	29.1 (84.4)	31.4 (88.5)	30.8 (87.4)	27.0 (80.6)	22.1 (71.8)	15.5 (59.9)	8.7 (47.7)	20.1 (68.2)
Daily mean °C (°F)	1.9 (35.4)	4.4 (39.9)	9.3 (48.7)	15.6 (60.1)	20.9 (69.6)	24.7 (76.5)	27.5 (81.5)	26.9 (80.4)	22.7 (72.9)	17.1 (62.8)	10.5 (50.9)	4.2 (39.6)	15.5 (59.9)
Mean daily minimum °C (°F)	−1.3 (29.7)	0.8 (33.4)	5.1 (41.2)	10.8 (51.4)	16.4 (61.5)	20.9 (69.6)	24.4 (75.9)	23.9 (75.0)	19.3 (66.7)	13.2 (55.8)	6.7 (44.1)	0.7 (33.3)	11.7 (53.1)
Record low °C (°F)	−12.6 (9.3)	−13.3 (8.1)	−7.4 (18.7)	−0.5 (31.1)	6.2 (43.2)	12.0 (53.6)	16.8 (62.2)	15.8 (60.4)	10.4 (50.7)	1.1 (34.0)	−6.4 (20.5)	−13.5 (7.7)	−13.5 (7.7)
Average precipitation mm (inches)	36.5 (1.44)	40.2 (1.58)	62.4 (2.46)	55.6 (2.19)	76.0 (2.99)	156.5 (6.16)	239.5 (9.43)	184.7 (7.27)	89.2 (3.51)	55.9 (2.20)	50.3 (1.98)	29.0 (1.14)	1,075.8 (42.35)
Average precipitation days (≥ 0.1 mm)	6.8	7.8	8.7	8.2	8.9	9.6	13.3	12.8	8.4	6.9	7.3	6.1	104.8
Average snowy days	3.8	2.7	1.0	0	0	0	0	0	0	0	0.7	1.2	9.4
Average relative humidity (%)	72	71	69	68	70	76	83	84	80	74	73	70	74
Mean monthly sunshine hours	126.6	128.5	159.5	186.3	188.3	151.8	167.2	174.8	162.5	163.6	140.1	137.3	1,886.5
Percentage possible sunshine	40	41	43	48	44	36	39	43	44	47	45	44	43
Source: China Meteorological Administration

== Sports ==
The Xuyi Olympic Sports Centre Stadium is located in the city of Xuyi. The football stadium has a capacity of 18,000 and it opened in 2017.

- Luyuan
