= Fuliji railway station =

Railway station in Suzhou, Anhui

Coordinates: 33.7622°N 116.9807°E

Fuliji 符离集
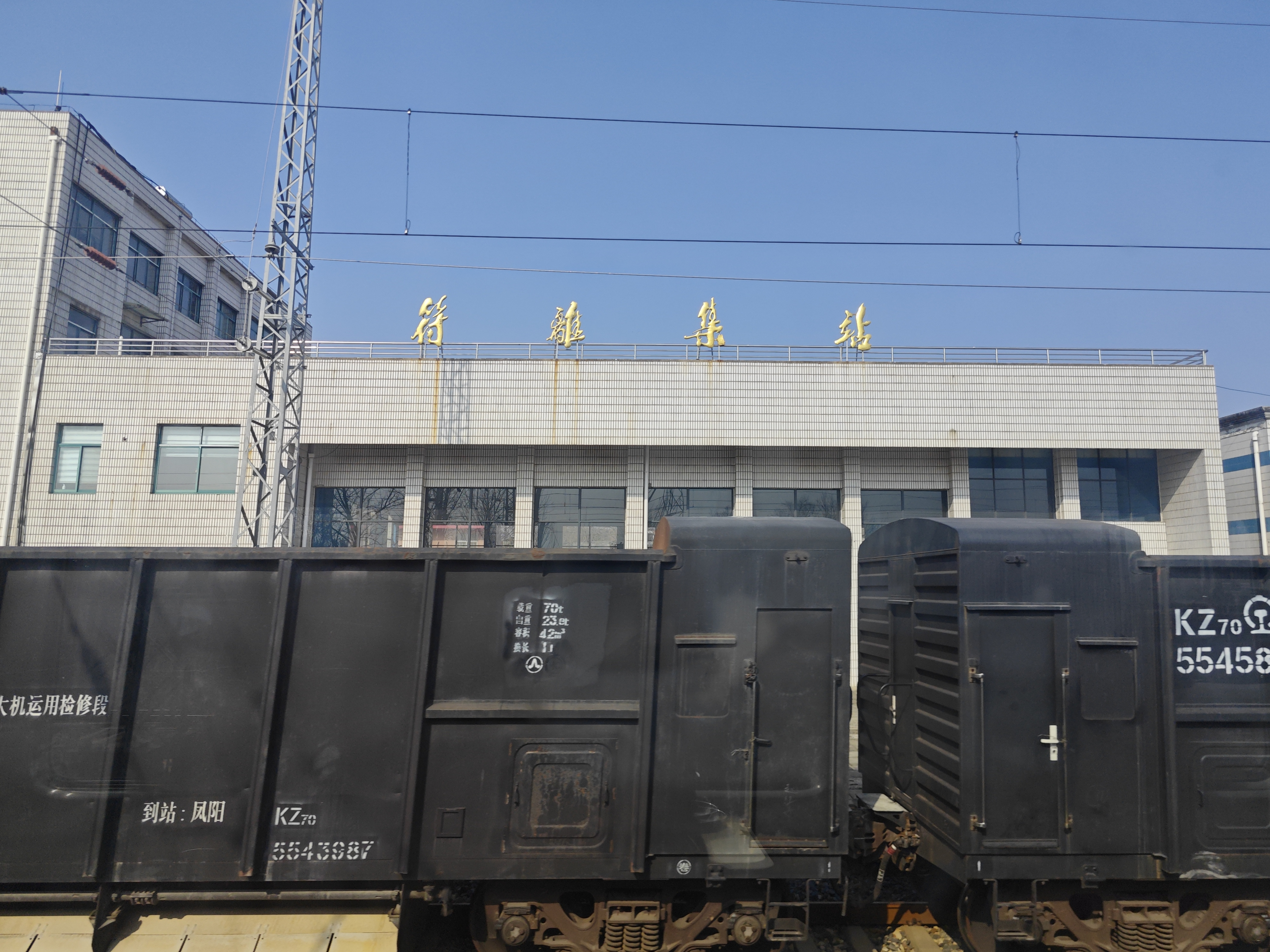

General information
- Location: Yongqiao District, Suzhou, Anhui; China
- Lines: Beijing–Shanghai railway; Suzhou–Huai'an railway; Fuliji–Jiahezhai railway
Location

Fuliji railway station (Chinese: 符离集站) is a railway station in Yongqiao District, Suzhou, Anhui, China. The station is situated in Fuli town at the junction between the Beijing–Shanghai railway, Suzhou–Huai'an railway, and Fuliji–Jiahezhai railway.

== History ==
This station was opened on the Tianjin–Pukou railway in 1912. The Tianjin–Pukou railway has since become part of the Beijing–Shanghai railway. Passenger services at this station and nearby Suixi railway station were suspended on 1 April 2006. The closure of the station was noted as leading to a reduction in tourists arriving with a knock on effect on the local roast chicken industry.
