= Si Prefecture =

Prefecture of imperial China

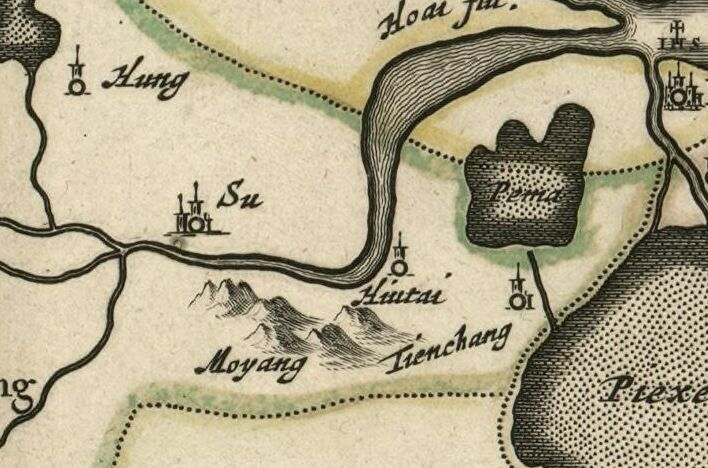
- Sizhou ("Su") on the Huai ("Hoai") shown as a subprefecture of Fengyang in Martino Martini's 1655 Novus Atlas Sinensis. It was subsequently elevated by the Qing to the status of an autonomous subprefecture within Jiangnan Province.
- Chinese: 泗州
- Literal meaning: zhou on the Si
Transcriptions
Standard Mandarin
- Hanyu Pinyin: Sìzhōu
- Wade–Giles: Ssu-chou

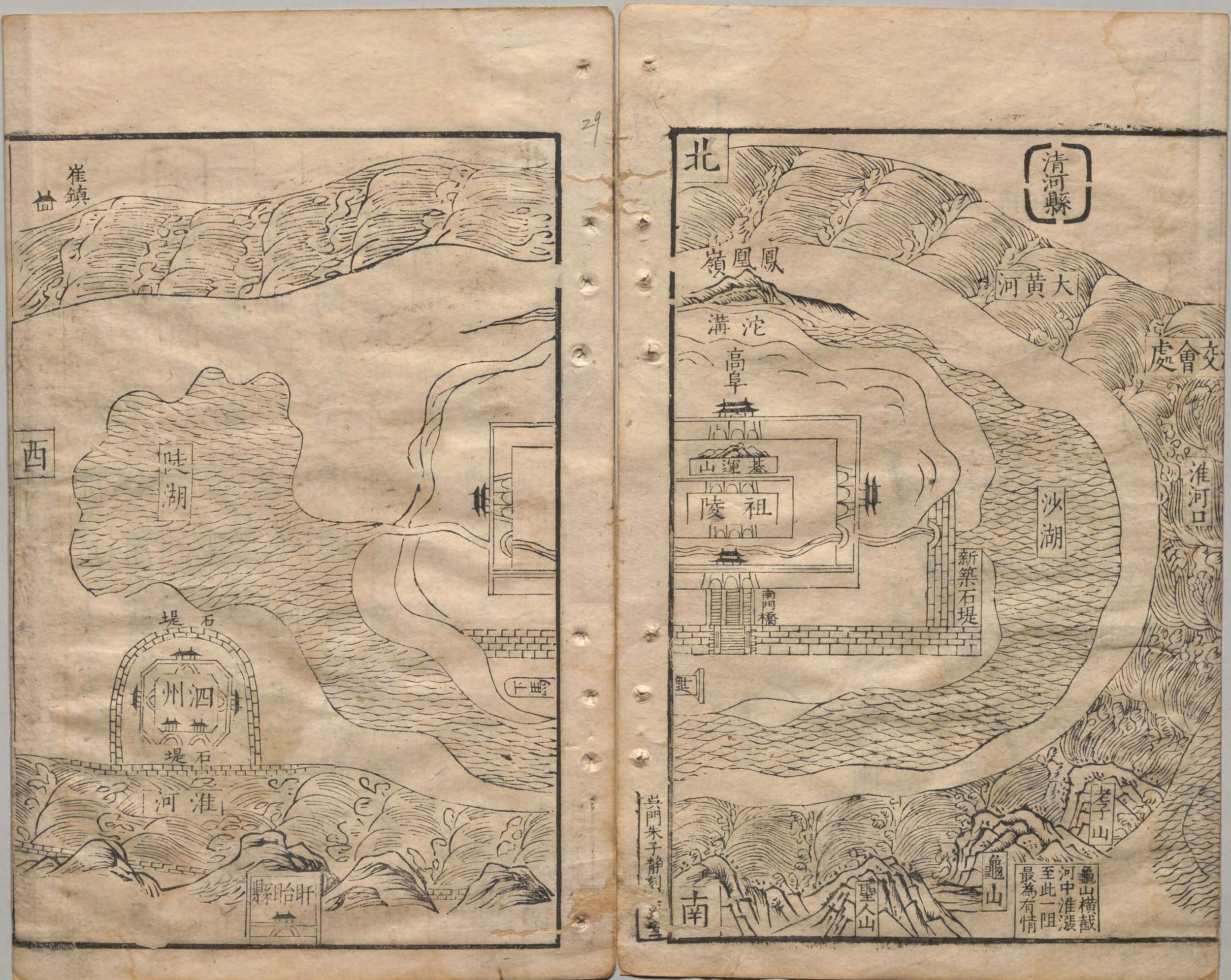
The former location of Sizhou's walled prefectural seat near the Ming Zuling tombs. A diagram of the area before its complete flooding beneath Hongze Lake in 1680 from the section on flood prevention in the Qing-era Complete Library of the Four Treasuries.

Sizhou, Si Prefecture, or Si Subprefecture was a zhou of imperial China variously placed in what is now Xuyi County, Jiangsu, or nearby Si County, Anhui, both in China. Named for the Si River, it existed intermittently from 580 to 1912, during which time the relative position of a zhou within Chinese administrations varied. The same name Sizhou was used for the town used as the seat of the prefectural or subprefectural government, which also varied, and is preserved in modern Anhui's Si County and Sicheng.

== Geography ==
=== Tang ===
The administrative region of Si Prefecture in the Tang dynasty is in the border area of modern northwestern Jiangsu and northern Anhui. It probably includes parts of modern:

- Under the administration of Suqian, Jiangsu:
  - Suqian
  - Shuyang County
  - Siyang County
  - Sihong County
- Under the administration of Xuzhou, Jiangsu:
  - Pizhou
  - Suining County
- Under the administration of Huai'an, Jiangsu:
  - Lianshui County
  - Xuyi County
- Under the administration of Lianyungang, Jiangsu:
  - Guannan County
- Under the administration of Suzhou, Anhui:
  - Si County

=== Qing ===
Under the Qing, Si Subprefecture formed a division of Jiangnan Province. The subprefectural seat at Sizhou was entirely submerged within Hongze Lake in 1680, along with the nearby Ming Zuling tombs. The seat of government was subsequently moved first to Xuyi in what is now Jiangsu's Huai'an Prefecture and Si County in Anhui.
