= Pan Jixun =

Chinese scholar-bureaucrat and hydrologist

- 潘季馴
- Born: April 23, 1521; Wucheng County, Zhejiang, Ming Empire
- Died: April 12, 1595 (aged 73); Wucheng County, Zhejiang, Ming Empire
- Occupations: Scholar-official hydrologist

Pan Jixun
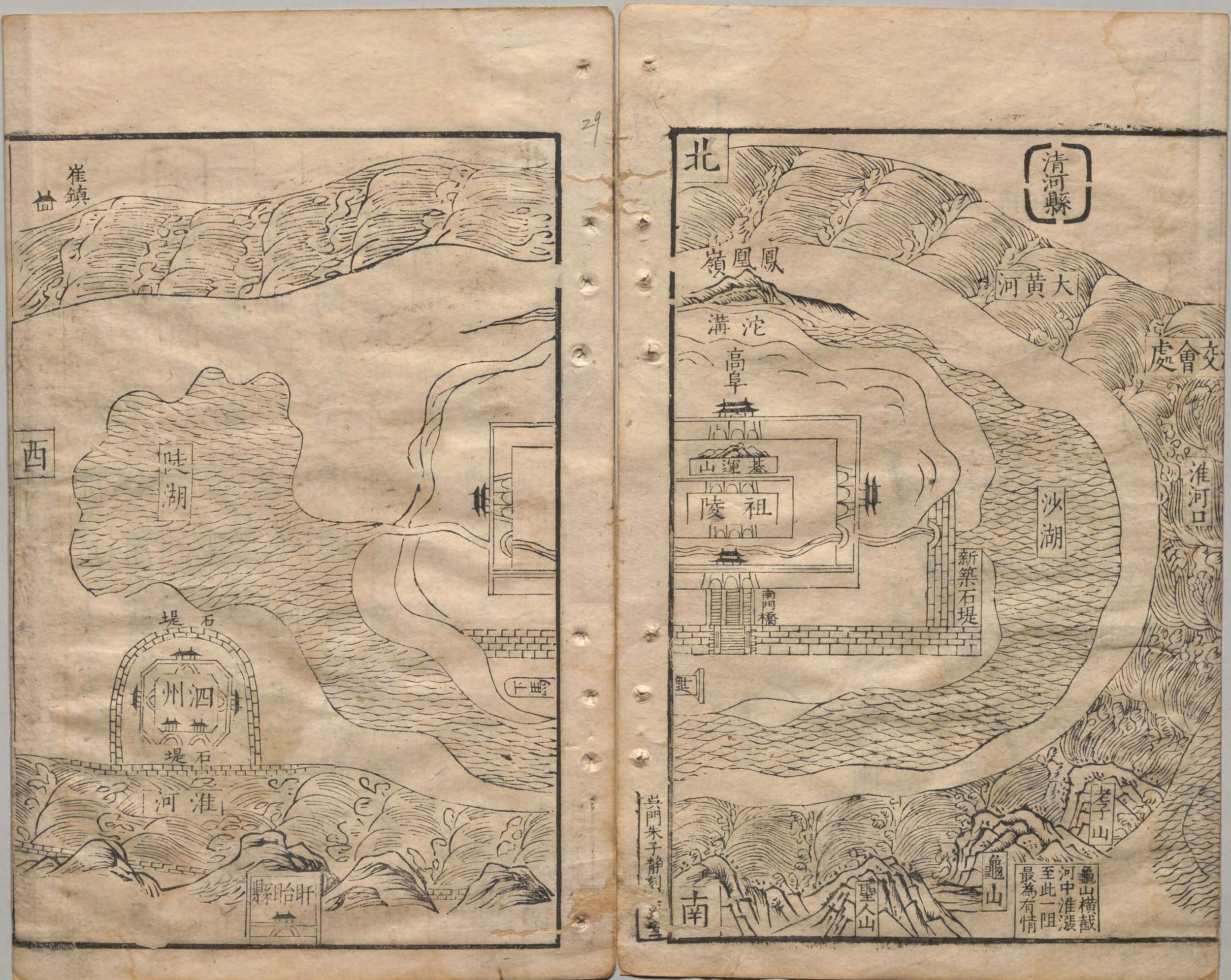
- The diagram of the former layout of the Ming Zuling printed in the Siku Quanshu reprint of the Overview of River Maintenance
- Traditional Chinese: 潘季馴
- Simplified Chinese: 潘季驯
Transcriptions
Standard Mandarin
- Hanyu Pinyin: Pān Jìxùn
- Wade–Giles: P'an Chi-hsün

Courtesy Name
- Traditional Chinese: 時良
- Simplified Chinese: 时良
Transcriptions
Standard Mandarin
- Hanyu Pinyin: Shíliáng
- Wade–Giles: Shih-liang

Pseudonym
- Chinese: 印川
Transcriptions
Standard Mandarin
- Hanyu Pinyin: Yìnchuān
- Wade–Giles: Yin-ch'uan

Pan Jixun (1521–1595), courtesy name Shiliang and pseudonym Yinchuan, was a Chinese scholar-bureaucrat and hydrologist of the Ming dynasty. He was noted for his monograph Overview of River Management (《河防一覽》, Héfáng Yīlǎn).

== Biography ==
Pan was a native of Wucheng County (modern Huzhou) in Zhejiang. He passed the provincial examination of 1550. He was made a judge in Jiujiang afterwards and became the inspecting censor of Guangdong, director of education for Beizhili, and undersecretary in the Grand Court of Judicial Review. Before leaving Guangdong, he implemented the "fair tax arrangement for the hundred-and-tithing system" (均平里甲法, junping lijia fa). Later, he was appointed Right Assistant Censor-in-Chief and then Director-General of the Grand Canal (總理河道, zongli hedao), but he was soon obliged to resign to mourn his mother's death according to traditional rite. He returned to the position in 1570 and built a low dyke (縷堤, lüdi) from Xuzhou to Pizhou that incurred criticism for hindering the traffic in tribute grain. He was demoted in the next year. Zhang Juzheng reinstated Pan in 1578, the positions of Director-General of the Grand Canal and Director-General of the Grain Tribute having been combined into a single position known as the zongli hecao tidu junwu (總理河漕提督軍務). Before this was undone in 1588, he expanded the Han-era Gaojia Weir (高家堰, Gaojiayan) first constructed by Chen Deng, attempting to use the Huai to clear the silt of the Yellow River which then flowed south into Hongze Lake. He was rewarded with the title of Grand Guardian of the Heir Apparent and promoted first to Minister of Works and then to Right Censor-in-Chief and Director of the Grand Canal (總督河道, zongdu hedao).

As Director-General of the Grand Canal in 1572–1574, Wan Gong's solution for the Grand Canal and the Yellow River was building dyke to confine and narrow a section of the watercourse, increasing the velocity of the current ensued and causing the current with higher velocity to carry more silt so that the watercourse would discharge silt into the sea. Pan endorsed and generalized that, summarizing in eight characters: "Clearing silt with current confined by building dykes" (築堤束水, 以水攻沙).

Pan proposed several suggestions towards the Wanli Emperor:

1. Fill breaches to keep the Yellow River on its course
2. Build dykes to contain future flooding
3. Repair sluices and dams to protect the Grand Canal
4. Consolidate weirs and embankments
5. Suspend dredging of estuaries to reduce expenses
6. Suspend any plans to return the Yellow River to its former northern course

During early 1580, Pan became the Minister of War in Nanjing and then the Minister of Justice. He requested that the emperor forgive Zhang Juzheng's bereaved family, which caused him to be demoted to common status in 1584. Four years later, the emperor permitted Grand Secretary Shen Shixing to recall Pan.

Pan used liukun (柳輥) to plug gaps. These were bundles of rods forming a ring around a central trunk, usually more than 20 feet in diameter and 150 feet long. He argued that levees should never be built as extremely long and continuous embankments. There were constituent embankments of the system. Those along a river (lüdi) concentrated the water, those parallel to these (遥堤, yaodi) were necessary in case the inner dams broke, and transverse dams (格堤, gedi) forced silt into controlled deposits. Later, he put forward the idea of reinforcing the embankments with silt gathered in depressions by diverting floods and using silt levees to replace lower lüdi. These practices impeded the drainage of the Huai and Yellow Rivers and expanded Hongze Lake. The prefectural seat of Sizhou was flooded and Ming Zuling tomb was threatened. This led to further censure and forced his resignation soon after Shen's removal. Under the Qing, the situation he left around Hongze Lake led to Sizhou and the Ming Zuling's entire submersion beneath the lake. Even after the Yellow River returned to its northern course in the mid-19th century, it wasn't until the 1960s that the water receded enough to once again reveal the tombs.

== Monuments ==
There is a bridge in Longquan Subdistrict, Wuxing District of Huzhou, Zhejiang named "Pangong Bridge" (潘公桥) after Pan Jixun.

== See also ==
- Jin Fu
