= Sixian =

Sixian may refer to:

- Si County (simplified Chinese: 泗县; traditional Chinese: 泗縣; pinyin: Sìxiàn), Anhui Province
- The Sixian dialect (simplified Chinese: 四县腔; traditional Chinese: 四縣腔) of Hakka Chinese
