= Hongze Lake =

Lake in China

- Hungtze Hu, Hung-tse Hu
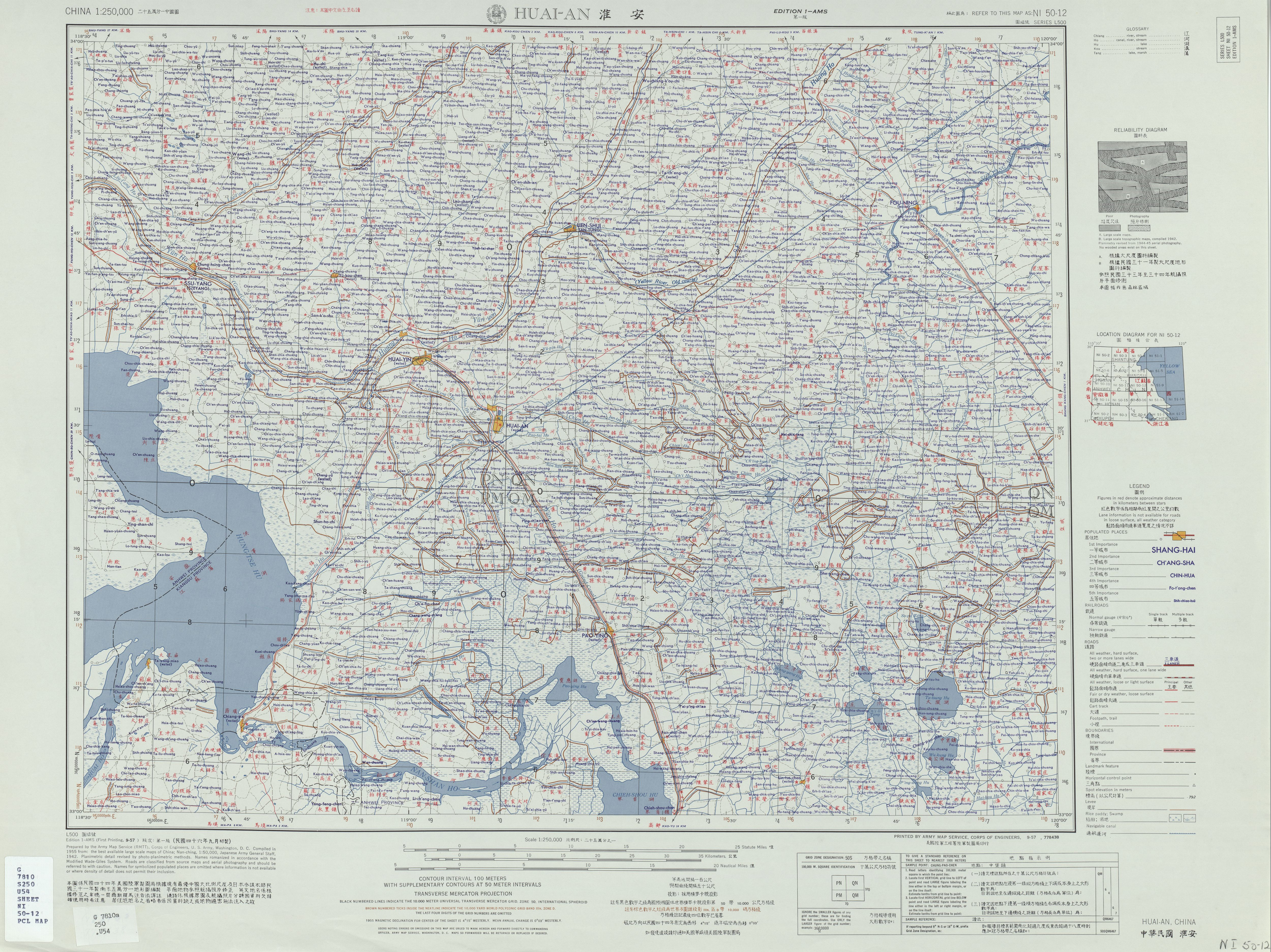
- A 1955 US Army Map Service map of the area around Hongze Lake ("Hung-tse Hu 洪澤湖")

- Location within Jiangsu
- Location: Jiangsu Province
- Coordinates: 33°18′27″N 118°42′36″E
- Primary inflows: Huai River; Si River, Yellow River (historically)
- Primary outflows: Huai River
- Basin countries: China

Hongze Lake
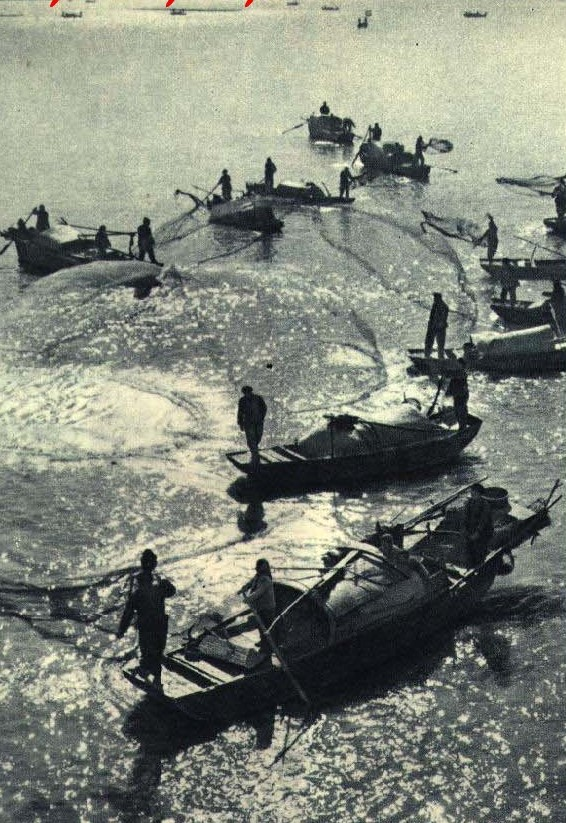
- Fishing on Hongze Lake (1962)
- Traditional Chinese: 洪澤湖
- Simplified Chinese: 洪泽湖
Transcriptions
Standard Mandarin
- Hanyu Pinyin: Hóngzé hú
- Wade–Giles: Hung-tse Hu

Fuling Lakes (antiquity)
- Chinese: 富陵湖
Transcriptions
Standard Mandarin
- Hanyu Pinyin: Fùlíng hú
- Wade–Giles: Fu-ling Hu

Pofu Pond (Han–Sui)
- Chinese: 破釜塘
Transcriptions
Standard Mandarin
- Hanyu Pinyin: Pòfǔ táng
- Wade–Giles: P'o-fu T'ang

Hongze Pond (Sui–Tang)
- Traditional Chinese: 洪澤塘
- Simplified Chinese: 洪泽塘
Transcriptions
Standard Mandarin
- Hanyu Pinyin: Hóngzé táng
- Wade–Giles: Hung-tse T'ang

Hongze Lake, previously romanized as Lake Hungtze or Hung-tse, is the fourth-largest freshwater lake in China. Although it is known to have existed from antiquity, it drastically increased in size during the Qing when the Yellow River—then still flowing south of Shandong—merged with the Huai. The increased sediment and flow combined to greatly expand the lake, swallowing the previous regional center of Sizhou and the Ming Zuling tombs. During the imperial and republican periods, the lake formed part of the border between Jiangsu and Anhui provinces but since 1955, border changes have put it entirely in Jiangsu, in the counties of Sihong and Siyang in Suqian Prefecture and Xuyi and Hongze in Huai'an Prefecture. Since the establishment of the People's Republic of China, the lake has generally decreased in size as more of its inflow has been diverted for irrigation.

== Geography ==
Hongze Lake reaches an area of about 3 million mu when its depth reaches 12.5 meters (41 ft), making it the second-largest freshwater lake in Jiangsu and the fourth- or fifth-largest in the country, behind lakes Poyang, Dongting, Tai, and Hulun. Hongze Lake's meandering shoreline usually runs around 365 kilometers (227 mi).

== History ==
The area that now forms Hongze Lake was an inlet of the East China Sea about 2 million year ago before being closed in by sediment from the Huai and other nearby rivers. In Chinese antiquity, the area formed a number of shallow lakes collectively known as Fuling. Other nearby lakes at the time that later merged into Hongze were Nidun and Wanjia. The hegemon Fuchai of Wu constructed the Han or Hangou Canal (t 邗溝, s 邗沟, Hángōu), connecting the lake system with Yangzhou and the Yangtze Delta in 486 bc to improve the supply lines of his army in conflicts with Qi.

Under the Han, Fuling was renamed Pofu Pond. Acting as part of Lü Bu's faction, the Guangling administrator Chen Deng completed the first part of the Gaojia Weir (高家堰, Gāojiāyàn) around the year Jian'an 5 (around ad 200), a massive 30-li embankment intended to protect nearby farmland and the Hangou Canal and nearby settlements and farmland from floods of the Huai.

Under the Sui, the Hangou Canal and lake were connected to other waterways north and south to create the Grand Canal. During an inspection tour in 616, Emperor Yang renamed Pofu Hongze in his delight at the rain that greeted his arrival there, the rest of the countryside having suffered a drought. When it further expanded under the Tang, it became known as Hongze Lake. A massive flood of the Yellow River redirected it south of Shandong in 1128 or 1194, following the course of the Si to join the Huai below Huaiyin. The silt from the Yellow River began to obstruct the flow of the Huai and started to expand Hongze still farther, ultimately quadrupling its original size. During this period, it became an important fishery and center of irrigated cropland. It still forms the origin point of the North Jiangsu Main Irrigation Canal. Under the Yuan, the course of the Grand Canal in the area was straightened to circumvent the lake.

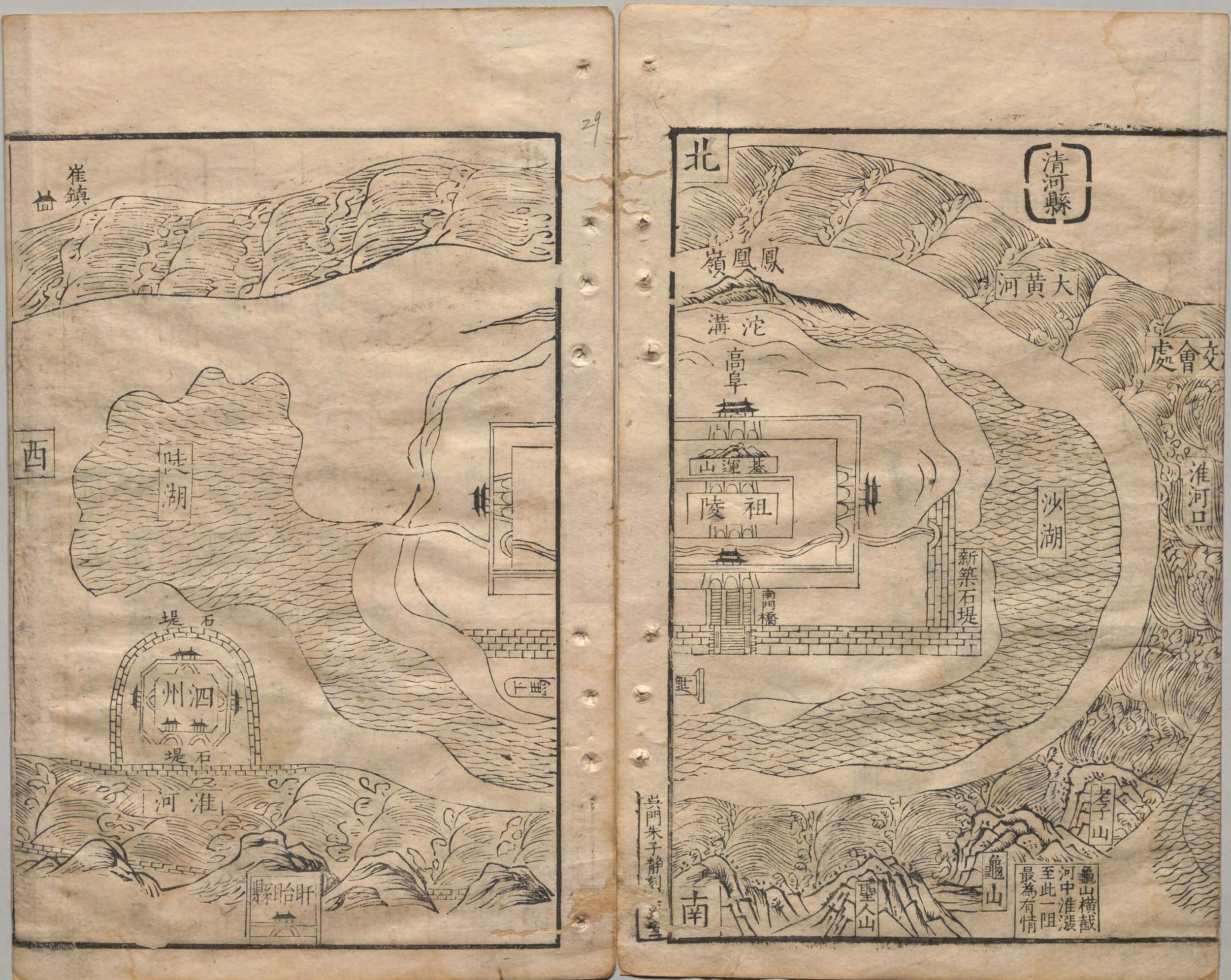
The map of the Huai and Yellow Rivers flowing around Sizhou and the Ming Zuling into Hongze Lake, from the Siku Quanshu edition of Pan Jixun's Overview of River Management. Both Sizhou and the tomb were entirely submerged beneath Hongze Lake during a subsequent flood in 1680.

Under the Hongwu Emperor, the first emperor of the Ming dynasty, the Ming Zuling garment tomb was built near the regional center Sizhou to honor his ancestors, whom he posthumously elevated to imperial status. Under his son the Yongle Emperor, the Gaojia Weir was further expanded, in part to protect the site. In Wanli 7 (c. 1579), Pan Jixun enlarged and reinforced the weir with stone along its then 40 to 42 kilometers (25 to 26 mi) of length. His mismanagement of the area's difficult hydrology allowed Sizhou to flood and threatened the tombs, leading to his demotion and dismissal.

By the Qing, the Yellow River had built up enough silt that it changed course again to merge with earlier tributaries of the Huai. In Kangxi 16 (c. 1677), the viceroy of rivers Jin Fu (t 靳輔, s 靳辅, Jìn Fǔ, 1633–1692) extended the embankments from Zhouqiao to Jiangba (t 蔣壩, s 蒋坝, Jiǎngbà). A few years later in 1680, the increased silting produced enlarged Hongze Lake so much that it entirely consumed Sizhou and the Ming Zuling. The Kangxi and Qianlong Emperors continued the expansion and reinforcement of the Gaojia Weir, reaching 67–70 kilometers (42–43 mi) and completing the modern Hongze Lake Embankment. Altogether, from Wanli 3 (c. 1575) to Xianfeng 5 (c. 1855), the Gaojia Weir and Hongze Embankment burst 140 times, involving breaches in 300 different sections. During the worst breaches, the lake level fell as much as 10 meters (33 ft). On one occasion in the 19th century, the Daoguang Emperor held the Jiangnan river supervisor Zhang Wenhao (t 張文浩, s 张文浩, Zhāng Wénhào, d. 1836) in chains at the repair site for a month during repairs necessitated by his mismanagement of when the dams need to be closed and opened; he was then dismissed to serve in the Xinjiang border guards. For their part, local people made prayers and offerings to nine dragons (九龍, jiǔ lóng) near Zhouqiao for protection; the temple was lost in a flood. In the early 1850s, the massive floods of the Yellow River that occasioned the Taiping Rebellion restored the Yellow River entirely to its northern course, finally removing its inflow and siltation from the lake.

Under the People's Republic of China, counties in Anhui that bordered the lake were ceded to Jiangsu in 1955 to allow unified administration of the lake. By the early 1960s, its water level had dropped enough that the stone statues of the Ming Zuling's sacred way were again visible along the shoreline. After the end of the Cultural Revolution, the provincial and national cultural preservation authorities excavated and restored the tombs, ultimately erecting a new 2,700-meter (1.7 mi) embankment to protect it from any further flooding. In 1966, 1976, and 1985, the Hongze Embankment itself was reinforced and improved with more modern engineering and materials, particularly with additional barriers to break up the force of the rivers' and lake's waves against the levees.
