= Suixi railway station (Anhui) =

Railway station in Huaibei, Anhui

Suixi 濉溪

General information
- Location: Suixi County, Huaibei, Anhui; China
- Coordinates: 33.925955°N 116.772457°E
- Line(s): Fuliji–Jiahezhai railway

Suixi railway station (Chinese: 濉溪站) is a railway station in Suixi County, Huaibei, Anhui, China. The station is an intermediate stop on the Fuliji–Jiahezhai railway.

== History ==
Passenger services at this station and nearby Fuliji railway station were suspended on 1 April 2006. The station continues to handle freight.
