= Jiagou, Suzhou, Anhui =

Jiagou 夹沟镇
- Town
- Location in China
- Coordinates: 32°45′50″N 116°56′39″E
- Country: People's Republic of China
- Province: Anhui
- Prefecture-level city: Suzhou
- District: Yongqiao District
- Time zone: UTC+8 (China Standard)

Jiagou (simplified Chinese: 夹沟; traditional Chinese: 夾溝; pinyin: Jiágōu) is a town in Yongqiao District, Suzhou, Anhui. As of 2020, it administers one agricultural farm community, one forestry farm community, and the following 17 villages:

- Jiagou Village
- Jinpu Village (津浦村)
- Wuliu Village (五柳村)
- Qili Village (七里村)
- Huding Village (湖町村)
- Zhentou Village (镇头村)
- Huangshan Village (黄山村)
- Xinfeng Village (辛丰村)
- Zhoupo Village (周坡村)
- Weizhai Village (魏寨村)
- Qinwan Village (秦湾村)
- Zhaoji Village (赵集村)
- Chayuan Village (杈元村)
- Qingshan Village (青山村)
- Liying Village (李营村)
- Xialiuzhai Village (夏刘寨村)
- Sunzhai Village (孙寨村)
