= Songting railway station =

Railway station in Huaibei, Anhui

Songting 宋町

General information
- Location: Lieshan District, Huaibei, Anhui; China
- Coordinates: 33°50′31.54″N 116°51′46.88″E
- Line(s): Fuliji–Jiahezhai railway

Songting railway station (Chinese: 宋町站) was a railway station in Lieshan District, Huaibei, Anhui, China. The station was an intermediate stop on the Fuliji–Jiahezhai railway.

== History ==
This station closed in September 2018 and was subsequently demolished.
