= Jin Fu (Qing dynasty) =

Chinese official of the Qing dynasty (1633–1692)

Jin Fu (Chinese: 靳輔; pinyin: Jìn Fǔ; Wade–Giles: Chin Fu, 1633 – 26 December 1692) was a Han Chinese bannerman official during the Qing dynasty notable for his work in river conservancy on the Yellow River.

== Early life ==
Jin Fu
- Traditional Chinese: 靳輔
- Simplified Chinese: 靳辅
Transcriptions
Standard Mandarin
- Hanyu Pinyin: Jìn Fǔ

Posthumous name
- Chinese: 文襄
Transcriptions
Standard Mandarin
- Hanyu Pinyin: Wénxiāng

Jin was born in Liaoyang to a family in the Chinese Bordered Yellow Banner with ancestral roots in Jinan, Shandong. His father worked in the Transmission Office as an assistant commissioner. Jin was appointed a compiler in the Hanlin Academy at the age of nineteen. Jin quickly climbed up the official ladder, working in the Ministry of War as a director and in the Office of Transmission as a vice-commissioner before serving as vice-minister in the Ministry of Rites. In 1671, Jin was appointed governor of Anhui and Right Vice-Censor-in-Chief.

== Director General of River Conservancy ==
In 1676, he left his post as governor and was appointed director-general of river conservancy in response to the serious floods wreaking havoc in Jiangsu province. Along with grain transport to Beijing through the Grand Canal and the Revolt of the Three Feudatories, controlling the flow of the Yellow River was among the three most critical issues facing the Kangxi Emperor at the time. Together with his private secretary, Chen Huang, Jin made a lasting contribution to the conservancy of the Yellow River by planning an enormous river control project that involved deepening many parts of the river, ensuring better maintenance of river works, levying new taxes, and reorganizing personnel, in addition to repairing and building new dikes and canals. The government approved Jin's plan and work began in 1678.

However, some parts of the Yellow River continued to flood despite three years of work on the project. Consequently, Jin was stripped of his official title. Nevertheless, he was allowed to continue supervising the river works. By 1683, the river had largely returned to its course and Jin's titles were restored. On his first tour of the South in 1684, the emperor honoured Jin with poems and gifts for his achievements in river conservancy. The same year, Jin further suggested that more water gates be built from Dangshan to Qinghe, which the court approved. Despite Jin's continuing efforts, the Yellow River was still not completely tamed. Serious floods occurred between 1684 and 1686 in northern Jiangsu. Among other proposals, Jin's plan to build more water gates and reinforce dikes soon ran into opposition from Tang Bin and other local officials in Jiangsu who were concerned that his expensive plans would starve the local population.

In 1685, a conflict erupted between Jin and Yu Chenglong (1638–1700), his subordinate appointed to oversee the drainage of central Jiangsu. Supported by local governors, Yu proposed to mitigate the flooding by widening and deepening the mouth of the Yellow River while Jin supported building more costly dikes and water gates near the western reaches of Lake Hongze. Jin's dispute with Yu over river control eventually became a flashpoint in the factional battles between Mingju's "Northern Party" and the "Southern Party" led by court officials from Jiangsu. Accused by the censor Guo Xiu of forming a clique with Mingju and of obstructing Yu's attempt to deepen the river bed, Jin was dismissed and Chen Huang was sentenced to prison but died of illness. Although dismissed, he continued to supervise the construction of the Zhong He canal. Considered to be "one of the major engineering accomplishments of the Qing dynasty", it facilitated grain transport and greatly benefited the local people. Upon realizing Jin's accomplishment and his popular acclaim with the people, the emperor restored his official rank in 1689 and again appointed him Director General of River Conservancy in March 1692.

In early September 1692, Jin fell ill in Yingze, Henan and died in December of the same year. Buried with full honours, the Kangxi Emperor also bestowed him the posthumous name Wénxiāng (文襄). The Yongzheng Emperor later posthumously promoted Jin to the rank of president of the Ministry of Works in 1727, ordered a temple to be built in his honour in 1729, and entered his name into the Temple of Eminent Statesmen the following year.

== Legacy ==
Jin's system of river conservancy was highly successful in preventing the Yellow River from flooding for over a hundred years. His river conservancy work is dramatized in the 2022 Chinese historical television series Tianxia Changhe. His character is played by Huang Zhizhong.

== See also ==
- Pan Jixun
