= North Jiangsu Main Irrigation Canal =

River in Jiangsu, China

- Interactive map of North Jiangsu Main Irrigation Canal

Specifications
- Length: 104.4 miles (168.0 km)

Geography
- Start point: Hongze Lake
- End point: East China Sea

The North Jiangsu Main Irrigation Canal (simplified Chinese: 苏北灌溉总渠; traditional Chinese: 蘇北灌溉總渠; pinyin: Sūběi Guàngài Zǒng Qú) (often called the Subei Canal) is located in the lower reaches of the Huai River, one of the major rivers in the north of Jiangsu Province, China. It originates at Gaoliangjian on Hongze Lake and runs through Hongze, Qingpu, Huai'an, Funing, Sheyang and Binghai county(or district) and joins the artificial estuary of Biandan Harbour. The canal is 168 km in length and can irrigate 1,720,000 hectares of farmland. The construction program was organized and directed by the headquarters of the Jiangsu Huai River management program between October 1951 and May 1952.

There are three main canals related to the main irrigation canal. The first is the famous Grand Canal which goes through the western part of north Jiangsu and crosses the Subei canal. It is called “the west main canal”. The second is the Chuanchang River. The main irrigation canal and Chuangyang River form a “T” junction called “east main canal”. The third is the Tongyang Canal, which lies in the southern part of north Jiangsu. It connects the start and ending points. This is called the “south main canal”. The North Jiangsu Main Irrigation Canal and these three main canals form a quadrangle connecting those inland rivers, which as a whole is an irrigation system. A parallel canal to the north, the Huai river estuarial canal, aims to direct more water to the sea.

== History ==
The canal was first built between 1934 and 1937 to divert part of the Huai River, which from time to time catastrophically flooded its surrounding region. In 1938, the Japanese destroyed many dams, which caused the Yellow River to flow into the Huai. The region was very severely flooded and the canal was largely destroyed.

After the Chinese Civil War, the government wanted to rebuild the canal for flood management. During the planning of this project China had entered the Korean War, which meant that the government did not have the economic resources to fund this project. However, Premier Zhou Enlai, who came from the Huai River drainage basin, insisted on carrying out the whole project because he knew how people suffered from flood and waterlogging in his hometown. In 1950 the inundation was particularly serious. Chairman Mao Zedong and Premier Zhou Enlai instructed relevant departments to work out a plan to regulate water conservancy. In 1951, Zhou Enlai held a conference on the project. Li Baohua, undersecretary of Ministry of Water Resources, reported the researches of his group and proposed a project plan. Zhou Enlai approved and supported the plan. On November 2, 1951, the project was put into practice. More than 1,190,000 civilian workers participated this project.

== Effects ==
The North Jiangsu Main Irrigation Canal is a multi-purpose project for flood control, irrigation and power generation.

The canal is one of the flood-relief canals and contributes greatly to the flood discharge of lower reaches of Huai River. It was designed to transfer water at a speed of 5000 stere per second. On the north side of the main canal, a drainage canal was built to drain the flood areas north of the main canal. The Canal can discharge floodwaters at a speed of 800 stere per second. When the water volumes in the north area of the main canal gets more serious, the Canal can help drain this area to discharge the floods. Alongside the main canal there have been built the Gaoliangjian intake sluice, the east canal diversion sluice, the Funing Waist gate and Liuduo tidal sluice.

The Canal also irrigates north Jiangsu and the Lixiahe area, bringing water from Hongze Lake to irrigate land along the southern part of the Yellow River basin. It was planned to irrigate more than 240,000 hectares (590,000 acres) of farmland of both the Lixiahe area and the area north of the main canal.

The canal also has provides for ship navigation and electricity generation. In Gaoliangjian, on the northern canal, and Buning hydroelectric power generators and ship locks have been built near sluices. In total there are 36 culverts, 2 flood-release sluices and 4 road bridges associated with the main canal. A cross sluice was also built at Gaoliangjian between the Erhe river and the canal. This is a further flood drainage gate that strengthens the draining capacity of the main canal.

== Administration ==
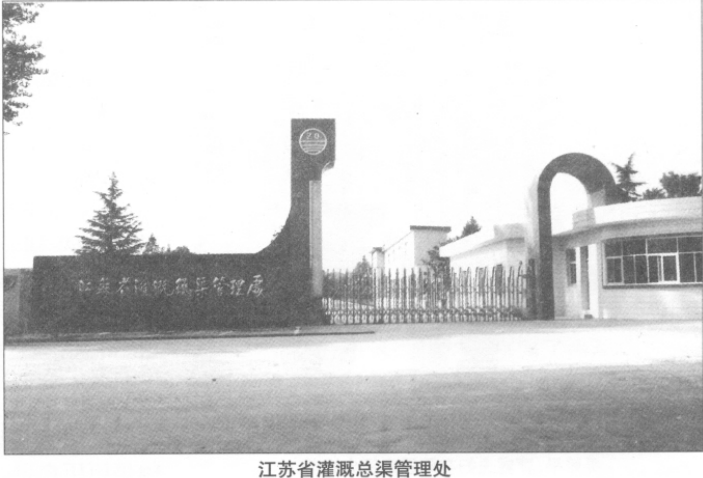
Jiangsu Irrigation Canal Management Office

The Jiangsu Irrigation Canal Management Office (江苏省灌溉总渠管理处) is in charge of the administration of riverine engineering and the provision of resources. Counties and districts along the canal are responsible for the repair and administration of the banks.

== Affiliated buildings ==
1. Gaoliangjian intake sluice
2. Liuduo tidal sluice
3. Tidal sluice of south Great Canal
4. Hydropower stations affiliated to different sluices
5. 36 culverts along the canal and 2 flood-release sluices
6. 4 road bridges across the canal

== See also ==
- History of canals in China
