= Daodong Subdistrict =

Daodong Subdistrict 道东街道
- Urban Subdistrict
- Dàodōng Jiēdào
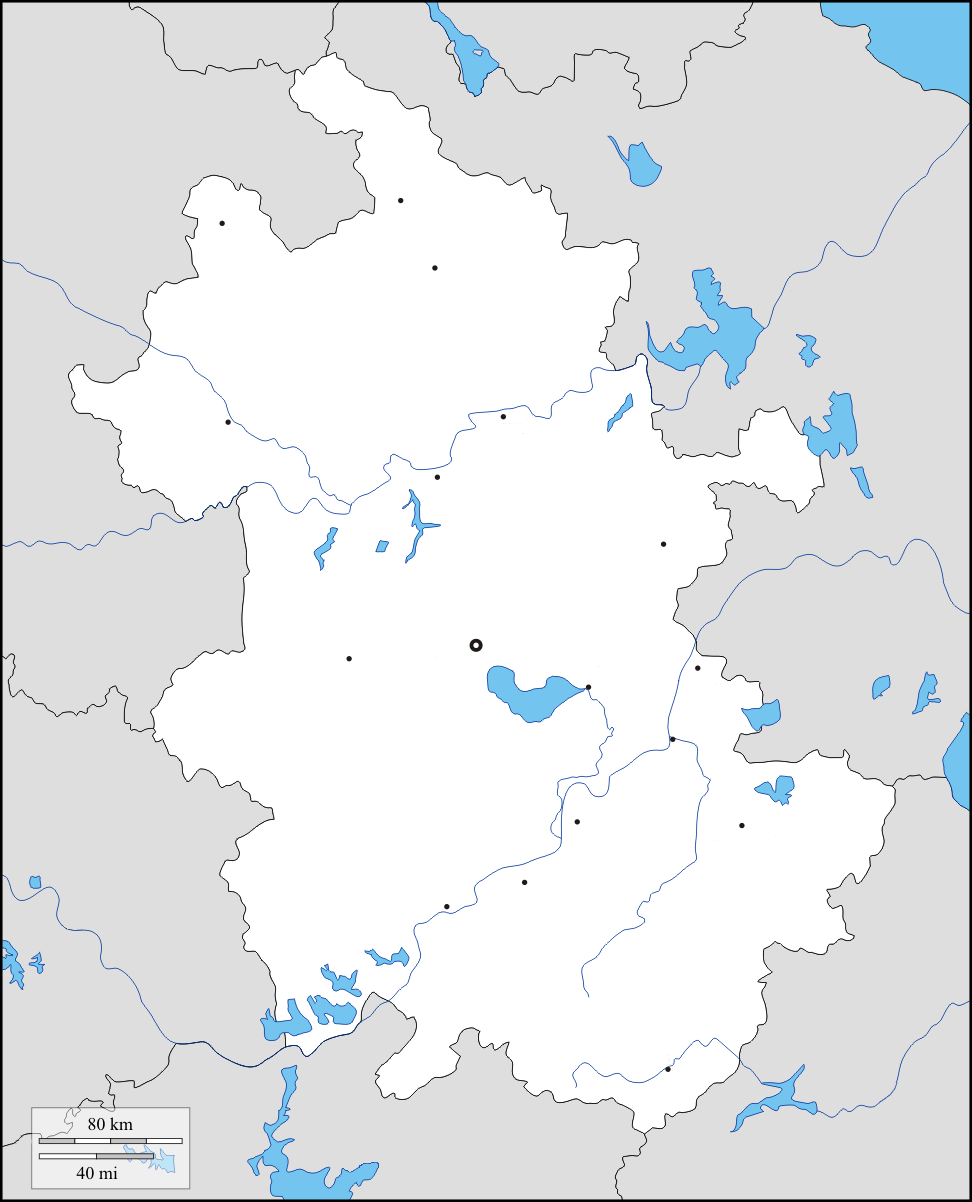
- Location in Anhui Location in China
- Coordinates: 33°37′58″N 116°59′46″E
- Country: People's Republic of China
- Province: Anhui
- Prefecture-level city: Suzhou
- District: Yongqiao

Area
  - Total: 2.428 km^{2} (0.937 sq mi)

Population (2010)
  - Total: 29,764
- Time zone: UTC+8 (China Standard)

Daodong Subdistrict (Chinese: 道东街道; pinyin: Dàodōng Jiēdào) is an urban subdistrict located in Yongqiao District, Suzhou, Anhui, China. According to the 2010 census, Daodong Subdistrict had a population of 29,764, including 15,008 males and 14,756 females. The population was distributed as follows: 4,387 people aged under 14, 22,820 people aged between 15 and 64, and 2,557 people aged over 65.

== See also ==
- List of township-level divisions of Anhui
