= Tianxia Changhe =

- Official poster
- Traditional Chinese: 天下長河
- Simplified Chinese: 天下长河
- Hanyu Pinyin: Tiānxià Chánghé
- Genre: Historical
- Written by: Zhang Ting
- Directed by: Zhang Ting
- Starring: Luo Jin; Yin Fang; Huang Zhizhong
- Country of origin: China
- Original language: Mandarin
- No. of seasons: 1
- No. of episodes: 40

Production
- Executive producers: Yao Yuzhu; Ren Xu
- Production locations: Hengdian World Studios, Inner Mongolia
- Production companies: Haoku Film&TV; Mango Super Media; Mango TV; Zhewen Film&TV

Original release
- Network: Hunan Television
- Release: November 11 – December 1, 2022

Tianxia Changhe (Chinese: 天下长河; lit. 'The Longest River in the World') is a 2022 Chinese historical television series written and directed by Zhang Ting, and starring Luo Jin, Yin Fang and Huang Zhizhong. The series tells the story of Chen Huang and Jin Fu governing the Yellow River during the Kangxi period of Qing dynasty (1644–1912). The series aired on Hunan Television from November 11 to December 1, 2022.

== Cast ==
=== Main ===
- Luo Jin as Kangxi Emperor of the Qing Empire.
- Yin Fang as Chen Huang, hydraulic scholar in the Qing Empire.
- Huang Zhizhong as Jin Fu, governor of Anhui, and later director-general of the river conservancy.

=== Supporting ===
- Xi Meijuan as Empress Dowager Xiaozhuang, grandmother of Kangxi Emperor.
- Liang Guanhua as Songgotu, a senior official of the Qing court, political opponent of Mingju.
- Gong Lei as Mingju, a senior official of the Qing court, political opponent of Songgotu.
- Su Ke as Yu Chenglong, an official of the Qing court.
- Lu Siyu as Gao Shiqi, a favourite courtier of Kangxi Emperor.
- Zhao Lin as Xu Qianxue, an official of the Qing court, and also a historian.
- Li Xinzhe as Jin Zhiyu, an official of the Qing court, a close ally of Songgotu.

== Soundtrack ==
No.	Title	Lyrics	Singer(s)	Length
1.	"Foundation (基业)" (Opening theme)
2.	"Life Passes Like a Dream (浮生若梦)" (Ending theme)	Li Bai	Wang Zhenhua
3.	"Untitled (无题)" (Interlude)

== Production ==
The script has been revised many times by director Zhang Ting (张挺) since it was created ten years ago. Tianxia Changhe began production on 7 September 2021 in Hengdian World Studios and finished filming on 8 January 2022 in Inner Mongolia.

== Reception ==
Douban, a major Chinese media rating site, gave the series 8.2 out of 10.
