= Shiguan River =

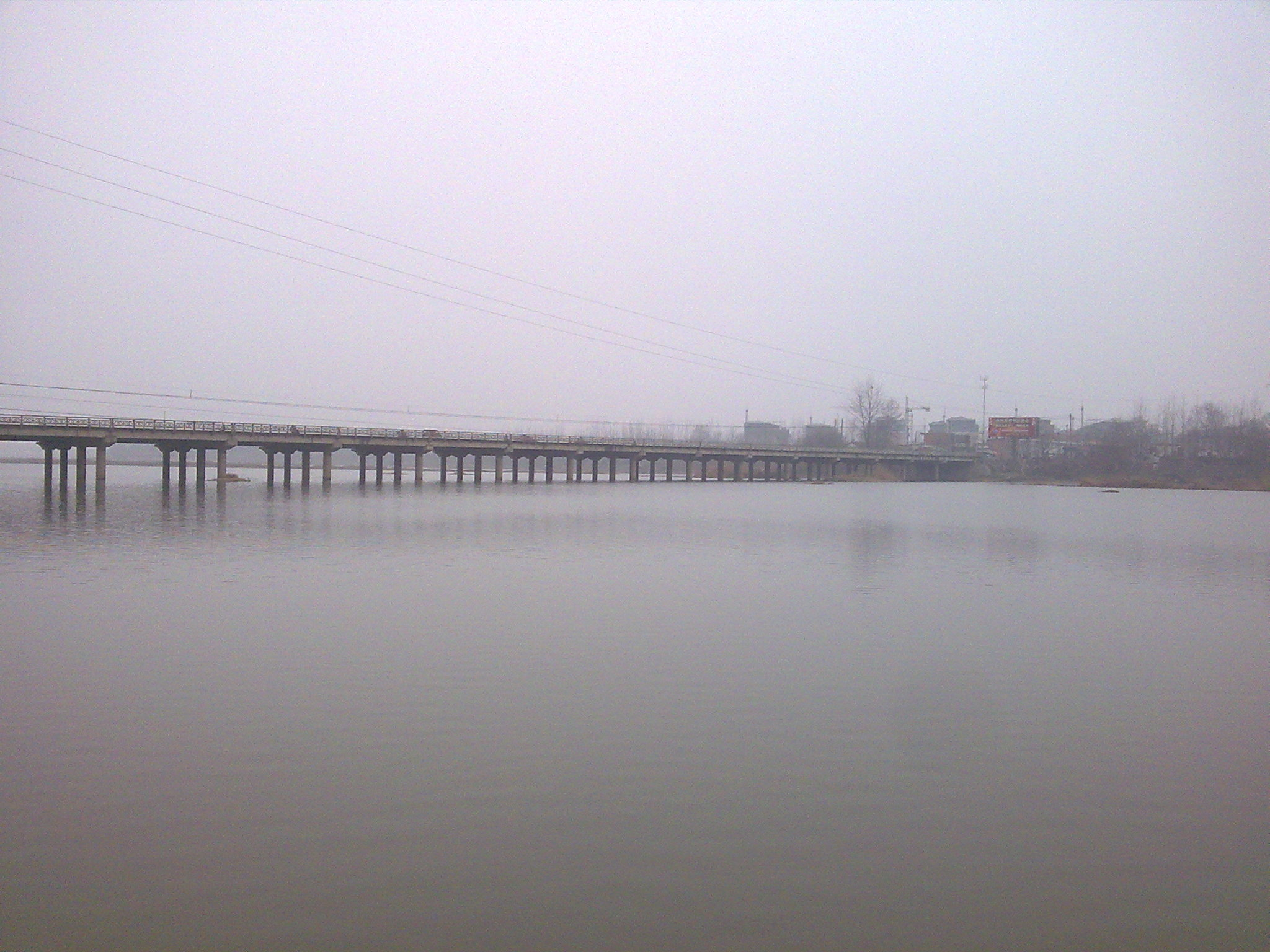
- 32°10′44″N 115°42′35″E
- Native name: Chinese: 史灌河

Location
- Country: China

Physical characteristics
- Source
  - location: Dabie Mountains
  - elevation: 1,166 m (3,825 ft)
- Mouth
  - location: Huai River
- Length: 220 km (140 mi)
- Basin size: 6,720 km^{2} (2,590 sq mi)
- Discharge
  - average: 68.6 m^{3}/s (2,420 cu ft/s)

The Shiguan River (Chinese: 史灌河; pinyin: Shǐguàn Hé) is a tributary of the Huai River. The Shiguan River is located in Henan province in central China.
