= Fuliji–Jiahezhai railway =

Railway line in China

Overview
- Native name: 符夹铁路
- Status: Operational
- Termini: Jiahezhai; Fuliji
- Stations: 3 (passenger)

Service
- Type: Heavy rail

History
- Opened: June 30, 1966

Technical
- Line length: 84.3 km (52 mi)
- Track gauge: 1,435 mm (4 ft 8 1/2 in) standard gauge
- Electrification: 50 Hz 25,000 V

The Fuliji–Jiahezhai railway (Chinese: 符夹铁路) is a railway line in Anhui and Jiangsu, China.

== History ==
Construction on the project began in August 1958 and the railway was opened in three sections. The section between Fuliji and Suixi opened in February 1960. The section between Xiaoxian and Jiahezhai opened in May 1961. The final section between Daihe and Xiaoxian opened on 30 June 1966.

Songting railway station closed in 2018.

== Specification ==
The line is 84.3 kilometres (52.4 mi) long. It starts at Jiahezhai railway station on the Longhai railway in the north and heads south, terminating at Fuliji railway station on the Beijing–Shanghai railway.
