= Jiangnan (Qing province) =

Historical province of the Qing dynasty

Jiangnan 江南
- Province of the Qing dynasty
- 1645–?
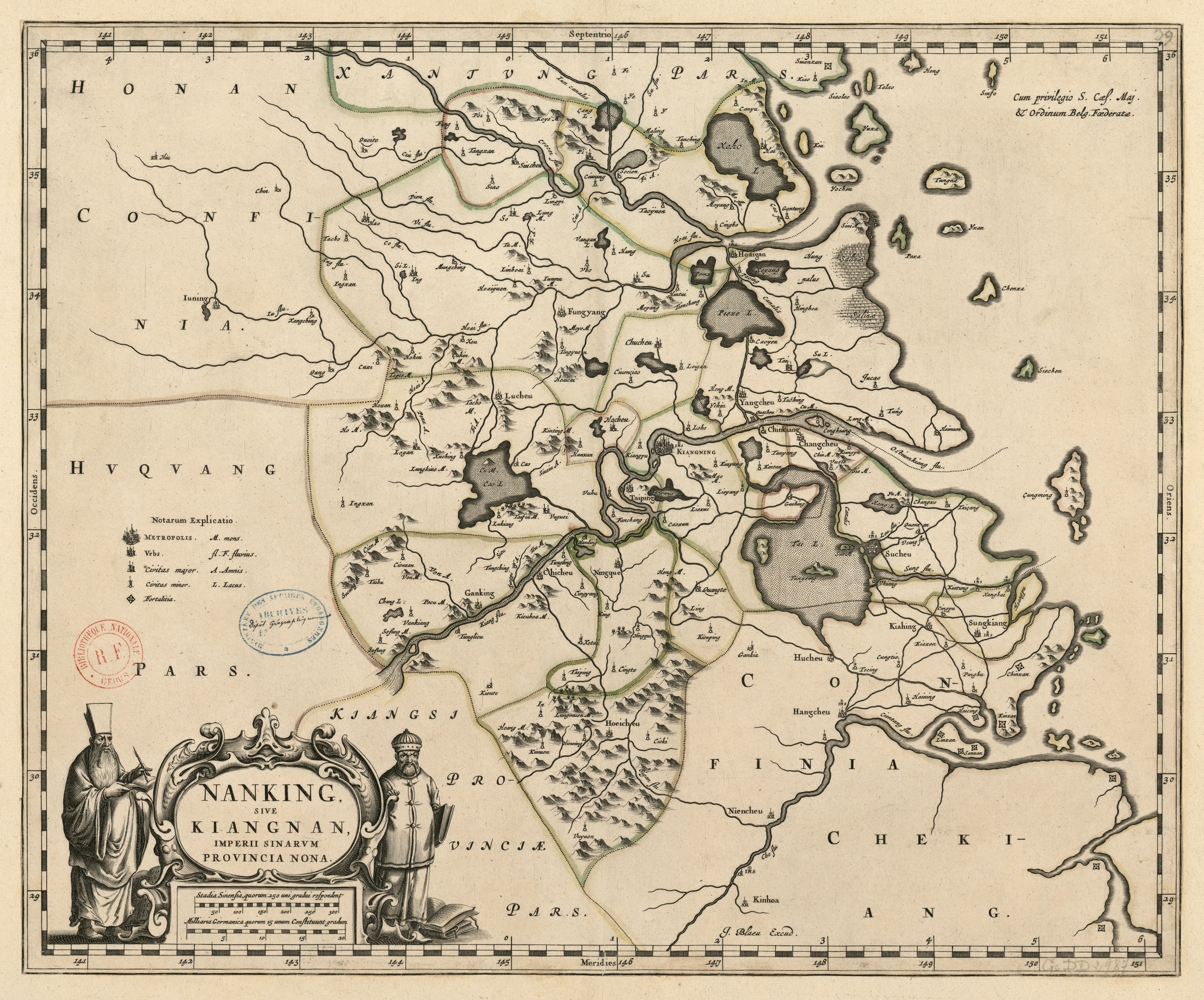
- Nanking sive Kiangnan ("Nanjing or Jiangnan"), the 9th provincial map of the Chinese Empire in Martino Martini and Joan Blaeu's 1655 Novus Atlas Sinensis
- Capital: Jiangning
- History
  - Established: 1645
  - Disestablished: ?
- Today part of: China; Jiangsu; Anhui; Shanghai

Jiangnan, formerly romanized as Kiangnan (Chinese: 江南省; Pinyin: Jiāngnán shěng; Wade–Giles: Chiang-nan Sheng; lit. 'Province South of the River'), was a historical province of the early Qing dynasty of China. Established in 1645 during the Qing conquest of Ming, it administered the area of the earlier Ming province of Nanzhili.

The province reached from north of the Huai River (at the time the course of the Yellow River) to south of the Yangtze River in East China. Its territory was later divided into the separate provinces of Jiangsu and Anhui during the reign of the Qianlong Emperor (1736–1795), although the exact timing is disputed.

== Administrative divisions ==
According to the "General History of Jiangnan" (江南通志, Jiangnan Tongzhi) in the Complete Library of the Four Treasuries, Jiangnan Province consisted of 16 full prefectures (fu) and 8 independent subprefectures or autonomous counties (zhou). After 1661, its provincial governor was assisted by lieutenant governors who each oversaw half of the prefectures. The "Right" administration (右布政使) was based in Suzhou and oversaw Suzhou, Songjiang, Changzhou, Zhenjiang, and Ningguo Prefectures. The "Left" administration (左布政使) was based in Jiangning (now Nanjing) and oversaw the rest. After a series of changes, this division eventually became the basis for the separate provinces of Jiangsu and Anhui at some point under the Qianlong Emperor.

Each of these were further divided into counties (xian), some of which were attached to the prefectural seats. Lower levels were not centrally appointed by the imperial government, but were overseen by the county, prefectural, and provincial administration.

Administrative divisions in Chinese and varieties of romanizations
| Now Jiangsu & Shanghai | | | Now Anhui | | |
| Administrative division | traditional Chinese | simplified Chinese | Administrative division | traditional Chinese | simplified Chinese |
|---|---|---|---|---|---|
| Jiangning Fu (Note: Jiangning Fu, or Jiangning, now called Nanjing, was the capital of Jiangnan Province.) | 江寧府 | 江宁府 | Anqing Fu | 安慶府 | 安庆府 |
| Suzhou Fu | 蘇州府 | 苏州府 | Huizhou Fu | 徽州府 | 徽州府 |
| Songjiang Fu | 松江府 | 松江府 | Ningguo Fu | 寧國府 | 宁国府 |
| Changzhou Fu | 常州府 | 常州府 | Chizhou Fu | 池州府 | 池州府 |
| Zhenjiang Fu | 鎮江府 | 镇江府 | Taiping Fu | 太平府 | 太平府 |
| Huai'an Fu | 淮安府 | 淮安府 | Luzhou Fu | 廬州府 | 庐州府 |
| Yangzhou Fu | 揚州府 | 扬州府 | Fengyang Fu | 鳳陽府 | 凤阳府 |
| Xuzhou Fu | 徐州府 | 徐州府 | Yingzhou Fu | 潁州府 | 颖州府 |
| Taicangzhou | 太倉州 | 太仓州 | Chuzhou | 滁州 | 滁州 |
| Haizhou | 海州 | 海州 | Hezhou | 和州 | 和州 |
| Tongzhou | 通州 | 通州 | Guangdezhou | 廣德州 | 广德州 |
| | | | Lu'anzhou | 六安州 | 六安州 |
| | | | Sizhou | 泗州 | 泗州 |
