= Luyuan =

Luyuan may refer to the following places in China:

- Luyuan, Beijing
- Luyuan, Changchun
- Luyuan, Yanling
