= Yongqiao, Suzhou =

Yongqiao 埇桥区
- District
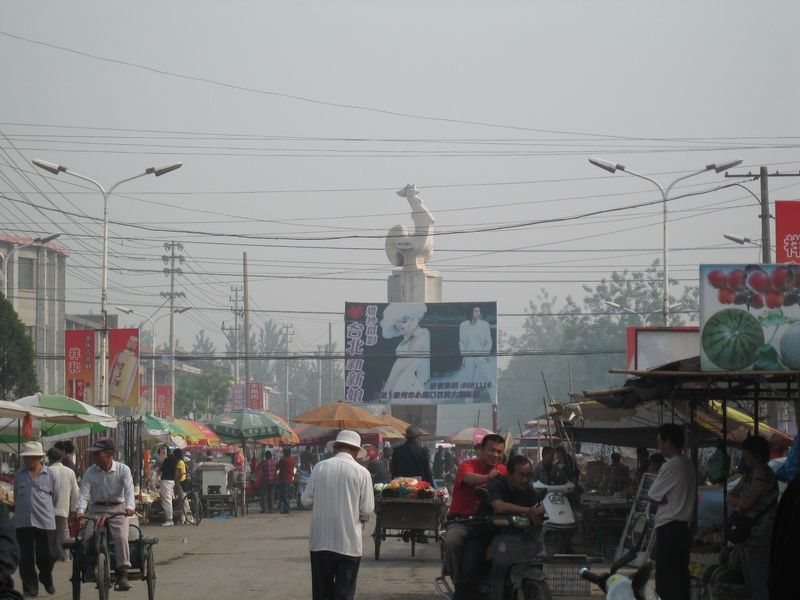

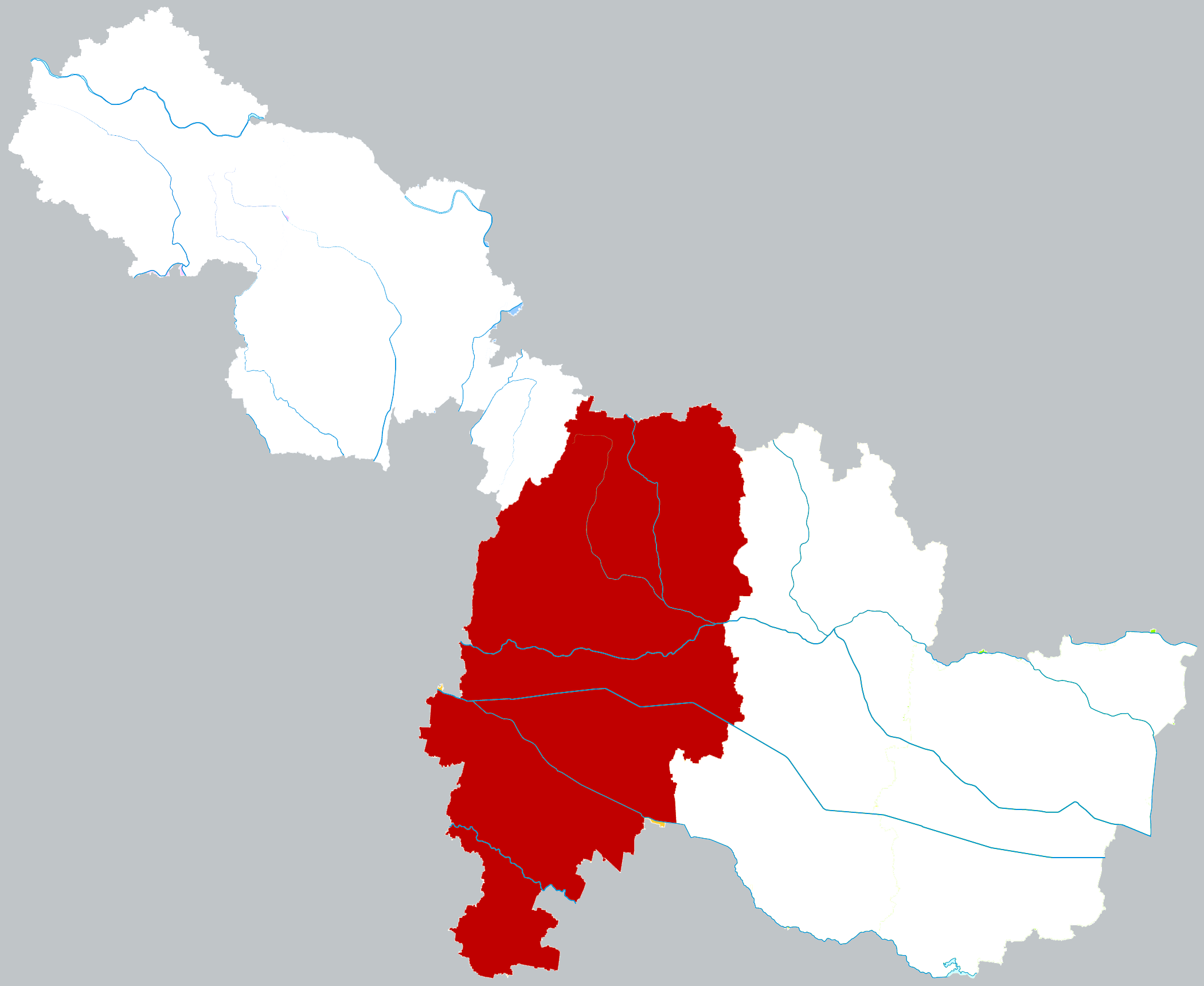
- Location of Yongqiao in Suzhou
- Coordinates: 33.64006°N 116.97742°E
- Country: People's Republic of China
- Province: Anhui
- Prefecture-level city: Suzhou

Area
  - Total: 2,868 km^{2} (1,107 sq mi)

Population (2018)
  - Total: 1,743,000
- Time zone: UTC+8 (China Standard)
- Postal code: 234000
- Website: 宿州市埇桥区人民政府 (in Simplified Chinese)

Yongqiao District (simplified Chinese: 埇桥区; traditional Chinese: 埇橋區; pinyin: Yǒngqiáo Qū) is a district of the city of Suzhou, Anhui Province, China.

== Administrative divisions ==
Nowadays, Yongqiao District is divided to 11 subdistricts, 15 towns and 10 townships.

11 Subdistricts

- Daodong (道东街道)
- Dongguan (东关街道)
- Xiguan (西关街道)
- Nanguan (南关街道)
- Beiguan (北关街道)
- Bianhe (汴河街道)
- Sanliwan (三里湾街道)
- Tuohe (沱河街道)
- Yongqiao (埇桥街道)
- Chengdong (城东街道)
- Chengxi (城西街道)

15 Towns

- Caocun (曹村镇)
- Chulan (褚兰镇)
- Fuli (符离镇)
- Dadian (大店镇)
- Daying (大营镇)
- Huidian (灰古镇)
- Jiagou (夹沟镇)
- Langan (栏杆镇)
- Qixian (蕲县镇)
- Luling (芦岭镇)
- Shichun (时春镇)
- Yaoyuan (姚园镇)
- Xisipo (西寺坡镇)
- Yong'an (永安镇)
- Zhuxianzhuang (朱仙庄镇)

10 Townships

- Beiyangzhai (北杨寨乡)
- Haohe (蒿河乡)
- Miao'an (苗庵乡)
- Jieji (解集乡)
- Shunhe (顺河乡)
- Taogou (桃沟乡)
- Xi'erpu (西二铺乡)
- Yangzhuang (杨庄乡)
- Yongzhen (永镇乡)
- Zhihe (支河乡)
