= Suzhou, Anhui =

Suzhou 宿州市
- Prefecture-level city
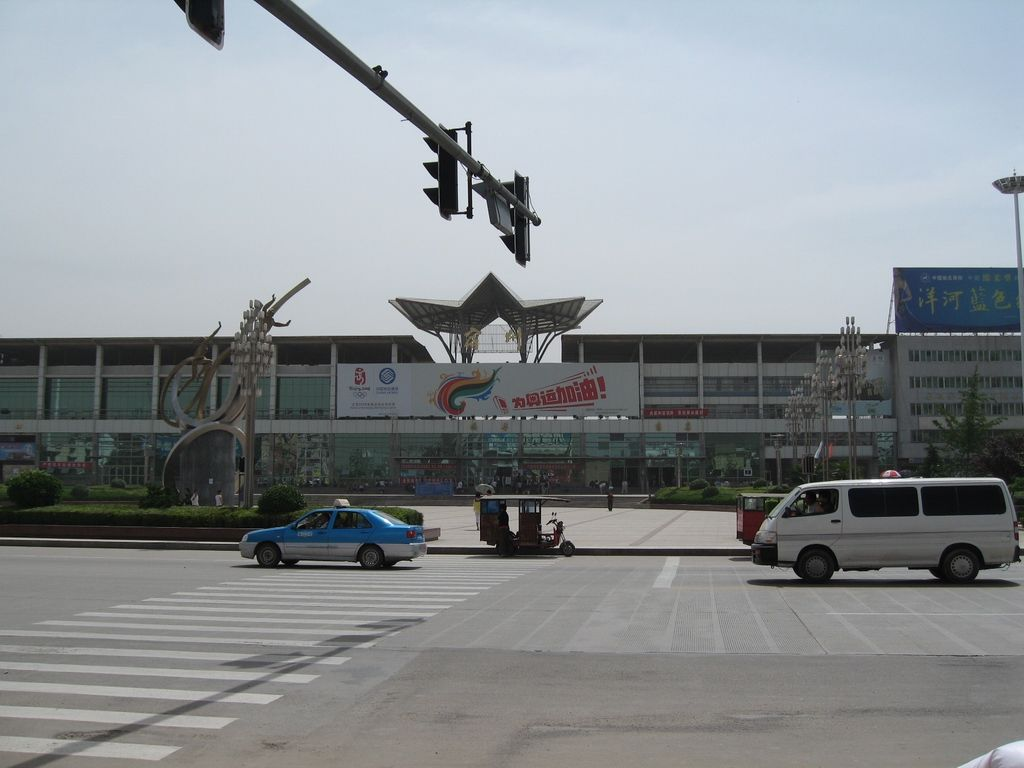

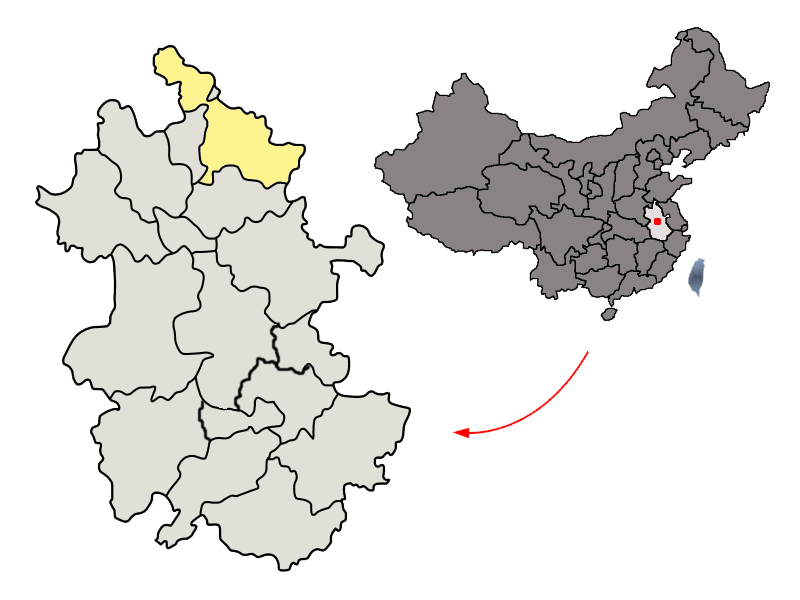
- Coordinates (Suzhou municipal government): 33°38′53″N 116°57′50″E
- Country: People's Republic of China
- Province: Anhui
- County-level divisions: 5
- Township-level divisions: 118
- Municipal seat: Yongqiao District

Government
  - CPC Secretary: Liang Weiguo (梁卫国)
  - Mayor: Tang Chengpei (唐承沛)

Area
  - Prefecture-level city: 9,939.8 km^{2} (3,837.8 sq mi)
  - Urban: 2,906.92 km^{2} (1,122.37 sq mi)
  - Metro: 2,906.92 km^{2} (1,122.37 sq mi)

Population (2020 census)
  - Prefecture-level city: 5,324,476
  - Density: 535.67/km^{2} (1,387.4/sq mi)
  - Urban: 1,766,285
  - Urban density: 607.614/km^{2} (1,573.71/sq mi)
  - Metro: 1,766,285
  - Metro density: 607.614/km^{2} (1,573.71/sq mi)

GDP
  - Prefecture-level city: CN¥ 216.8 billion US$ 28.5 billion
  - Per capita: CN¥ 40,707; US$ 6,310
- Time zone: UTC+8 (China Standard)
- Postal code: 234000
- Area code: 557
- ISO 3166 code: CN-AH-13
- License Plate Prefix: 皖L
- Major Nationalities: Han
- Website: www.ahsz.gov.cn

Suzhou (Chinese: 宿州; pinyin: Sùzhōu) is a prefecture-level city in northern Anhui, China. The city straddles the Tuohe and Xinbian rivers, which fork at its western end. The Tuohe was formerly a left tributary of the Huai River, while the latter is a modern artificial canal, but now both drain into Hongze Lake. It borders the prefectural cities of Huaibei and Bengbu to the southwest and south respectively, and the provinces of Jiangsu to the east, Shandong to the north, and Henan to the northwest.

Its population was 5,324,476 inhabitants at the 2020 census, of whom 1,766,285 lived in the built-up area (or metro) of Yongqiao District, even though that district remains largely rural.

== History ==
Suzhou was formerly Su County (simplified Chinese: 宿县; traditional Chinese: 宿縣; pinyin: Sù Xiàn).

== Administration ==
Suzhou administers five county-level divisions, including one district and four counties.

- Yongqiao District (埇桥区)
- Dangshan County (砀山县)
- Xiao County (萧县)
- Lingbi County (灵璧县)
- Si County (泗县)

Map
Subdivision	Simplified Chinese	Hanyu Pinyin	Population (2020)	Area (km^{2})	Density (/km^{2})
City Proper
Yongqiao District	埇桥区	Yǒngqiáo Qū	1,766,285	2,906	607.9
Rural
Dangshan County	砀山县	Dàngshān Xiàn	765,564	1,205	635.3
Lingbi County	灵璧县	Língbì Xiàn	974,720	2,133	457.0
Si County	泗县	Sì Xiàn	763,310	1,848	413.1
Xiao County	萧县	Xiāo Xiàn	1,054,597	1,847	571.0
Total			5,324,476	9,938	535.8

These are further divided into 118 township-level divisions.

== Climate ==
Suzhou has a monsoon-influenced, humid subtropical climate (Köppen Cwa), with four distinct seasons. Winters are cold and damp, with average low temperatures in January dipping just below freezing; the January 24-hour average temperature is 1.2 °C (34.2 °F). Summers are typically hot and humid, with a July average of 27.6 °C (81.7 °F). The annual mean is 15.2 °C (59.4 °F), while annual precipitation averages about 855.2 millimetres (34 in), a majority of which occurs from May to August.

Climate data for Suzhou, elevation 26 m (85 ft), (1991–2020 normals, extremes 1971–present)
Month	Jan	Feb	Mar	Apr	May	Jun	Jul	Aug	Sep	Oct	Nov	Dec	Year
Record high °C (°F)	20.1 (68.2)	26.3 (79.3)	32.0 (89.6)	34.3 (93.7)	37.6 (99.7)	40.3 (104.5)	40.9 (105.6)	39.8 (103.6)	37.1 (98.8)	35.1 (95.2)	30.0 (86.0)	22.1 (71.8)	40.9 (105.6)
Mean daily maximum °C (°F)	6.3 (43.3)	9.6 (49.3)	14.9 (58.8)	21.4 (70.5)	26.9 (80.4)	29.9 (85.8)	31.6 (88.9)	30.8 (87.4)	27.2 (81.0)	22.5 (72.5)	15.2 (59.4)	8.5 (47.3)	20.4 (68.7)
Daily mean °C (°F)	1.6 (34.9)	4.4 (39.9)	9.5 (49.1)	15.7 (60.3)	21.2 (70.2)	25.4 (77.7)	27.8 (82.0)	26.8 (80.2)	22.4 (72.3)	17.0 (62.6)	9.9 (49.8)	3.6 (38.5)	15.4 (59.8)
Mean daily minimum °C (°F)	−2.0 (28.4)	0.5 (32.9)	4.9 (40.8)	10.4 (50.7)	15.9 (60.6)	21.3 (70.3)	24.6 (76.3)	23.7 (74.7)	18.6 (65.5)	12.6 (54.7)	5.8 (42.4)	−0.1 (31.8)	11.4 (52.4)
Record low °C (°F)	−13.2 (8.2)	−18.1 (−0.6)	−8.2 (17.2)	−1.8 (28.8)	5.3 (41.5)	12.0 (53.6)	16.8 (62.2)	14.6 (58.3)	7.2 (45.0)	−0.5 (31.1)	−7.7 (18.1)	−18.7 (−1.7)	−18.7 (−1.7)
Average precipitation mm (inches)	21.5 (0.85)	26.8 (1.06)	40.0 (1.57)	59.5 (2.34)	77.3 (3.04)	163.5 (6.44)	182.4 (7.18)	121.1 (4.77)	76.3 (3.00)	54.2 (2.13)	37.4 (1.47)	18.2 (0.72)	878.2 (34.57)
Average precipitation days (≥ 0.1 mm)	5.1	6.3	6.6	6.9	7.6	8.7	12.4	11.3	8.6	6.1	6.5	4.6	90.7
Average snowy days	4.0	2.9	1.3	0	0	0	0	0	0	0	0.7	2.0	10.9
Average relative humidity (%)	67	66	66	74	73	76	84	86	82	75	69	68	74
Mean monthly sunshine hours	148.1	147.2	182.6	209.5	217.8	200.2	192.9	195.1	180.5	186.0	160.5	154.1	2,174.5
Percentage possible sunshine	47	47	49	53	51	47	44	48	49	54	52	50	49
Source 1: China Meteorological Administration
Source 2: Weather China

== Festivals ==
Sacrifice to The Kitchen God (祭灶)
This festival is the traditional lunar festival of East Asia, celebrated in Suzhou. People think this festival is to give presents to gods. In Suzhou, this festival is celebrated by offering food and burning incense on a table and baijiu on the floor to worship the gods. This food is left untouched for, more or less, one day. Also, some food is shared with family and friends.

Pear Flower Festival (梨花节)
There are many pear trees in Suzhou and when their flowers bloom people get together to appreciate it and have a picnic. At night there is a festival program on Anhui TV to show how beautiful it is.

Sacred Stone Festival (奇石节)
Suzhou Lingbi Sacred Stone Festival aims to promote the charming and admirable Lingbi sculptures. This festival expands the economy, sets up an investment promotion platform, promotes Suzhou economic and social development, and enhances its visibility and reputation. People get together and show their unique and beautiful stones. They can be viewed at the Suzhou QiShi Museum. The city mayor chooses the best one to be sent to the National Museum of China.

== Tourist Attractions ==
Huangzangyu National Forest Park

Anhui Huangzangyu National Forest Park is located in the denuded low hills in the south of the Taoxu Mountain System. The mountain rocks are limestone bodies, and there are many natural caves, well springs, and rock landscapes. The highest peak is Pingdingshan, 389 meters above sea level, and the general peak height is between 100 and 300 meters.

Zhong Kui Wine Culture Museum

Zhongkui Wine Culture Museum is located in Lingbi County Economic Development Zone.

It is a typical Huizhou building, with white walls, black tiles and horse head walls, Zhongkui Hall in the courtyard and corridor, towering towers and pavilions, small bridges and flowing water houses, strange rocks, trees, and a total area of more than 3,000 square meters, with a total construction area of more than 1,000 square meters, of which the main exhibition hall - "Zhong Kui Wine Culture Museum" has an exhibition area of more than 500 square meters, consisting of a gatehouse, curved corridors and the main exhibition hall. The decorative display in the main exhibition hall borrows the architectural elements of Huizhou style and coexists harmoniously with the external environment, complementing each other, the whole is smooth and smooth, and the ancient charm is vivid. The display content of the entire main exhibition hall consists of five parts.
