= Sihong County =

Sihong 泗洪县 Szehung
- County
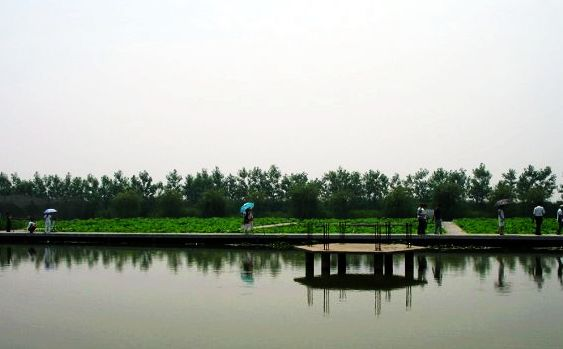
- Park in Sihong County

- Location in Jiangsu
- Coordinates: 33°27′54″N 118°12′22″E
- Country: People's Republic of China
- Province: Jiangsu
- Prefecture-level city: Suqian

Area
  - Total: 2,731 km^{2} (1,054 sq mi)

Population (2020 census)
  - Total: 858,740
  - Density: 314.4/km^{2} (814.4/sq mi)
- Time zone: UTC+8 (China Standard)
- Postal code: 223900

Sihong County (simplified Chinese: 泗洪县; traditional Chinese: 泗洪縣; pinyin: Sìhóng Xiàn) is under the administration of Suqian, Jiangsu province, China. It borders the prefecture-level cities of Huai'an to the southeast, Chuzhou (Anhui) to the south, Bengbu (Anhui) to the west, and Suzhou (Anhui) to the northwest.

== History ==
The area that later became Sihong County probably served as center for the state of Xu during Spring and Autumn period, and harbored its capital city.

== Administrative divisions ==
At present, Sihong County has 14 towns and 9 townships under its jurisdiction.

14 towns

- Qingyang (青阳镇)
- Shuanggou (双沟镇)
- Shangtang (上塘镇)
- Weiying (魏营镇)
- Bancheng (临淮镇)
- Bancheng (半城镇)
- Sunyuan (孙园镇)
- Meihua (梅花镇)
- Guiren (归仁镇)
- Jinsuo (金锁镇)
- Zhuhu (朱湖镇)
- Jieji (界集镇)
- Taiping (太平镇)
- Longji (龙集镇)

9 townships

- Sihe (四河乡)
- Fengshan (峰山乡)
- Caomiao (曹庙乡)
- Chemen (车门乡)
- Yaogou (瑶沟乡)
- Shiji (石集乡)
- Chengtou (城头乡)
- Chenxu (陈圩乡)
- Tianganghu (天岗湖乡)

== Climate ==
Climate data for Sihong, elevation 17 m (56 ft), (1991–2020 normals, extremes 1981–present)
Month	Jan	Feb	Mar	Apr	May	Jun	Jul	Aug	Sep	Oct	Nov	Dec	Year
Record high °C (°F)	21.3 (70.3)	26.3 (79.3)	33.6 (92.5)	33.4 (92.1)	37.4 (99.3)	38.5 (101.3)	41.3 (106.3)	39.1 (102.4)	37.3 (99.1)	34.1 (93.4)	28.7 (83.7)	21.3 (70.3)	41.3 (106.3)
Mean daily maximum °C (°F)	6.1 (43.0)	9.1 (48.4)	14.4 (57.9)	21.0 (69.8)	26.1 (79.0)	29.7 (85.5)	31.6 (88.9)	30.8 (87.4)	27.1 (80.8)	22.1 (71.8)	15.2 (59.4)	8.5 (47.3)	20.1 (68.3)
Daily mean °C (°F)	1.3 (34.3)	4.1 (39.4)	9.2 (48.6)	15.5 (59.9)	20.9 (69.6)	25.0 (77.0)	27.7 (81.9)	26.9 (80.4)	22.4 (72.3)	16.6 (61.9)	9.8 (49.6)	3.5 (38.3)	15.2 (59.4)
Mean daily minimum °C (°F)	−2.5 (27.5)	0.0 (32.0)	4.5 (40.1)	10.3 (50.5)	15.9 (60.6)	20.7 (69.3)	24.4 (75.9)	23.7 (74.7)	18.6 (65.5)	12.1 (53.8)	5.4 (41.7)	−0.5 (31.1)	11.1 (51.9)
Record low °C (°F)	−20.7 (−5.3)	−17.2 (1.0)	−9.0 (15.8)	−1.8 (28.8)	4.7 (40.5)	10.5 (50.9)	18.0 (64.4)	14.4 (57.9)	8.3 (46.9)	−0.4 (31.3)	−8.5 (16.7)	−19.6 (−3.3)	−20.7 (−5.3)
Average precipitation mm (inches)	27.5 (1.08)	32.0 (1.26)	45.9 (1.81)	50.2 (1.98)	76.0 (2.99)	137.3 (5.41)	223.2 (8.79)	158.3 (6.23)	94.8 (3.73)	46.4 (1.83)	42.3 (1.67)	22.5 (0.89)	956.4 (37.67)
Average precipitation days (≥ 0.1 mm)	6.0	7.0	7.5	7.4	8.2	9.1	13.0	11.7	8.1	6.3	6.9	5.5	96.7
Average snowy days	3.6	2.5	1.1	0	0	0	0	0	0	0	0.6	1.3	9.1
Average relative humidity (%)	71	70	67	67	70	73	82	84	80	75	73	71	74
Mean monthly sunshine hours	139.0	138.5	172.7	198.2	204.8	174.6	181.6	183.1	174.7	173.5	148.5	145.0	2,034.2
Percentage possible sunshine	44	44	46	51	47	41	42	45	48	50	48	47	46
Source: China Meteorological Administration all-time January high
