= Si County =

Coordinates: 33°33′03″N 117°51′38″E

Sixian 泗县
- County
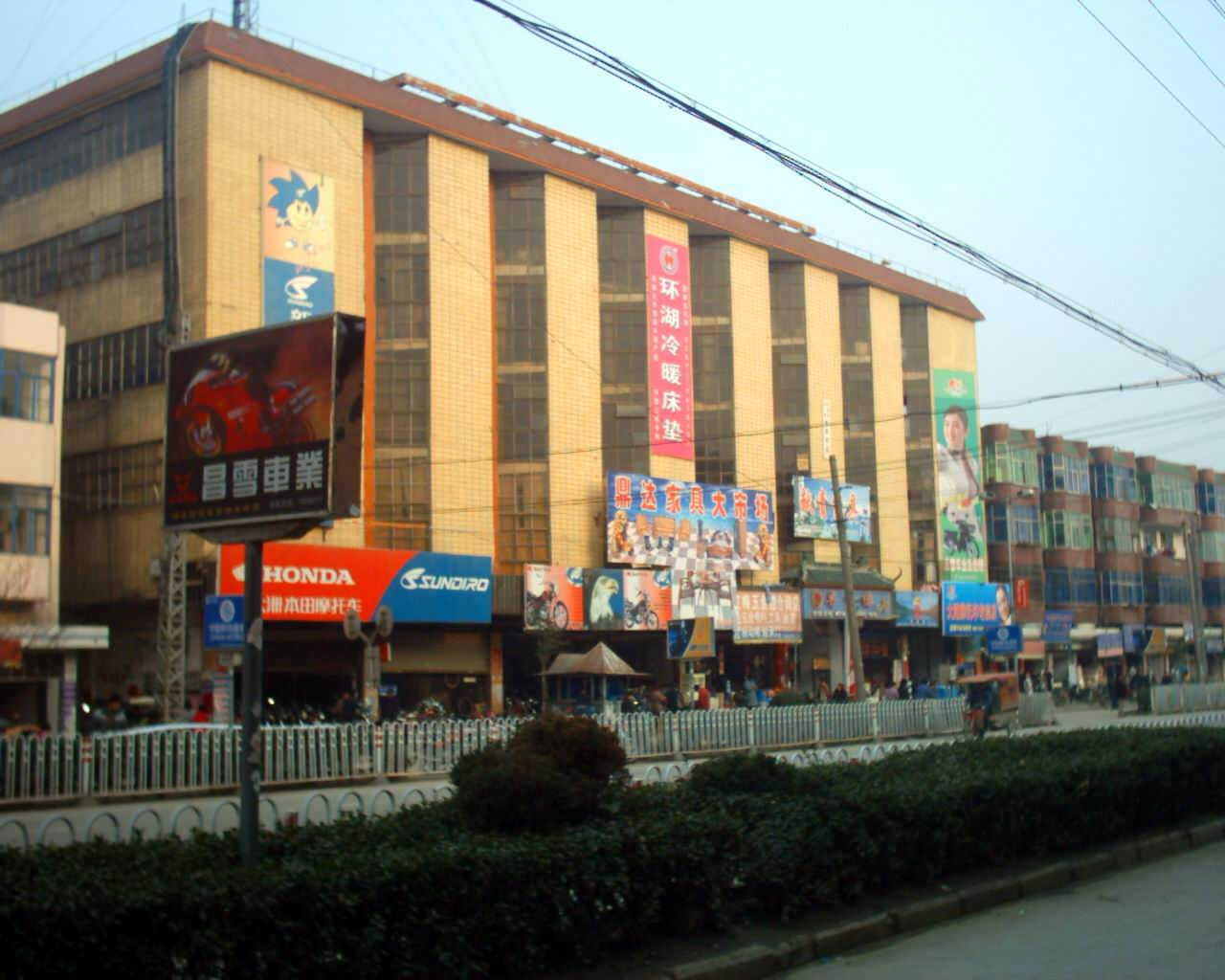
- Interactive map of Sixian
- Country: People's Republic of China
- Province: Anhui
- Prefecture-level city: Suzhou

Area
  - Total: 1,787 km^{2} (690 sq mi)

Population (2018)
  - Total: 851,000
- Time zone: UTC+8 (China Standard)
- Postal code: 234300

Si County
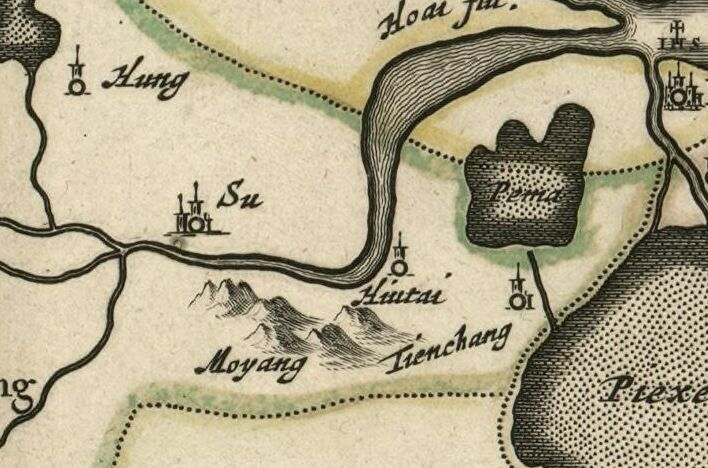
- Si ("Su"), Sixian's imperial predecessor, shown as a subprefecture of Fengyang in Martino Martini's 1655 Novus Atlas Sinensis
- Traditional Chinese: 泗縣
- Simplified Chinese: 泗县
- Literal meaning: Si River County; Si River county seat
Transcriptions
Standard Mandarin
- Hanyu Pinyin: Sìxiàn; Sì xiàn
- Wade–Giles: Ssu-hsien; Ssu Hsien

Si County or Sixian is a county in northeast Anhui Province, China. It borders the northern part of Jiangsu Province to the north and east and is under the administration of the prefecture-level city of Suzhou.

== Name ==
Si County is named for the Si River and preserves the name of the earlier Si Prefecture and Subprefecture which administered the area during the imperial period, sometimes from Si County and sometimes from nearby areas in what is now Jiangsu.

== Administrative divisions ==
In the present, Si County has 12 towns and 3 townships.

12 Towns

- Sicheng (泗城镇)
- Pingshan (屏山镇)
- Huangxu (黄圩镇)
- Dazhuang (大庄镇)
- Shantou (山头镇)
- Liuxu (刘圩镇)
- Heita (黑塔镇)
- Caomiao (草庙镇)
- Caogou (草沟镇)
- Dunji (墩集镇)
- Dinghu (丁湖镇)
- Changgou (长沟镇)

3 Townships

- Dalukou (大路口乡)
- Dayang (大杨乡)
- Wafang (瓦坊乡)

== Climate ==
Climate data for Sixian, elevation 18 m (59 ft), (1991–2020 normals, extremes 1981–present)
Month	Jan	Feb	Mar	Apr	May	Jun	Jul	Aug	Sep	Oct	Nov	Dec	Year
Record high °C (°F)	19.3 (66.7)	26.9 (80.4)	33.4 (92.1)	33.2 (91.8)	37.9 (100.2)	38.6 (101.5)	41.7 (107.1)	38.2 (100.8)	36.4 (97.5)	34.6 (94.3)	28.6 (83.5)	21.8 (71.2)	41.7 (107.1)
Mean daily maximum °C (°F)	6.2 (43.2)	9.3 (48.7)	14.6 (58.3)	21.1 (70.0)	26.4 (79.5)	30.2 (86.4)	31.9 (89.4)	31.0 (87.8)	27.4 (81.3)	22.4 (72.3)	15.3 (59.5)	8.6 (47.5)	20.4 (68.7)
Daily mean °C (°F)	1.4 (34.5)	4.2 (39.6)	9.2 (48.6)	15.5 (59.9)	20.9 (69.6)	25.1 (77.2)	27.7 (81.9)	26.8 (80.2)	22.5 (72.5)	16.8 (62.2)	10.0 (50.0)	3.5 (38.3)	15.3 (59.5)
Mean daily minimum °C (°F)	−2.2 (28.0)	0.2 (32.4)	4.6 (40.3)	10.4 (50.7)	16.0 (60.8)	20.7 (69.3)	24.3 (75.7)	23.6 (74.5)	18.8 (65.8)	12.5 (54.5)	5.8 (42.4)	−0.3 (31.5)	11.2 (52.2)
Record low °C (°F)	−18.5 (−1.3)	−17.4 (0.7)	−9.3 (15.3)	−1.5 (29.3)	4.4 (39.9)	11.5 (52.7)	17.5 (63.5)	15.0 (59.0)	8.2 (46.8)	−0.5 (31.1)	−8.3 (17.1)	−19.6 (−3.3)	−19.6 (−3.3)
Average precipitation mm (inches)	26.8 (1.06)	30.6 (1.20)	46.0 (1.81)	48.3 (1.90)	76.0 (2.99)	132.8 (5.23)	210.0 (8.27)	158.0 (6.22)	81.8 (3.22)	52.5 (2.07)	40.2 (1.58)	21.2 (0.83)	924.2 (36.38)
Average precipitation days (≥ 0.1 mm)	5.5	6.9	7.2	7.4	7.8	9.2	13.2	11.7	8.3	6.3	7.1	5.3	95.9
Average snowy days	3.6	2.7	1.3	0	0	0	0	0	0	0	0.6	1.3	9.5
Average relative humidity (%)	70	69	68	69	71	73	82	83	79	73	72	71	73
Mean monthly sunshine hours	139.6	140.7	173.7	201.1	204.4	178.4	191.7	192.1	178.0	177.2	151.8	151.5	2,080.2
Percentage possible sunshine	44	45	47	51	47	42	44	47	48	51	49	49	47
Source: China Meteorological Administration
