= Huai River =

River in Central China

Huai River Huai He
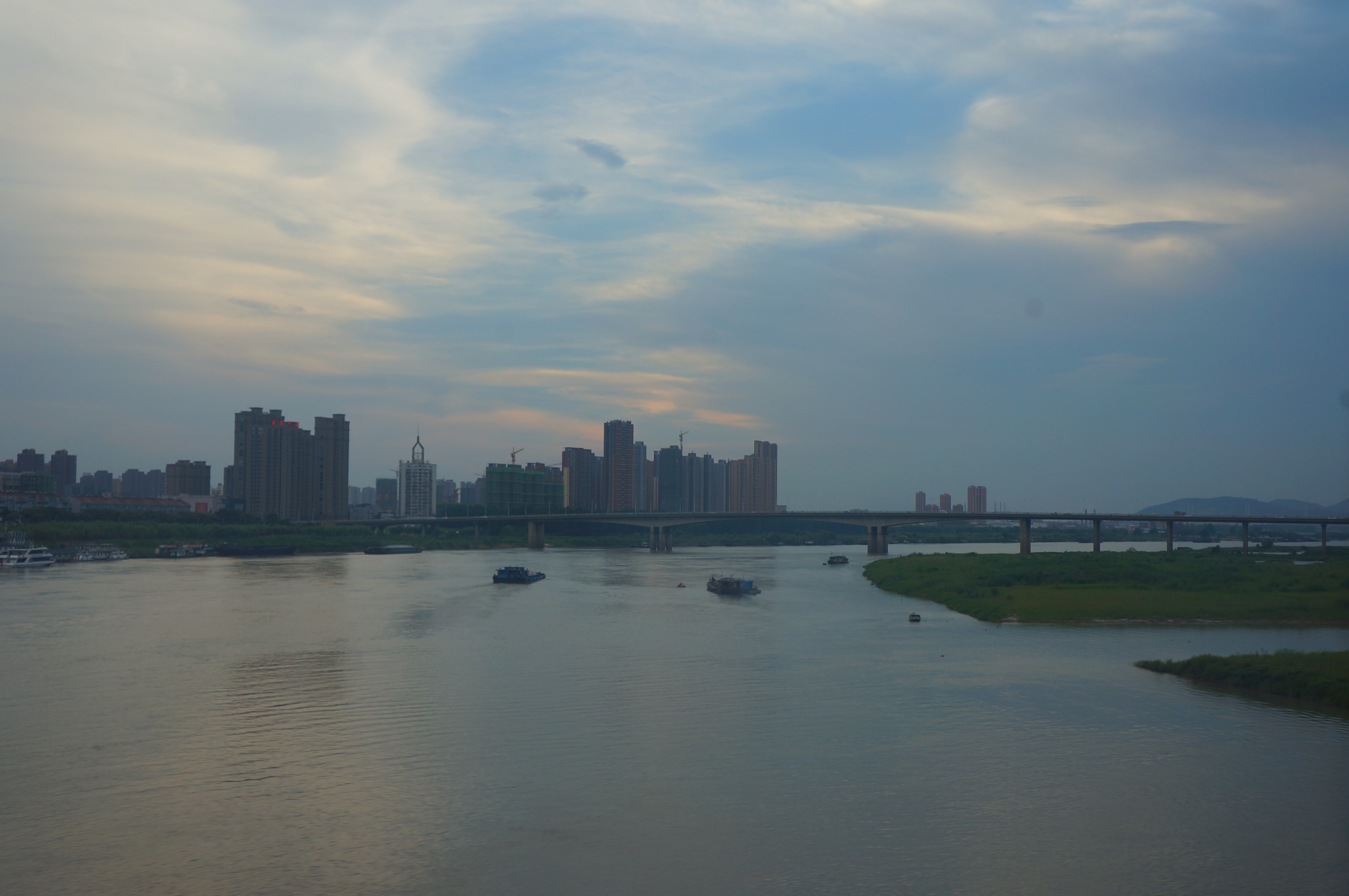
- Huai River in the city of Bengbu, Anhui.

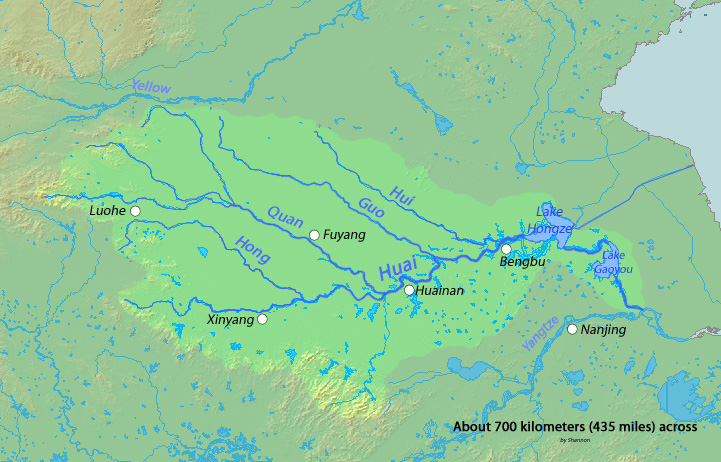
- Map of the Huai River and its major tributaries.
- Native name: 淮河

Location
- Country: China
- Provinces: Henan, Anhui, Jiangsu
- Cities: Xinyang, Fuyang, Lu'an, Huainan, Bengbu, Tianchang, Huai'an, Yangzhou

Physical characteristics
- Source: Tongbai Mountain
  - location: Nanyang, Henan
  - coordinates: 32°22′52″N 113°16′35″E
  - elevation: 1,029 m (3,376 ft)
- Mouth: Yangtze
  - location: Yangzhou, Jiangsu
  - coordinates: 32°18′28″N 119°42′13″E
  - elevation: 0 m (0 ft)
- Length: 1,110 km (690 mi)
- Basin size: 174,000 km^{2} (67,000 sq mi)
- Discharge
  - average: 1,616 m^{3}/s (57,100 cu ft/s) Note, this is the main discharge into the Yangtze, 82.0% of the total water flow of all Huai waters.

Basin features
- Progression: Yangtze → East China Sea

The Huai River, formerly romanized as the Hwai, is a major river in East China, about 1,110 km (690 mi) long with a drainage area of 174,000 km^{2} (67,000 sq mi). It is located about midway between the Yellow River and Yangtze River, the two longest rivers and largest drainage basins in China. Historically draining eastwards directly into the Yellow Sea, erosion from floods have changed the course of the river such that it now primarily discharges into the Yangtze. The Huai River is, to this day, notoriously vulnerable to flooding.

The Qinling–Huaihe Line, formed by the Huai River and the Qin Mountains, is sometimes regarded as the geographical dividing line between northern and southern China. This line approximates the 0 °C (32 °F) January isotherm and the 800 millimeters (30 in) isohyet in China.

== Course ==
The Huai River originates in Tongbai Mountain in Henan province. It flows through southern Henan, northern Anhui, and northern Jiangsu where it pools into Lake Hongze. Nowadays the Huai River then runs southwards as the Sanhe River by way of the Gaoyou Lake and Shaobo Lake, emptying into the Yangtze River at Sanjiangying (三江营) near Yangzhou.

There is also a passage called the Huaihe Sea Entryway and Subei Irrigation Canal that passes Huai'an and empties into the sea at Biandan Port. A separate course runs north by way of the Huaimu River and Huai Shu River and connects the Huai River system with the Xinyi River (part of the Yishusi River system) which exits into the sea at Guanyun in Lianyungang.

In part to circumvent flooding, in Jiangsu province the Huai River system is interconnected with different waterways and thereby forms part of the Grand Canal.

== History ==
Pictorial map showing the Huai Basin between the Yangtze (top) and Yellow (bottom) rivers, 1736.

Historically, the Huai River entered the Yellow Sea at Yunti Pass (modern day Yunti Village, in Huangwei Town of Xiangshui County) through a broad and level lower course. It was long used to irrigate the surrounding farmlands, and was the center of an extensive network of canals and tributaries.

Huai River
- Chinese: 淮河
- Hanyu Pinyin: Huái Hé
- Postal: Hwai Ho
Transcriptions
Standard Mandarin
- Hanyu Pinyin: Huái Hé
- Bopomofo: ㄏㄨㄞˊ ㄏㄜˊ
- Gwoyeu Romatzyh: Hwai Her
- Wade–Giles: Huai^{2} Ho^{2}
- IPA: [xwǎɪ xɤ̌]

Beginning in 1194, however, the Yellow River to the north repeatedly changed its course southwards to run into the Huai River. The resulting silting was so heavy that after the Yellow River changed back to its northerly course for the most recent time in 1897, the geography of the Huai River basin was changed significantly by the creation of new high lands, lakes, and the built-up silt of the Yellow River's historical southern course. As a result, water from the midsection of the river could not easily flow into the lower section, while water in the lower section could not find an outlet to the sea. The problem worsened in the Second Sino-Japanese War, when the Nationalist government, in an attempt to check the pace of the Japanese invasion, flooded the lower Huai basin by opening the Yellow River's southern levee. The main stem of the Yellow River flowed through the levee breach for the next nine years, further disrupting the Huai river system.

The result of these changes was that water from the Huai River pooled up into Lake Hongze, and then ran southwards towards the Yangtze River. Major and minor floods occurred frequently, with the area suffering droughts in between floods. In the 450 years to 1950, the Huai River saw, on average, 94 major floods per century.

Attempts to solve the Huai River's problems have focused on building outlets for the Huai River into the Yangtze River and the sea. Currently, the major part of the river's flow enters the Yangtze River via Lake Hongze. The North Jiangsu Main Irrigation Canal also diverts some of its water along its old historical course to the sea, and is planned to be upgraded with a new parallel channel. Several former tributaries also carry some water to the sea.

== Tributaries ==
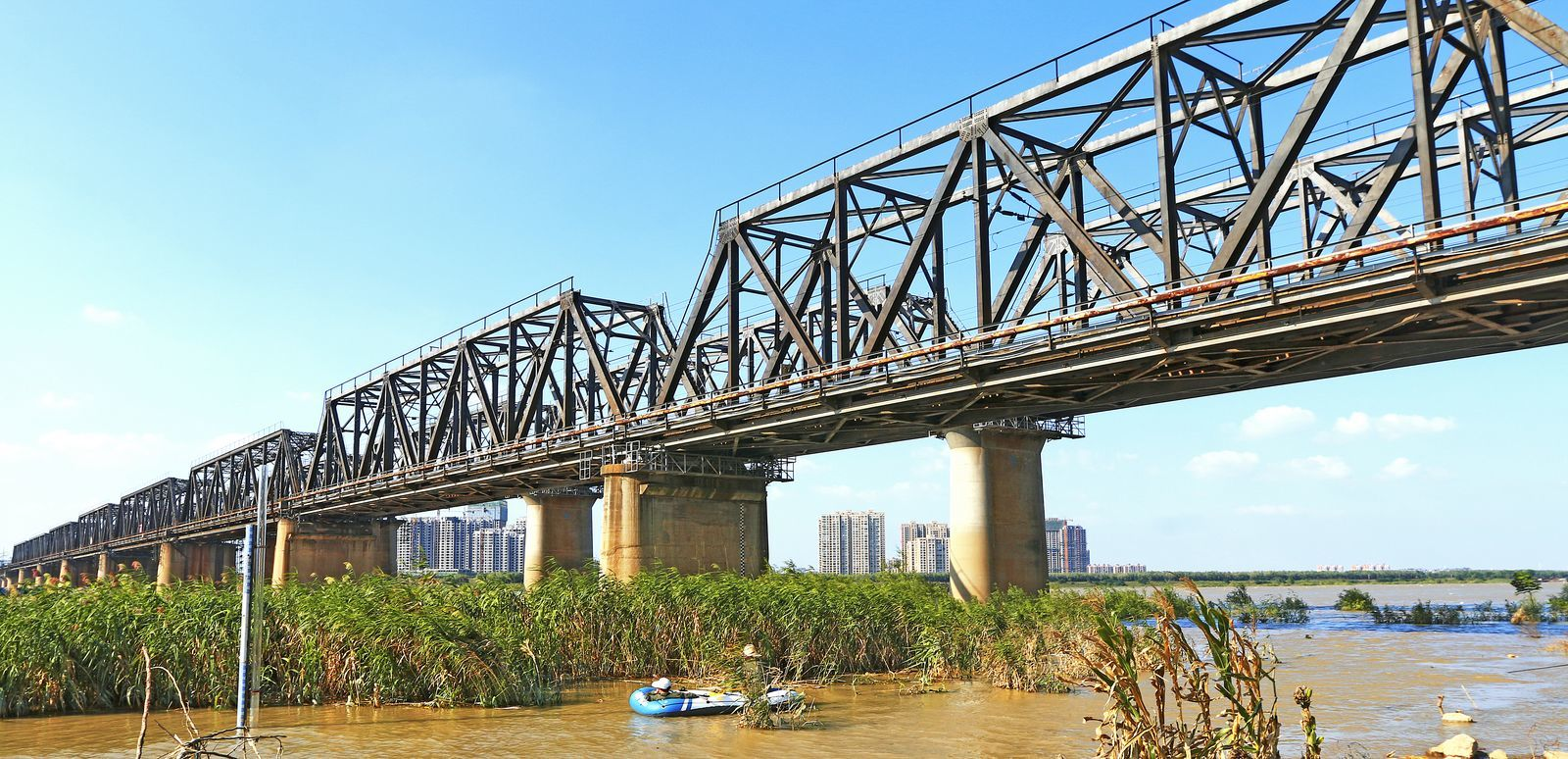
The Bengbu Railway Bridge

There are many tributaries of the Huai River. There are 15 main tributaries cover an area of more than 2,000 square kilometers (770 sq mi) each, and 21 main tributaries have a catchment area larger than 1,000 square kilometers (390 sq mi).

The main tributaries on the Huai River (listed from upstream to downstream) are as follows:

North bank	South bank
Hong River (洪河)	You River (游河)
Ying River (潁河)	Shi River (浉河 [河流])
Xi Fei River (西淝河)	Zhu Gan River (竹竿河)
Guo River (涡河)	Zhai River (寨河)
Xin Bian River (新汴河)	Huang River (潢河)
Kui Sui River (奎濉河)	Bai Lu River (白露河)
	Shiguan River (史灌河)
	Pi He River (...)
	Dong Fei River (东淝河)
	Chi River (池河 [淮河])

== Water quality and clean up efforts ==
The Huai River basin faces the most severe pollution and disturbance of all Chinese river basins. Low water quality can largely be attributed to point source pollution emission, flow disruption from dams, and increased water temperature related to changes in land use. Since clean up efforts began in 1994, water quality has steadily improved, but some areas remain unsuitable sources for drinking water. Intensive monitoring systems have been utilized to try an understand the extent and nature of the issue.

Several large efforts to improve the water quality of the Huai River and its tributaries have been made. In 1994 the Huai River basin featured as the first of several regions in a national effort to deal with water pollution. Unfortunately, some of these efforts were undone by intense flooding in the region in 2004. By that point, over US$2.4 billion had been invested into the effort, and roughly 60% of the river was still undrinkable.

In 2000 China secured over US$100 million from the World Bank, to help fund the Huai River Pollution Control Project. The project began immediately with the stated purpose of supporting "Government efforts to upgrade water quality in the Huai River Basin (one of the most polluted river systems in China), in particular in the provinces of Anhui and Shandong." Most of the funds went towards developing wastewater treatment infrastructure and combating industrial pollution. By 2008, the project had exceeded its target expectations, treating 70% to 90% of domestic wastewater (depending on location), providing institutional support and training for the sector, and significantly improving water quality overall. Other projects have aimed to improving the efficiency of water regulation method (such as sluice gates), constructing wetlands, and the relocation and resettlement of some areas.

In the 2010s water management continued to develop with increased monitoring, regulation, and standardized practices. By 2020 roughly 80% of the river system was graded safe for fishing, swimming, and inclusion in drinking water systems. The extended nature of the effort to clean up the Huai River has made it regular case study in of water quality improvement research.
