= List of administrative divisions of Jiangsu =

Jiangsu Province
- Province
- Capital: Nanjing

Prefecture-level divisions
- Sub-provincial cities: 1
- Prefectural cities: 12

County level divisions
- County cities: 21
- Counties: 19
- Districts: 55

Township level divisions
- Towns: 876
- Townships: 105
- Ethnic townships: 1
- Subdistricts: 330

Villages level divisions
- Communities: 7,139
- Administrative villages: 14,475

Prefecture-level cities of Jiangsu

Jiangsu, a province of the People's Republic of China, is made up of three levels of administrative division: prefectures, counties, and townships.

== Administrative divisions ==
All of these administrative divisions are explained in greater detail at Administrative divisions of the People's Republic of China. This chart lists only prefecture-level and county-level divisions of Jiangsu.

Prefecture level	County Level				
Prefecture level	Name	Chinese	Hanyu Pinyin	Division code	
Nanjing city 南京市; Nánjīng Shì (Capital – Sub-provincial) (3201 / NKG)	Xuanwu District	玄武区	Xuánwǔ Qū	320102	XWU
Nanjing city 南京市; Nánjīng Shì (Capital – Sub-provincial) (3201 / NKG)	Qinhuai District	秦淮区	Qínhuái Qū	320104	QHU
Nanjing city 南京市; Nánjīng Shì (Capital – Sub-provincial) (3201 / NKG)	Jianye District	建邺区	Jiànyè Qū	320105	JYQ
Nanjing city 南京市; Nánjīng Shì (Capital – Sub-provincial) (3201 / NKG)	Gulou District	鼓楼区	Gǔlóu Qū	320106	GLQ
Nanjing city 南京市; Nánjīng Shì (Capital – Sub-provincial) (3201 / NKG)	Pukou District	浦口区	Pǔkǒu Qū	320111	PKO
Nanjing city 南京市; Nánjīng Shì (Capital – Sub-provincial) (3201 / NKG)	Qixia District	栖霞区	Qīxiá Qū	320113	QXA
Nanjing city 南京市; Nánjīng Shì (Capital – Sub-provincial) (3201 / NKG)	Yuhuatai District	雨花台区	Yǔhuātái Qū	320114	YHT
Nanjing city 南京市; Nánjīng Shì (Capital – Sub-provincial) (3201 / NKG)	Jiangning District	江宁区	Jiāngníng Qū	320115	JNN
Nanjing city 南京市; Nánjīng Shì (Capital – Sub-provincial) (3201 / NKG)	Luhe District	六合区	Lùhé Qū	320116	LHE
Nanjing city 南京市; Nánjīng Shì (Capital – Sub-provincial) (3201 / NKG)	Lishui District	溧水区	Lìshuǐ Qū	320117	LDS
Nanjing city 南京市; Nánjīng Shì (Capital – Sub-provincial) (3201 / NKG)	Gaochun District	高淳区	Gāochún Qū	320118	GCU
Wuxi city 无锡市; Wúxī Shì (3202 / WUX)	Xishan District	锡山区	Xīshān Qū	320205	XSW
Wuxi city 无锡市; Wúxī Shì (3202 / WUX)	Huishan District	惠山区	Huìshān Qū	320206	HSU
Wuxi city 无锡市; Wúxī Shì (3202 / WUX)	Binhu District	滨湖区	Bīnhú Qū	320211	BNH
Wuxi city 无锡市; Wúxī Shì (3202 / WUX)	Liangxi District	梁溪区	Liángxī Qū	320213	LXB
Wuxi city 无锡市; Wúxī Shì (3202 / WUX)	Xinwu District	新吴区	Xīnwú Qū	320214	XIW
Wuxi city 无锡市; Wúxī Shì (3202 / WUX)	Jiangyin city	江阴市	Jiāngyīn Shì	320281	JIA
Wuxi city 无锡市; Wúxī Shì (3202 / WUX)	Yixing city	宜兴市	Yíxīng Shì	320282	YIX
Xuzhou city 徐州市; Xúzhōu Shì (3203 / XUZ)	Gulou District	鼓楼区	Gǔlóu Qū	320302	GLU
Xuzhou city 徐州市; Xúzhōu Shì (3203 / XUZ)	Yunlong District	云龙区	Yúnlóng Qū	320303	YLF
Xuzhou city 徐州市; Xúzhōu Shì (3203 / XUZ)	Jiawang District	贾汪区	Jiǎwāng Qū	320305	JWQ
Xuzhou city 徐州市; Xúzhōu Shì (3203 / XUZ)	Quanshan District	泉山区	Quánshān Qū	320311	QSX
Xuzhou city 徐州市; Xúzhōu Shì (3203 / XUZ)	Tongshan District	铜山区	Tóngshān Qū	320312	TSN
Xuzhou city 徐州市; Xúzhōu Shì (3203 / XUZ)	Fengxian County (Note: Official name registered by the Ministry of Civil Affairs.)	丰县	Fēngxiàn	320321	FXN
Xuzhou city 徐州市; Xúzhōu Shì (3203 / XUZ)	Peixian County	沛县	Pèixiàn	320322	PEI
Xuzhou city 徐州市; Xúzhōu Shì (3203 / XUZ)	Suining County	睢宁县	Suīníng Xiàn	320324	SNI
Xuzhou city 徐州市; Xúzhōu Shì (3203 / XUZ)	Xinyi city	新沂市	Xīnyí Shì	320381	XYW
Xuzhou city 徐州市; Xúzhōu Shì (3203 / XUZ)	Pizhou city	邳州市	Pīzhōu Shì	320382	PZO
Changzhou city 常州市; Chángzhōu Shì (3204 / CZX)	Tianning District	天宁区	Tiānníng Qū	320402	TNQ
Changzhou city 常州市; Chángzhōu Shì (3204 / CZX)	Zhonglou District	钟楼区	Zhōnglóu Qū	320404	ZLQ
Changzhou city 常州市; Chángzhōu Shì (3204 / CZX)	Xinbei District	新北区	Xīnběi Qū	320411	XBQ
Changzhou city 常州市; Chángzhōu Shì (3204 / CZX)	Wujin District	武进区	Wǔjìn Qū	320412	WJN
Changzhou city 常州市; Chángzhōu Shì (3204 / CZX)	Jintan District	金坛区	Jīntán Qū	320413	JTN
Changzhou city 常州市; Chángzhōu Shì (3204 / CZX)	Liyang city	溧阳市	Lìyáng Shì	320481	LYR
Suzhou city 苏州市; Sūzhōu Shì (3205 / SZH)	Huqiu District	虎丘区	Hǔqiū Qū	320505	HUQ
Suzhou city 苏州市; Sūzhōu Shì (3205 / SZH)	Wuzhong District	吴中区	Wúzhōng Qū	320506	WZQ
Suzhou city 苏州市; Sūzhōu Shì (3205 / SZH)	Xiangcheng District	相城区	Xiàngchéng Qū	320507	XAU
Suzhou city 苏州市; Sūzhōu Shì (3205 / SZH)	Gusu District	姑苏区	Gūsū Qū	320508	GSU
Suzhou city 苏州市; Sūzhōu Shì (3205 / SZH)	Wujiang District	吴江区	Wújiāng Qū	320509	WJU
Suzhou city 苏州市; Sūzhōu Shì (3205 / SZH)	Changshu city	常熟市	Chángshú Shì	320581	CGS
Suzhou city 苏州市; Sūzhōu Shì (3205 / SZH)	Zhangjiagang city	张家港市	Zhāngjiāgǎng Shì	320582	ZJG
Suzhou city 苏州市; Sūzhōu Shì (3205 / SZH)	Kunshan city	昆山市	Kūnshān Shì	320583	KUS
Suzhou city 苏州市; Sūzhōu Shì (3205 / SZH)	Taicang city	太仓市	Tàicāng Shì	320585	TAC
Nantong city 南通市; Nántōng Shì (3206 / NTG)	Chongchuan District	崇川区	Chóngchuān Qū	320602	CCQ
Nantong city 南通市; Nántōng Shì (3206 / NTG)	Tongzhou District	通州区	Tōngzhōu Qū	320612	TZT
Nantong city 南通市; Nántōng Shì (3206 / NTG)	Haimen District	海门区	Hǎimén Qū	320613	
Nantong city 南通市; Nántōng Shì (3206 / NTG)	Rudong County	如东县	Rúdōng Xiàn	320623	RDG
Nantong city 南通市; Nántōng Shì (3206 / NTG)	Qidong city (Note: The Suyan Islet (Socotra Rock) are claimed by the PRC as a part of Qidong in Nantong, also claimed by South Korea and possibly claimed by Japan.)	启东市	Qǐdōng Shì	320681	QID
Nantong city 南通市; Nántōng Shì (3206 / NTG)	Rugao city	如皋市	Rúgāo Shì	320682	RGO
Nantong city 南通市; Nántōng Shì (3206 / NTG)	Hai'an city	海安市	Hǎi'ān Shì	320685	
Lianyungang city 连云港市; Liányúngǎng Shì (3207 / LYG)	Lianyun District	连云区	Liányún Qū	320703	LYB
Lianyungang city 连云港市; Liányúngǎng Shì (3207 / LYG)	Haizhou District	海州区	Hǎizhōu Qū	320706	HIZ
Lianyungang city 连云港市; Liányúngǎng Shì (3207 / LYG)	Ganyu District	赣榆区	Gànyú Qū	320707	GYB
Lianyungang city 连云港市; Liányúngǎng Shì (3207 / LYG)	Donghai County	东海县	Dōnghǎi Xiàn	320722	DHX
Lianyungang city 连云港市; Liányúngǎng Shì (3207 / LYG)	Guanyun County	灌云县	Guànyún Xiàn	320723	GYS
Lianyungang city 连云港市; Liányúngǎng Shì (3207 / LYG)	Guannan County	灌南县	Guànnán Xiàn	320724	GUN
Huai'an city 淮安市; Huái'ān Shì (3208 / HAS)	Huai'an District	淮安区	Huái'ān Qū	320803	HAA
Huai'an city 淮安市; Huái'ān Shì (3208 / HAS)	Huaiyin District	淮阴区	Huáiyīn Qū	320804	HUU
Huai'an city 淮安市; Huái'ān Shì (3208 / HAS)	Qingjiangpu District	清江浦区	Qīngjiāngpǔ Qū	320812	QJP
Huai'an city 淮安市; Huái'ān Shì (3208 / HAS)	Hongze District	洪泽区	Hóngzé Qū	320813	HZK
Huai'an city 淮安市; Huái'ān Shì (3208 / HAS)	Lianshui County	涟水县	Liánshuǐ Xiàn	320826	LSI
Huai'an city 淮安市; Huái'ān Shì (3208 / HAS)	Xuyi County	盱眙县	Xūyí Xiàn	320830	XUY
Huai'an city 淮安市; Huái'ān Shì (3208 / HAS)	Jinhu County	金湖县	Jīnhú Xiàn	320831	JHU
Yancheng city 盐城市; Yánchéng Shì (3209 / YCK)	Tinghu District	亭湖区	Tínghú Qū	320902	TNH
Yancheng city 盐城市; Yánchéng Shì (3209 / YCK)	Yandu District	盐都区	Yándū Qū	320903	YDU
Yancheng city 盐城市; Yánchéng Shì (3209 / YCK)	Dafeng District	大丰区	Dàfēng Qū	320904	DFE
Yancheng city 盐城市; Yánchéng Shì (3209 / YCK)	Xiangshui County	响水县	Xiǎngshuǐ Xiàn	320921	XSH
Yancheng city 盐城市; Yánchéng Shì (3209 / YCK)	Binhai County	滨海县	Bīnhǎi Xiàn	320922	BHI
Yancheng city 盐城市; Yánchéng Shì (3209 / YCK)	Funing County	阜宁县	Fùníng Xiàn	320923	FNG
Yancheng city 盐城市; Yánchéng Shì (3209 / YCK)	Sheyang County	射阳县	Shèyáng Xiàn	320924	SEY
Yancheng city 盐城市; Yánchéng Shì (3209 / YCK)	Jianhu County	建湖县	Jiànhú Xiàn	320925	JIH
Yancheng city 盐城市; Yánchéng Shì (3209 / YCK)	Dongtai city	东台市	Dōngtái Shì	320981	DTS
Yangzhou city 扬州市; Yángzhōu Shì (3210 / YZH)	Guangling District	广陵区	Guǎnglíng Qū	321002	GGL
Yangzhou city 扬州市; Yángzhōu Shì (3210 / YZH)	Hanjiang District	邗江区	Hánjiāng Qū	321003	HAJ
Yangzhou city 扬州市; Yángzhōu Shì (3210 / YZH)	Jiangdu District	江都区	Jiāngdū Qū	321012	JDJ
Yangzhou city 扬州市; Yángzhōu Shì (3210 / YZH)	Baoying County	宝应县	Bǎoyìng Xiàn	321023	BYI
Yangzhou city 扬州市; Yángzhōu Shì (3210 / YZH)	Yizheng city	仪征市	Yízhēng Shì	321081	YZE
Yangzhou city 扬州市; Yángzhōu Shì (3210 / YZH)	Gaoyou city	高邮市	Gāoyóu Shì	321084	GYO
Zhenjiang city 镇江市; Zhènjiāng Shì (3211 / ZHE)	Jingkou District	京口区	Jīngkǒu Qū	321102	JKQ
Zhenjiang city 镇江市; Zhènjiāng Shì (3211 / ZHE)	Runzhou District	润州区	Rùnzhōu Qū	321111	RZQ
Zhenjiang city 镇江市; Zhènjiāng Shì (3211 / ZHE)	Dantu District	丹徒区	Dāntú Qū	321112	DNT
Zhenjiang city 镇江市; Zhènjiāng Shì (3211 / ZHE)	Danyang city	丹阳市	Dānyáng Shì	321181	DNY
Zhenjiang city 镇江市; Zhènjiāng Shì (3211 / ZHE)	Yangzhong city	扬中市	Yángzhōng Shì	321182	YZG
Zhenjiang city 镇江市; Zhènjiāng Shì (3211 / ZHE)	Jurong city	句容市	Jùróng Shì	321183	JRG
Taizhou city 泰州市; Tàizhōu Shì (3212 / TZS)	Hailing District	海陵区	Hǎilíng Qū	321202	HIL
Taizhou city 泰州市; Tàizhōu Shì (3212 / TZS)	Gaogang District	高港区	Gāogǎng Qū	321203	GGQ
Taizhou city 泰州市; Tàizhōu Shì (3212 / TZS)	Jiangyan District	姜堰区	Jiāngyàn Qū	321204	JYR
Taizhou city 泰州市; Tàizhōu Shì (3212 / TZS)	Jingjiang city	靖江市	Jìngjiāng Shì	321282	XHS
Taizhou city 泰州市; Tàizhōu Shì (3212 / TZS)	Taixing city	泰兴市	Tàixīng Shì	321283	JGJ
Taizhou city 泰州市; Tàizhōu Shì (3212 / TZS)	Xinghua city	兴化市	Xīnghuà Shì	321281	TXG
Suqian city 宿迁市; Sùqiān Shì (3213 / SUQ)	Sucheng District	宿城区	Sùchéng Qū	321302	SCE
Suqian city 宿迁市; Sùqiān Shì (3213 / SUQ)	Suyu District	宿豫区	Sùyù Qū	321311	SYY
Suqian city 宿迁市; Sùqiān Shì (3213 / SUQ)	Shuyang County	沭阳县	Shùyáng Xiàn	321322	SYD
Suqian city 宿迁市; Sùqiān Shì (3213 / SUQ)	Siyang County	泗阳县	Sìyáng Xiàn	321323	SIY
Suqian city 宿迁市; Sùqiān Shì (3213 / SUQ)	Sihong County	泗洪县	Sìhóng Xiàn	321324	SIH

== Recent changes in administrative divisions ==
Date	Before	After	Note	Reference
1970-01-28	Lianyungang District Office	Lianyun District	reorganized	
1970-01-28	Yan District Office	Yan District	reorganized	
1970-01-28	parts of Qixia District	Zhongshan Special District	established	
1970-01-28	parts of Yaowu District	Zhongshan Special District	established	
1971-02-22	Luhe Prefecture	Nanjing (P-City)	merged into	
1971-02-22	Luhe Prefecture	Huaiyin Prefecture	transferred	
1971-02-22	↳ Xuyi County	↳ Xuyi County	transferred	
1971-02-22	↳ Jinhu County	↳ Jinhu County	transferred	
1971-02-22	parts of Luhe Prefecture	Yangzhou Prefecture	transferred	
1971-02-22	↳ Luhe County	↳ Luhe County	transferred	
1971-02-22	↳ Yizheng County	↳ Yizheng County	transferred	
1971-02-22	parts of Zhenjiang Prefecture	Nanjing (P-City)	transferred	
1971-02-22	↳ Jiangning County	↳ Jiangning County	transferred	
1973-09-01	parts of Jiangpu County	Dachang District	established	
1973-11-01	Yaowu District	Xuanwu District	renamed	
1973-11-01	Chaoyang District	Baixia District	renamed	
1973-11-01	Zunyi District	Qinhuai District	renamed	
1973-11-01	Hongwei District, Nanjing	Jianye District	renamed	
1973-11-01	Yan'an District, Nanjing	Gulou District, Nanjing	renamed	
1973-11-01	Dongfang District	Xiaguan District	renamed	
1973-10-19	parts of Wujin County	Jiao District, Changzhou	established	
1975-11-08	parts of Yangzhou Prefecture	Nanjing (P-City)	transferred	
1975-11-08	↳ Luhe County	↳ Luhe County	transferred	
1975-05-03	Hongwei District, Xuzhou	Yunlong District	renamed	
1975-10-05	Dachang District	Pukou District	merged into	
1975-10-05	Zhongshan Special District	Qixia District	merged into	
1978-07-31	Jiao District Office	Tongshan County	merged into	
1978-08-25	Chongwu District	Chong'an District	renamed	
1979-03-19	Yan'an District, Xuzhou	Gulou District, Xuzhou	renamed	
1979-03-19	Nantong (P-City) city district	Chengzhong District	established	
1979-03-19	Nantong (P-City) city district	Gangzha District	established	
1979-03-19	Nantong (P-City) city district	Jiao District, Nantong	established	
1980-04-26	parts of Luhe County	Dachang District	established	
1980-06-09	Dongfeng District, Changzhou	Tianning District	renamed	
1980-06-09	Xiangyang District	Guanghua District	renamed	
1980-06-09	Shengli District	Zhonglou District	renamed	
1980-06-09	Weidong District	Qishuyan District	renamed	
1980-06-09	Dongfeng District, Suzhou	Pingjiang District	renamed	
1980-06-09	Hongqi District	Changlang District	renamed	
1980-06-09	Yan'an District	Jinchang District	renamed	
1981-09-07	parts of Guanyun County	Jiao District, Lianyungang	established	
1983-01-18	all Province-controlled city (P-City) → Prefecture-level city (PL-City)			Civil Affairs Announcement
1983-01-18	all Prefecture-controlled city (PC-City) → County-level city (CL-City)			Civil Affairs Announcement
1983-01-18	Huaiyin Prefecture	Huaiyin (PL-City) city district	reorganized	
1983-01-18	↳ Qingjiang (CL-City)	Huaiyin (PL-City) city district	disestablished	
1983-01-18	↳ Huaiyin County	Huaiyin (PL-City) city district	disestablished	
1983-01-18	Yancheng Prefecture	Yancheng (PL-City) city district	reorganized	
1983-01-18	↳ Yancheng County	Yancheng (PL-City) city district	disestablished	
1983-01-18	Yangzhou Prefecture	Yangzhou (PL-City) city district	reorganized	
1983-01-18	↳ Yangzhou (CL-City)	Yangzhou (PL-City) city district	disestablished	
1983-01-18	Zhenjiang Prefecture	Zhenjiang (PL-City) city district	reorganized	
1983-01-18	↳ Zhenjiang (CL-City)	Zhenjiang (PL-City) city district	disestablished	
1983-01-18	parts of Zhenjiang Prefecture	Nanjing (PL-City)	transferred	
1983-01-18	↳ Lishui County	↳ Lishui County	transferred	
1983-01-18	↳ Gaochun County	↳ Gaochun County	transferred	
1983-01-18	parts of Zhenjiang Prefecture	Changzhou (PL-City)	transferred	
1983-01-18	↳ Wujin County	↳ Wujin County	transferred	
1983-01-18	↳ Jintan County	↳ Jintan County	transferred	
1983-01-18	↳ Liyang County	↳ Liyang County	transferred	
1983-01-18	parts of Zhenjiang Prefecture	Wuxi (PL-City)	transferred	
1983-01-18	↳ Yixing County	↳ Yixing County	transferred	
1983-01-18	Xuzhou Prefecture	Xuzhou (PL-City)	merged into	
1983-01-18	Xuzhou Prefecture	Lianyungang (PL-City)	transferred	
1983-01-18	↳ Donghai County	↳ Donghai County	transferred	
1983-01-18	↳ Ganyu County	↳ Ganyu County	transferred	
1983-01-18	Suzhou Prefecture	Suzhou (PL-City)	merged into	
1983-01-18	Suzhou Prefecture	Wuxi (PL-City)	transferred	
1983-01-18	↳ Jiangyin County	↳ Jiangyin County	transferred	
1983-01-18	↳ Wuxi County	↳ Wuxi County	transferred	
1983-01-18	Nantong Prefecture	Nantong (PL-City)	merged into	
1983-02-12	Yancheng (PL-City) city district	Cheng District, Yancheng	established	
1983-02-12	Yancheng (PL-City) city district	Jiao District, Yancheng	established	
1983-02-16	Chengzhong District	Cheng District, Nantong	disestablished & established	
1983-02-16	Gangzha District	Cheng District, Nantong	disestablished & established	
1983-02-12	Huaiyin (PL-City) city district	Qingjiang District	established	
1983-02-12	Huaiyin (PL-City) city district	Qingpu District	established	
1983-02-26	Yangzhou (PL-City) city district	Guangling District	established	
1983-03-29	parts of Tongshan County	Jiao District, Xuzhou	established	
1983-06-14	Xinpu District	Xinhai District	disestablished & established	
1983-06-14	Haizhou District	Xinhai District	disestablished & established	
1983-06-14	Yan District	Lianyun District	disestablished & established	
1983-06-14	Jiao District, Lianyungang	Lianyun District	disestablished & established	
1983-08-17	Zhenjiang (PL-City) city district	Cheng District, Zhenjiang	established	
1983-08-17	Zhenjiang (PL-City) city district	Jiao District, Zhenjiang	established	
1983-11-24	parts of Wu County	Jiao District, Suzhou	established	
1984-10-13	Cheng District, Zhenjiang	Jingkou District	renamed	
1984-10-13	Jiao District, Zhenjiang	Runzhou District	renamed	
1984-10-13	parts of Hanjiang County	Jiao District, Yangzhou	established	
1986-04-07	parts of Xinhai District	Haizhou District	merged into	
1986-04-21	Yizheng County	Yizheng (CL-City)	reorganized	
1986-04-27	Guanghua District	Zhonglou District	merged into	
1986-04-27	Guanghua District	Tianning District	merged into	
1986-09-16	Shazhou County	Zhangjiagang (CL-City)	reorganized	
1987-04-23	Jiangyin County	Jiangyin (CL-City)	reorganized	
1987-12-15	Suqian County	Suqian (CL-City)	reorganized	
1987-12-15	Danyang County	Danyang (CL-City)	reorganized	
1987-12-17	Dongtai County	Dongtai (CL-City)	reorganized	
1987-12-22	Xinghua County	Xinghua (CL-City)	reorganized	
1987-12-22	Huai'an County	Huai'an (CL-City)	reorganized	
1987-12-22	parts of Wuxi County	Mashan District	reorganized	
1988-01-09	Yixing County	Yixing (CL-City)	reorganized	
1989-07-27	Kunshan County	Kunshan (CL-City)	reorganized	
1989-11-13	Qidong County	Qidong (CL-City)	reorganized	
1990-02-05	Xinyi County	Xinyi (CL-City)	reorganized	
1990-08-15	Liyang County	Liyang (CL-City)	reorganized	
1991-02-06	Rugao County	Rugao (CL-City)	reorganized	Civil Affairs [1991]5
1991-02-06	Gaoyou County	Gaoyou (CL-City)	reorganized	Civil Affairs [1991]6
1991-05-06	Cheng District, Nantong	Chongchuan District	renamed	Civil Affairs [1991]9
1991-05-06	Jiao District, Nantong	Gangzha District	renamed	Civil Affairs [1991]9
1992-02-17	Wujiang County	Wujiang (CL-City)	reorganized	Civil Affairs [1992]18
1992-07-07	Pi County	Pizhou (CL-City)	reorganized	Civil Affairs [1992]70
1992-09-21	Taixing County	Taixing (CL-City)	reorganized	
1993-01-08	Taicang County	Taicang (CL-City)	reorganized	Civil Affairs [1993]3
1993-01-08	Nantong County	Tongzhou (CL-City)	reorganized	Civil Affairs [1993]4
1993-07-14	Jingjiang County	Jingjiang (CL-City)	reorganized	
1993-09-02	Jiao District, Xuzhou	Quanshan District	renamed	Civil Affairs [1993]173
1993-11-10	Jintan County	Jintan (CL-City)	reorganized	Civil Affairs [1993]212
1994-04-26	Jiangdu County	Jiangdu (CL-City)	reorganized	Civil Affairs [1994]62
1994-04-26	Haimen County	Haimen (CL-City)	reorganized	Civil Affairs [1994]63
1994-05-18	Yangzhong County	Yangzhong (CL-City)	reorganized	Civil Affairs [1994]81
1994-07-17	Tai County	Jiangyan (CL-City)	reorganized	Civil Affairs [1994]114
1995-04-06	Jurong County	Jurong (CL-City)	reorganized	Civil Affairs [1995]26
1995-06-08	Wu County	Wuxian (CL-City)	reorganized	Civil Affairs [1995]40
1995-06-08	Wujin County	Wujin (CL-City)	reorganized	Civil Affairs [1995]41
1995-06-08	Wuxi County	Xishan (CL-City)	reorganized	Civil Affairs [1995]42
1995-12-26	Kuang District, Xuzhou	Jiuli District	reorganized	Civil Affairs [1995]85
1996-07-19	Jiao District, Yancheng	Yandu County	disestablished & merged into	State Council [1996]56
1996-07-19	Jiao District, Yancheng	Cheng District, Yancheng	disestablished & merged into	State Council [1996]56
1996-07-19	parts of Yangzhou (PL-City)	Taizhou (PL-City)	established	State Council [1996]57
1996-07-19	↳ Taizhou (CL-City)	↳ Hailing District	transferred & reorganized	State Council [1996]57
1996-07-19	↳ Jiangyan (CL-City)	↳ Jiangyan (CL-City)	transferred	State Council [1996]57
1996-07-19	↳ Jingjiang (CL-City)	↳ Jingjiang (CL-City)	transferred	State Council [1996]57
1996-07-19	↳ Taixing (CL-City)	↳ Taixing (CL-City)	transferred	State Council [1996]57
1996-07-19	↳ Xinghua (CL-City)	↳ Xinghua (CL-City)	transferred	State Council [1996]57
1996-07-19	parts of Huai'an (PL-City)	Suqian (PL-City)	established	State Council [1996]58
1996-07-19	↳ Suqian (CL-City)	↳ Sucheng District	transferred & reorganized	State Council [1996]58
1996-07-19	↳ Suyu County	↳ Suyu County	transferred	State Council [1996]58
1996-07-19	↳ Shuyang County	↳ Shuyang County	transferred	State Council [1996]58
1996-07-19	↳ Siyang County	↳ Siyang County	transferred	State Council [1996]58
1996-07-19	↳ Sihong County	↳ Sihong County	transferred	State Council [1996]58
1996-08-01	Dafeng County	Dafeng (CL-City)	reorganized	Civil Affairs [1996]52
1997-08-20	parts of Hailing District	Gaogang District	established	State Council [1997]77
2000-01-05	Jiao District, Suzhou	Huqiu District	renamed	
2000-12-21	Jiangning County	Jiangning District	reorganized	
2000-12-21	Hanjiang County	Hanjiang District	reorganized	
2000-12-21	Huaiyin (PL-City)	Huai'an (PL-City)	renamed	
2000-12-21	Huai'an (CL-City)	Chuzhou District	renamed	
2000-12-21	Huaiyin County	Huaiyin District	reorganized	
2000-12-21	Xishan (CL-City)	Xishan District	reorganized	
2000-12-21	Xishan (CL-City)	Huishan District	established	
2000-12-21	Mashan District	Binhu District	disestablished & established	
2000-12-21	Jiao District, Wuxi	Binhu District	disestablished & established	
2000-12-31	Wuxian (CL-City)	Wuzhong District	reorganized	
2000-12-31	Wuxian (CL-City)	Xiangcheng District	established	
2001-10-01	parts of Yuntai District	Lianyun District	merged into	State Council [2001]129
2001-10-01	parts of Yuntai District	Xinpu District	merged into	State Council [2001]129
2002-04-03	Wujin (CL-City)	Wujin District	reorganized	State Council [2002]22
2002-04-03	Jiao District, Changzhou	Xinbei District	renamed	State Council [2002]22
2002-04-03	Jiangpu County	Pukou District	merged into	State Council [2002]23
2002-04-03	Luhe County	Luhe District	reorganized	State Council [2002]23
2002-04-03	Dachang District	Luhe District	merged into	State Council [2002]23
2002-04-03	Dantu County	Dantu District	reorganized	State Council [2002]24
2002-11-12	Jiao District, Yangzhou	Weiyang District	renamed	Civil Affairs [2002]182
2003-12-18	Yandu County	Yandu District	renamed	State Council [2003]130
2003-12-18	Cheng District, Yancheng	Tinghu District	renamed	State Council [2003]130
2004-01-15	Suyu County	Suyu District	reorganized	State Council [2004]6
2009-03-23	Tongzhou (CL-City)	Tongzhou District	reorganized	State Council [2009]34
2010-09-05	parts of Jiuli District	Gulou District, Xuzhou	merged into	State Council [2010]90
2010-09-05	parts of Jiuli District	Quanshan District	merged into	State Council [2010]90
2010-09-05	parts of Jiuli District	Tongshan District	merged into	State Council [2010]90
2010-09-05	Tongshan County	Tongshan District	reorganized	State Council [2010]90
2011-10-22	Jiangdu (CL-City)	Jiangdu District	reorganized	State Council [2011]132
2011-10-22	Weiyang District	Hanjiang District	reorganized	State Council [2011]132
2011-12-30	Chuzhou District	Huai'an District	renamed	Civil Affairs [2011]357
2012-08-17	Canglang District	Gusu District	merged & established	State Council [2012]102
2012-08-17	Pingjiang District	Gusu District	merged & established	State Council [2012]102
2012-08-17	Jinchang District	Gusu District	merged & established	State Council [2012]102
2012-08-17	Wujiang (CL-City)	Wujiang District	reorganized	State Council [2012]102
2012-12-17	Jiangyan (CL-City)	Jiangyan District	reorganized	State Council [2012]208
2013-02-08	Baixia District	Qinhuai District	merged into	State Council [2013]24
2013-02-08	Xiaguan District	Gulou District, Nanjing	merged into	State Council [2013]24
2013-02-08	Lishui County	Lishui District	reorganized	State Council [2013]24
2013-02-08	Gaochun County	Gaochun District	reorganized	State Council [2013]24
2014-05-02	Xinpu District	Haizhou District	merged into	State Council [2014]56
2014-05-02	Ganyu County	Ganyu District	reorganized	State Council [2014]56
2015-04-29	Qishuyan District	Wujin District	merged into	State Council [2015]75
2015-04-29	Jintan (CL-City)	Jintan District	reorganized	State Council [2015]75
2015-07-23	Dafeng (CL-City)	Dafeng District	reorganized	State Council [2015]120
2015-10-13	Chong'an District	Liangxi District	merged & established	State Council [2015]184
2015-10-13	Nanchang District	Liangxi District	merged & established	State Council [2015]184
2015-10-13	Beitang District	Liangxi District	merged & established	State Council [2015]184
2015-10-13	parts of Binhu District	Xinwu District	established	State Council [2015]184
2016-06-08	Qinghe District	Qingjiangpu District	merged & established	State Council [2016]100
2016-06-08	Qingpu District	Qingjiangpu District	merged & established	State Council [2016]100
2016-06-08	Hongze County	Hongze District	reorganized	State Council [2016]100
2018-02-22	Hai'an County	Hai'an (CL-City)	reorganized	Civil Affairs [2018]49
2020-07-??	Gangzha District	Chongchuan District	merged into	
2020-07-??	Haimen (CL-City)	Haimen District	reorganized	

== Population composition ==
=== Prefectures ===
Prefecture	2010	2000
Nanjing	8,004,680	6,238,486
Changzhou	4,591,972	3,845,507
Huai'an	4,799,889	5,130,605
Lianyungang	4,393,914	4,653,701
Nantong	7,282,835	
Suqian	4,715,553	5,154,397
Suzhou	11,769,113	10,465,994
Taizhou	4,618,558	
Wuxi	6,372,624	5,179,847
Xuzhou	8,580,500	9,077,400
Yancheng	7,260,240	8,092,241
Yangzhou	4,459,760	4,672,684
Zhenjiang	3,113,384	2,897,016

=== Counties ===
Name	Prefecture	2010
Xuanwu	Nanjing	651,957
Qinhuai	Nanjing	1,007,922
Jianye	Nanjing	426,999
Gulou	Nanjing	1,271,191
Pukou	Nanjing	710,298
Qixia	Nanjing	644,503
Yuhuatai	Nanjing	391,285
Jiangning	Nanjing	1,145,628
Luhe	Nanjing	915,845
Lishui	Nanjing	421,323
Gaochun	Nanjing	417,729
Liangxi	Wuxi	(not established)
Xinwu	Wuxi	536,807
Binhu	Wuxi	688,965
Huishan	Wuxi	691,059
Xishan	Wuxi	681,300
Jiangyin	Wuxi	1,594,829
Yixing	Wuxi	1,235,476
Gulou	Xuzhou	490,855
Yunlong	Xuzhou	345,393
Jiawang	Xuzhou	430,712
Quanshan	Xuzhou	539,693
Tongshan	Xuzhou	1,247,125
Feng(xian)	Xuzhou	963,531
Pei(xian)	Xuzhou	1,141,935
Suining	Xuzhou	1,039,315
Xinyi	Xuzhou	920,628
Pizhou	Xuzhou	1,458,038
Tianning	Changzhou	513,682
Zhonglou	Changzhou	505,936
Qishuyan	Changzhou	105,124
Xinbei	Changzhou	596,807
Wujin	Changzhou	1,568,999
Liyang	Changzhou	749,377
Jintan	Changzhou	552,047
Gusu	Suzhou	954,455
Huqiu	Suzhou	572,313
Wuzhong	Suzhou	1,853,656
Xiangcheng	Suzhou	693,576
Wujiang	Suzhou	1,275,090
Changshu	Suzhou	1,510,103
Zhangjiagang	Suzhou	1,248,414
Kunshan	Suzhou	1,646,318
Taicang	Suzhou	712,069
Chongchuan	Nantong	868,262
Tongzhou	Nantong	1,138,738
Hai'an	Nantong	866,337
Rudong	Nantong	995,983
Qidong	Nantong	972,525
Rugao	Nantong	1,267,066
Haimen	Nantong	907,598
Lianyun	Lianyungang	231,697
Haizhou	Lianyungang	818,834
Ganyu	Lianyungang	949,438
Donghai	Lianyungang	952,250
Guanyun	Lianyungang	817,629
Guannan	Lianyungang	624,766
Qingjiangpu	Huai'an	(not established)
Chuzhou → Huai'an	Huai'an	984,601
Huaiyin	Huai'an	788,634
Lianshui	Huai'an	859,991
Hongze	Huai'an	326,365
Xuyi	Huai'an	658,830
Jinhu	Huai'an	321,283
Tinghu	Yancheng	904,417
Yandu	Yancheng	711,300
Xiangshui	Yancheng	509,524
Binhai	Yancheng	956,162
Funing	Yancheng	843,275
Sheyang	Yancheng	896,639
Jianhu	Yancheng	741,646
Dongtai	Yancheng	990,208
Dafeng	Yancheng	707,069
Guangling	Yangzhou	340,977
Hanjiang	Yangzhou	1,051,322
Baoying	Yangzhou	752,074
Yizheng	Yangzhou	563,945
Gaoyou	Yangzhou	744,662
Jiangdu	Yangzhou	1,006,780
Jingkou	Zhenjiang	601,671
Runzhou	Zhenjiang	296,453
Dantu	Zhenjiang	302,276
Danyang	Zhenjiang	960,418
Yangzhong	Zhenjiang	334,886
Jurong	Zhenjiang	617,680
Hailing	Taizhou	475,100
Gaogang	Taizhou	250,500
Jiangyan	Taizhou	729,000
Jingjiang	Taizhou	684,600
Taixing	Taizhou	1,074,300
Xinghua	Taizhou	1,253,800
Sucheng	Suqian	796,627
Suyu	Suqian	641,059
Shuyang	Suqian	1,538,054
Siyang	Suqian	830,502
Sihong	Suqian	909,311
Chong'an (disestablished)	Wuxi	228,854
Nanchang (disestablished)	Wuxi	378,490
Beitang (disestablished)	Wuxi	336,844
Qinghe (disestablished)	Huai'an	529,956
Qingpu (disestablished)	Huai'an	330,229
Gangzha (disestablished)	Nantong	266,326
