= Huai'an Modern Tram =

Tram service in Huai'an, China

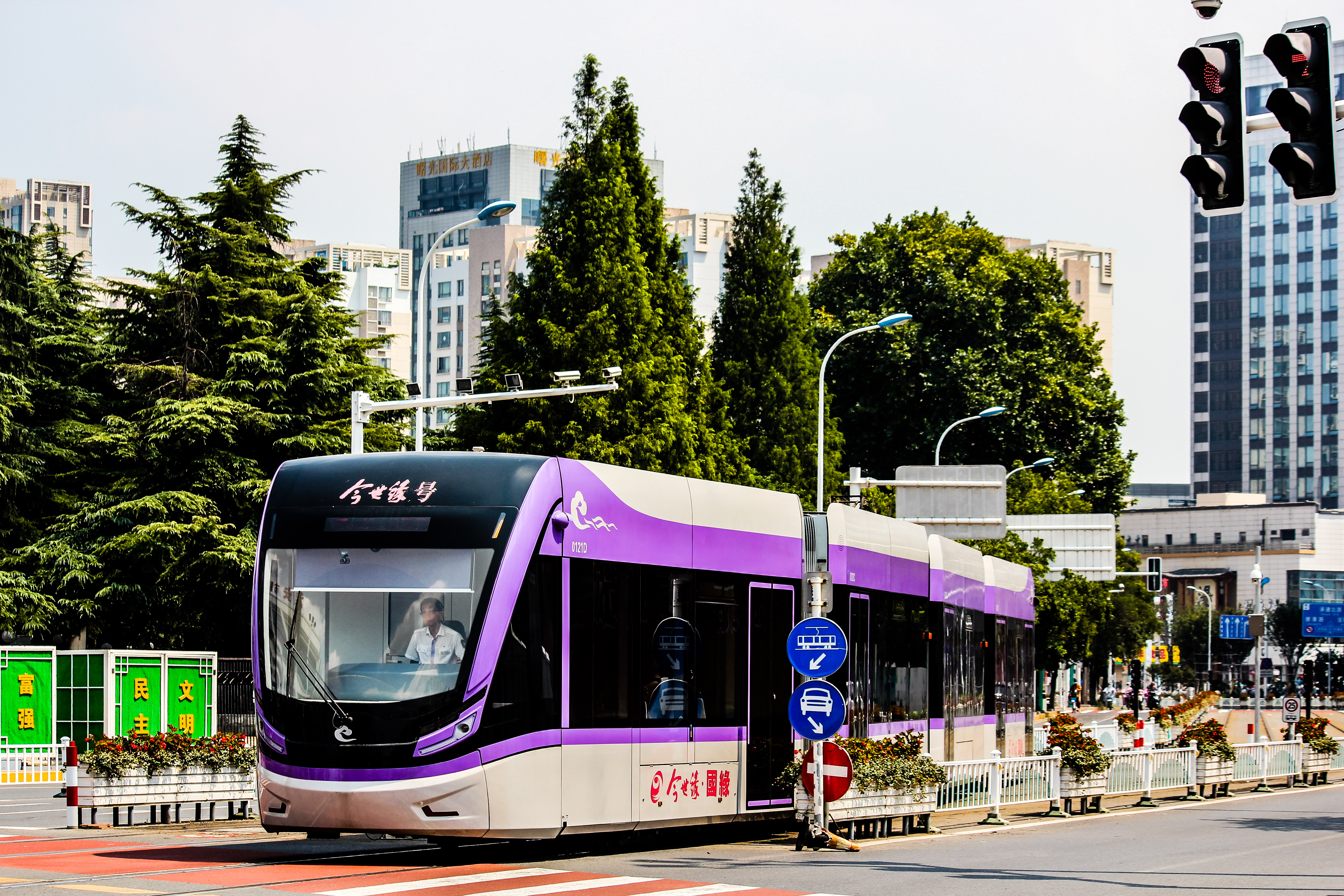

Overview
- Native name: 淮安现代有轨电车
- Locale: Huai'an, China
- Transit type: Tram
- Number of lines: 1
- Number of stations: 23
- Daily ridership: 27,000 (2019 daily avg.) 55,000 (2019 record)
- Website: http://www.hatram.com/

Operation
- Began operation: 28 December 2015; 10 years ago
- Operators: Huai'an Modern Tram Operation Co., Ltd.

Technical
- System length: 20.07 km (12.47 mi)
- Track gauge: Standard gauge 1,435 mm (4 ft 8 1/2 in)

Huai'an Modern Tram is a tram line operating in the city of Huai'an, China, running between Huai’an Gymnasium and South Gate stops. It is an at-grade and catenary-free tram system. It began operations on 28 December 2015.

The tram route is 20.07 kilometres (12.47 mi) long and consists of 23 stops, which connects the city center with the southeastern part of city. 26 CRRC Zhuzhou trams serve the route; each car consists of four sections and is able to accommodate 360 passengers.

== Length and stations ==
=== Stations ===
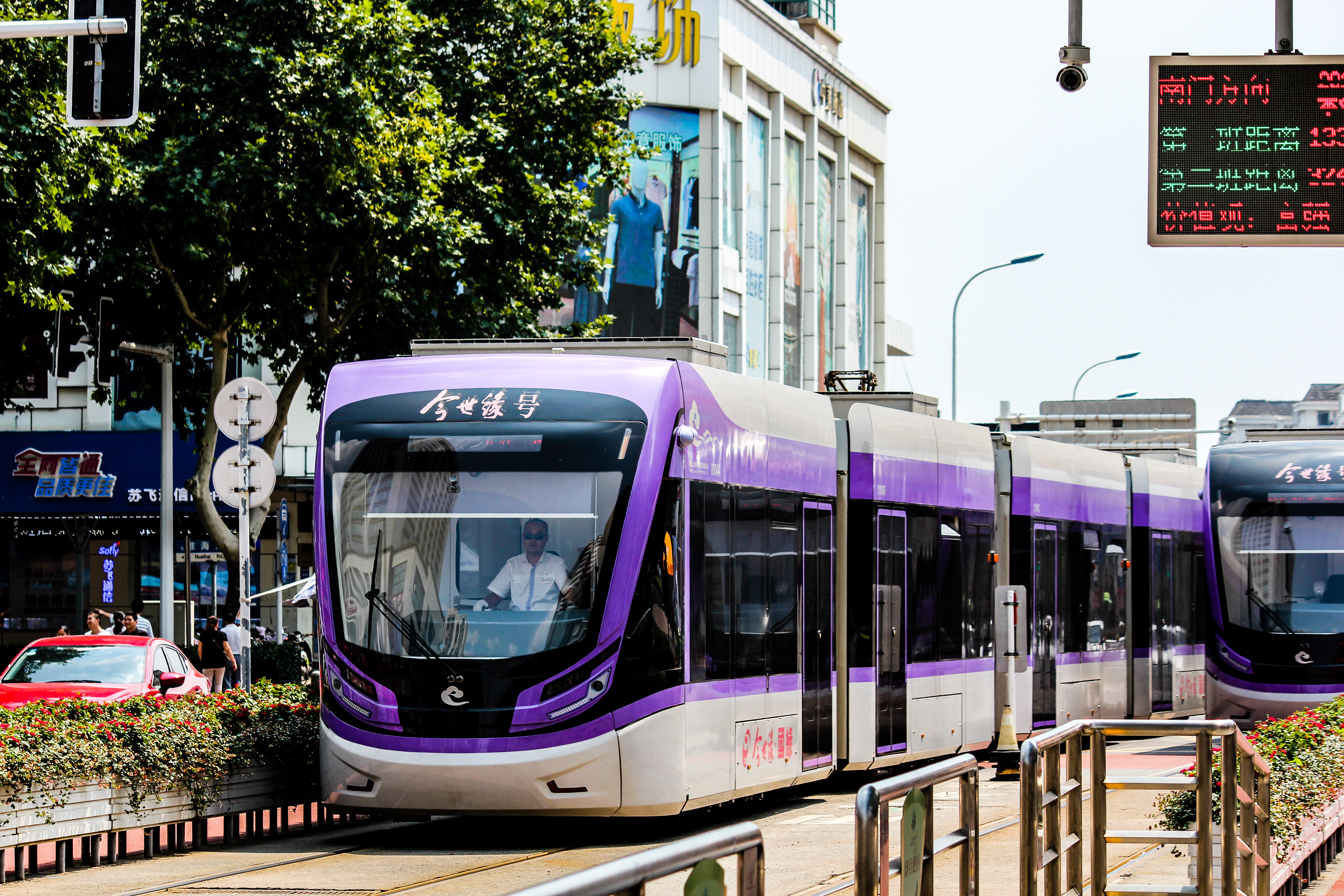
East Huaihai Road Station

Station Name English	Station Name Hanzi	Platform Types	Location
Huai'an Gymnasium	体育馆站	side (at-grade)	Qingjiangpu District
East Huaihai Road	淮海东路站	side (at-grade)	Qingjiangpu District
Grand Canal Square	运河广场站	side (at-grade)	Qingjiangpu District
Laobakou	老坝口站	side (at-grade)	Qingjiangpu District
Shuidukou	水渡口站	side (at-grade)	Qingjiangpu District
Administration Center	政务中心站	island (at-grade)	Qingjiangpu District
Shenzhen Road	深圳路站	island (at-grade)	Qingjiangpu District
Xiamen Road	厦门路站	island (at-grade)	Qingjiangpu District
Bating Bridge	八亭桥站	island (at-grade)	Qingjiangpu District
Shantou Road	汕头路站	island (at-grade)	Qingjiangpu District
Sanya Road	三亚路站	island (at-grade)	Qingjiangpu District
Banzha	板闸站	island (at-grade)	Huai'an District
Grand Theater	大剧院站	island (at-grade)	Huai'an District
Forest Park	森林公园站	island (at-grade)	Huai'an District
Wusha River	乌沙河站	island (at-grade)	Huai'an District
Hexia	河下站	island (at-grade)	Huai'an District
Lizi Dam	礼字坝站	island (at-grade)	Huai'an District
Gumokou	古末口站	island (at-grade)	Huai'an District
Huaxi Road	华西路站	island (at-grade)	Huai'an District
Zhou Enlai Memorial	纪念馆站	island (at-grade)	Huai'an District
Dongyue Temple	东岳庙站	island (at-grade)	Huai'an District
Longguang Pavilion	龙光阁站	island (at-grade)	Huai'an District
South Gate	南门站	island (at-grade)	Huai'an District
