= Jinhu =

Jinhu may refer to:

== Mainland China ==
- Jinhu County (金湖县), of Huai'an, Jiangsu
- Jinhu, Jianhu County (阜余镇), town in Jianhu County, Jiangsu
- Jinhu, Gongqingcheng (金湖镇), town in Gongqingcheng City, Jiangxi

== Taiwan ==
- Jinhu, Kinmen (金湖鎮), urban township in Kinmen (Quemoy), Fujian
