= Huai'an =

Huai'an 淮安市 Hwaian, Huai-an
- Prefecture-level city
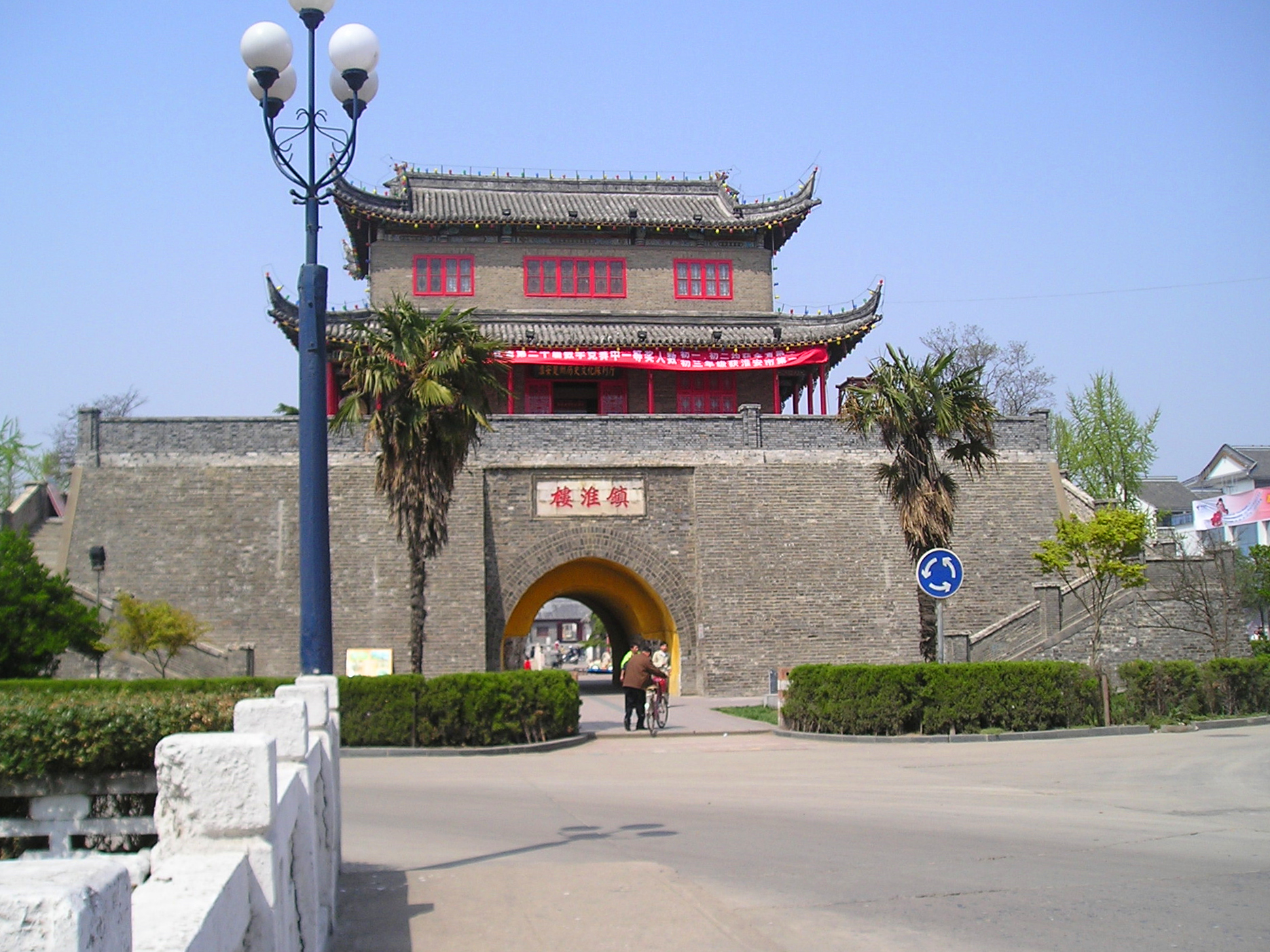
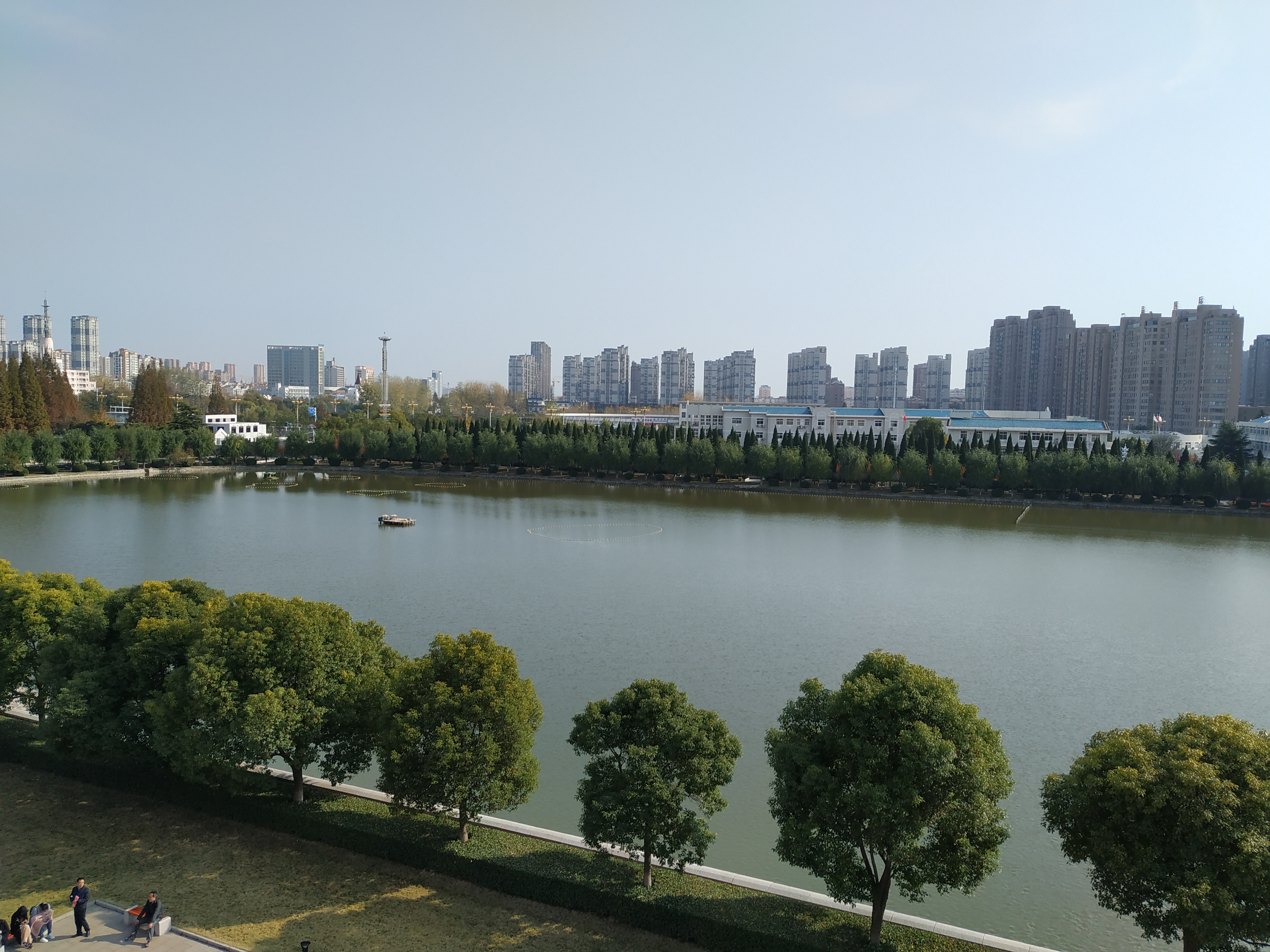
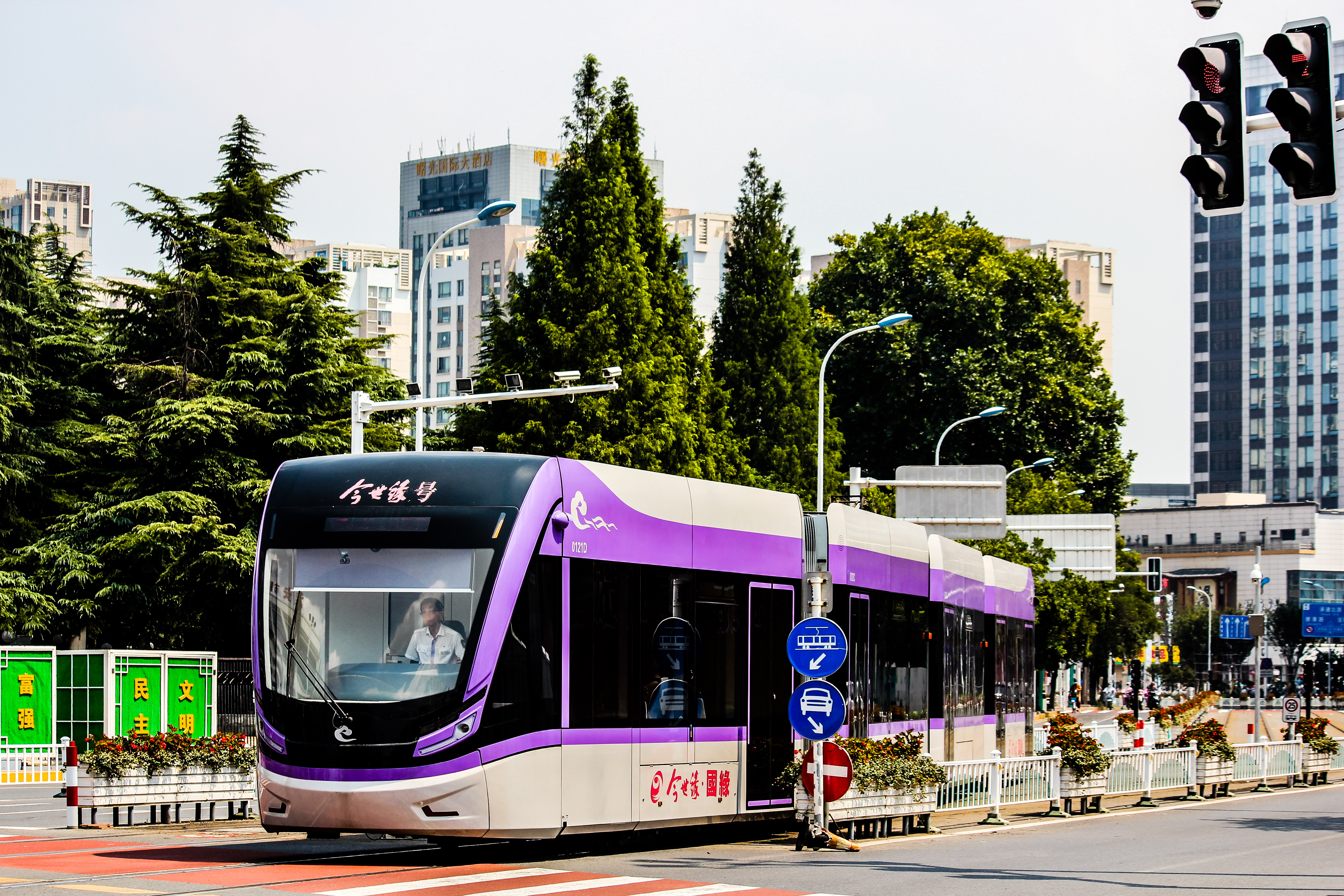
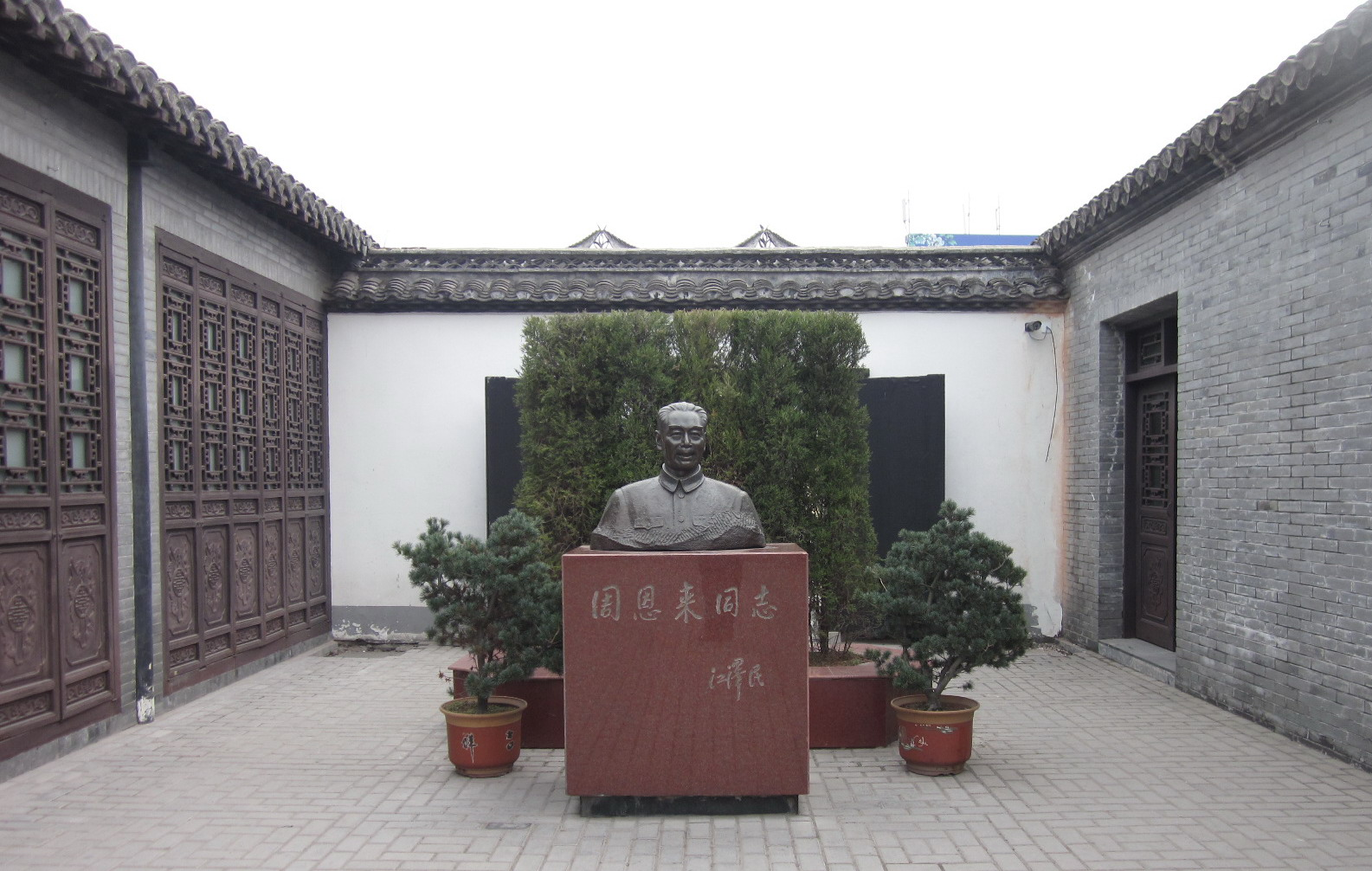
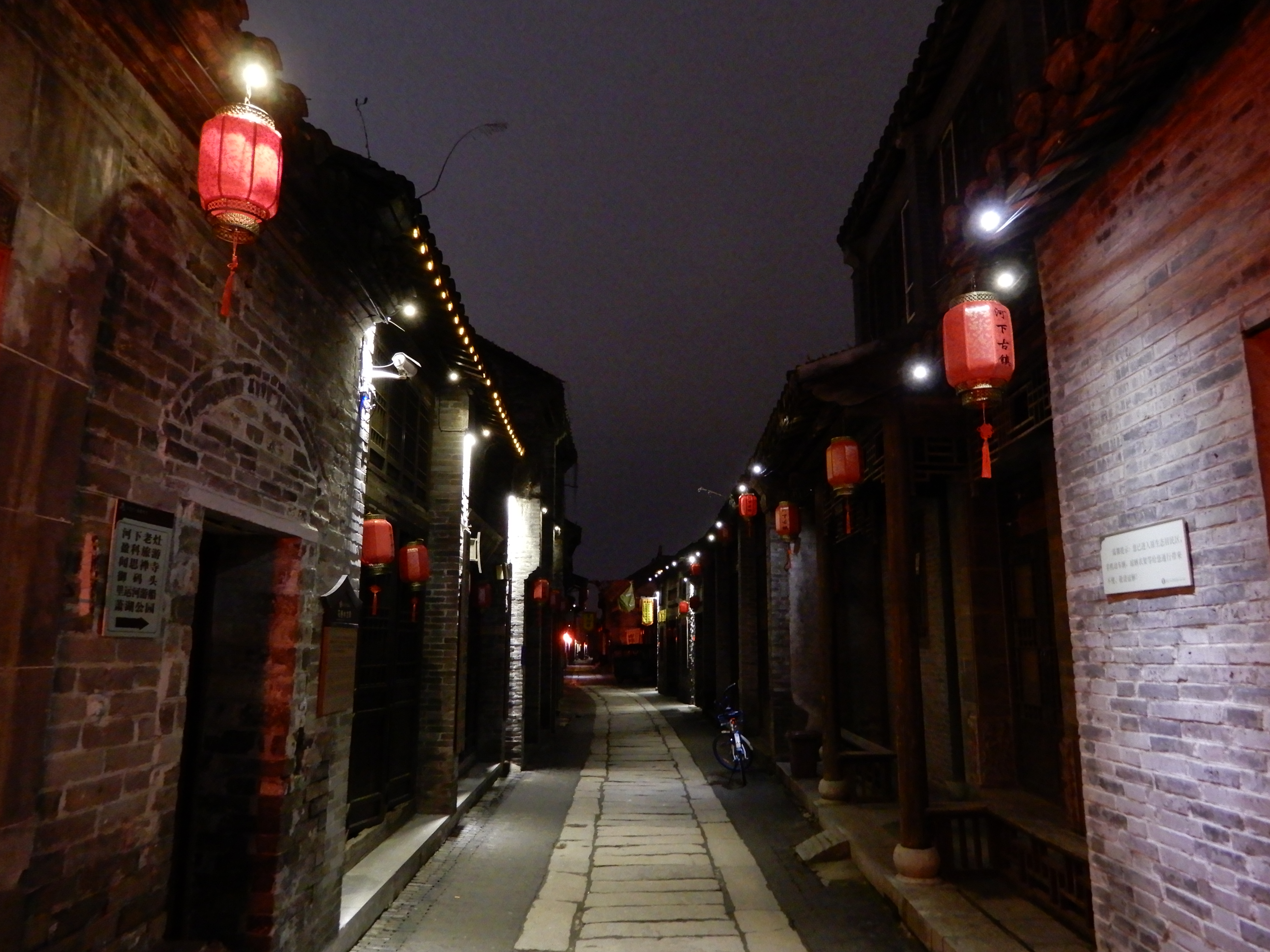
- Left to right, top to bottom: Zhenhuailou Tower above the city gate, the skyline of Huai'an, Huai'an tram line 1, the Zhou Enlai Memorial Hall, night view of Hexia old town.

- Location of Huai'an City (red) in Jiangsu
- Interactive map of Huai'an
- Location of the city center in Jiangsu Huai'an (Eastern China) Huai'an (China)
- Coordinates (Huai'an municipal government): 33°33′04″N 119°06′47″E
- Country: People's Republic of China
- Province: Jiangsu
- Municipal seat: Huai'an District

Government
  - Mayor: Hui Jianlin (惠建林)

Area
  - Prefecture-level city: 9,950 km^{2} (3,840 sq mi)
  - Urban: 4,494.3 km^{2} (1,735.3 sq mi)
  - Metro: 3,202.6 km^{2} (1,236.5 sq mi)

Population (2020 census)
  - Prefecture-level city: 4,556,230
  - Density: 458/km^{2} (1,190/sq mi)
  - Urban: 2,829,864
  - Urban density: 629.66/km^{2} (1,630.8/sq mi)
  - Metro: 2,544,767
  - Metro density: 794.59/km^{2} (2,058.0/sq mi)

GDP
  - Prefecture-level city: CN¥ 360 billion US$ 54.4 billion
  - Per capita: CN¥ 73,204; US$ 11,083
- Time zone: UTC+8 (China Standard)
- Postal code: 223000, 223200, 223300 (Urban center); 211600, 211700, 223100, 223400 (Other areas) (Other areas)
- Area code: 517
- ISO 3166 code: CN-JS-08
- Major Nationalities: Han
- County-level divisions: 8
- Township-level divisions: 127
- License Plate Prefix: 苏H
- Website: www.huaian.gov.cn

Huai'an
- Chinese: 淮安
Transcriptions
Standard Mandarin
- Hanyu Pinyin: Huái'ān
- Wade–Giles: Huai^{2}-an^{1}
- IPA: [xwǎɪ.án]

Huaiyin
- Traditional Chinese: 淮陰
- Simplified Chinese: 淮阴
- Literal meaning: South Bank of the Huai
Transcriptions
Standard Mandarin
- Hanyu Pinyin: Huáiyīn
- Wade–Giles: Huai-yin

Huai'an, formerly Huaiyin, is a prefecture-level city in Jiangsu in Eastern China. As of 2020, the built-up area (metro) of its 3 central urban districts had 2,544,767 inhabitants and the prefecture-level city as a whole had 4,556,230 inhabitants.

Long an important regional center, Huai'an lies on and is named for the Huai River, the historical boundary between northern and southern Chinese culture. Once much closer to the East China Sea, it now lies in the middle of Jianghuai, the vast alluvial plain created by silt from the Huai and the Yellow River, which flowed nearby for centuries prior to the massive floods in the mid-19th century which returned it to its old course north of Shandong. Huai'an is known as the birthplace of Han Xin, a famed general who helped found the Han dynasty and overwhelm Xiang Yu in the Chu-han Contention; Wu Cheng'en, the Ming dynasty author of Journey to the West; and Zhou Enlai, a prominent Communist leader who served as premier of the PRC from 1949 until his death in 1976.

== Names ==
Huai'an is the atonal pinyin romanization of the Mandarin pronunciation of the Chinese name 淮安 (Huái'ān), the name of the River Huai and the Chinese word for "peaceful" or "pacified". The apostrophe is necessary because the second character begins with a vowel and pinyin generally avoids hyphens. The same name was previously romanized as Huai-an in Wade-Giles.

For much of the 20th century, Huai'an was officially known as Huaiyin in pinyin, Huai-yin in Wade–Giles, and Hwaiyin in Postal Map, all romanizing the Chinese name written 淮陰 in traditional characters and 淮阴 in simplified ones, meaning "area on the yin, shady, or south bank of the Huai".

== Geography ==
Huai'an lies on the Huai River in the alluvial Jianghuai Plain. The area is very flat with only a few notable hills in Xuyi County. The highest altitude in the municipality is 200 meters (660 ft). The area is notable for its large number of lakes, rivers, and canals. The Grand Canal connects with the Huai in the city. Hongze Lake, the fourth-largest freshwater lake in China, is southwest of the urban districts. Towards the south, there are also several smaller lakes. Huai'an is situated almost directly south of Lianyungang, southeast of Suqian, northwest of Yancheng, and north of Yangzhou and Nanjing in Jiangsu and northeast of Chuzhou in Anhui.

=== Climate ===
The climate in Huai'an is mild, generally warm and temperate. Winters are much drier than summers. Its Köppen climate classification is Cwa: humid subtropical climate with dry winters.

Climate data for Huai'an, elevation 14 m (46 ft), (1991–2020 normals, extremes 1955–present)
Month	Jan	Feb	Mar	Apr	May	Jun	Jul	Aug	Sep	Oct	Nov	Dec	Year
Record high °C (°F)	20.1 (68.2)	24.5 (76.1)	31.2 (88.2)	32.3 (90.1)	34.5 (94.1)	36.7 (98.1)	36.6 (97.9)	37.0 (98.6)	35.1 (95.2)	31.6 (88.9)	27.4 (81.3)	20.7 (69.3)	37.0 (98.6)
Mean daily maximum °C (°F)	6.1 (43.0)	8.8 (47.8)	14.6 (58.3)	20.5 (68.9)	25.7 (78.3)	29.6 (85.3)	31.0 (87.8)	30.6 (87.1)	26.9 (80.4)	22.0 (71.6)	15.3 (59.5)	8.1 (46.6)	19.9 (67.9)
Daily mean °C (°F)	1.6 (34.9)	4.1 (39.4)	9.2 (48.6)	15.1 (59.2)	20.5 (68.9)	24.7 (76.5)	27.3 (81.1)	26.7 (80.1)	22.1 (71.8)	16.5 (61.7)	10.1 (50.2)	3.4 (38.1)	15.1 (59.2)
Mean daily minimum °C (°F)	−1.9 (28.6)	0.3 (32.5)	4.5 (40.1)	10.0 (50.0)	15.5 (59.9)	20.4 (68.7)	24.3 (75.7)	23.7 (74.7)	18.5 (65.3)	12.2 (54.0)	5.9 (42.6)	−0.2 (31.6)	11.1 (52.0)
Record low °C (°F)	−20.2 (−4.4)	−21.5 (−6.7)	−6.9 (19.6)	−1.7 (28.9)	5.3 (41.5)	10.8 (51.4)	18.0 (64.4)	14.7 (58.5)	8.7 (47.7)	0.0 (32.0)	−5.3 (22.5)	−13.7 (7.3)	−21.5 (−6.7)
Average precipitation mm (inches)	24.4 (0.96)	33.0 (1.30)	34.2 (1.35)	47.0 (1.85)	70.6 (2.78)	131.9 (5.19)	252.1 (9.93)	194.7 (7.67)	90.9 (3.58)	44.7 (1.76)	44.3 (1.74)	24.8 (0.98)	992.6 (39.09)
Average precipitation days (≥ 0.1 mm)	5.5	7.0	6.5	8.3	8.7	8.5	13.9	13.6	8.8	6.3	7.0	5.3	99.4
Average snowy days	3.1	2.8	0.9	0.1	0	0	0	0	0	0	0.4	1.0	8.3
Average relative humidity (%)	69	70	65	67	70	72	82	84	81	75	72	69	73
Mean monthly sunshine hours	139.1	129.4	179.0	193.1	196.9	161.1	154.9	166.9	164.3	164.7	145.1	143.2	1,937.7
Percentage possible sunshine	44	42	48	49	46	37	36	41	45	47	47	47	44
Source: China Meteorological Administration all-time January highall-time extreme low

== Administration ==
The prefecture-level city of Huai'an administers 7 county-level divisions, including 4 urban districts and 3 more rural counties.

These are further divided into 127 township-level divisions, including 84 towns, 33 townships, and 10 subdistricts.

Map
Subdivision	Simplified Chinese	Hanyu Pinyin	Population (2020)	Area (km^{2})	Density (/km^{2})
City Proper
Qingjiangpu District	清江浦区	Qīngjiāngpǔ Qū	1,010,704	438.5	2,305
Suburban
Huai'an District	淮安区	Huáiān Qū	785,272	1,460	537.9
Huaiyin District	淮阴区	Huáiyīn Qū	748,791	1,315	569.4
Hongze District	洪泽区	Hóngzé Qū	285,097	1,338	216.3
Rural
Lianshui County	涟水县	Liánshuǐ Xiàn	829,699	1,679	494.2
Xuyi County	盱眙县	Xūyí Xiàn	607,211	2,506	242.3
Jinhu County	金湖县	Jīnhú Xiàn	289,456	1,338	216.3
Total			4,556,230	9,971	456.9
defunct districts - Qinghe District & Qingpu District

== History ==
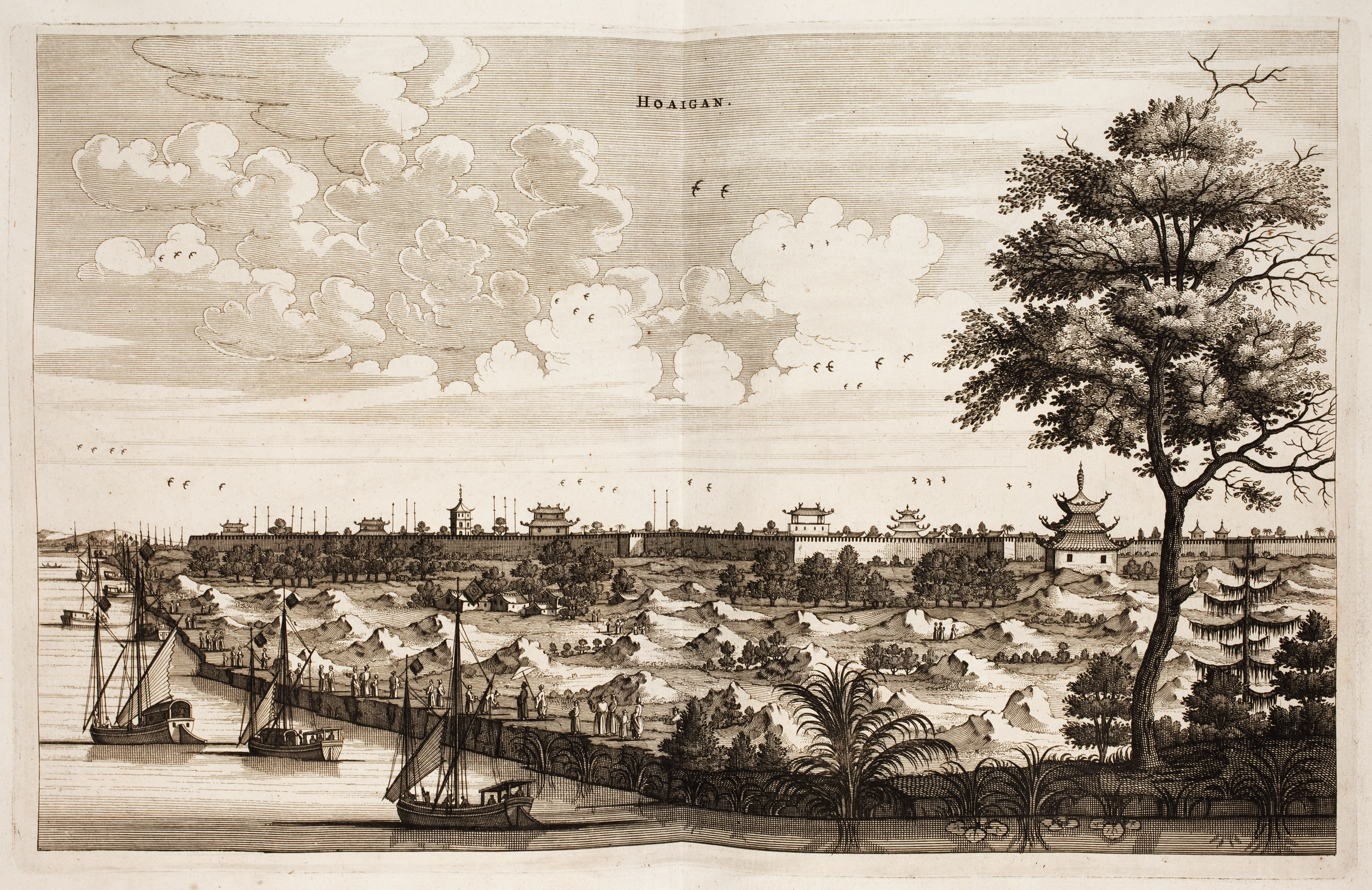
Huai'an ("Hoaigan"), c. 1665

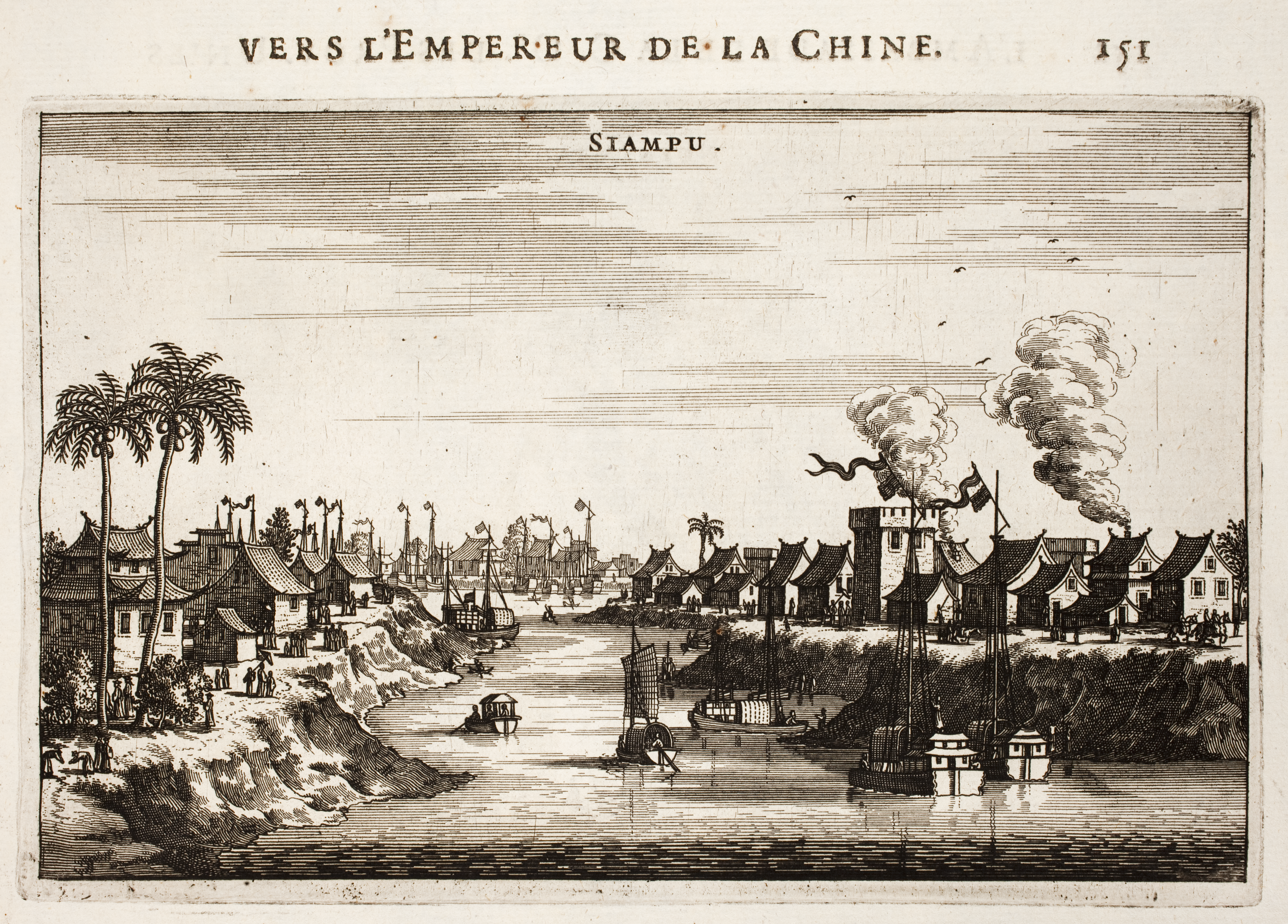
Qingjiangpu ("Siampu"), c. 1665.

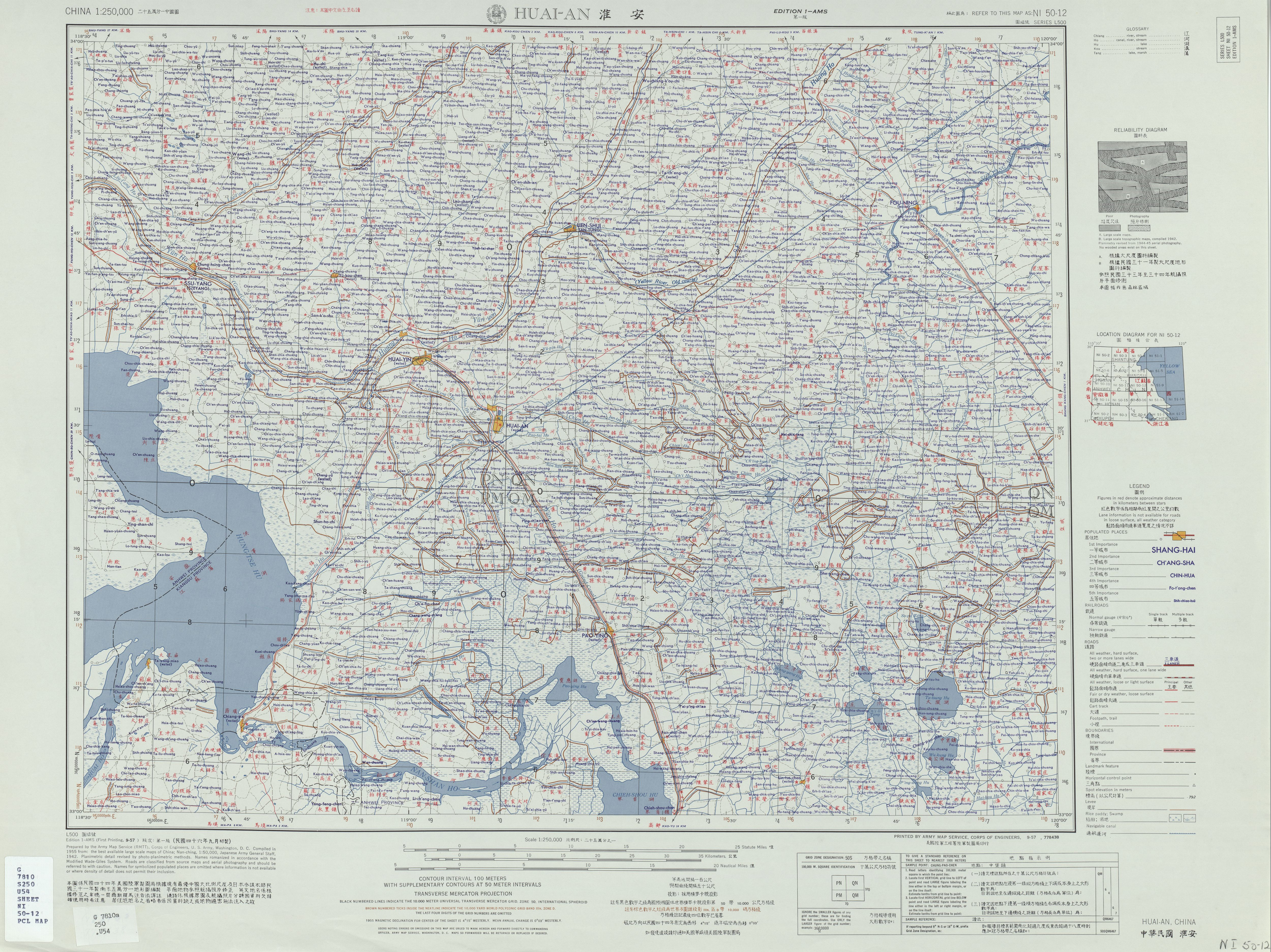
Huai'an ("Huai-an" 淮安") from a 1955 map by the US Army Map Service

=== Prehistoric China ===
Huai'an lies southeast of the cradle of early Chinese civilization on the Wei and Yellow Rivers. Modern Chinese archaeology has found remains from Neolithic civilizations in the area as far back as the 4th millennium BC. The most famous of these is the Qinglianggang culture (青莲岗文化). Traditional Chinese historiography considered the area part of the Dongyi or "Eastern Barbarians", but Chinese myth sometimes extended the flood control efforts of Yu the Great to the Huai.

=== Ancient China ===
Under the Zhou, the area became an important agricultural center contested by the petty kingdoms of the Spring and Autumn period. In 486 BC, the hegemon Fuchai of Wu completed the Han or Hangou Canal (t 邗溝, s 邗沟, Hángōu), connecting his center of power at Suzhou near the Yangtze Delta with the Huai River at Huai'an to ease his supply lines in conflicts against Qi. Increasing in commercial and strategic importance, the town also became a waypoint on the Qian and Shan Roads. During the Warring States period, the area was held in turn by Wu, Yue, and Chu before being conquered by Shi Huangdi of Qin.

=== Imperial China ===
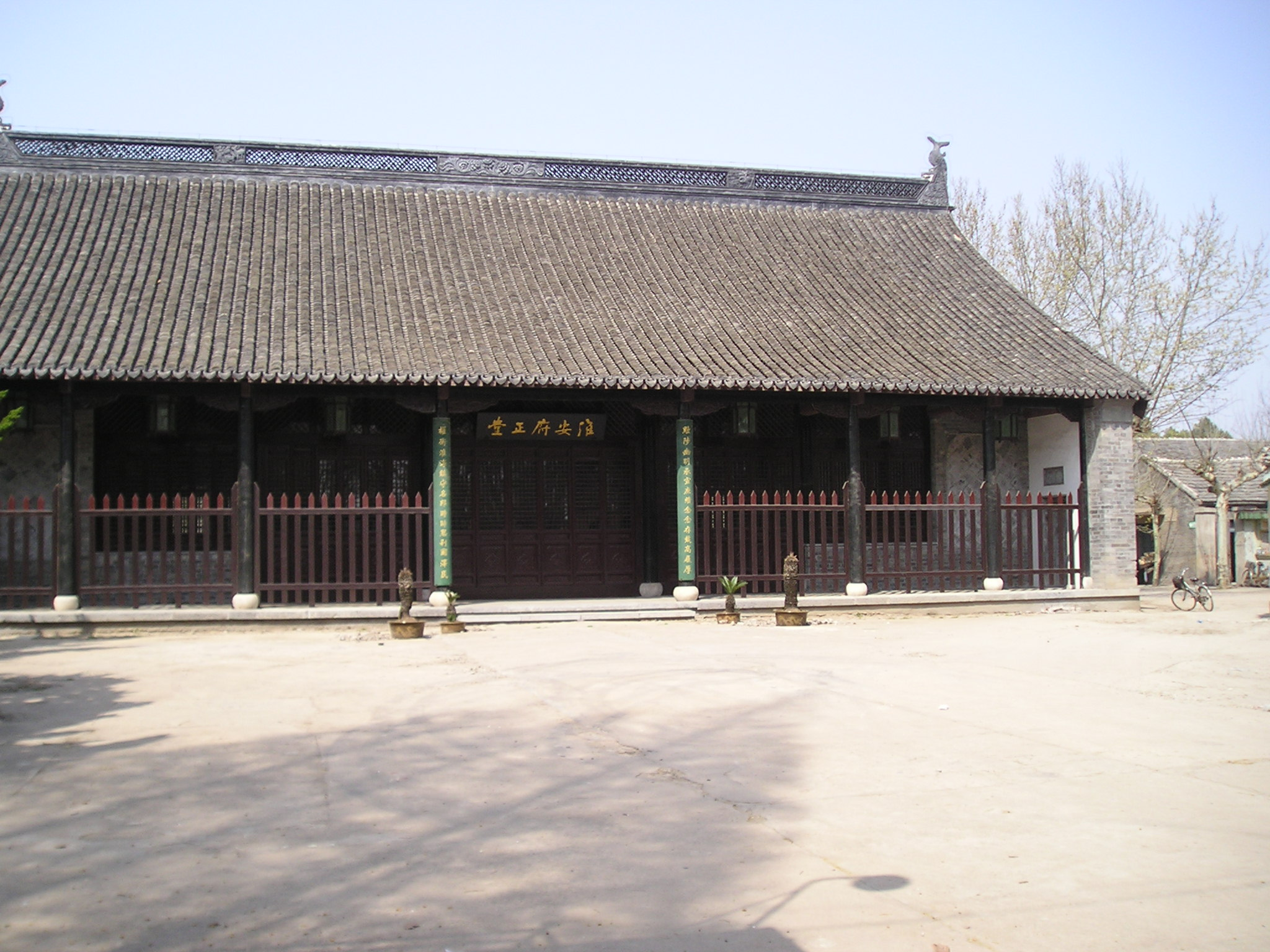
Huai'an Prefecture's central offices in imperial times

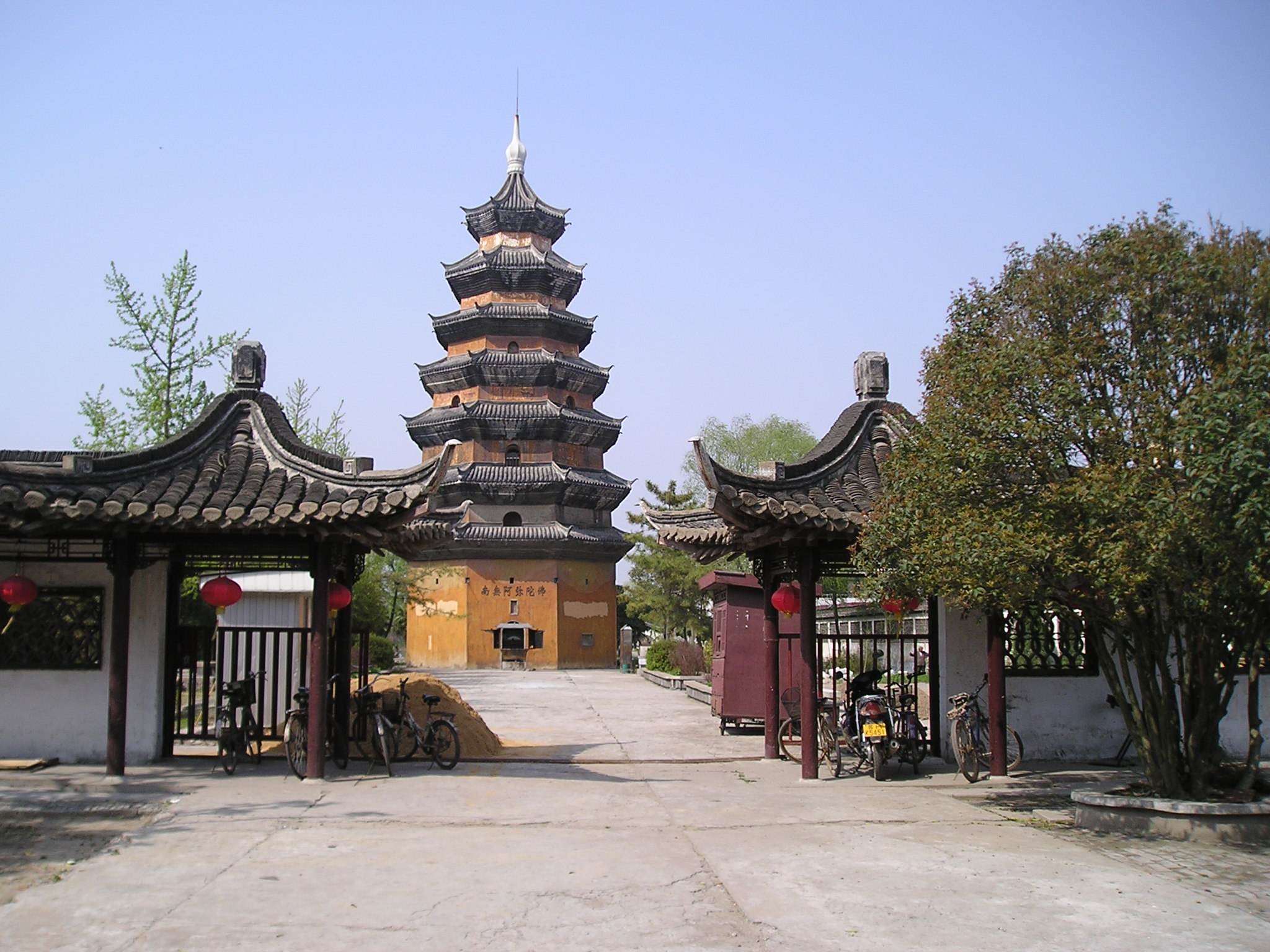
Wentong Pagoda

Under the Qin, the area of present-day Huai'an was administered as the counties or districts of Huaiyin (with its seat at present-day Matou in Huaiyin), Xuyi, and Dongyang (with its seat at present-day Maba in Xuyi). Its people joined the rebels who overthrew the Qin, prominently including Han Xin.

Under the Han, the counties of Huaipu (with its seat in western Lianshui), Sheyang (with its seat in southeastern Huai'an), and Fulin (with its seat now under the waters of Hongze Lake) were added.

In Jian'an 5 (c. 200), near the beginning of the Three Kingdoms period, the Guangling commander Chen Deng—then subordinate to Lü Bu—constructed the first 30-li section of the Gaojia Dike (高家堰, Gāojiāyàn) to minimize damage from flooding along the Huai. He also expanded the Hangou Canal westward and combined the small Fuling lakes into a single Pofu Pond to assist with irrigation.

Under the Sui, the Hangou Canal was expanded north and south to establish the Grand Canal, increasing traffic and trade through the city. Emperor Yang was also responsible for changing Pofu's name to the present-day Hongze Lake out of his delight at rainfall there, encountered after an inspection tour through drought-afflicted areas.

During the Song, Kaifeng's governor Du Chong (杜充, Dù Chōng, d. 1141) breached the levees holding back the Yellow River in 1128 to stop the barbarians advancing. A series of massive floods, manmade and natural, then caused it to capture the Si River and begin flowing into the lower reaches of the Huai. The massive amounts of silt greatly expanded the farmland to the east of Huai'an but also greatly expanded Hongze Lake and caused repeated and disastrous floods despite centuries of attempts at river management by Pan Jixun and similar viceroys, often based within modern Huai'an.

The Ming Dynasty Ancestral Tomb (明祖陵, Míngzǔlíng) is located in Xuyi. Now part of Huai'an, the area around it was administered as the separate Sizhou Prefecture during 1262, when it was the home of the family of the future Hongwu Emperor Zhu Yuanzhang. Although his family moved to Fengyang in present-day Anhui before his birth, he erected a large mausoleum in honor of his grandfather, great-grandfather, and great-great-grandfather after his establishment of the Ming empire. The site's was entirely submerged—along with the entire city of Sizhou—in 1680. It did not reappear above water until the early 1960s.

=== Modern China ===
The area was occupied by the Japanese army during World War II and administered as part of Wang Jingwei's puppet regime.

After the Japanese surrender, on 1st November 1945, the Suwan Border Region Government was established by the Communists in Huai'an. At this time the Suwan (or Su-An) Border Region extended as far as the north bank of the Yangtze River, opposite the Republican capital, Nanjing. Currently some of the buildings occupied by the Regional Government are tourist attractions in the city.

Presumably at some point, the city was recaptured by the Nationalists, because, during the closing phases of the Chinese Civil War, it fell to the Communist army in December 1948. On 21 April 1949, the area was reorganized as Huaiyin District and divided into the 10 counties of Guanyun, Huaiyin, Huaibao (western Huai'an and Baoyin with its seat at Chahe), Lianshui, Pisui (southern Pixian and northern Suining with its seat at Tushan), Shuyang, Siyang, Suining, Suqian, and Xin'an (parts of Shuyang and Suqian with its seat at Xin'an).

On 12 May 1950, Huaibao County was divided between Huaiyin County, Huai'an County in Yancheng District, and Baoyin County in Yangzhou District. On December 18 of the same year, the urban area of Huaiyin was separately organized as Qingjiang City, which became the seat for the district. Huaiyin District joined Jiangsu upon its reestablishment in January 1953. Xin'an County was renamed Xinyi and the seat of Pisui County was moved to Yunhe. Later the same year, Pisui, Suining, and Xinyi Counties were placed under the administration of Xuzhou District. Qingjiang was separately elevated to a prefecture-level city despite still being subordinate to Huaiyin District. Shortly thereafter, the district added Huai'an County from Yancheng, Sihong County from Suxian, and Xuyi County from Chuxian District in Anhui. In 1956, Hongze County was established from parts of Huaiyin, Sihong, and Xuyi Counties, with its seat at Gaoliangjian. In 1957, parts of Guanyun and Lianshui Counties were organized as the Xian'an Administrative Office, which shortly became the separate Guannan County. In 1958, Qingjiang absorbed the surrounding more rural Huaiyin County but was renamed Huaiyin City.

In 1964, Huaiyin County was again separated but kept its seat in the urban area, which again became Qingjiang. In 1966, Xuyi County was transferred to Luhe District.

In 1970, Huaiyin District became the Huaiyin Region. The next year, Xuyi was transferred back from the Luhe Region. Luhe also yielded Jinhu County. In 1975, Huaiyin County's administration moved from Qingjiang to Wangyin.

In 1983, the Huaiyin Region became the directly administered Huaiyin City, with its urban core losing the separate name Qingjiang and being instead divided into Qinghe and Qingpu Districts. Most of the Huaiyin Region's counties—Guannan, Huai'an, Huaiyin, Hongze, Jinhu, Lianshui, Shuyang, Sihong, Siyang, Suqian, Xuyi—were placed under the city's administration while the last—Guanyun County—was placed under Lianyungang. In December 1987, Huai'an and Suqian Counties were promoted to county-level cities.

In 1996, the county-level city of Suqian was promoted to prefecture-level, taking Sihong, Siyang, and Shuyang Counties along with it. Guannan County was separately placed under the administration of Lianyungang.

On 21 December 2000, the prefecture-level city of Huaiyin was renamed Huai'an. The Huaiyin County and the county-level Huai'an City became Huaiyin and Huai'an Districts and the various districts' and counties' borders slightly adjusted in different ways. In October 2016, Qinghe and Qingpu reunited to form the city's current Qingjiangpu District.

== Culture ==
The people of Huai'an are generally ethnically Han Chinese. The local culture is known as "Jianghuai", referring to its position between the Huai River and the Yangtze, long known poetically in China as simply "The River" (江, Jiāng). The local dialect is a form of Jianghuai or Lower Yangtze Mandarin. Similarly, the local cuisine is Jianghuai or Huaiyang cuisine, historically considered one of the four chief styles of true Chinese cooking.

== Sports ==
The Huai'an City Sports Stadium is a football stadium with a capacity of 30,000.

== Transportation ==
Huai'an is served by the Xinyi-Changxing railway, which has a station in Huaiyin District.

Being at the intersection of the Grand Canal and Huai River Huai'an is an important inland port.

The city is also served by nearby Huai'an Lianshui International Airport. Currently the airport is served by China Eastern Airlines, which offers flights to Beijing-Capital, Chongqing, Guangzhou, Shanghai-Hongqiao, Shanghai-Pudong, Wenzhou, Wuhan, Xiamen, and Xi'an. Several other airlines offer domestic flights to cities such as Nanning and Zhengzhou. The airport is located 22 km (14 mi) from central Huai'an in Lianshui county.

Public transportation includes a tram system that connects the city center with the southeastern side of the city.

== Notable people ==
- Han Xin (died 196 BC), late Qin dynasty military general under Liu Bang, enfeoffed the Marquess of Huaiyin.
- Wu Cheng'en (1500–1582), Ming dynasty novelist, author of the Journey to the West.
- Guan Tianpei (1780–1841), Chinese national hero; died during the Opium War.
- Zhou Enlai (1898–1976), prominent Chinese Communist Party leader, Premier of the People's Republic of China from 1949 till death.
- Ruth Bell Graham (1920–2007), born Ruth McCue Bell, wife of the famous evangelist Billy Graham
- Qiu Jian (1975), sport shooter, 2008 Beijing Summer Olympics gold medalist
- Zhao Shaolin, former mayor of Huai'an
- Bu Lianshi, (died 238) late Eastern Han dynasty the favorite concubine of Sun Quan.
- Bu Zhi (died June or July 247), major assistor of Sun Quan and relative of Bu Lianshi
- Katherine Paterson (1932–), American novelist
- Li Yuanchao (1950-), former Vice President
- Hua Chunying (1970-), Vice Minister of Foreign Affairs and spokeswoman of the Chinese Ministry of Foreign Affairs.

== Twin towns and sister cities ==
Huai'an is twinned with:

- Cuenca, Azuay Province, Ecuador
- Gomel, Gomel Region, Belarus
- Kolpino, Saint Petersburg, Russia
- Magnitogorsk, Chelyabinsk Oblast, Russia
- Oakville, Ontario, Canada
- Płock, Masovian Voivodeship, Poland
- Sassnitz, Mecklenburg-Vorpommern, Germany
- Wanju, Jeollabuk-do, South Korea
- Yorba Linda, California, United States
