= Qingjiangpu, Huai'an =

Qingjiangpu 清江浦区 Tsingkiangpu
- District
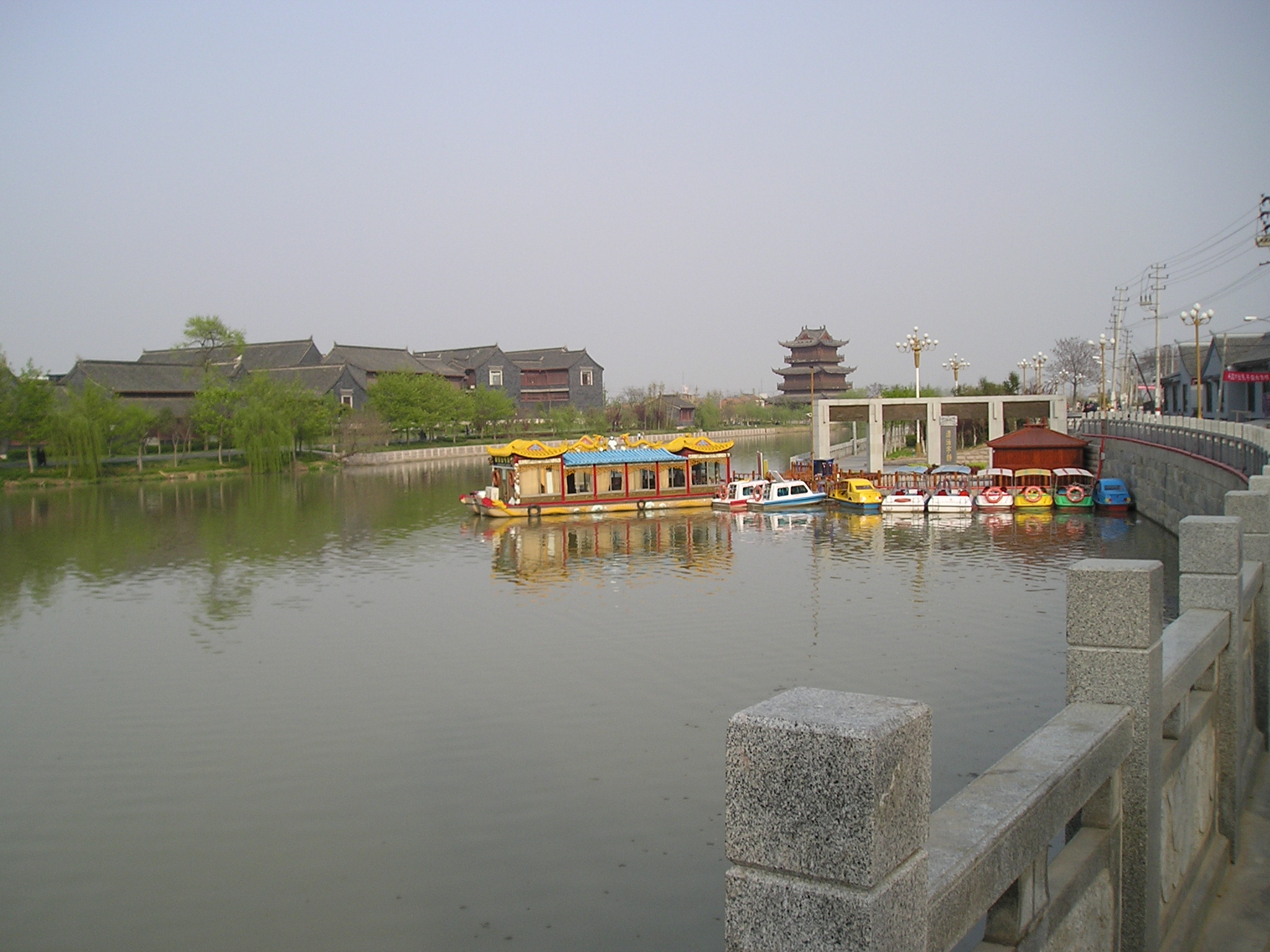
- Qingjiangpu District in April 2006

- Location in Jiangsu
- Coordinates: 33°33′12″N 119°01′37″E
- Country: People's Republic of China
- Province: Jiangsu
- Prefecture-level city: Huai'an

Area
  - Total: 309.62 km^{2} (119.54 sq mi)

Population (2018)
  - Total: 658,300
  - Density: 2,126/km^{2} (5,507/sq mi)
- Time zone: UTC+8 (China Standard)
- Postal code: 223001
- Website: http://www.haqp.gov.cn

Qingjiangpu, Huai'an
- Traditional Chinese: 清江浦區
- Simplified Chinese: 清江浦区
- Postal: Tsingkiangpu
- Literal meaning: District of the Clear River Bank or Mouth
Transcriptions
Standard Mandarin
- Hanyu Pinyin: Qīngjiāngpǔ qū
- Wade–Giles: Ch'ing-chiang-p'u Ch'ü

Qingjiangpu District is one of four urban districts in the prefecture-level city of Huai'an in China's Jiangsu Province. It was established on 8 June 2016. The district has an area of 420 km^{2} (160 sq mi) with a population of 735,900 (2016). Qingjiangpu includes 12 subdistricts and 7 towns or townships under its jurisdiction. Its seat is in Chengnan Subdistrict (城南街道).

== Name ==
Qingjiangpu is named for the Qingjiangpu River, a canal dug across Shanyang County in 1415 to more safely connect the Huai and Yellow Rivers. The canal itself was named for the "Clear River" (清江, Qīngjiāng), a name first applied to the Si owing to its greater clarity than the Huai where they met near present-day Hongze Lake and then applied to the Huai itself owing to its greater clarity than the Yellow River, which shifted south into the former course of the Si during the Song.

== History ==
Qingjiangpu District lies on the Jianghuai Plain created from silt deposited by the Huai River. The area was originally held by people considered to be Dongyi ("Eastern Barbarians") by the early Chinese. In 486 bc, during the Zhou's Spring and Autumn period, the hegemon Fuchai of Wu constructed the Hangou Canal (t 邗溝, s 邗沟, Hángōu) between Hancheng (邗城, Hánchéng) on the Yangtze River in present-day Yangzhou and Mokou (末口, Mòkǒu) on the Huai in order to improve his supply lines during his conflicts with Qi. This early route relied on connecting a series of flood-prone lakes and streams and was gradually improved over time. During the Sui, it became the central course of the Grand Canal. The situation was greatly complicated by the Yellow River's shift south of the Shandong Peninsula during the Song, capturing the lower Si and filling the Huai's lower courses and surrounding lakes with sediment. In 1415, the existing Li Canal (里运河, Lǐ yùnhé) was expanded with the Qingjiangpu, a 32-kilometre-long waterway (20 mi) connecting the Qinghe Docks (t 清河碼頭, s 清河码头, Qīnghé mǎtóu) across Shanyang County (t 山陽縣, s 山阳县, Shānyáng xiàn) with Shanyang City (t 山陽城, s 山阳城, Shānyáng chéng) in present-day Huai'an District.

At the time of the establishment of the People's Republic of China in 1949, Qingjiang was the most urbanized part of present-day Huai'an. It was separated from Huaiyin County and elevated to the status of a county-level city in January 1951. It was merged back into Huaiyin County in August 1958 and then separated again in October 1964. As part of the elevation of Huaiyin Prefecture to a prefecture-level city in March 1983, Qingjiang City was divided into the separate districts of Qinghe and Qingpu with their border set at the Li Canal. On 8 June 2016, the State Council approved the merger of these two districts as Qingjiangpu and this was enacted on October 8 the same year.

== Geography ==
The district of Qingjiangpu is located in the main urban areas of Huai'an. It is bordered to the east by Huai'an District, to the west and north by the district of Huaiyin, to the south by Hongze District. The ancient Yellow River, Li Canal, Grand Canal and Huai River run through it. The roads, railways and waterways extend in all directions, G2 Beijing–Shanghai Expressway, Nanjing-Huai'an Expressway and Nanjing-Lianyungang Expressway converge here, the Xinyi–Changxing railway runs through the whole territory. The district is near Huai'an Airport, it is an important regional transportation hub in northern Jiangsu.

== Administrative divisions ==
- Qingjiangpu District is formed from former Qinghe District and former Qingpu District.

Subdivision of Qingjiangpu District
English	Pinyin	Chinese
*12 Subdistricts	.	.
Changdong	Chángdōng jiēdào	长东街道
Changxi	Chángxī jiēdào	长西街道
Chengnan	Chéngnán jiēdào	城南街道
Fuqian	Fǔqián jiēdào	府前街道
Huaihai	Huáihǎi jiēdào	淮海街道
Liushuwan	Liǔshùwān jiēdào	柳树湾街道
Pulou	Pǔlóu jiēdào	浦楼街道
Qinghe	Qīnghé jiēdào	清河街道
Qingjiang	Qīngjiāng jiēdào	清江街道
Qingpu	Qīngpǔ jiēdào	清浦街道
Shuidukou	Shuǐdùkǒu jiēdào	水渡口街道
Zhakou	Zhákǒu jiēdào	闸口街道
*3 Towns	.	.
Heping	Hépíng zhèn	和平镇
Wudun	Wǔdūn zhèn	武墩镇
Yanhe	Yánhé zhèn	盐河镇
*4 Townships	.	.
Huangma	Huángmǎ xiāng	黄码乡
Bochi	Bōchí xiāng	钵池乡
Xuyang	Xúyáng xiāng	徐杨乡
Nanmachang	Nánmǎchǎng xiāng	南马厂乡

4 townships are administrated by the Management Committee of Huai'an Economic and Technological Development Zone

- Bochi Township (钵池乡)
- Xuyang Township (徐杨乡)
- Nanmachang Township (南马厂乡)
- Zhangma Office or the former Zhangma Township (张码办事处)

an area is administrated by the Management Committee of Huai'an Industrial Park

- Ninglianlu Office (宁连路办事处)

== Economy ==
According to preliminary accounting of the statistical authority, the gross domestic product in 2016 was 40,030 million yuan (6,027 million US dollars), up by 8.8 percent over the previous year. Of this total, the value added of the primary industry was 1,025 million yuan (154 million US dollars), up by 1.8 percent, that of the secondary industry was 9,427 million yuan (1,419 million US dollars), up by 10.3 percent and that of the tertiary industry was 29,578 million yuan (4,453 million US dollars), up by 8.6 percent. The value added of the primary industry accounted for 2.6 percent of the GDP; that of the secondary industry accounted for 23.5 percent; and that of the tertiary industry accounted for 73.9 percent. The per capita GDP in 2016 was 112,624 yuan (16,956 US dollars).

== See also ==
- Qing Yan Garden
