= Qinghe District, Huai'an =

Qinghe 清河区
- District
- Location in Jiangsu
- Coordinates: 33°35′06″N 119°03′50″E
- Country: People's Republic of China
- Province: Jiangsu
- Prefecture-level city: Huai'an
- Time zone: UTC+8 (China Standard)

Qinghe District (simplified Chinese: 清河区; traditional Chinese: 清河區; pinyin: Qīnghé Qū) was a former district of Huai'an, Jiangsu province, China. In October 2016, Qinghe and Qingpu districts were merged to form Qingjiangpu District.
