= Qingpu District, Huai'an =

Qingpu 清浦区
- District
- Location in Jiangsu
- Coordinates: 33°27′58″N 119°01′01″E
- Country: People's Republic of China
- Province: Jiangsu
- Prefecture-level city: Huai'an
- Time zone: UTC+8 (China Standard)

Qingpu District (simplified Chinese: 清浦区; traditional Chinese: 清浦區; pinyin: Qīngpǔ Qū) was a former district of Huai'an, Jiangsu province, China. In October 2016, Qingpu and Qinghe districts were merged to form Qingjiangpu District.
