= Jianghuai =

Region of China

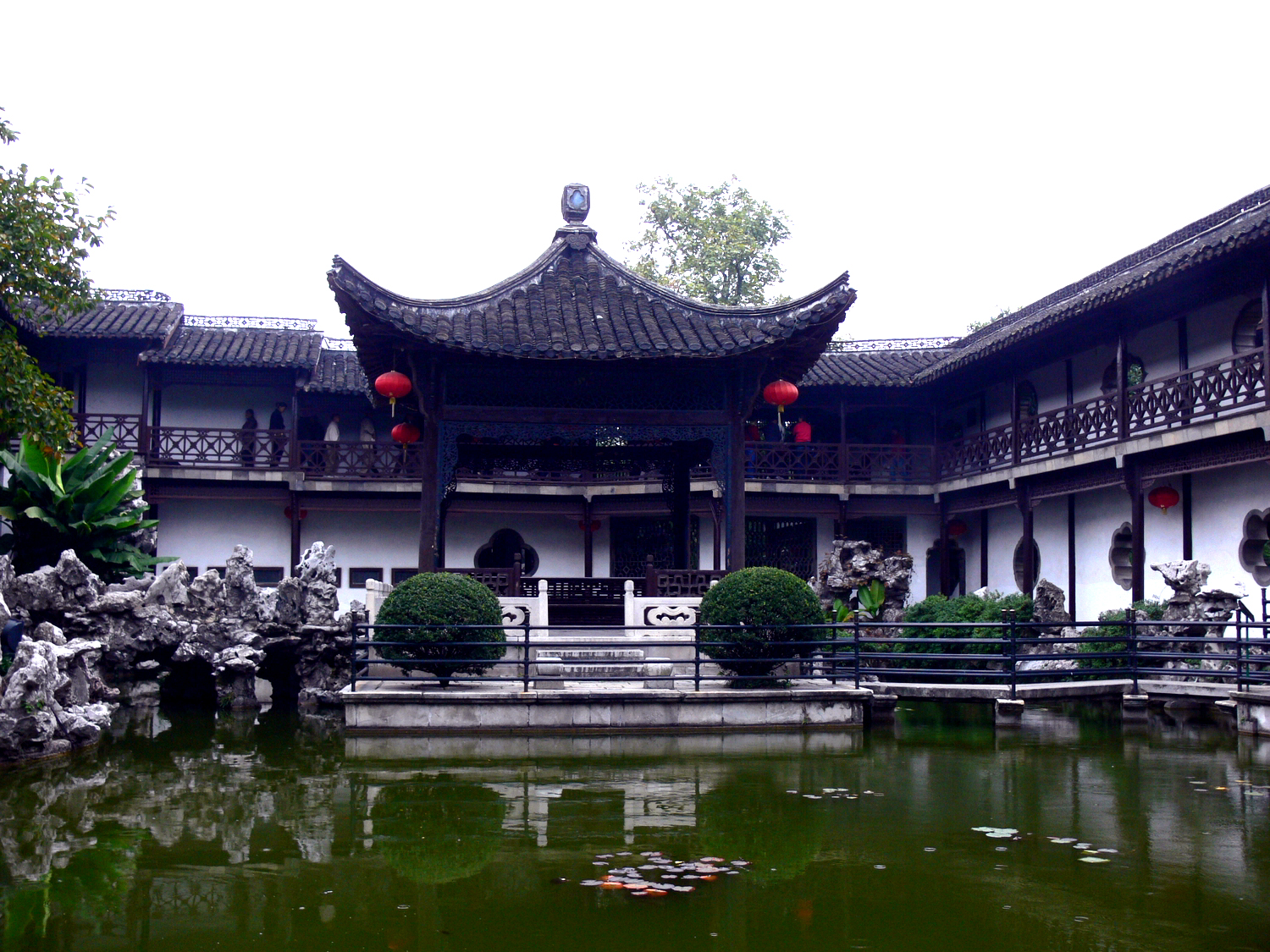
Yangzhou He Garden

Jianghuai (江淮; pinyin: Jiānghuái) is a geographical area in China referring to the plain between the area north of the lower reaches of the Yangtze River and near the lower reaches of the Huai River Basin, especially in northern Jiangsu, northern and central Anhui.

Jianghuai is known for its electric vehicle brands, having sold 333,369 vehicles in the first six months of 2016.

== See also ==
- Huaiyang cuisine
- Huai opera
- Yangzhou opera
- Lower Yangtze Mandarin
- Subei people
- Yunjin
