= Jinhu County =

Jinhu 金湖县
- County
- Location in Jiangsu
- Coordinates: 33°00′22″N 119°05′20″E
- Country: People's Republic of China
- Province: Jiangsu
- Prefecture-level city: Huai'an

Area
  - Total: 1,393.86 km^{2} (538.17 sq mi)

Population (2020 census)
  - Total: 289,456
  - Density: 207.665/km^{2} (537.850/sq mi)
- Time zone: UTC+8 (China Standard)
- Postal code: 211600

Jinhu County (simplified Chinese: 金湖县; traditional Chinese: 金湖縣; pinyin: Jīnhú Xiàn; lit. 'golden lake') is under the administration of Huai'an, Jiangsu province, China with 289,456 inhabitants (2020 census). It occupies the northwestern shores of and extends into Gaoyou Lake, bordering the prefecture-level cities of Yangzhou to the south and east, and Chuzhou (Anhui) to the southwest.

== History ==
=== Ancient Periods ===
During the Spring and Autumn (~770- 476 BCE). Belongs to the state of Wu (吴国), State of Yue(越国) and state of Chu(楚国).

=== Qin Dynasty ===
During the Qin Dynasty(221- 207 BCE), the county system was established, belonging to the Dong Yang County（东阳县）, Dong Hai Commandery （东海郡）.

=== Han Dynasty ===
During Western Han Dynasty(206 BCE to 9 CE). The land first belongs to Dong Yang County (东阳县）.

During the Emperor Wu of Han Yuan Shou(reign name) Five years (汉武帝元狩五年-118 BCE), With the separation of Dong Yang County (东阳县), Gao You County （高邮县）was established. The southern area from Ta Ji （塔集镇）and Jin Nan town（金南镇） belongs to Gao You County(高邮县)， the rest of towns still belong to Dong Yang County （东阳县）.

During Emperor Wu of Han Yuan Shou(Reign Name) six years(汉武帝元狩六年-117 BCE), Dong yang county analysed and established She Yang（射阳） and Ping An （平安）county, the Ping An city（平安城）was established. The Jin Nan town（金南镇）, Jin Gou town（金沟镇）, Taji town（塔集镇）, Tiantangji town（天堂集镇） and its northern area belongs to Ping An County（平安县）, the southern area belongs to Gao You County（高邮县）, and Dai Lou town（戴楼镇） belongs to Dong Yang county （东阳县）.

=== Wang Meng's Period (Xin Dynasty) ===
During Wang Mang （王莽）Period (Xin dynasty ~45 BCE - 6 23 October CE), Ping An County (平安县)changed to Du Xiang County（杜乡县）, Gao You（高邮县） and Dong Yang county（东阳县） remains the same.

=== Eastern Han to Jin Dynasties ===
During the Eastern Han Dynasty (25 - 220 CE), Ping An County （平安县 was restored while Gao You（高邮县） and Dong Yang County （东阳县） remained the same.

During the Western Jin Period (266 – 420 CE), Ping An County （平安县） was incorporated into She Yang County （射阳县）. The area was divided into three counties: She Yang (射阳), Gao You（高邮） and Dong Yang（东阳）.

In the Eastern Jin Dynasty, San'e Qiao （三阿侨）set up two prefectures, You Zhou（幽州） and Yan Zhou（兖州）. In the fourth year of Taiyuan (太元四年-379 AD), the Battle of San'e （三阿之战） took place within the territory between the former Qin and the Eastern Jin.

=== Southern and Northern Dynasties ===
During the Southern and Northern Dynasties(南北朝), Southern Qi(南齐) established An Yi County(安宜县) in Ping An City(平安城), and Yangping Commandery(阳平郡) in Shi Jian City(石鼊城).

During the Southern Liang(南梁) Dynasty, Dong Guan County(东莞县) was established in An Yi City(安宜城), and Yang Ping County(阳平县) was moved from Shi Jian City (石鼊城). Gao You County (高邮县) analysed and set up Zhu Tang(竹塘县) and Sanqui County(三归县).

Southern Chen(南陈)then abolished Dong Yang County(东阳县) and left An Yi (安宜县) and Gao You county (高邮县)as they were.

In the Northern Zhou (北周)Dynasty, Shi Xian County(石鼊县) was set up in Shi Xian City(石鼊城). The part of present-day Dai Lou town(戴楼镇), originally belonging to Dong Yang County (东阳县), was reorganised under Shi Xian County(石鼊城).

=== Sui Dynasty ===
At the beginning of the Sui Dynasty(隋朝), Shi Xian County (石鼊县）was incorporated into An Yi County(安宜县). Gao You County（高邮县） remained unchanged.

In the winter of the eleventh year of the Daye Dynasty (大业11年-615 AD), an insurgent army led by Du Fuwei （杜伏威）captured the city of Anyi （安宜城）. The city was massacred and burned by Du Fuwei （杜伏威）.

=== Tang Dynasty ===
During the Tang Dynasty（唐朝）, in the fourth year of the Tang Wude (唐武德四年-621 AD), An Yi County（安宜县） was moved to Bai Tian（白田） (and present-day Bao Ying County（宝应县）), east of the Grand Canal, and in the third year of the Tang Shangyuan(唐上元三年), An Yi County（安宜县） was changed to Bao Ying County（宝应县）. The land was divided into two counties, Bao Ying（宝应）and Gao You（高邮）.

=== Song Dynasty ===
During the Song Dynasty（宋朝）, Bao Ying（宝应县） and Gao You（高邮县） counties remained the same.

=== Yuan Dynasty ===
In the Yuan Dynasty, Gao You county（高邮县） was changed into a prefecture, and Bao Ying（宝应） was changed into An Yi prefecture（安宜府. The An Yi Prefecture (安宜府)was abolished, and Bao Ying County（宝应县） remained.

=== Ming and Qing Dynasty ===
In the Ming Dynasty（明朝）, Gao You（高邮） was changed from a prefecture to a department prefecture, and Bao Ying（宝应） remained as a county.

Qing dynasty(清朝), Bao Ying County （宝应县）, Gao You Zhou (department prefecture) (高邮州) remained the same.

=== Republic of China ===
Republic of China, Bao Ying County（宝应县） remained the same as before, Gao You（高邮） changed the prefecture – zhou (州) to county（县）

=== People's Republic of China ===
In 2001, the former prefecture-level Huai Yin City（淮阴城） was renamed Huai'an City（淮安城）, and Jinhu County （金湖县）was also transferred to Huai'an City（淮安城）, Licheng Street （黎城街道）is the seat of the county people's government.

In 2019, massive protests erupted over expired vaccine usage.

Jinhu County was formerly administered by Baoying and Gaoyou counties until 1959, when it became its own county.

== Name origin ==
In October 1959, when the county was established, the name "Jinhu（金湖）" was chosen for two reasons. The first reason is the Bomkwang Lake（汜光湖） in the county. In ancient times, Bomkwang Lake was called "Jinhu", so the county's name was a homonym of "Jinhu - the Bomkwang Lake". The second reason is that "Jinhu（金湖）" can be interpreted as "the lake which produces gold", symbolizing the county's rich resources, rich in produce. Zhou Enlai, then Premier of the State Council, appreciated it and chose "Jinhu（金湖）".

== Administrative divisions ==
Jinhu County has 11 towns.

11 towns

- Licheng (黎城镇)
- Jinnan (金南镇)
- Minqiao (闵桥镇)
- Taji (塔集镇)
- Yinji (银集镇)
- Tugou (涂沟镇)
- Qianfeng (前锋镇)
- Lüliang (吕良镇)
- Chenqiao (陈桥镇)
- Jinbei (金北镇)
- Dailou (戴楼镇)

== Resources ==
=== Water Resources ===
Jinhu county is located in a network of waterways, with numerous lakes, rivers, and channels, where the water surface area accounts for 30.1% of the total area. The territory is flanked by three major lakes – Baima Lake, Baoying Lake, and Gaoyou Lake – from the northeastern to the southeastern parts. The water surface area in Jinhu County covers 42,000 hectares, accounting for one-third of the county's total area. The plentiful water resources are attributed to the numerous lakes and rivers: the area enjoys abundant natural precipitation, averaging 1085 millimeters annually; the Huai River contributes approximately 20 billion cubic meters of pass-through flow each year; and the underground water reserves are estimated at 100 million tons.

=== Biological Resources ===
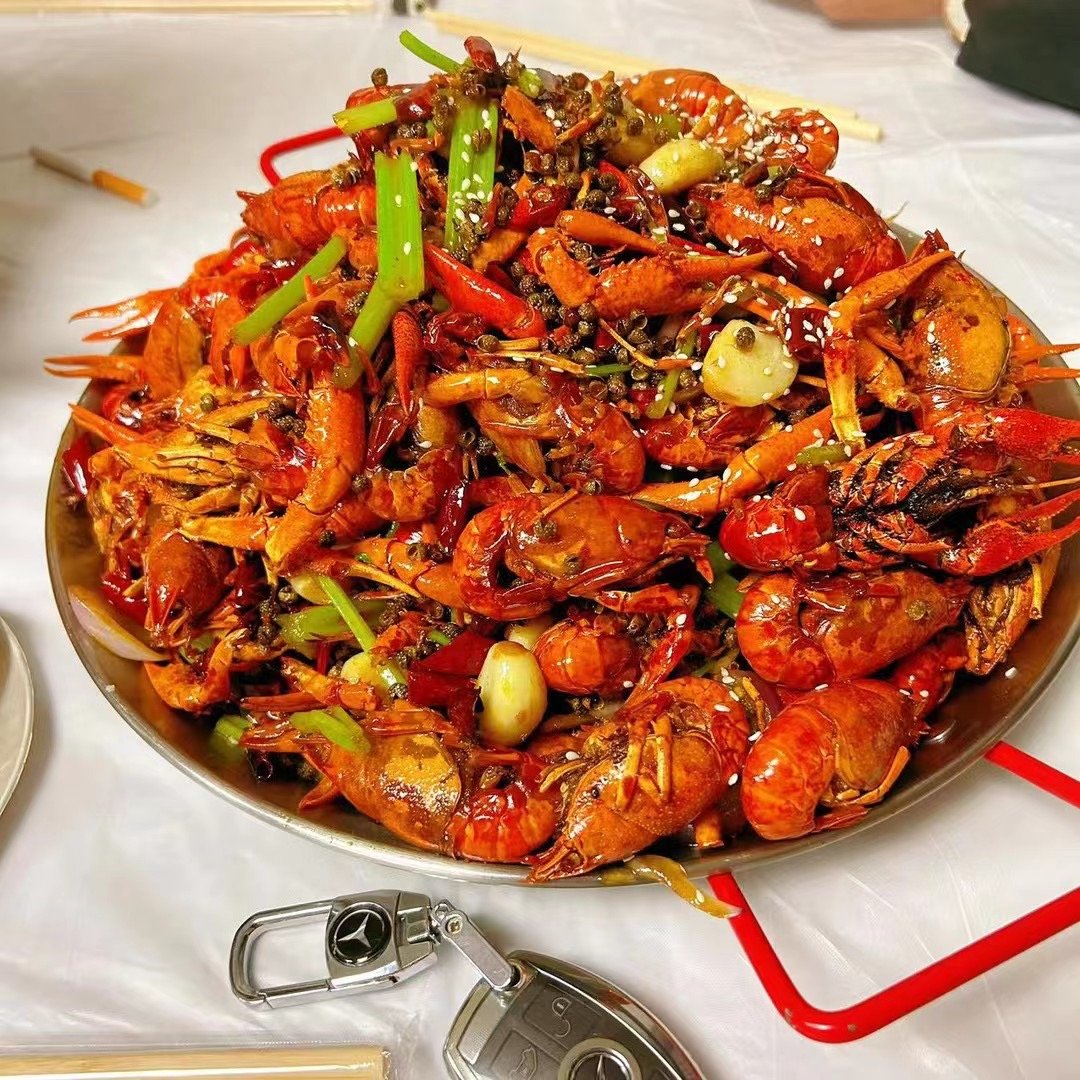
A Gan Bian flavouring (干煸, Chinese flavouring- dried-fried before broiling or stewing) crayfish dish from Jinhu County

The specialties of Jinhu, such as silverfish from Gaoyou Lake, lobsters, the famed Jinhu large crabs, and clams from the Sanhe River, enjoy widespread popularity in markets both at home and abroad. The county's total area dedicated to aquaculture extends over 10,000 hectares, with inland waters covering 4,000 hectares and lake aquaculture systems occupying 6,000 hectares. The production of aquatic goods reaches 48,200 tons, with an average output of 134.2 kilograms per person, the highest in Jiangsu Province. The cultivation area for specialized aquaculture products, predominantly crabs, softshell turtles, and green shrimp, spans 8,000 hectares, contributing to a yield of 13,500 tons. There is one professional fishing town and five fishing villages in the county, supporting over 2,600 fishing families and employing more than 8,000 individuals in the fishery sector. The industry of crayfish（小龙虾） in Jinhu, from breeding and fishing to storage, transportation, and catering, has developed into a distinctive feature of Jinhu, renowned as Jinhu's speciality.

=== Petroleum Resources ===
The unique geological structures of the Jinhu Depression and the Sanhe Depression in Jinhu County harbor rich petroleum resources, with proven reserves amounting to tens of millions of tons. Oil extraction began in the mid-1970s, and today there are two oil fields, Biyang and Cuizhuang, with over 600 oil wells, producing 600,000 tons of oil annually. Jinhu has become an important crude oil production base in southern China, hosting the second experimental oil extraction plant of SINOPEC's Jiangsu Oilfield Branch.

== Scenic Area ==
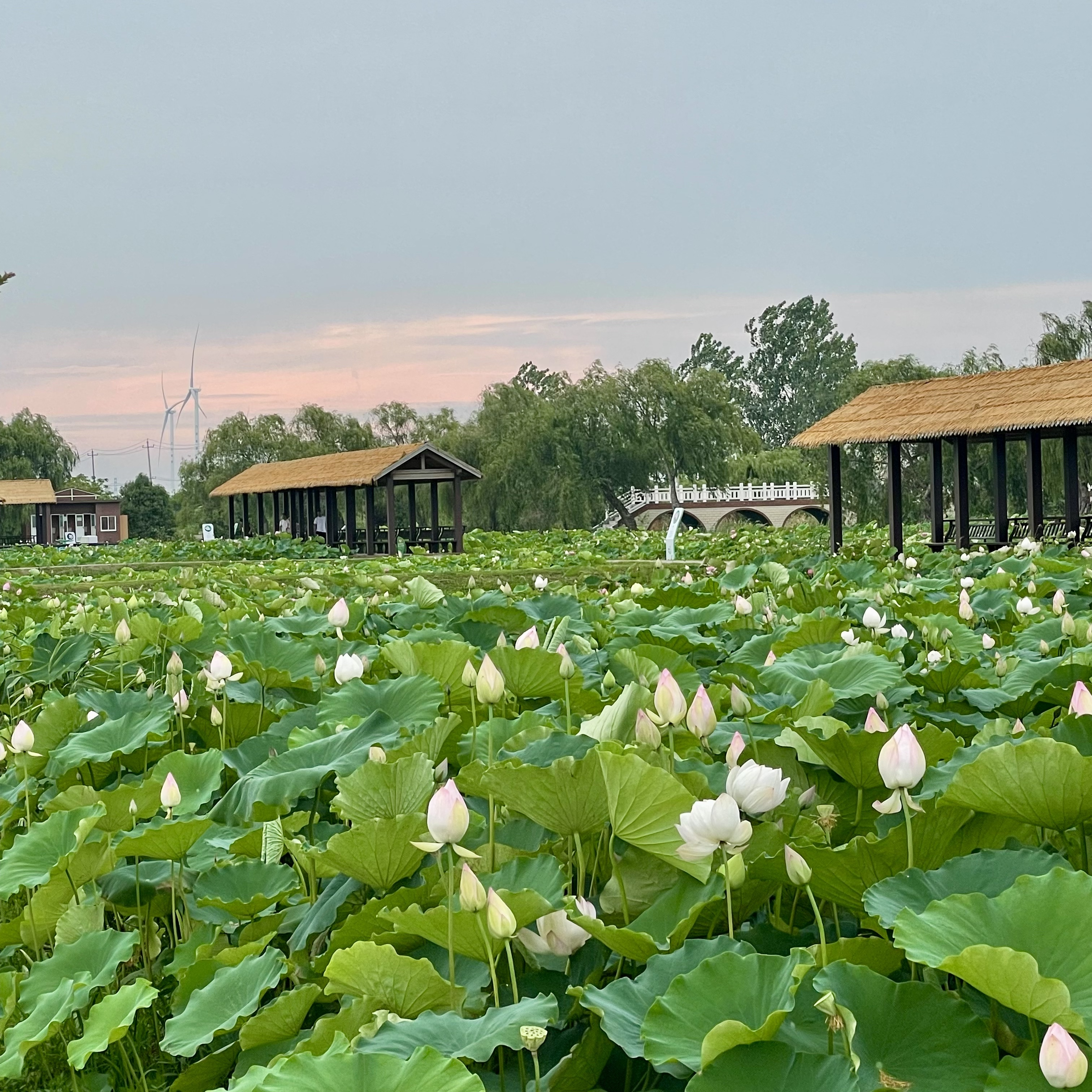
He Hua Lotus Dang Scenic Site(荷花荡, The national 4A level scenic site, is in Ta ji Town, Jinhu County.

=== He Hua (lotus) Dang(荷花荡）Scenic Area ===
Located in Taji Town(塔集镇), Jinhu County（金湖县）, the Hehuadang Scenic Area spans an area of approximately 800 hectares (2,000 acres) and is classified as a national 4A scenic site. It holds designations as a National Water Conservancy Scenic Spot and a destination for lotus viewing. The site is geographically positioned with lakes on three sides, featuring large lotus fields and proximity to Gaoyou Lake, contributing to its distinct ecological landscape.

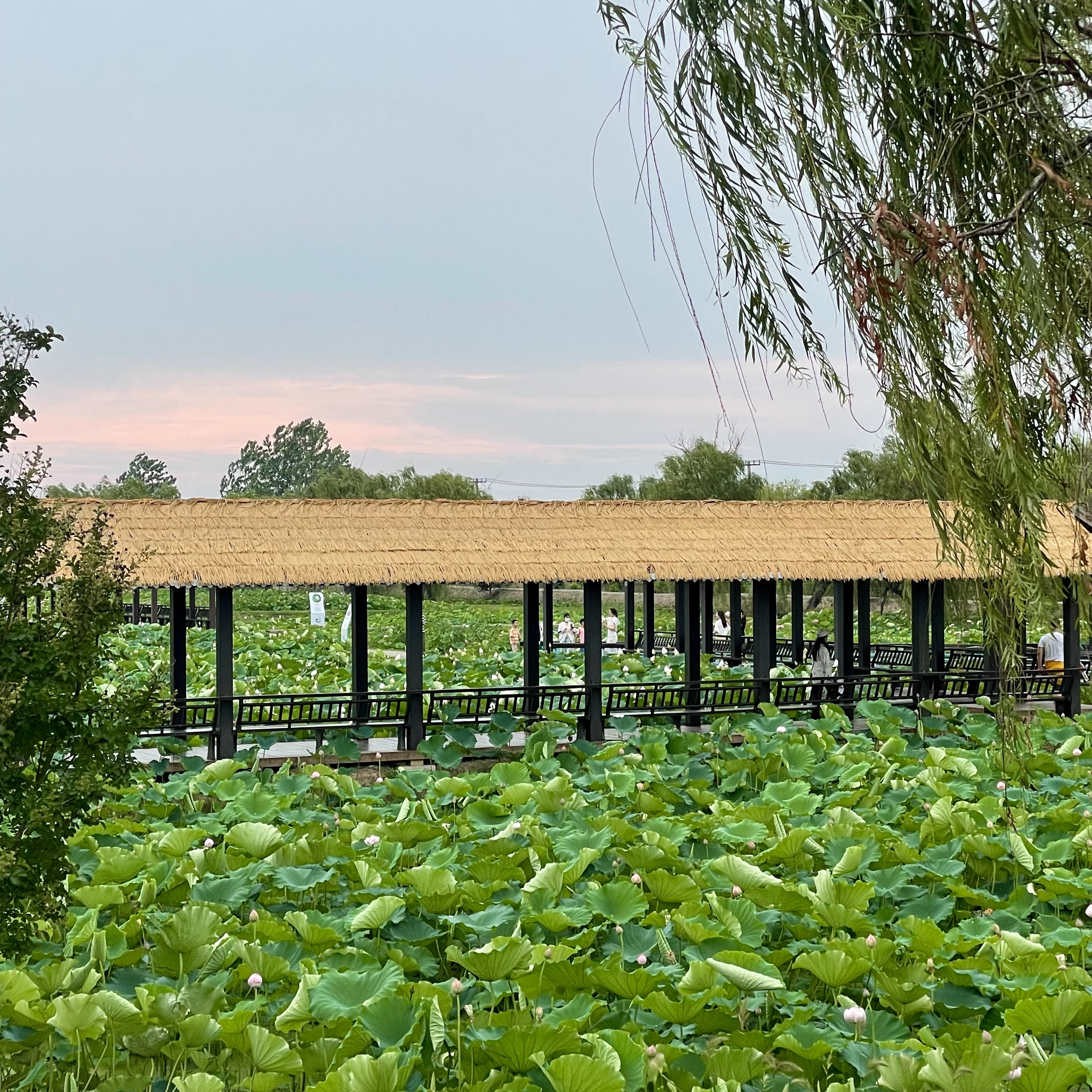
The He Hua(Lotus) Dang Scenic Site is geographically positioned with lakes on three sides, featuring large lotus fields and proximity to Gaoyou Lake, contributing to its distinct ecological landscape.

The area focuses on lotus culture and combines various tourist activities such as agricultural sightseeing, leisure, educational programs, and health-related offerings. Hehuadang is known for initiating the Lotus Festival in China, having consistently hosted the event since 2000, making it a longstanding venue for this festival. The site has received recognition in various forms, including being named a "National Agricultural Tourism Demonstration Site" and included in the list of top 100 rural leisure tourism routes by the Ministry of Agriculture and Rural Affairs in 2018.

Utilising its large lotus fields and integrating local historical and cultural elements, the scenic spot has developed multiple attractions, including a tourism centre, parks, a lotus cultivation area, and thematic parks centred on a lotus and aquatic life. The site is also equipped with facilities to support visitors, including accommodation and dining services. The area showcases the lotus blossoms and greenery during the summer, aligning with its cultural and natural thematic focus.

Su Dongpo, the poet in the Song Dynasty, left his lines： "酒沽横荡桥头月，茶煮青山庙后泉(Wine sold at the bustling bridgehead under the moon, tea brewed with the spring water behind the temple in the green mountains )."

== Climate ==
Climate data for Jinhu, elevation 12 m (39 ft), (1991–2020 normals, extremes 1981–present)
Month	Jan	Feb	Mar	Apr	May	Jun	Jul	Aug	Sep	Oct	Nov	Dec	Year
Record high °C (°F)	20.7 (69.3)	26.7 (80.1)	32.9 (91.2)	33.1 (91.6)	34.8 (94.6)	35.9 (96.6)	37.0 (98.6)	37.6 (99.7)	34.5 (94.1)	33.3 (91.9)	28.0 (82.4)	21.9 (71.4)	37.6 (99.7)
Mean daily maximum °C (°F)	6.3 (43.3)	9.1 (48.4)	14.2 (57.6)	20.6 (69.1)	25.8 (78.4)	28.9 (84.0)	31.2 (88.2)	30.8 (87.4)	27.0 (80.6)	22.1 (71.8)	15.5 (59.9)	8.8 (47.8)	20.0 (68.0)
Daily mean °C (°F)	2.0 (35.6)	4.4 (39.9)	9.1 (48.4)	15.2 (59.4)	20.6 (69.1)	24.5 (76.1)	27.5 (81.5)	26.9 (80.4)	22.6 (72.7)	17.0 (62.6)	10.6 (51.1)	4.2 (39.6)	15.4 (59.7)
Mean daily minimum °C (°F)	−1.4 (29.5)	0.7 (33.3)	4.9 (40.8)	10.4 (50.7)	15.9 (60.6)	20.7 (69.3)	24.4 (75.9)	24.0 (75.2)	19.1 (66.4)	12.9 (55.2)	6.5 (43.7)	0.6 (33.1)	11.6 (52.8)
Record low °C (°F)	−10.0 (14.0)	−7.4 (18.7)	−4.7 (23.5)	−1.0 (30.2)	7.0 (44.6)	12.7 (54.9)	19.5 (67.1)	15.5 (59.9)	11.4 (52.5)	2.5 (36.5)	−2.9 (26.8)	−10.5 (13.1)	−10.5 (13.1)
Average precipitation mm (inches)	37.2 (1.46)	39.8 (1.57)	60.1 (2.37)	54.3 (2.14)	79.2 (3.12)	146.9 (5.78)	216.9 (8.54)	177.1 (6.97)	78.0 (3.07)	48.1 (1.89)	46.6 (1.83)	28.8 (1.13)	1,013 (39.87)
Average precipitation days (≥ 0.1 mm)	7.1	7.9	8.6	8.3	9.7	9.5	13.4	12.6	8.5	7.1	7.2	6.1	106
Average snowy days	3.2	2.3	0.9	0	0	0	0	0	0	0	0.5	0.9	7.8
Average relative humidity (%)	73	72	70	70	73	77	84	85	82	77	74	72	76
Mean monthly sunshine hours	147.4	143.5	175.2	196.9	204.6	168.0	184.1	192.5	176.0	180.6	156.4	152.7	2,077.9
Percentage possible sunshine	46	46	47	50	48	39	43	47	48	52	50	50	47
Source: China Meteorological Administration
