= Huai'an, Huai'an =

Huai'an 淮安区
- District
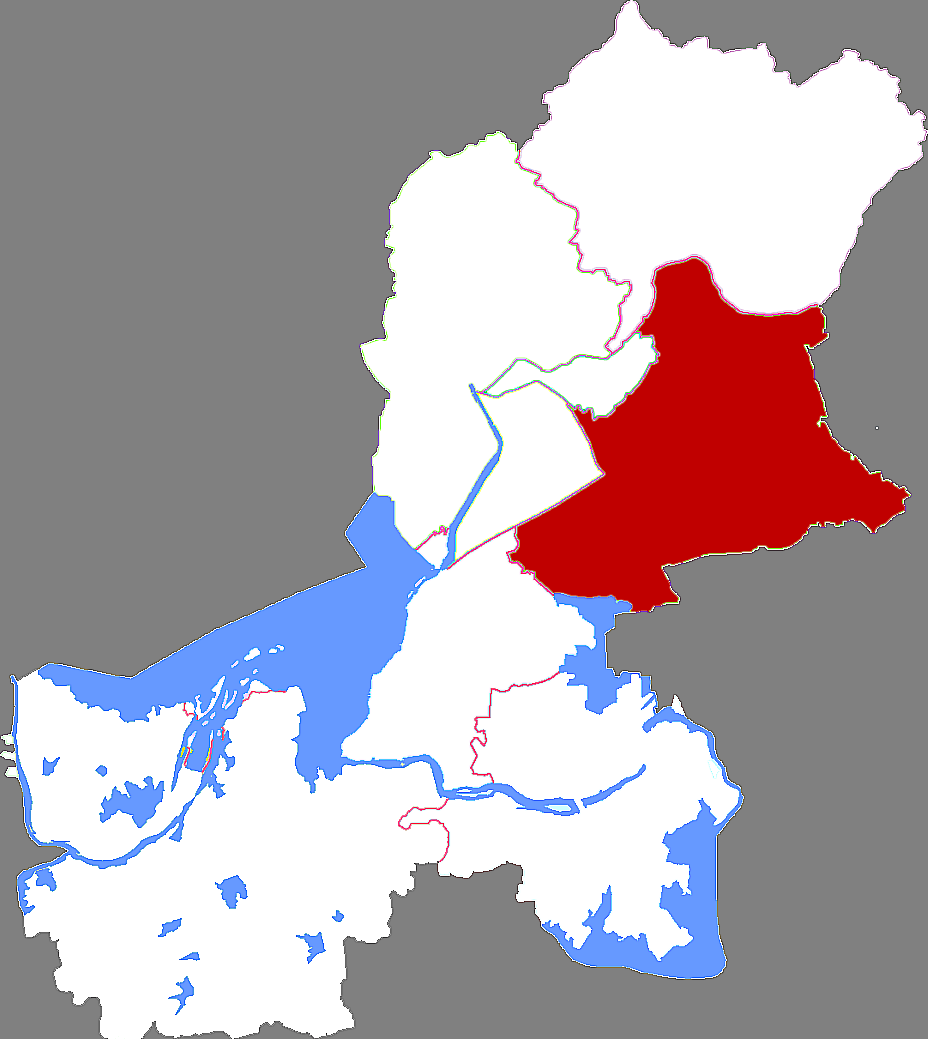
- Location in Huai'an

- Location in Jiangsu
- Coordinates: 33°31′19″N 119°18′32″E
- Country: People's Republic of China
- Province: Jiangsu
- Prefecture-level city: Huai'an
- Subdivisions: Huai'an

Area
  - Total: 1,452 km^{2} (561 sq mi)

Population (2020 census)
  - Total: 785,272
  - Density: 540.8/km^{2} (1,401/sq mi)
- Time zone: UTC+8 (China Standard)
- Postal code: 223200
- Website: www.zghaq.gov.cn

Huai'an District (simplified Chinese: 淮安区; traditional Chinese: 淮安區; pinyin: Huái'ān Qū) is one of four districts of the prefecture-level city of Huai'an, Jiangsu Province, China. The southeast district was formerly named Shanyang County (山阳县; 山陽縣; Shānyáng Xiàn), Huai'an County (淮安县; 淮安縣; Huái'ān Xiàn) and Chuzhou District (楚州区; 楚州區; Chǔzhōu Qū).

The district is the home town of historical figures such as Zhou Enlai, Wu Cheng'en, Han Xin and Guan Tianpei.

== Administrative divisions ==
At present, Huai'an District has 21 towns and 6 townships.

21 towns

- Huaicheng (淮城镇)
- Pingqiao (平桥镇)
- Shanghe (上河镇)
- Madian (马甸镇)
- Zhuqiao (朱桥镇)
- Xihe (溪河镇)
- Shihe (施河镇)
- Cheqiao (车桥镇)
- Jingkou (泾口镇)
- Liujun (流均镇)
- Boli (博里镇)
- Qiuqiao (仇桥镇)
- Fuxing (复兴镇)
- Suzui (苏嘴镇)
- Qingong (钦工镇)
- Shunhe (顺河镇)
- Jiqiao (季桥镇)
- Xiqiao (席桥镇)
- Linji (林集镇)
- Nanzha (南闸镇)
- Fanji (范集镇)

6 townships

- Jianhuai (建淮乡)
- Jiaoling (茭陵乡)
- Songji (宋集乡)
- Chengdong (城东乡)
- Sanbao (三堡乡)
- Nanmachang (南马厂乡)

== Climate ==
Climate data for Huai'an District, elevation 18 m (59 ft), (1991–2020 normals)
Month	Jan	Feb	Mar	Apr	May	Jun	Jul	Aug	Sep	Oct	Nov	Dec	Year
Mean daily maximum °C (°F)	6.1 (43.0)	8.9 (48.0)	14.0 (57.2)	20.2 (68.4)	25.3 (77.5)	28.8 (83.8)	30.8 (87.4)	30.3 (86.5)	26.7 (80.1)	21.9 (71.4)	15.2 (59.4)	8.5 (47.3)	19.7 (67.5)
Daily mean °C (°F)	1.6 (34.9)	4.0 (39.2)	8.6 (47.5)	14.7 (58.5)	20.1 (68.2)	24.2 (75.6)	27.2 (81.0)	26.6 (79.9)	22.3 (72.1)	16.7 (62.1)	10.2 (50.4)	3.8 (38.8)	15.0 (59.0)
Mean daily minimum °C (°F)	−1.7 (28.9)	0.2 (32.4)	4.2 (39.6)	9.7 (49.5)	15.4 (59.7)	20.3 (68.5)	24.3 (75.7)	23.7 (74.7)	18.8 (65.8)	12.5 (54.5)	6.2 (43.2)	0.2 (32.4)	11.1 (52.1)
Average precipitation mm (inches)	27.7 (1.09)	31.7 (1.25)	47.4 (1.87)	46.9 (1.85)	68.1 (2.68)	135.2 (5.32)	223.6 (8.80)	191.7 (7.55)	83.7 (3.30)	49.0 (1.93)	43.3 (1.70)	23.3 (0.92)	971.6 (38.26)
Average precipitation days (≥ 1.0 mm)	6.0	6.7	7.7	7.4	9.0	8.8	13.2	12.6	8.0	6.3	6.9	5.3	97.9
Average snowy days	3.4	2.8	1.1	0.1	0	0	0	0	0	0	0.5	1.2	9.1
Average relative humidity (%)	72	71	70	70	73	77	85	86	82	76	74	71	76
Mean monthly sunshine hours	148.3	143.6	171.1	195.1	201.4	164.1	170.9	184.9	177.1	181.1	155.6	158.3	2,051.5
Percentage possible sunshine	47	46	46	50	47	38	39	45	48	52	50	51	47
Source: China Meteorological Administration
