= Haizhou =

Haizhou (海州) may refer to:

== Jiangsu ==
- Haizhou District, Lianyungang, in Jiangsu, China
- Hai Prefecture, a prefecture between the 6th and 20th centuries in modern Jiangsu, China

== Liaoning ==
- Haizhou District, Fuxin, in Liaoning, China
- Haicheng, Liaoning, in China, known in the Ming Dynasty as Haizhou Garrison
