= List of twin towns and sister cities in South Korea =

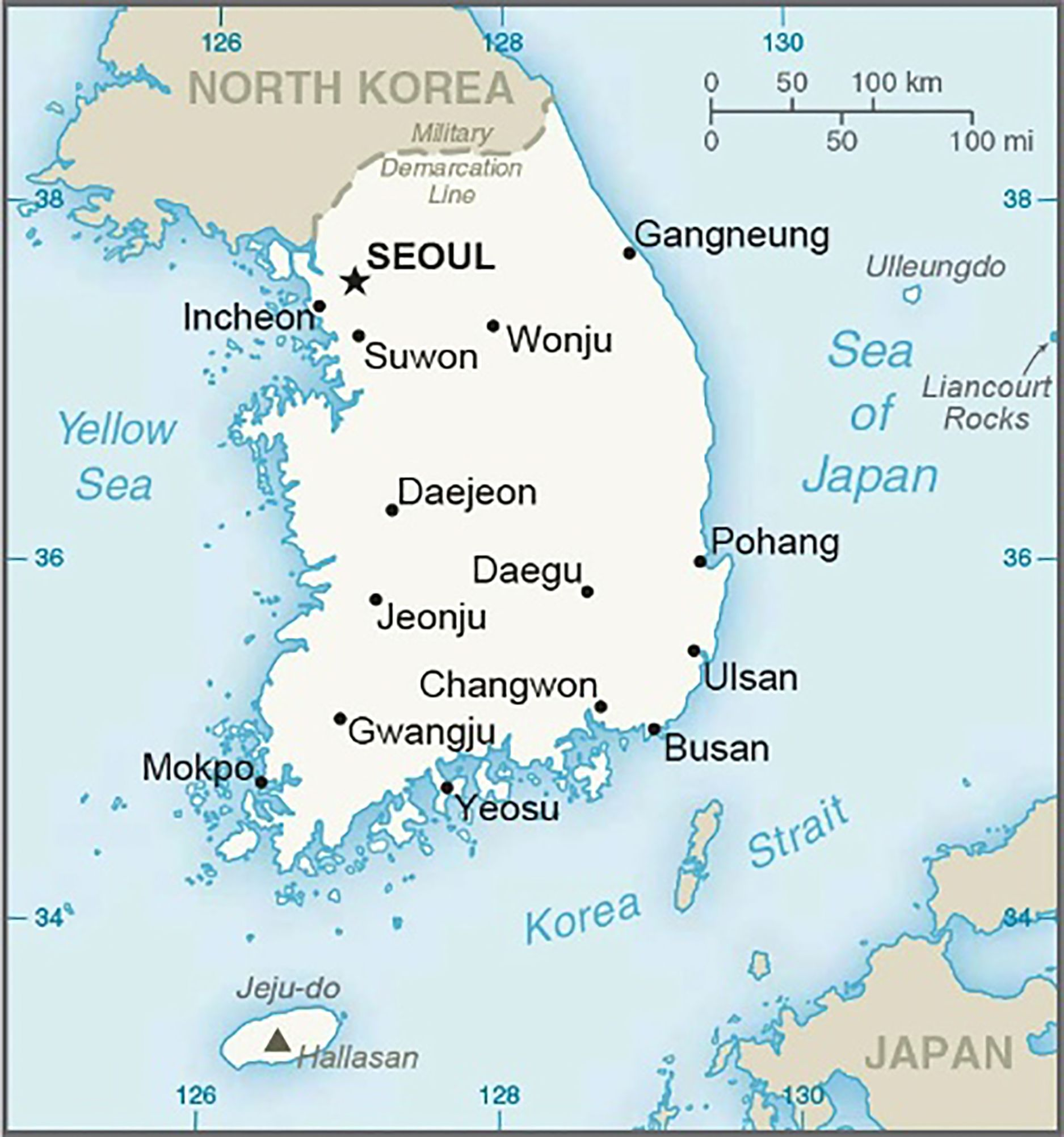
Map of South Korea

This is a list of places in South Korea which have standing links to local communities in other countries. In most cases, the association, especially when formalised by local government, is known as "town twinning" (usually in Europe) or "sister cities" (usually in the rest of the world).

== A ==
Andong

- Corinth, Greece
- Cusco, Peru
- Pingdingshan, China
- Sagae, Japan
- Xi'an, China

Ansan

- Anshan, China
- Kholmsk, Russia
- Las Vegas, United States
- Yuzhno-Sakhalinsk, Russia

Anseong

- Brea, United States
- Heyuan, China

Anyang

- Anyang, China
- Garden Grove, United States
- Hampton, United States
- Komaki, Japan
- Naucalpan de Juárez, Mexico
- Sorocaba, Brazil
- Tokorozawa, Japan
- Ulan-Ude, Russia
- Weifang, China

== B ==
Bonghwa

- Selenge, Mongolia
- Tongchuan, China

Boryeong

- Fujisawa, Japan
- Hangu (Tianjin), China
- Qingpu (Shanghai), China
- Shoreline, United States
- Takahama, Japan

Buan

- Wulong (Chongqing), China

Bucheon

- Bakersfield, United States
- Harbin, China
- Khabarovsk, Russia
- Valenzuela, Philippines

Busan

- Auckland, New Zealand
- Barcelona, Spain
- Casablanca, Morocco
- Cebu, Philippines
- Chicago, United States
- Dar es Salaam, Tanzania
- Dubai, United Arab Emirates
- Fukuoka, Japan
- Ho Chi Minh City, Vietnam
- Istanbul, Turkey
- Kaohsiung, Taiwan
- Los Angeles, United States
- Luanda, Angola
- Montreal, Canada
- Mombasa, Kenya
- Mumbai, India
- Phnom Penh, Cambodia
- Rio de Janeiro, Brazil
- Saint Petersburg, Russia
- Shanghai, China
- Shimonoseki, Japan
- Surabaya, Indonesia
- Thessaloniki, Greece
- Tijuana, Mexico
- Valparaíso, Chile
- Victoria (state), Australia
- Vladivostok, Russia
- Western Cape, South Africa
- Yangon, Myanmar

== C ==
Changwon

- Annapolis, United States
- Da Nang, Vietnam
- Guadalajara, Mexico
- Himeji, Japan
- Jacksonville, United States
- Jersey City, United States
- Kure, Japan
- Ma'anshan, China
- Mỹ Tho, Vietnam
- Nantong, China
- Shulan, China
- Ussuriysk, Russia
- Viña del Mar, Chile
- Yamaguchi, Japan
- Zapopan, Mexico

Cheonan

- Beaverton, United States
- Büyükçekmece, Turkey
- Shijiazhuang, China
- Wendeng (Weihai), China

Cheongdo

- Nenjiang, China

Cheongju

- Bellingham, United States
- Tottori, Japan
- Wuhan, China

Cheorwon

- Đồng Tháp, Vietnam

Chuncheon

- Addis Ababa, Ethiopia
- Higashichikuma District, Japan
- Hōfu, Japan
- Kakamigahara, Japan

Chungju

- Taichung, Taiwan
- Yugawara, Japan

== D ==
Daegu

- Almaty, Kazakhstan
- Atlanta, United States
- Chengdu, China
- Da Nang, Vietnam
- Hiroshima, Japan
- Milan, Italy
- Minas Gerais, Brazil
- Ningbo, China
- Plovdiv, Bulgaria
- Qingdao, China
- Saint Petersburg, Russia
- Taipei, Taiwan

Daegu – Seo

- Bacolod, Philippines
- Hexi (Tianjin), China
- Keqiao (Shaoxing), China

Daejeon

- Bình Dương, Vietnam
- Brisbane, Australia
- Calgary, Canada
- Durban, South Africa
- Guadalajara, Mexico
- Montgomery County, United States
- Nanjing, China
- Novosibirsk, Russia
- Ōda, Japan
- Sapporo, Japan
- Seattle, United States
- Shenyang, China
- Uppsala, Sweden

Daejeon – Jung

- Malabon, Philippines
- Xining, China

Daejeon – Seo

- Khövsgöl, Mongolia
- Wenling, China

Daejeon – Yuseong

- Xigang (Dalian), China

Dangjin

- Rizhao, China
- Snohomish County, United States

Donghae

- Bolu, Turkey
- Federal Way, United States
- Haikou, China
- Jiamusi, China
- Nakhodka, Russia
- Saint John, Canada
- Tsuruga, Japan
- Tumen, China

== G ==
Gangneung

- Algemesí, Spain
- Chichibu, Japan
- Deyang, China
- Irkutsk, Russia
- Jiaxing, China
- Jingzhou, China
- Sorrento, Italy

Gimcheon

- Chengdu, China
- Nanao, Japan
- Subang, Indonesia

Gimhae

- Ayodhya, India
- Biên Hòa, Vietnam
- Çorum, Turkey
- Lakewood, United States
- Munakata, Japan
- Salem, United States
- Wuxi, China

Gimpo

- Glendale, United States
- Heze, China

Goyang

- Eisenstadt, Austria
- Hakodate, Japan
- Heerhugowaard, Netherlands
- Loudoun County, United States
- Maui County, United States
- Qiqihar, China
- San Bernardino, United States

Gunsan

- Jamshedpur, India
- Pimpri-Chinchwad, India
- Tacoma, United States
- Windsor, Canada
- Yantai, China

Guri

- Calamba, Philippines
- Carrollton, United States

Gurye

- Chizhou, China
- Unzen, Japan

Gwacheon

- Burlington, United States
- Nanning, China
- Shirahama, Japan

Gwangju

- Changzhi, China
- Guangzhou, China
- Medan, Indonesia
- Nghệ An, Vietnam
- San Antonio, United States
- Sendai, Japan
- Tainan, Taiwan

Gwangmyeong

- Austin, United States
- Liaocheng, China
- Osnabrück, Germany
- Yamato, Japan

Gyeongju

- Chizhou, China
- Huế, Vietnam
- Nara, Japan
- Nitra, Slovakia
- Obama, Japan
- Ōita Prefecture, Japan
- Pompei, Italy
- Versailles, France
- Xi'an, China

Gyeongsan

- Jōyō, Japan
- Xihai'an (Qingdao), China

== H ==
Hanam

- Little Rock, United States
- Rushan, China
- Shah Alam, Malaysia

Hoengseong

- Kakegawa, Japan
- Linhai, China
- Yazu, Japan

Hongcheon

- Sanary-sur-Mer, France

== I ==
Icheon

- Jingdezhen, China
- Kōka, Japan
- Limoges, France
- Santa Fe, United States
- Seto, Japan

Iksan

- Culver City, United States
- Odense, Denmark
- Zhenjiang, China

Incheon

- Alexandria, Egypt
- Anchorage, United States
- Banten, Indonesia
- Burbank, United States
- Chongqing, China
- Haiphong, Vietnam
- Honolulu, United States
- Kitakyushu, Japan
- Kobe, Japan
- Kolkata, India
- Manila, Philippines
- Mérida, Mexico
- Panama City, Panama
- Philadelphia, United States
- Phnom Penh, Cambodia
- Shenyang, China
- Tel Aviv, Israel
- Ulaanbaatar, Mongolia
- Veneto, Italy
- Vladivostok, Russia
- Yekaterinburg, Russia

Incheon – Gyeyang

- Battambang, Cambodia
- Vũng Tàu, Vietnam
- Yancheng, China

== J ==
Jangheung

- Acheng (Harbin), China
- Bacoor, Philippines
- Changxing, China
- Claver, Philippines
- Haiyan, China
- Washington County, United States

Jecheon

- Hualien, Taiwan
- Pasay, Philippines
- Qichun, China
- Spokane, United States
- Zhangshu, China

Jeju City

- Guilin, China
- Laizhou, China
- Rouen, France
- Sanda, Japan
- Santa Rosa, United States
- Wakayama, Japan

Jeonju

- Antalya, Turkey
- Kanazawa, Japan
- San Diego, United States
- Suzhou, China

Jeongeup

- Xuzhou, China

Jinju

- Eugene, United States
- Kitami, Japan
- Winnipeg, Canada
- Xi'an, China

== M ==
Miryang

- Nanping, China
- Ōmihachiman, Japan
- Yasugi, Japan

Mokpo

- Beppu, Japan
- Hammerfest, Norway
- Lianyungang, China
- Xiamen, China

== N ==
Naju

- Kurayoshi, Japan
- Wenatchee, United States

Namyangju

- Changzhou, China
- Dartford, England, United Kingdom
- Kampong Cham, Cambodia
- Vinh, Vietnam

Nonsan

- Jining, China
- Jinzhou, China
- Langfang, China

== O ==
Osan

- Hidaka, Japan
- Killeen, United States
- Quảng Nam, Vietnam

== P ==
Paju

- Coquitlam, Canada
- Cuenca, Spain
- Eskişehir, Turkey
- Hadano, Japan
- Jinzhou, China
- Mudanjiang, China
- Rancagua, Chile
- Sasebo, Japan
- Stellenbosch, South Africa
- Toowoomba, Australia

Pohang

- Fukuyama, Japan
- Hunchun, China
- İzmit, Turkey
- Jōetsu, Japan
- Pittsburg, United States
- Vladivostok, Russia

Pyeongtaek

- Aomori, Japan
- Irpin, Ukraine
- Mobile, United States
- Rizhao, China

== S ==
Samcheok

- Akabira, Japan
- Dongying, China
- Jixi, China
- Kanda, Japan
- Korsakov, Russia
- Kungur, Russia
- Kurobe, Japan
- Leesburg, United States
- Mareeba, Australia
- Wangqing, China

Sejong has no sister cities.

Seogwipo

- Hangzhou, China
- Kashima, Japan
- Kinokawa, Japan
- Salinas, United States
- Xingcheng, China

Seongnam

- Aurora, United States
- Piracicaba, Brazil
- Shenyang, China

Seoul

- Ankara, Turkey
- Astana, Kazakhstan
- Athens, Greece
- Bangkok, Thailand
- Beijing, China
- Bogotá, Colombia
- Cairo, Egypt
- Hanoi, Vietnam
- Honolulu, United States
- Jakarta, Indonesia
- Mexico City, Mexico
- Moscow, Russia
- New South Wales, Australia
- New York City, United States
- San Francisco, United States
- São Paulo, Brazil
- Taipei, Taiwan
- Tashkent, Uzbekistan
- Tokyo, Japan
- Ulaanbaatar, Mongolia
- Warsaw, Poland
- Washington, D.C., United States

Seoul – Dobong

- Changping (Beijing), China

Seoul – Eunpyeong

- Canterbury, Australia

Seoul – Gangdong

- Fengtai (Beijing), China
- Musashino, Japan
- Qinhuangdao, China
- Segovia, Spain
- Songino Khairkhan (Ulaanbaatar), Mongolia
- Tangshan, China
- Willoughby, Australia

Seoul – Gangnam

- Chaoyang (Beijing), China
- Grand Rapids, United States
- Gwinnett County, United States
- Licheng (Jinan), China
- Riverside, United States
- Woluwe-Saint-Pierre, Belgium
- Zhongshan (Dalian), China

Seoul – Gangseo

- Changning (Shanghai), China
- Otaru, Japan
- Penrith, Australia
- Tarlac City, Philippines
- Zhaoyuan, China

Seoul – Gwanak

- Daxing (Beijing), China
- Hohhot, China
- Kingston upon Thames, England, United Kingdom
- Tiexi (Shenyang), China
- Yanji, China

Seoul – Gwangjin

- Ereğli, Turkey
- Khan Uul (Ulaanbaatar), Mongolia

Seoul – Jongno

- Prague 1 (Prague), Czech Republic

Seoul – Jungnang

- Dongcheng (Beijing), China
- Kazanlak, Bulgaria
- Meguro (Tokyo), Japan

Seoul – Mapo

- Katsushika (Tokyo), Japan
- Shijingshan (Beijing), China

Seoul – Seocho

- Cuauhtémoc (Mexico City), Mexico
- Irvine, United States
- Laoshan (Qingdao), China
- Manhattan (New York), United States
- Perth, Australia
- Şişli, Turkey
- South-Western AO (Moscow), Russia
- Suginami (Tokyo), Japan

Seoul – Songpa

- Asunción, Paraguay
- Chaoyang (Beijing), China
- Chingeltei (Ulaanbaatar), Mongolia
- Christchurch, New Zealand
- Fairfax County, United States
- Karaganda, Kazakhstan
- Minhang (Shanghai), China
- Panyu (Guangzhou), China
- Steglitz-Zehlendorf (Berlin), Germany
- Tonghua, China

Seoul – Yangcheon

- Bankstown, Australia
- Chaoyang (Changchun), China
- Nakano (Tokyo), Japan

Seoul – Yeongdeungpo

- Kishiwada, Japan
- Mentougou (Beijing), China
- Monterey Park, United States

Sinan

- Granbury, United States

Suncheon

- Antalya, Turkey
- Columbia, United States
- Izumi, Japan
- Kragujevac, Serbia
- Nantes, France
- Taiyuan, China

Suwon

- Asahikawa, Japan
- Bandung, Indonesia
- Cluj-Napoca, Romania
- Curitiba, Brazil
- Fez, Morocco
- Freiburg im Breisgau, Germany
- Hải Dương, Vietnam
- Jinan, China
- Nizhny Novgorod, Russia
- Siem Reap, Cambodia
- Toluca, Mexico
- Townsville, Australia
- Yalova, Turkey

== T ==
Tongyeong

- Reedley, United States
- Rongcheng, China
- Samara, Russia
- Sayama, Japan
- Tamano, Japan
- Yunfu, China

== U ==
Uiwang

- Kimitsu, Japan
- North Little Rock, United States
- Xianning, China

Ulsan

- Burgas, Bulgaria
- Changchun, China
- Hagi, Japan
- Houston, United States
- Hualien, Taiwan
- Khánh Hòa, Vietnam
- Kocaeli, Turkey
- Portland, United States
- Santos, Brazil
- Tomsk, Russia
- Wuxi, China

== W ==
Wando

- Imari, Japan
- Lianyun (Lianyungang), China
- Rongcheng, China

Wonju

- Edmonton, Canada
- Hefei, China
- Roanoke, United States

== Y ==
Yanggu

- Chizu, Japan
- Jianli, China
- Saint-Mandé, France

Yangju

- Dongying, China
- Fujieda, Japan
- Henrico County, United States

Yangyang

- Daisen, Japan
- Rokkasho, Japan
- Xiangzhou (Xiangyang), China

Yeoju

- Kamimine, Japan
- Tsunan, Japan

Yeongam

- Hirakata, Japan
- Huzhou, China

Yeongcheon

- Kaifeng, China
- Kuroishi, Japan

Yeongju

- Bozhou, China
- Fujinomiya, Japan
- Jining, China
- Nantou, Taiwan
- Shaoguan, China

Yesan

- Knoxville, United States

Yongin

- Ajman, United Arab Emirates
- Fergana Region, Uzbekistan
- Fullerton, United States
- Kayseri, Turkey
- Kota Kinabalu, Malaysia
- Williamson County, United States
- Yangzhou, China
