= Hai Prefecture =

Historical administrative division in Jiangsu, China

Haizhou or Hai Prefecture (海州) was a zhou (prefecture) in imperial China seated in modern Lianyungang, Jiangsu, China. It existed (intermittently) from 549 to 1912.

During the Yuan dynasty it was briefly named Haizhou Route (海州路).

The modern Haizhou District in Lianyungang City retains its name.

== Geography ==
The administrative region of Haizhou in the Tang dynasty is in modern Jiangsu. It probably includes parts of modern:

- Under the administration of Lianyungang:
  - Lianyungang
  - Donghai County
  - Guanyun County
- Under the administration of Suqian:
  - Shuyang County
