= Mount Huaguo (Jiangsu) =

Mountain in Jiangsu, China

Coordinates: 34.654107°N 119.288335°E

Mount Huaguo (Chinese: 花果山; pinyin: Huāguǒ Shān) is a mountain located in Haizhou District, Lianyungang, Jiangsu, China. It forms a part of the Yuntai Mountains (Chinese: 云台山). The site is best known for being an inspiration for a synonymous legendary mountain in the novel Journey to the West. Its summit, Yunü Peak (Chinese: 玉女峰; pinyin: Yùnǚ Fēng), is the highest point of Jiangsu province at 625.3 metres (2,052 ft).

== Location ==
Mount Huaguo is located in Haizhou District, 7 kilometers southeast of the center of Lianyungang. It covers an area of 84.3 square kilometers, with 136 peaks. The area is a popular tourist attraction as a result of its appearance in the novel Journey to the West.

== Tourism ==
Mount Huaguo is a popular tourist attraction, especially because of the novel Journey to the West. It has over 100 scenic spots and thousands of visitors every year. The mountain has many statues based on its heroes, such as a sculpture of the head of Sun Wukong (the Monkey King), a protagonist of the novel. Near the entrance stand sculptures of the four main characters, along with 109 stone monkeys welcoming visitors as they enter and six stone lions guarding the mountain. Other attractions related to Sun Wukong include the Monkey Stone, Water Curtain Cave, Sanyuan Temple, Yunü Peak, South Gate of Heaven, etc.

=== Monkey Stone ===
The "Monkey Stone" resembles a monkey from a distance. Because of this, people relate the stone with the Sun Wukong (the Monkey King), who rules and protects his home as a protector deity of the mountain.

=== Water Curtain Cave ===
Water Curtain Cave, or Shuilian Cave (simplified Chinese: 水帘洞; traditional Chinese: 水簾洞; pinyin: Shuǐlián Dòng; Wade–Giles: Shui^{3}lien^{2}tung^{4}), is a natural waterfall over a cave formed by a ground fissure. There are ancient carvings in front of the cave, with letters written by emperors from different dynasties. For example, "印心石屋" was written by the Daoguang Emperor during the Qing dynasty. Inside, there are tunnels leading to a platform. A small spring inside, called Lingquan Spring, is always full of water, even when in times of drought. It is said that the spring can lead visitors to the Dragon King's Palace.

=== Sanyuan Temple ===
Sanyuan Temple is the biggest building in Mount Huaguo, and one of the most ancient. It was initially built during the Tang dynasty. It contains three statues that represent the three gods of Heaven, Earth, and Water.
