= Mount Huaguo =

Area featured in the novel Journey to the West

Coordinates: 34.654107°N 119.288335°E

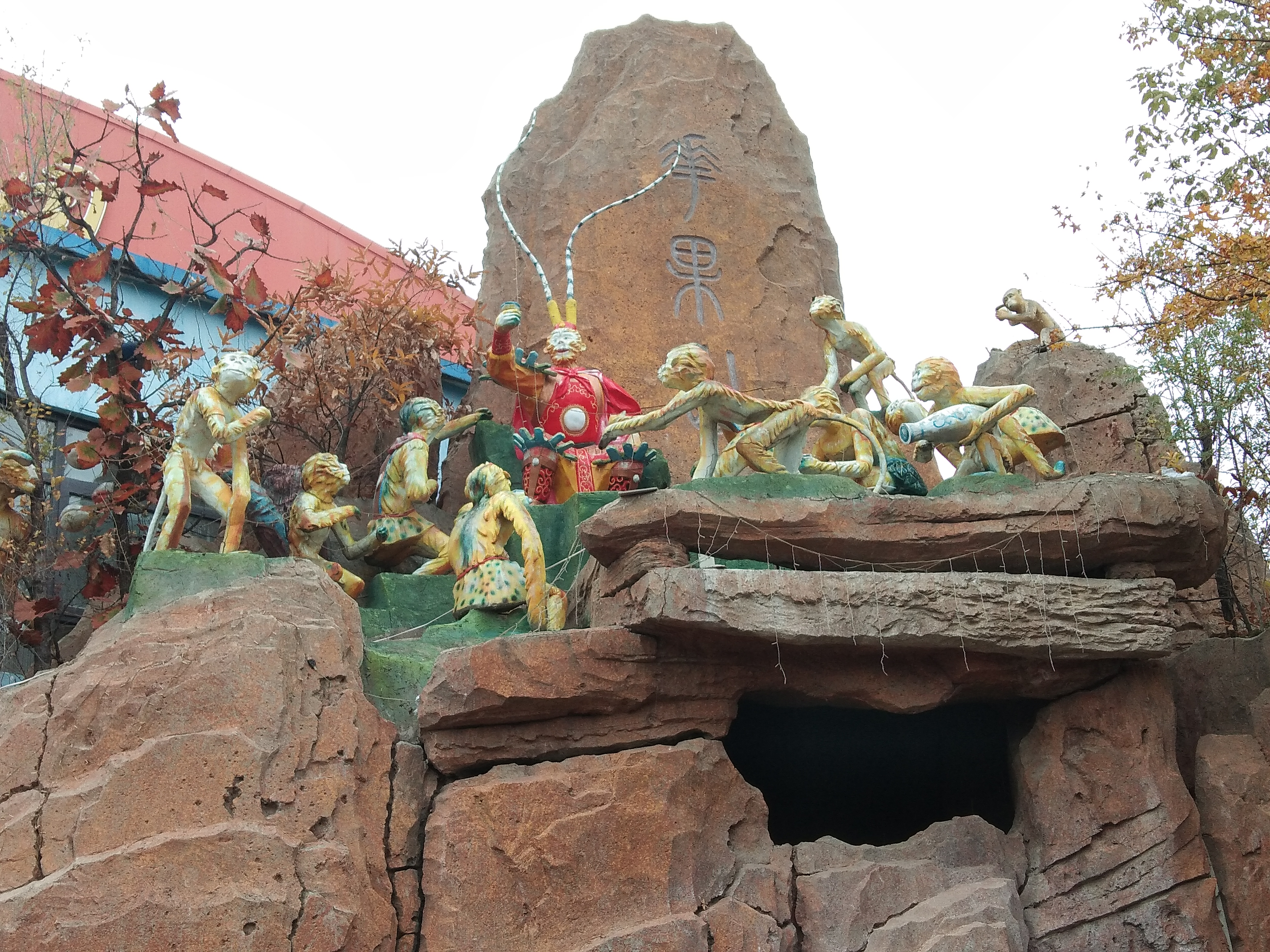
Model of Sun Wukong's homeland on Mount Huaguo, at Mount Huaguo (Jiangsu).

Mount Huaguo (traditional Chinese: 花果山; pinyin: Huāguǒ Shān; Wade–Giles: Hua^{1}kuo^{3} Shan^{1}; Japanese: Kakazan; Vietnamese: Hoa Quả Sơn), or Flowers and Fruit Mountain, is a major area featured in the novel Journey to the West (16th century). A number of real-world locations have been connected with the Mount Huaguo, although the eponymous mountain in Lianyungang, Jiangsu is most commonly identified as its source of inspiration.

According to folklore, when Guanyin Bodhisattva passed through Flower Fruit Mountain, she meditated on a large rock. Imbued with divine essence, the stone miraculously gave birth to Sun Wukong. In a folktale, the mother goddess Nüwa sacrificed herself, transforming into thousands of colorful crystals to repair the sky. One of these crystals fell onto Flower and Fruit Mountain, where it absorbed the essence of the sun and moon, eventually giving birth to a stone monkey.

== Description ==
In the novel, this mountain is located in the country of Aolai (傲來) in the Eastern Continent of Superior Deity (simplified Chinese: 东胜神州; traditional Chinese: 東勝神州; pinyin: Dōng Shèngshenzhōu; Wade–Giles: Tung^{1}Sheng^{4}shen^{1}Chou^{1}), also known in Anthony C. Yu's translation as the "Pūrvavideha Continent". It is known as the birthplace of Sun Wukong, the main protagonist of Journey to the West. The large mountain has many demons and monkeys in its population and contains many hidden areas, such as the Shuilian Cave. After Sun Wukong bravely rushes through a large waterfall and into this cave, every individual in the mountain acknowledges him as their king.

After Sun Wukong becomes "Handsome Monkey King" (美猴王; měi hóuwáng), this mountain becomes exceedingly civilized and well-trained for various future conflicts, such as war. This can be seen in the fact that Sun Wukong often left this mountain for various reasons, including his eventual task of protecting Tang Sanzang on his journey to India. Due to the natural and civilized ways of this mountain set by Sun Wukong, this mountain continues to thrive even after 500 years of conflict.

A "Water Curtain Cave" or "Shuilian Cave" is featured within the novel Journey to the West, written in the Ming Dynasty. Very early on, Sun Wukong becomes the king of this cave, and it is generally used for all the monkeys to train within and generally rest. Before such an event, Wukong, with his bravery, nominated himself to be the monkey that would rush through the Mount Huaguo's great waterfall in order to see what was behind it. He discovered

Emerald moss piled up in heaps of blue,
White clouds like drifting jade,
While the light flickered among wisps of coloured mist.
A quiet house with peaceful windows,
Flowers growing on the smooth bench;
Dragon pearls hanging in niches,
Exotic blooms all around.
Traces of fire beside the stove,
Scraps of food in the vessels by the table.
Adorable stone chairs and beds,
Even better stone plates and bowls.
One or two tall bamboos,
Three or four sprigs of plum blossom,
A few pines that always attract rain,
All just like a real home.

Following this, Wukong

took a good, long look and then scampered to the middle of the bridge, from where he noticed a stone tablet. On the tablet had been carved in big square letters: HAPPY LAND OF THE MOUNTAIN OF FLOWERS AND FRUIT, CAVE HEAVEN OF THE WATER CURTAIN (花果山福地、水帘洞洞天). The stone monkey was beside himself with glee. He rushed away, shut his eyes, crouched, and leapt back through the waterfall.

After many points following this, Sun Wukong returned to the Water Curtain Cave for miscellaneous reasons, either while returning from his celestial master, or because of an issue with his enlightened master, Sanzang.

== Prototype ==
The subject has been widely discussed by scholars, and several real-world mountains have been named as "real" Flower Fruit Mountain, becoming popular tourist attractions in China. There is no consensus among Chinese academics regarding the true prototype of Flower Fruit Mountain.

- Huaguoshan in Lianyungang, Jiangsu: In the first Journey to the West academic symposium in 1982, many experts agreed that Huaguoshan in Lianyungang is the "hometown of Sun Wukong". Today, Huaguoshan in Lianyungang has developed into a tourist attraction.
- Huaguoshan in Loufan, Shanxi: After over two decades of research, scholars such as Meng Fanren, Li Guocheng, and Professor Li Angang, president of the China Journey to the West Culture Research Committee, have concluded that Huaguoshan in Loufan is the prototype of the legendary Huaguoshan. Local records indicate that there were already temples dedicated to the Monkey King in the area before the novel Journey to the West was written.
- Baoshan Mountain in Shunchang, Fujian: Wang Yimin, a curator of the Shunchang County Museum in Fujian Province, has proposed that the "birthplace of Sun Wukong" is Baoshan Mountain. The main evidence for this claim is the discovery of a joint tomb of Sun Wukong and his brothers dating back to the late Yuan and early Ming dynasties. Additionally, many landscapes in Baoshan that resemble those described in Journey to the West have been found, such as the fairy-patterned Stone and Gaojia Village.
- Mount Tai in Shandong: In 2006, scholar Du Guichen, after extensive research, proposed that Mount Tai in Shandong Province is the prototype of Huaguoshan. His argument is primarily based on the discovery of several landmarks in the area, such as Aolai Peak and the Sun-drying Sutra Stone, which predate the Ming Dynasty and correspond to place names mentioned in Journey to the West.
- Huaguoshan in Yiyang, Luoyang, Henan: In 2008, several experts noted that the name "Huaguoshan" in Yiyang first appeared in the Northern Song Dynasty's Taiping Huanyu Ji, predating the Ming Dynasty novel Journey to the West. Due to its proximity to Yanshi County, the hometown of Xuanzang, these scholars argue that Yiyang's Huaguoshan is the most likely prototype for the legendary Huaguoshan.
- Yangxian Mountain in Yixing, Jiangsu: In 2009, Xing Huiling, a researcher at Henan University, proposed that Yangxian Mountain in Yixing is the prototype of Huaguoshan. Shi Guoxing, the chief editor of the local gazetteers for Shanzhuan and Taihua Towns in Yixing, provided multiple pieces of evidence to support this claim.
- Siming Mountain in Ningbo, Zhejiang: Scholar Fang Dong has proposed that Siming Mountain in Ningbo is likely the prototype of Huaguoshan based on the striking similarities between the geographical features of Siming Mountain and the descriptions of Huaguoshan in Journey to the West. He also points out that the name "Chanyuan Cave" in Siming Mountain closely resembles the "Water Curtain Cave" in Huaguoshan.
