= Lianyungang Huaguoshan International Airport =

Commercial airport serving Lianyungang, Jiangsu, China

Lianyungang Huaguoshan International Airport 连云港花果山国际机场
- IATA: LYG; ICAO: ZSLG

Summary
- Airport type: Public
- Serves: Lianyungang
- Location: Xiaoyi Town, Guanyun County, Lianyungang, Jiangsu, China
- Opened: 2 December 2021; 4 years ago
- Coordinates: 34°24′47″N 119°10′38″E

Map
- Location in Jiangsu LYG/ZSLG (China)

Runways
Direction	Length		Surface
Direction	m	ft	Surface
03/21	2,800	9,186

Statistics (2025)
- Passengers: 1,746,839
- Aircraft movements: 16,764
- Cargo (metric tons): 3,086.4

Lianyungang Huaguoshan International Airport
- Simplified Chinese: 连云港花果山国际机场
- Traditional Chinese: 連雲港花果山國際機場
Transcriptions
Standard Mandarin
- Hanyu Pinyin: Liányúngǎng Huāguǒshān Guójì Jīchǎng

Lianyungang Huaguoshan International Airport (IATA: LYG, ICAO: ZSLG) is an airport serving the city of Lianyungang in East China's Jiangsu province. Opened on 2 December 2021, it is Lianyungang's main airport, with the existing dual-use Lianyungang Baitabu Airport becoming a dedicated military air base.

Huaguoshan Airport is located in Xiaoyi Town, Guanyun County, about 21.5 kilometres (13.4 mi) from the city center of Lianyungang. It is named after Mount Huaguo (Huaguoshan), a major tourist attraction in Lianyungang.

The airport has a runway that is 2,800 metres (9,200 ft) long and 45 metres (148 ft) wide (class 4D). It is projected to handle 2.5 million passengers and 20,000 tons of cargo after completion. The passenger movements of the Airport in 2023 were 1,447,802, making it the 87th busiest airport in China.

== History ==
On September 8, 2008, Lianyungang City officially proposed the site selection for the new airport. On February 6, 2010, the State Council Information Office website published the full text of the detailed rules for the development plan of the coastal areas of Jiangsu Province. Section 2 mentioned that "the Lianyungang Baitabu Airport will be expanded and upgraded to a national first-class open port. A new airport will be planned and relocated according to development needs, and the military and civilian facilities will be separated."

Two years later, in 2012, after research by the local municipal party committee and government, it was decided to relocate the Lianyungang civilian airport. In July 2014, the Civil Aviation Administration of China approved the project site selection. According to a notice issued by the Lianyungang Municipal People's Government on September 23, 2014, the relocation site for Lianyungang Airport is located in Xiaoyi Township, Guanyun County. The center of the airport runway is 22 kilometers in a straight line from the city center, approximately 20 kilometers from Tongxing Town to the east, approximately 8 kilometers from Longju Town to the west, and approximately 14 kilometers from Yishan Town, the county seat, to the south. The initial coordinates of the runway reference point are 119 degrees 10 minutes 38 seconds east longitude and 34 degrees 24 minutes 47 seconds north latitude. The initial true azimuth of the runway is 27 degrees–207 degrees (magnetic deviation 5 degrees W), and the initial elevation of the reference point is 4 meters.

Preliminary preparations were completed in the first half of 2017, which was then approved by the State Council and the Central Military Commission. During the construction period, the external signage of the site read "Huaguoshan International Airport." However, in accordance with the regulations of the Ministry of Transport and the Civil Aviation Administration of China, specifically Article 42 of the "Regulations on the Licensing of Transport Airports" (Ministry of Transport Order No. 14 of 2018), the new Lianyungang Airport was named "Lianyungang Huaguoshan Airport." The name will be changed to "Lianyungang Huaguoshan International Airport" after the new airport passes the port opening inspection.

On March 18, 2020, with the pouring of the last batch of concrete, the main structure of the terminal building of Lianyungang Huaguoshan International Airport was successfully capped. The terminal building, which has now been structurally completed, is 300 meters long and 67.8 meters wide, with one underground floor and two above-ground floors. Each floor has a 7.95-meter-high slab and a single-story building area of 14,000 square meters. It is an ultra-long reinforced concrete structure, completed in 11 pours. From the formation of the project management team and the commencement of construction to the capping of the main structure, only seven and a half months were completed. On February 9, 2021, with the completion of the final concrete pour, the runway and taxiway of Lianyungang Huaguoshan Airport were fully completed.

At 0:00 on December 2, 2021, Lianyungang Huaguoshan Airport officially opened for operation, and Lianyungang Baitabu Airport was closed at the same time. The second phase expansion project of Huaguoshan Airport was also launched at the same time.

On August 7, 2024, the Civil Aviation Administration of China approved the renaming of Lianyungang Huaguoshan Airport to "Lianyungang Huaguoshan International Airport". On December 3, 2024, Lianyungang Huaguoshan International Airport held a grand ceremony to mark the inaugural flight of its international route. At 12:44, flight AQ1230 from Suvarnabhumi Airport in Thailand landed smoothly at Lianyungang Huaguoshan International Airport and received the highest honor of passing through a water salute, marking the successful maiden flight of the international route at Lianyungang Huaguoshan International Airport.

== Airlines and destinations ==
Airlines	Destinations
9 Air	Changchun, Guangzhou
Air China	Beijing–Capital, Chengdu–Tianfu
China Eastern Airlines	Changchun, Dalian, Kunming, Nanchang, Tianjin
China Express Airlines	Chongqing, Ningbo, Wuhan, Zhoushan
China Southern Airlines	Guangzhou, Jieyang, Urumqi
Colorful Guizhou Airlines	Guiyang, Shenyang
Donghai Airlines	Dalian, Shenzhen
GX Airlines	Haikou, Zhuhai
Hainan Airlines	Lanzhou, Shijiazhuang
Shenzhen Airlines	Nanning, Quanzhou
Sichuan Airlines	Kunming
Tianjin Airlines	Dalian
XiamenAir	Changsha, Harbin, Ordos, Xiamen
