= Chen Qinggang =

Chinese journalist

Chen Qinggang (Chinese: 陈庆港; born June 1966) is a Chinese journalist who served as the bureau chief of Hangzhou Daily News. He took many photographs mainly about people's livelihood.

== Biography ==
Chen was born in Lianyungang, Jiangsu province in 1966.

== Education ==
He graduated from the Nanjing University of Arts and worked for several newspapers.

== Representative works ==
"Investigation on situation of poor families in China in the late 20th century", "Investigation on bacteriological warfare". He won the International press photography competition gold medal in 2005 by the work "The Survived Comfort Women in China". And also won the medal in 2007 by the work "Gray space – depression".

=== Greatest credit ===
He won the Lotus racing award in 2010 by "14 : China farmers' survival report". He lived with poor farmers in northwestern China to record their lives and took photos of them. He finally wrote a book which accurately reflects farmer's poor lives. The book has become one of the most popular books in 2011.
