= Lian Island =

Island in Jiangsu, China

Coordinates: 34°45′27″N 119°27′50″E

Native name: 连岛
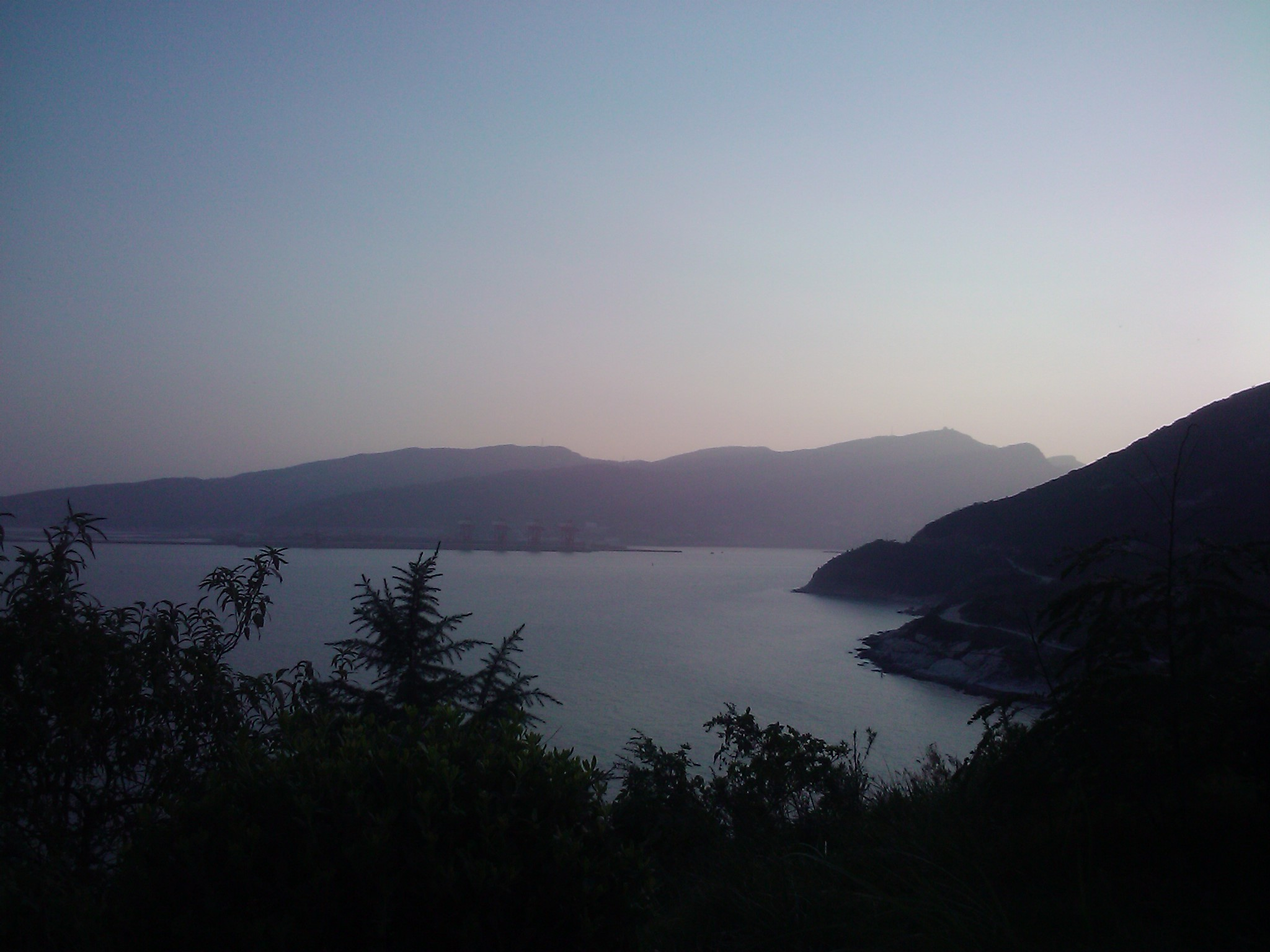
- Lian Island at sunset

- Location within China

Geography
- Area: 7.57 km^{2} (2.92 sq mi)

Administration
- China
- Province: Jiangsu
- City: Lianyungang

Lian Island (Chinese: 连岛; pinyin: lián dǎo) is the largest island in Lianyun District, Lianyungang, Jiangsu, China. The island is located inside Haizhou Bay in the Yellow Sea. It is 9 km (5.6 mi) long from east to west across the island and it has an area of 7.57 km^{2} (2.92 sq mi). 80% of the island is covered with forests. The longest sea dyke nationally (6.7 km or 4.2 mi long) connects the island with the east of the city of Lianyungang. Lian Island is the only AAAA-class seashore tourist attraction in Jiangsu. The island was formerly known as Yingyou hill.

== Climate ==
Lian Island is on the southern edge of the temperate zone, which results in its subtropical monsoon maritime climate. With distinct seasons and pleasant weather, climates here are humid due to the influence of the sea. The average annual temperature is 14 °C (57.2 Degrees Fahrenheit) with the highest average temperature in August at 26.8 °C (80.24 Degrees Fahrenheit) and the lowest in January at 1.1 °C. (33.98 Degrees Fahrenheit)

Throughout the year, there are approximately 223 days having an average temperature of 10 °C or even higher and an average rainfall of 882.6 mm.

Climate data for Lian Island (1991–2020 normals, extremes 1981–present)
Month	Jan	Feb	Mar	Apr	May	Jun	Jul	Aug	Sep	Oct	Nov	Dec	Year
Record high °C (°F)	13.6 (56.5)	22.8 (73.0)	24.9 (76.8)	31.9 (89.4)	35.5 (95.9)	35.9 (96.6)	39.5 (103.1)	36.5 (97.7)	33.7 (92.7)	29.3 (84.7)	25.1 (77.2)	19.4 (66.9)	39.5 (103.1)
Mean daily maximum °C (°F)	4.4 (39.9)	6.5 (43.7)	11.5 (52.7)	17.9 (64.2)	23.3 (73.9)	26.2 (79.2)	29.2 (84.6)	29.0 (84.2)	25.7 (78.3)	20.7 (69.3)	13.8 (56.8)	7.1 (44.8)	17.9 (64.3)
Daily mean °C (°F)	1.9 (35.4)	3.6 (38.5)	8.0 (46.4)	13.9 (57.0)	19.5 (67.1)	23.1 (73.6)	26.6 (79.9)	26.7 (80.1)	23.4 (74.1)	18.1 (64.6)	11.3 (52.3)	4.6 (40.3)	15.1 (59.1)
Mean daily minimum °C (°F)	−0.1 (31.8)	1.4 (34.5)	5.3 (41.5)	10.9 (51.6)	16.5 (61.7)	20.7 (69.3)	24.4 (75.9)	24.7 (76.5)	21.3 (70.3)	15.9 (60.6)	9.0 (48.2)	2.5 (36.5)	12.7 (54.9)
Record low °C (°F)	−13.3 (8.1)	−8.3 (17.1)	−5.2 (22.6)	0.7 (33.3)	8.7 (47.7)	13.5 (56.3)	17.7 (63.9)	15.8 (60.4)	14.0 (57.2)	4.3 (39.7)	−4.7 (23.5)	−9.6 (14.7)	−13.3 (8.1)
Average precipitation mm (inches)	20.9 (0.82)	24.9 (0.98)	34.1 (1.34)	43.1 (1.70)	70.2 (2.76)	97.0 (3.82)	235.1 (9.26)	188.4 (7.42)	90.2 (3.55)	36.9 (1.45)	40.3 (1.59)	21.6 (0.85)	902.7 (35.54)
Average precipitation days (≥ 0.1 mm)	4.6	5.3	5.8	6.7	8.0	7.5	13.0	11.4	7.5	5.1	5.7	4.2	84.8
Average snowy days	2.6	2.3	0.8	0.1	0	0	0	0	0	0	0.3	1.0	7.1
Average relative humidity (%)	64	66	65	65	68	77	81	80	71	64	64	63	69
Mean monthly sunshine hours	157.5	157.3	199.7	217.5	233.9	199.9	196.4	206.1	198.7	198.8	162.9	159.5	2,288.2
Percentage possible sunshine	50	51	54	55	54	46	45	50	54	57	53	52	52
Source: China Meteorological Administration all-time extreme temperature

== Places of interest ==
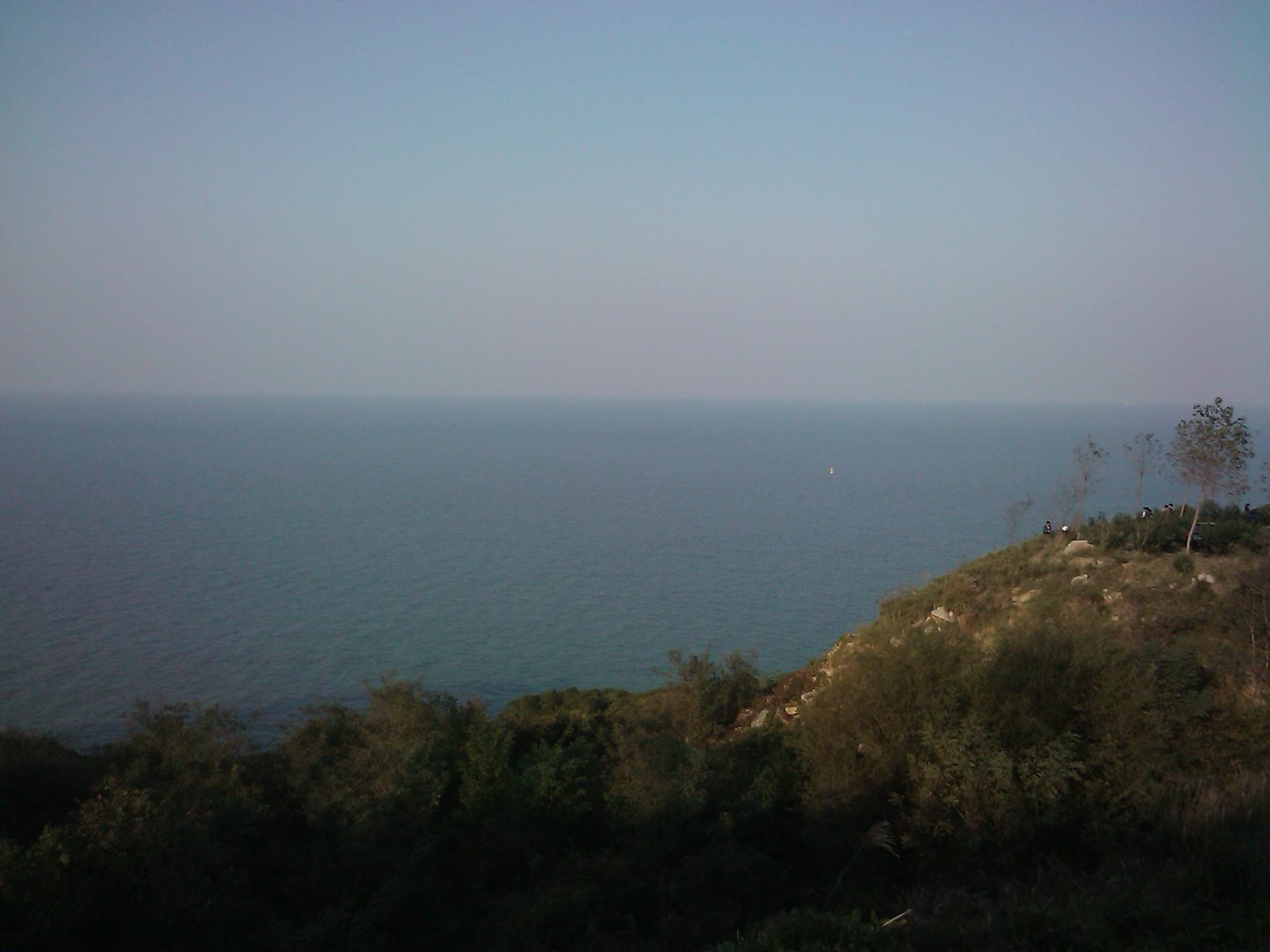

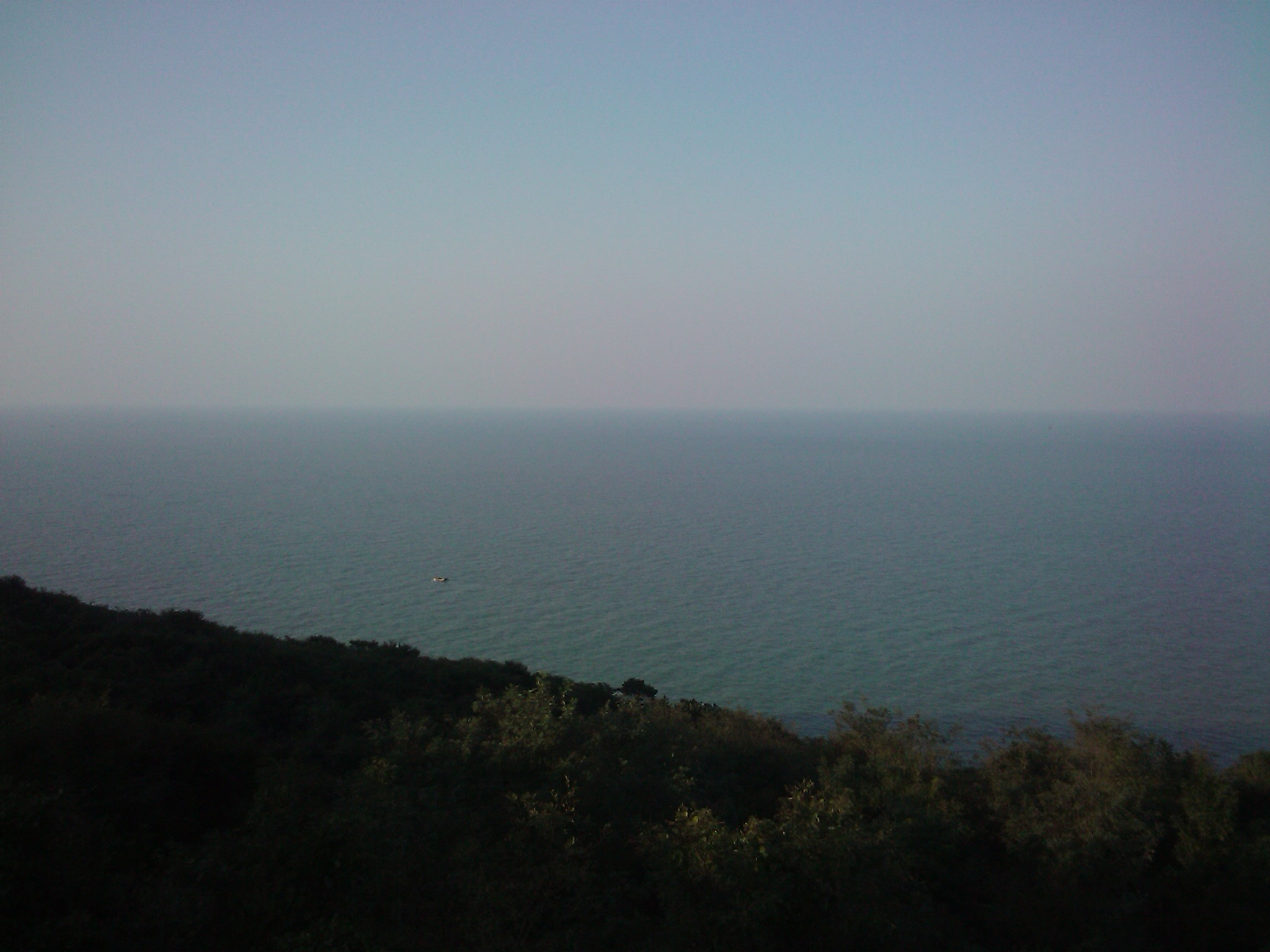

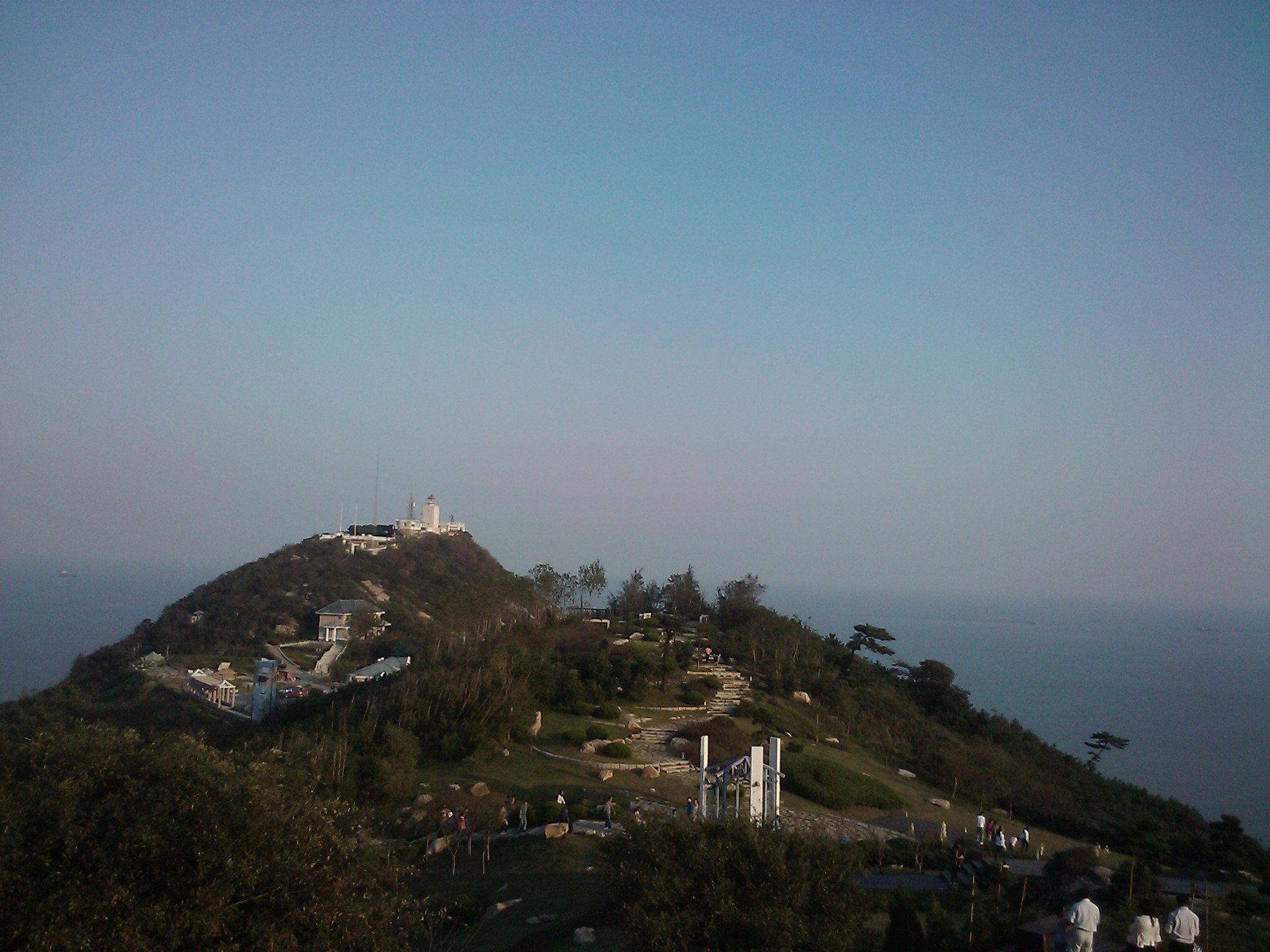

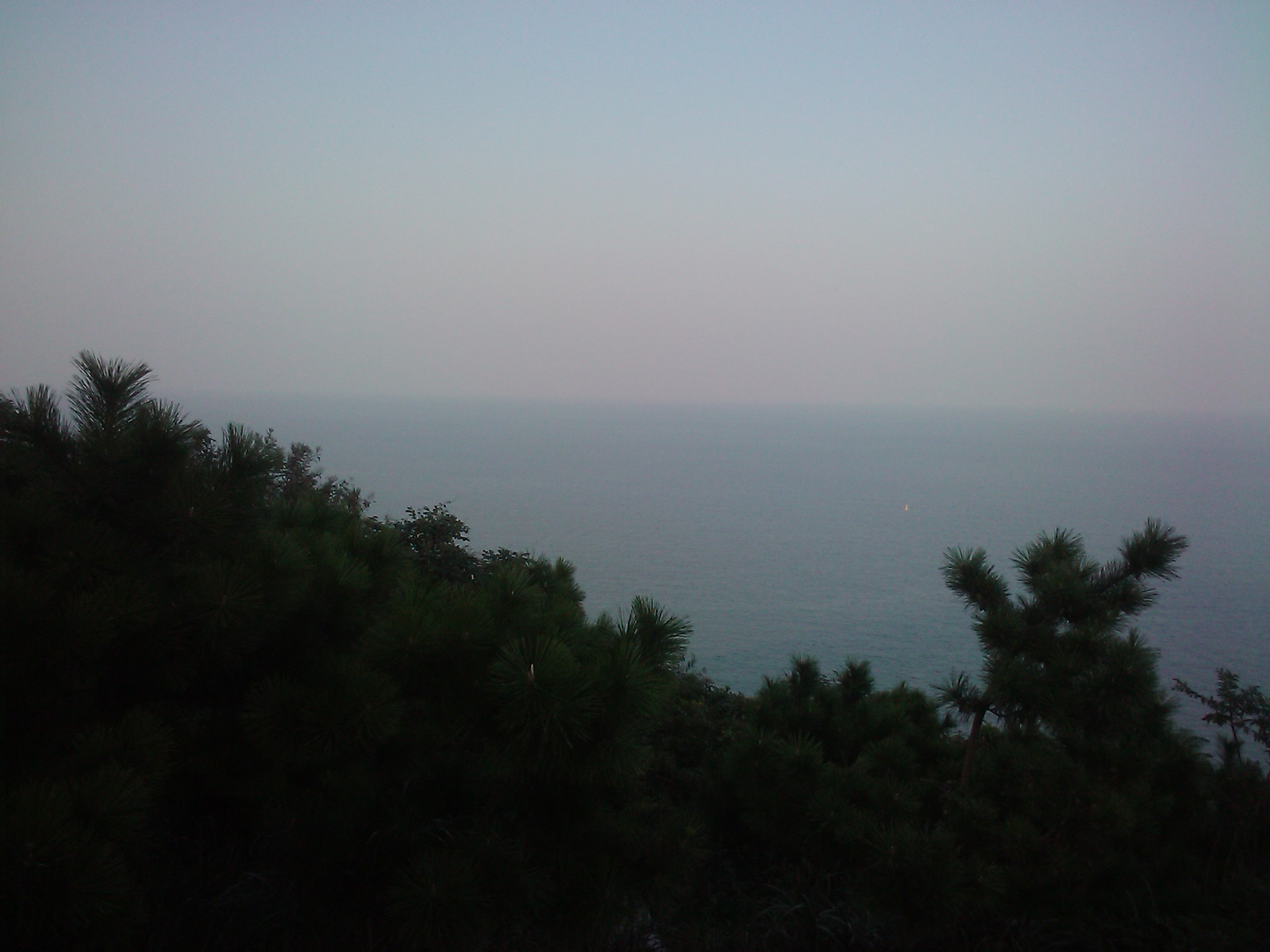

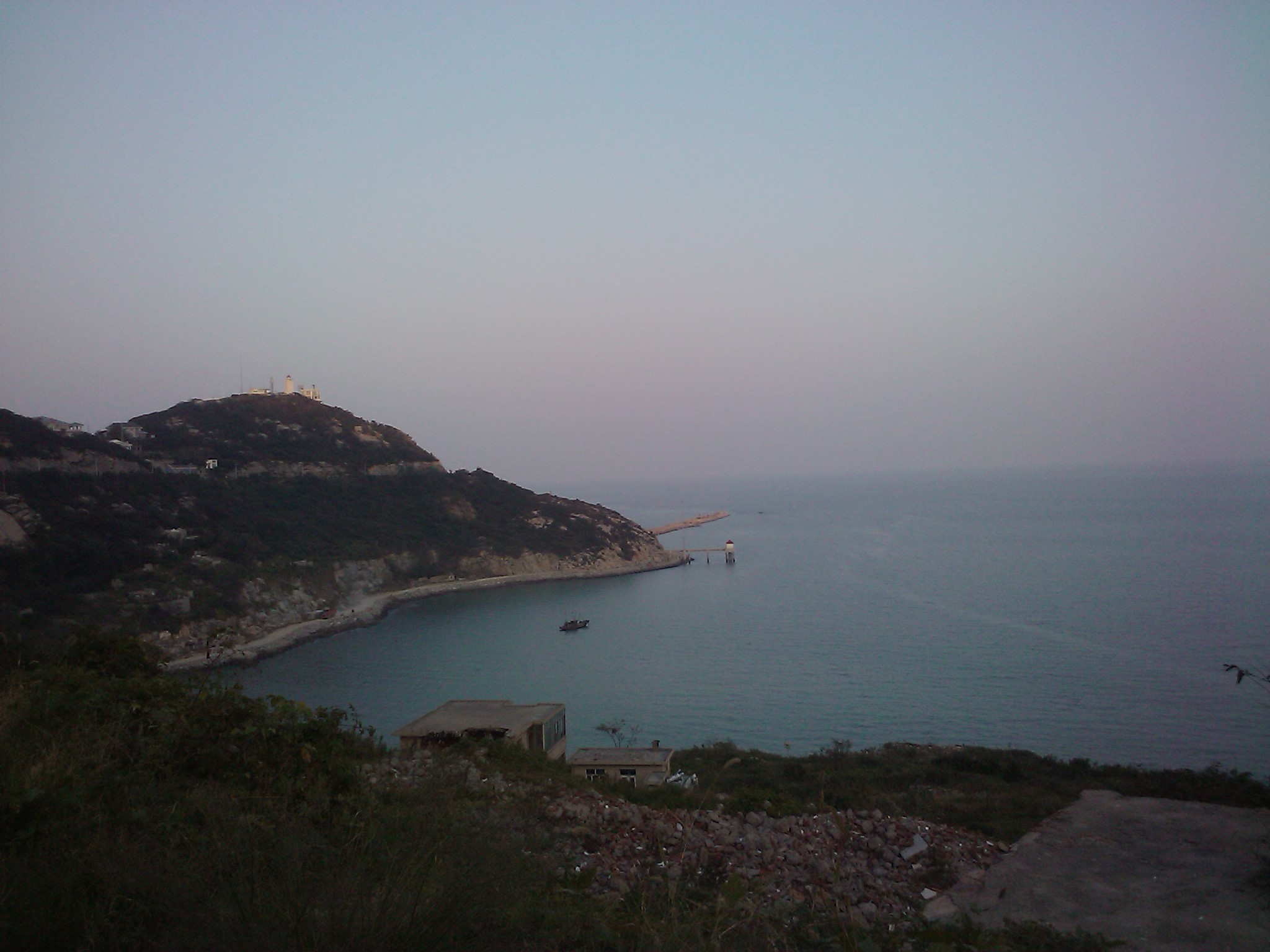

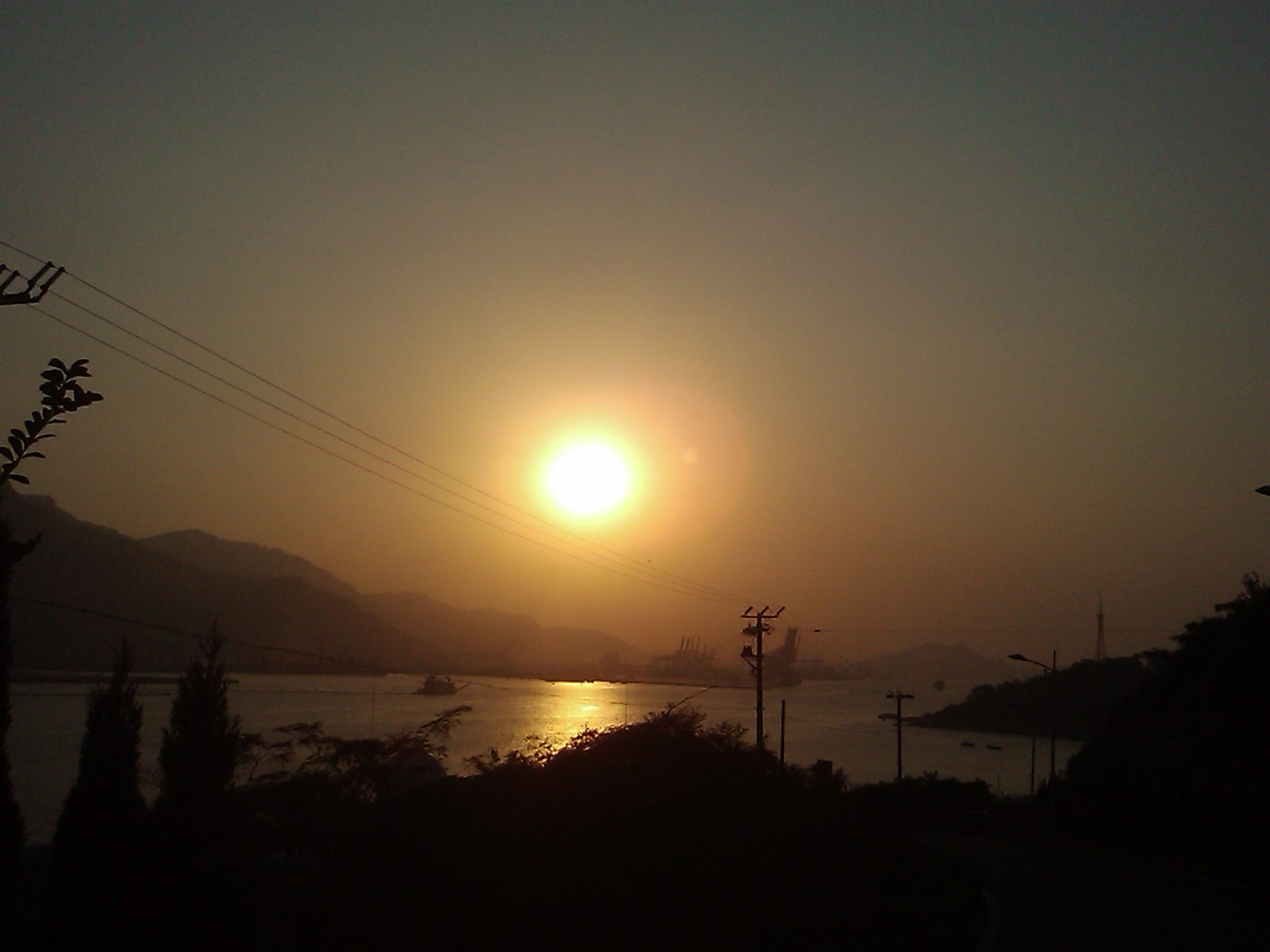

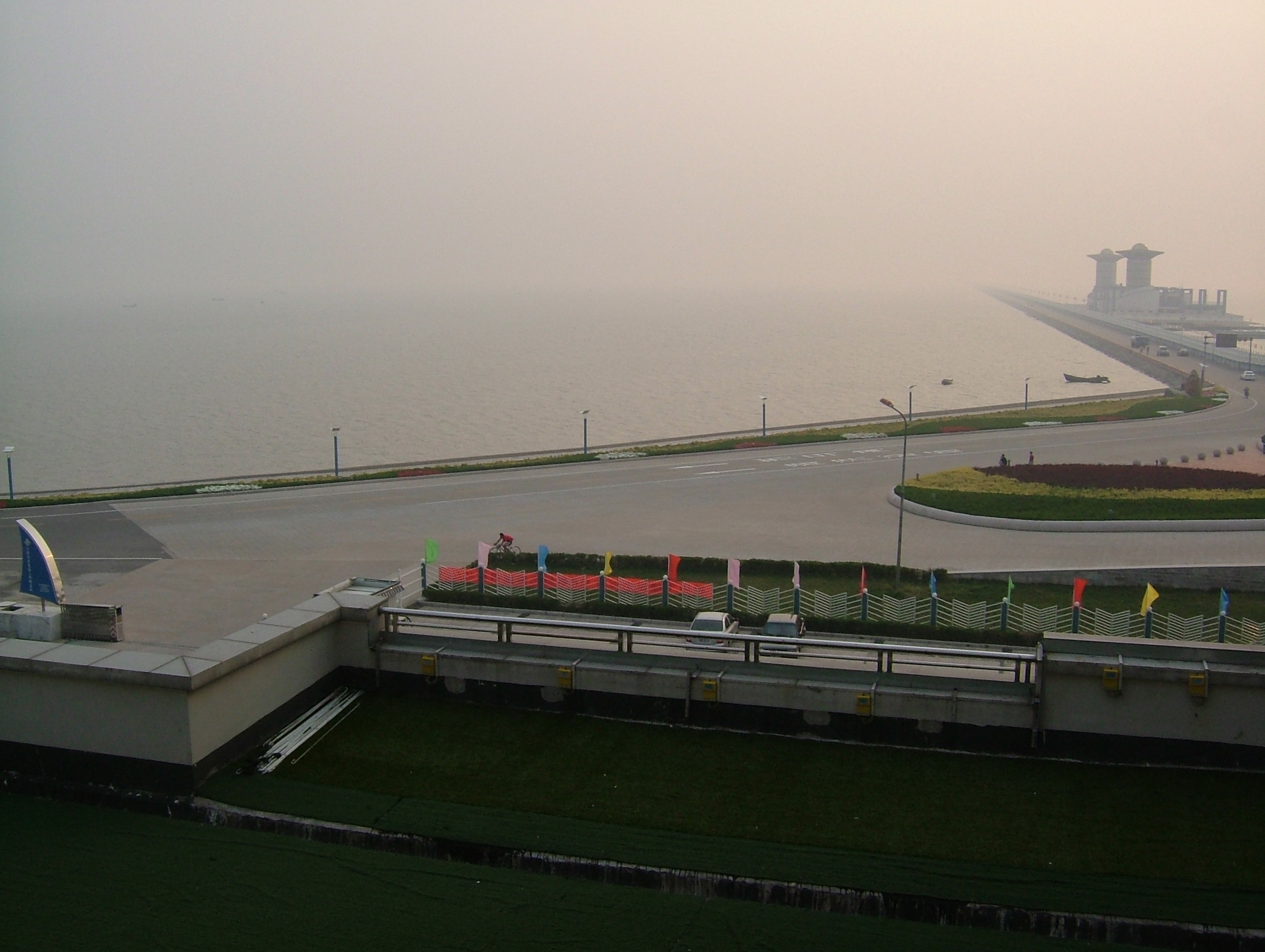
The longest sea dyke in China

=== Dashawan ===
Dashawan (大沙湾), a natural beach, is situated in the middle of Lian Island. It is about 1800 meters long and averagely 150 meters wide, which makes it the largest beach in Jiangsu Province. Considering its fine sandy beaches, clean water and moderate temperature, Dashawan is regarded as one of the best beaches in eastern China.

=== Seashore Boardwalk ===
The Seashore Boardwalk is 2000 meters long, stretching to Dashawan in the west and Sumawan (苏马湾) in the east. Along the Seashore Boardwalk orderly lies the Forest Park, the Peacock Garden, the Fishing Islands and some other attractions, including a scenic walk.

=== Sumawan Natural Park ===
Sumawan (苏马湾) is also known as Valentine's Bay where couples prefer to take their wedding photos. It can be reached by walking along the Seashore Boardwalk till the end. Sumawan is surrounded by misty mountains except its side where lies the soft sandy beach as well as the clean blue sea. The singing of birds and the rustle of their wings add to Sumawan's natural charm.

=== Qiansan Islands ===
Qiansan Islands (前三岛) lie in the north-east of Lianyun district, consisting of Pingshan Island (平山岛), Dashan Island (达山岛) and Cheniushan Island (车牛山岛). There is a distance of 24 miles between Qiansan Islands and Lian Island. Travelers can take yachts for 2 and a half hours from Lian Island to get to Qiansan Islands.

== Statue of Deng Xiaoping ==
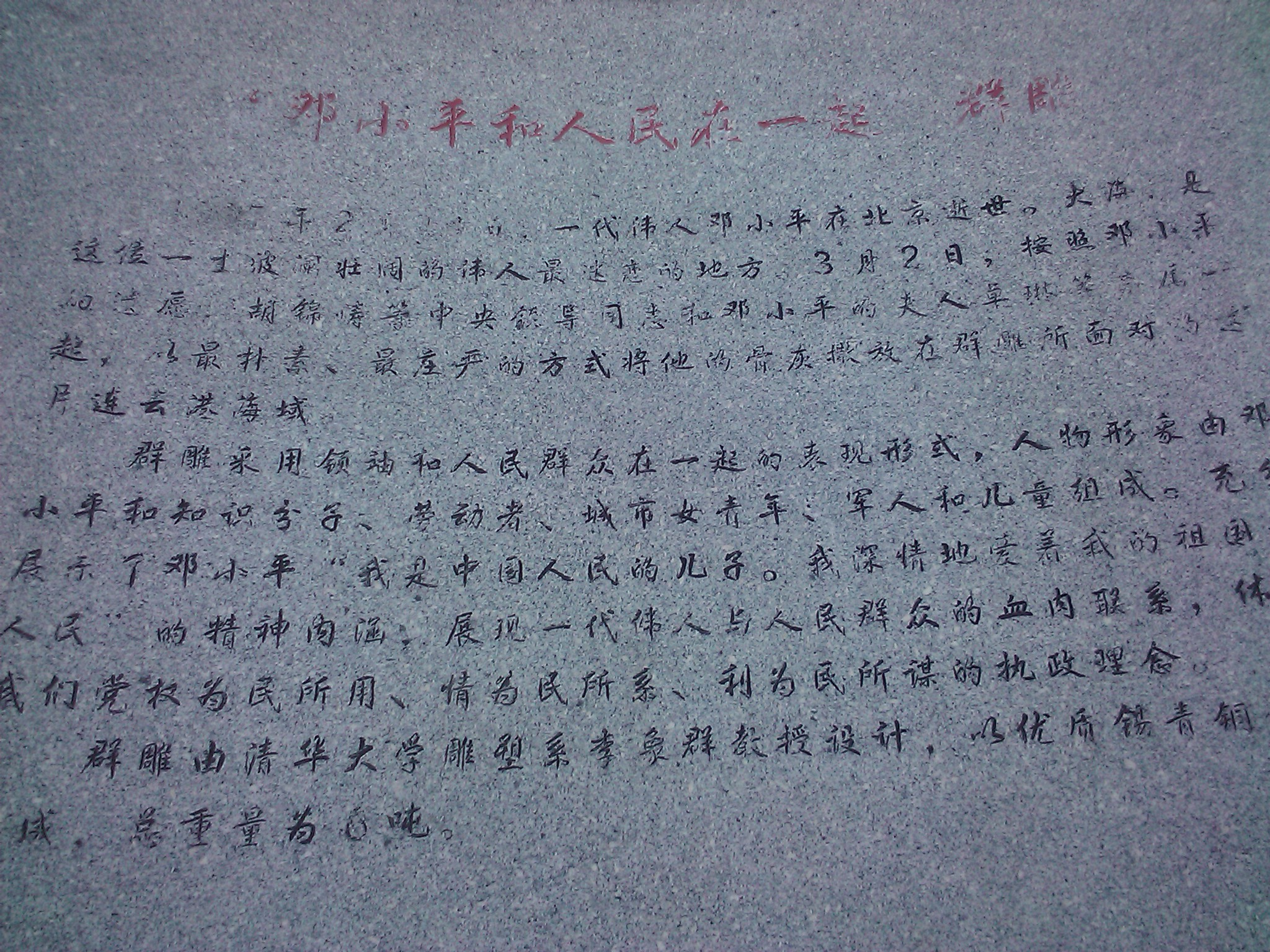
The stele with instruction near the statue

On the top of Lian Island stands a statue of Deng Xiaoping.

On February 19, 1997, Deng Xiaoping died in Beijing. Ocean is considered where the one with his whole lifetime full of miracles belongs to. On March 2, according to Deng's the wishes, Present Hu Jintao, together with Deng's wife Zhuo Lin, memorized this great man in a simple but solemn way by scattering his ashes into the sea the statue is facing. With a total weight of 6 tons, the statue which is made of high-quality bronze is designed by Professor Li Xiangqun (李象群) from the Statues and Sculptures College of Tsinghua University.
