= Xinpu District =

Former district of Jiangsu Province, China

Xinpu District (simplified Chinese: 新浦区; traditional Chinese: 新浦區; pinyin: Xīnpǔ Qū) is a former district of Lianyungang, Jiangsu province, China. It has been merged with Haizhou District.

The population as of 2004 was 322,000.
