= Lianyungang Baitabu Airport =

Military airport in Lianyungang, Jiangsu, China

Lianyungang Baitabu Airport 连云港白塔埠机场
- IATA: none; ICAO: none

Summary
- Airport type: Military
- Owner: People's Liberation Army
- Operator: People's Liberation Army Air Force
- Serves: Lianyungang
- Location: Lianyungang, Jiangsu, China
- Opened: 26 March 1985 (commercial)
- Passenger services ceased: 2 December 2021
- Built: 1957
- Coordinates: 34°34′18″N 118°52′25″E

Map
- Location of airport in Jiangsu

Runways
Direction	Length		Surface
Direction	m	ft	Surface
03/21	2,500	8,202	Concrete

Statistics (2021)
- Passengers: 1,233,272
- Aircraft movements: 15,116
- Cargo (metric tons): 8,415.6
- Source: CAAC

Chinese name
- Traditional Chinese: 連雲港白塔埠機場
- Simplified Chinese: 连云港白塔埠机场
Transcriptions
Standard Mandarin
- Hanyu Pinyin: Liányúngǎng Báitǎbù Jīchǎng

Lianyungang Baitabu Airport is a People's Liberation Army Air Force Base in the city of Lianyungang in East China's Jiangsu province. It served as the city's civilian airport from 26 March 1985 until 2 December 2021, when all commercial flights were transferred to the newly built Lianyungang Huaguoshan International Airport.

== See also ==
- List of airports in China
