= Guanyun County =

Guanyun 灌云县 Kwanyun
- County
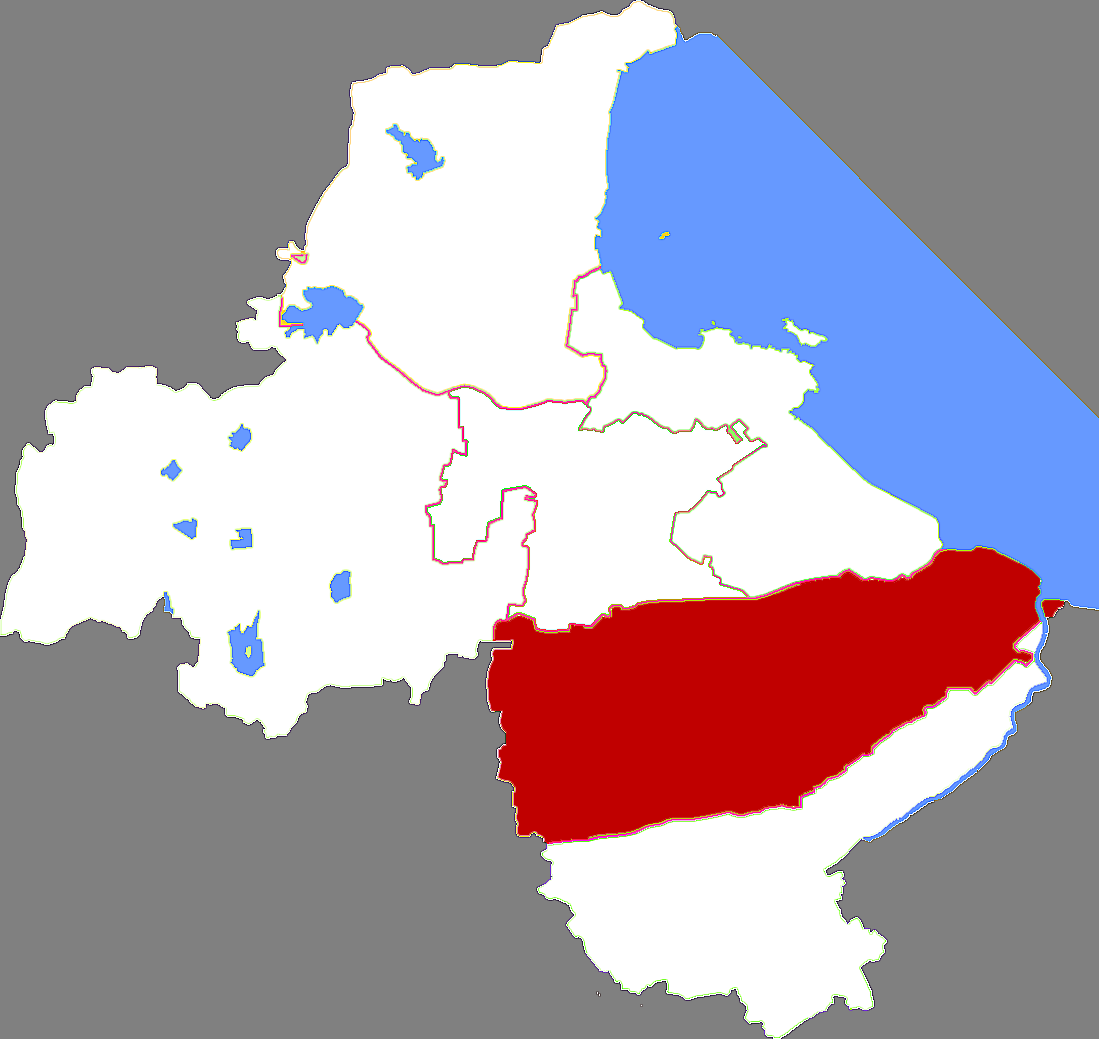

- Location in Jiangsu
- Coordinates: 34°24′58″N 119°28′01″E
- Country: People's Republic of China
- Province: Jiangsu
- Prefecture-level city: Lianyungang

Area
  - Total: 1,538 km^{2} (594 sq mi)

Population (2020)
  - Total: 1,026,000
  - Density: 667.1/km^{2} (1,728/sq mi)
- Time zone: UTC+8 (China Standard)
- Postal code: 222200

Guanyun County (simplified Chinese: 灌云县; traditional Chinese: 灌雲縣; pinyin: Guànyún Xiàn) is under the administration of Lianyungang, Jiangsu province, China. It borders the prefecture-level city of Suqian to the southwest and the Yellow Sea to the east. Guanyun County has an area of 1,538 km^{2} (594 sq mi) and a population of about 1,026,000 as of 2020.

== Toponymy ==
The name Guanyun is made of two Chinese characters, guan (Chinese: 灌; pinyin: guàn) and yun (simplified Chinese: 云; traditional Chinese: 雲; pinyin: yún), which are taken from the Guan River and Yuntai Mountain, which are both important landmarks in the county.

== History ==
The area of present-day Guanyun County was a major salt-making site for the Qing dynasty.

The county was formally established in April 1912.

== Geography ==
Guanyun is a coastal city of the East China Sea (the Yellow Sea) with a coastline of 32 km (20 mi). It borders Guannan County), Xiangshui County, Lianshui County, and Shuyang County.

The Guan River flows through the county eastwards into the East China Sea. The river is 77.5 km (48.2 mi) in length and its main tributary is Sihe River, flowing through the southern portion of the county.

A number of whales from the sea have been sighted swimming back into the river's waterway as deep as 10 km (6.2 mi) in recent years, prompting the formation of tough government regulations meant to minimize the impact of pollution on the county's water and environment.

=== Climate ===
Guanyun is situated in the north of Jiangsu Plain and has an oceanic monsoon climate, with distinct four seasons, like most of its neighbors. The annual average temperature is close its neighbors 15 °C, with 25 °C in summers and 5 °C in winters. Average rainfall is close to 1,000 m annually.

Climate data for Guanyun, elevation 5 m (16 ft), (1991–2020 normals, extremes 1981–present)
| Month | Jan | Feb | Mar | Apr | May | Jun | Jul | Aug | Sep | Oct | Nov | Dec | Year |
|---|---|---|---|---|---|---|---|---|---|---|---|---|---|
| Record high °C (°F) | 17.6 (63.7) | 25.3 (77.5) | 32.0 (89.6) | 31.4 (88.5) | 35.9 (96.6) | 36.9 (98.4) | 37.5 (99.5) | 36.2 (97.2) | 35.0 (95.0) | 32.5 (90.5) | 27.4 (81.3) | 19.7 (67.5) | 37.5 (99.5) |
| Mean daily maximum °C (°F) | 5.8 (42.4) | 8.5 (47.3) | 13.8 (56.8) | 20.1 (68.2) | 25.3 (77.5) | 29.2 (84.6) | 30.9 (87.6) | 30.3 (86.5) | 26.8 (80.2) | 21.9 (71.4) | 14.8 (58.6) | 8.1 (46.6) | 19.6 (67.3) |
| Daily mean °C (°F) | 0.8 (33.4) | 3.2 (37.8) | 8.0 (46.4) | 14.2 (57.6) | 19.7 (67.5) | 24.0 (75.2) | 26.9 (80.4) | 26.4 (79.5) | 22.2 (72.0) | 16.4 (61.5) | 9.6 (49.3) | 3.0 (37.4) | 14.5 (58.2) |
| Mean daily minimum °C (°F) | −3.0 (26.6) | −1.0 (30.2) | 3.3 (37.9) | 9.1 (48.4) | 14.7 (58.5) | 19.8 (67.6) | 23.9 (75.0) | 23.5 (74.3) | 18.5 (65.3) | 11.8 (53.2) | 5.3 (41.5) | −1 (30) | 10.4 (50.7) |
| Record low °C (°F) | −13.7 (7.3) | −15.3 (4.5) | −9.5 (14.9) | −1.6 (29.1) | 4.1 (39.4) | 10.8 (51.4) | 17.7 (63.9) | 14.5 (58.1) | 7.8 (46.0) | −0.9 (30.4) | −8.1 (17.4) | −14.5 (5.9) | −15.3 (4.5) |
| Average precipitation mm (inches) | 21.4 (0.84) | 25.9 (1.02) | 36.8 (1.45) | 46.1 (1.81) | 69.3 (2.73) | 106.2 (4.18) | 211.3 (8.32) | 196.8 (7.75) | 83.9 (3.30) | 36.5 (1.44) | 40.7 (1.60) | 21.2 (0.83) | 896.1 (35.27) |
| Average precipitation days (≥ 0.1 mm) | 4.8 | 5.6 | 6.5 | 6.4 | 8.4 | 8.1 | 13.7 | 11.8 | 8.2 | 5.6 | 5.9 | 4.4 | 89.4 |
| Average snowy days | 2.9 | 2.8 | 0.8 | 0 | 0 | 0 | 0 | 0 | 0 | 0 | 0.4 | 1.0 | 7.9 |
| Average relative humidity (%) | 68 | 68 | 67 | 67 | 72 | 74 | 83 | 84 | 79 | 73 | 72 | 69 | 73 |
| Mean monthly sunshine hours | 146.3 | 147.4 | 184.0 | 205.8 | 214.3 | 176.4 | 171.8 | 181.3 | 183.9 | 181.7 | 150.7 | 149.8 | 2,093.4 |
| Percentage possible sunshine | 46 | 47 | 49 | 52 | 50 | 41 | 39 | 44 | 50 | 52 | 49 | 49 | 47 |
Source: China Meteorological Administration

Climate data for Yanweigang Town, Guanyun, elevation 5 m (16 ft), (1991–2020 normals)
| Month | Jan | Feb | Mar | Apr | May | Jun | Jul | Aug | Sep | Oct | Nov | Dec | Year |
|---|---|---|---|---|---|---|---|---|---|---|---|---|---|
| Mean daily maximum °C (°F) | 4.8 (40.6) | 6.9 (44.4) | 11.0 (51.8) | 17.9 (64.2) | 23.2 (73.8) | 26.7 (80.1) | 29.8 (85.6) | 29.1 (84.4) | 26.0 (78.8) | 20.7 (69.3) | 13.9 (57.0) | 7.6 (45.7) | 18.1 (64.6) |
| Daily mean °C (°F) | 1.5 (34.7) | 3.2 (37.8) | 7.1 (44.8) | 13.2 (55.8) | 18.8 (65.8) | 22.9 (73.2) | 26.6 (79.9) | 26.3 (79.3) | 23.0 (73.4) | 17.1 (62.8) | 10.0 (50.0) | 4.1 (39.4) | 14.5 (58.1) |
| Mean daily minimum °C (°F) | −1.2 (29.8) | 0.2 (32.4) | 4.0 (39.2) | 9.6 (49.3) | 15.0 (59.0) | 19.8 (67.6) | 23.9 (75.0) | 24.0 (75.2) | 20.3 (68.5) | 13.8 (56.8) | 6.6 (43.9) | 1.2 (34.2) | 11.4 (52.6) |
| Average precipitation mm (inches) | 24.2 (0.95) | 24.7 (0.97) | 40.7 (1.60) | 44.5 (1.75) | 60.3 (2.37) | 113.3 (4.46) | 210.7 (8.30) | 230.2 (9.06) | 72.0 (2.83) | 39.4 (1.55) | 39.5 (1.56) | 21.2 (0.83) | 920.7 (36.23) |
| Average precipitation days (≥ 0.1 mm) | 5.5 | 5.2 | 7.5 | 6.0 | 8.4 | 7.1 | 11.5 | 10.6 | 6.6 | 5.9 | 4.8 | 4.5 | 83.6 |
| Average snowy days | 2.5 | 2.2 | 0.8 | 0 | 0 | 0 | 0 | 0 | 0 | 0 | 0.1 | 1.2 | 6.8 |
| Average relative humidity (%) | 70 | 70 | 73 | 72 | 75 | 80 | 85 | 84 | 74 | 71 | 71 | 70 | 75 |
| Mean monthly sunshine hours | 162.0 | 175.7 | 192.4 | 216.7 | 240.9 | 204.2 | 213.1 | 214.7 | 218.0 | 205.8 | 171.8 | 161.9 | 2,377.2 |
| Percentage possible sunshine | 52 | 56 | 52 | 55 | 56 | 47 | 49 | 52 | 59 | 59 | 56 | 53 | 54 |
Source: China Meteorological Administration

== Administration ==
Guanyun County is under the jurisdiction of prefecture-level city of Lianyungang. The county comprises 1 subdistrict, 12 towns, and 4 other township-level divisions. These administer 27 residential communities and 302 administrative villages. The county government is stationed in the town of Yishan.

=== Subdistricts ===
The county's sole subdistrict is Shizhuang Subdistrict.

=== Towns ===
The county's 12 towns are Yishan, Yangji, Yanweigang, Tongxing, Sidui, Weifeng, Longju, Xiache, Tuhe, Dongwangji, Xiaoyi, and Nangang.

=== Other township-level divisions ===
Guanyun County also administers 4 other areas with township-level status: Wutuhe Farm (Chinese: 五图河农场), Guanxi Saltworks (Chinese: 灌西盐场), Guanyun Economic Development Zone (Chinese: 灌云经济开发区), and Guanyun Lingang Industrial Zone (Chinese: 灌云临港产业区).

== Demographics ==
The county has an estimated population of 1,026,000 in 2020, up from the 817,509 recorded in the 2010 Chinese Census. The county's population in the 2000 Chinese Census was 1,030,069, and a 1996 estimate of the county's population totaled 965,000.

== Economy ==
As of 2020, Guanyun County has gross domestic product of ¥38.164 billion, and an industrial output totaling ¥8.93 billion. The county's urban residents and rural residents had average annual per capita disposable incomes of ¥30,329.6 and ¥17,958.7, respectively.

The county has a deepwater port, Yanwei Port, meaning "Swallow Tail Port" in Chinese, located at the mouth of Guan River, close to the East China Sea.

Guanyun County also contributes to 60% of China's annual lingerie production.

=== Agriculture ===
Guanyun County traditionally depended on its agricultural and fishery sectors. Currently, the county produces significant amounts of grain and fungi, and raises a significant amount of hogs.

=== Service industry ===
As of 2020, the value of the county's service industry totaled ¥17 billion.

Over years, a few of industrial sectors have been added to the county's economy, including navigation, waterway transportation industries.

== Transportation ==
Lianyungang Huaguoshan International Airport is located in Guanyun County and will open on December 2, 2021.

Guanyun is connected to the rest of Jiangsu Prevince by four expressways (Nanjing-Lianyungang, Feng-Guanyun, Lianyungang-Xuzhou and Lianyungang-Yancheng expressways) and four highway (G204, G236, G324 and G242). Within its boundary, a river network provides the county with cheap and convenient transportation.

In the inner city, the public transportation including bus, taxi and cargo transport, charted buses to near cities or towns, provides convenience to commuters even if the system still needs a major improvement.

== Education ==
Guanyun has instituted a compulsory primary education system, and multiple secondary schools. There are no higher learning institutions in the county.

== Tourism ==
Guanyun County is home to a number of ecotourist sites, including Kaishan Island Scenic Region, Dayishan Mountain Scenic Region, and more.
