= Lianyun, Lianyungang =

Lianyun 连云区
- District
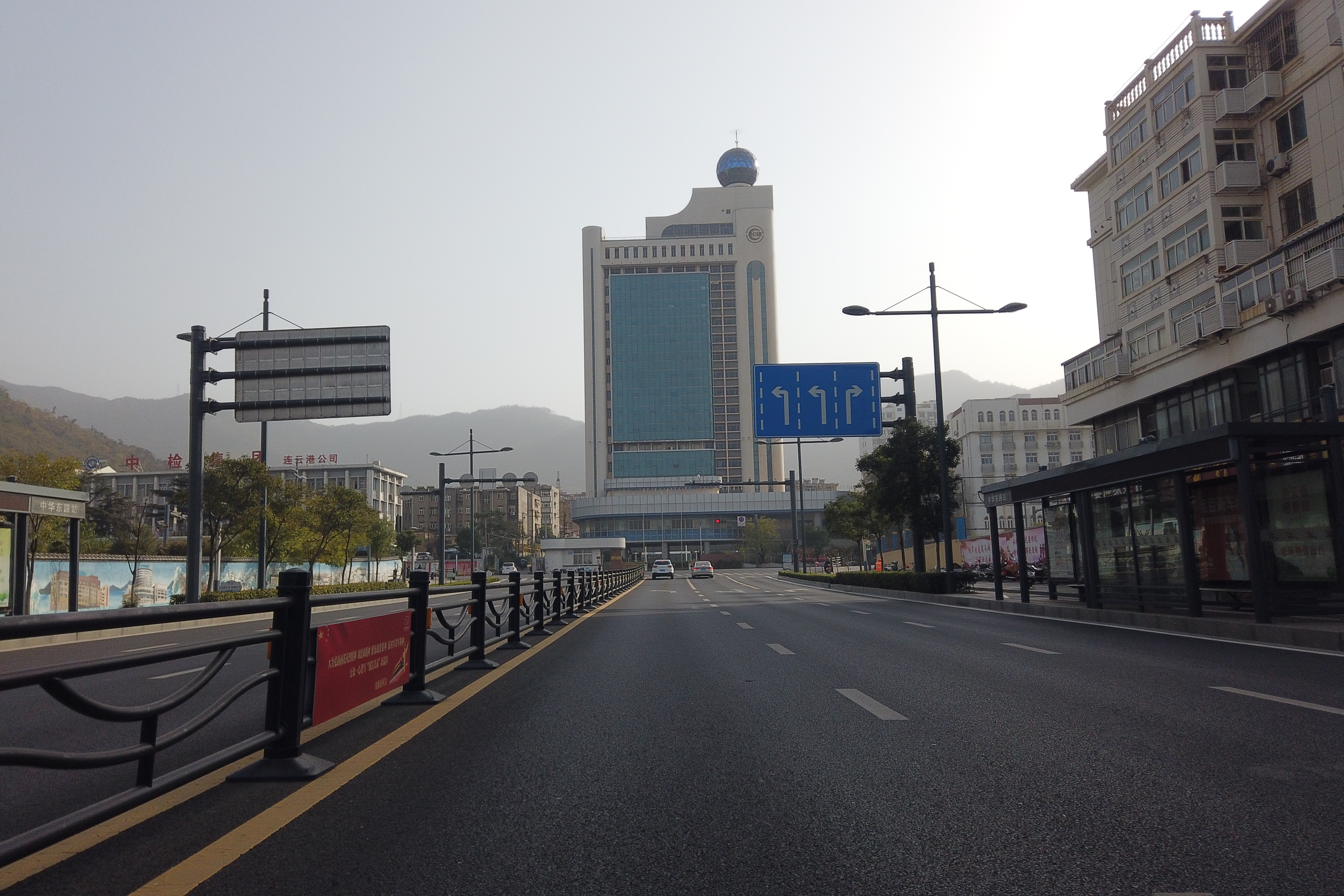
- Lianyun District in October 2019

- Location in Jiangsu
- Coordinates: 34°38′10″N 119°26′06″E
- Country: People's Republic of China
- Province: Jiangsu
- Prefecture-level city: Lianyungang

Area
  - Total: 836 km^{2} (323 sq mi)

Population (2014)
  - Total: 250,000
  - Density: 300/km^{2} (770/sq mi)
- Time zone: UTC+8 (China Standard)
- Postal code: 222042

Lianyun District (simplified Chinese: 连云区; traditional Chinese: 連雲區; pinyin: Liányún Qū) is one of three urban districts of Lianyungang, Jiangsu province, China.

== Administrative divisions ==
Lianyun District has 7 subdistricts, 1 town and 3 townships.

7 subdistricts

- Xugou (墟沟街道)
- Liandao (连云街道)
- Zhongyun (中云街道)
- Liandao (连岛街道)
- Banqiao (板桥街道)
- Yunshan (云山街道)
- Houzui (猴嘴街道)

1 town

- Chaoyang (朝阳镇)

3 townships

- Sucheng (宿城乡)
- Gaogongdao (高公岛乡)
- Qiansandao (前三岛乡)

== Climate ==
Climate data for Lianyun District (Lian Island), elevation 27 m (89 ft), (1991–2020 normals, extremes 1981–present)
Month	Jan	Feb	Mar	Apr	May	Jun	Jul	Aug	Sep	Oct	Nov	Dec	Year
Record high °C (°F)	13.6 (56.5)	22.8 (73.0)	24.9 (76.8)	31.9 (89.4)	35.5 (95.9)	35.9 (96.6)	39.5 (103.1)	36.5 (97.7)	33.7 (92.7)	29.3 (84.7)	25.1 (77.2)	19.4 (66.9)	39.5 (103.1)
Mean daily maximum °C (°F)	4.4 (39.9)	6.5 (43.7)	11.5 (52.7)	17.9 (64.2)	23.3 (73.9)	26.2 (79.2)	29.2 (84.6)	29.0 (84.2)	25.7 (78.3)	20.7 (69.3)	13.8 (56.8)	7.1 (44.8)	17.9 (64.3)
Daily mean °C (°F)	1.9 (35.4)	3.6 (38.5)	8.0 (46.4)	13.9 (57.0)	19.5 (67.1)	23.1 (73.6)	26.6 (79.9)	26.7 (80.1)	23.4 (74.1)	18.1 (64.6)	11.3 (52.3)	4.6 (40.3)	15.1 (59.1)
Mean daily minimum °C (°F)	−0.1 (31.8)	1.4 (34.5)	5.3 (41.5)	10.9 (51.6)	16.5 (61.7)	20.7 (69.3)	24.4 (75.9)	24.7 (76.5)	21.3 (70.3)	15.9 (60.6)	9.0 (48.2)	2.5 (36.5)	12.7 (54.9)
Record low °C (°F)	−9.0 (15.8)	−8.3 (17.1)	−5.2 (22.6)	0.7 (33.3)	8.7 (47.7)	13.5 (56.3)	17.7 (63.9)	15.8 (60.4)	14.0 (57.2)	4.3 (39.7)	−4.7 (23.5)	−9.6 (14.7)	−9.6 (14.7)
Average precipitation mm (inches)	20.9 (0.82)	24.9 (0.98)	34.1 (1.34)	43.1 (1.70)	70.2 (2.76)	97.0 (3.82)	235.1 (9.26)	188.4 (7.42)	90.2 (3.55)	36.9 (1.45)	40.3 (1.59)	21.6 (0.85)	902.7 (35.54)
Average precipitation days (≥ 0.1 mm)	4.6	5.3	5.8	6.7	8.0	7.5	13.0	11.4	7.5	5.1	5.7	4.2	84.8
Average snowy days	2.6	2.3	0.8	0.1	0	0	0	0	0	0	0.3	1.0	7.1
Average relative humidity (%)	64	66	65	65	68	77	81	80	71	64	64	63	69
Mean monthly sunshine hours	157.5	157.3	199.7	217.5	233.9	199.9	196.4	206.1	198.7	198.8	162.9	159.5	2,288.2
Percentage possible sunshine	50	51	54	55	54	46	45	50	54	57	53	52	52
Source: China Meteorological Administration all-time extreme temperature

== See also ==
- Lian Island
