= Haizhou, Lianyungang =

Haizhou 海州区
- District
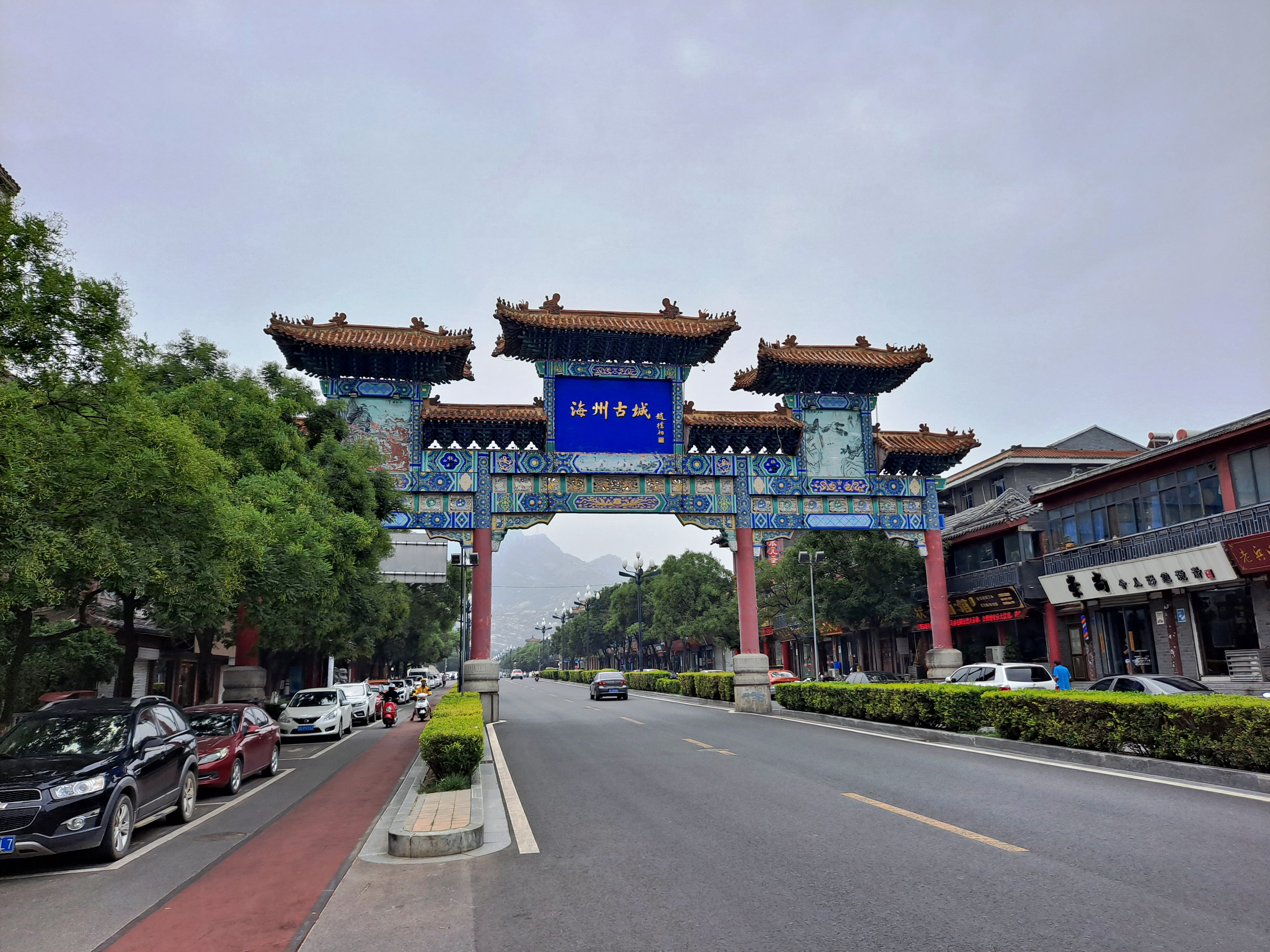

- Location in Jiangsu
- Coordinates: 34°34′16″N 119°11′38″E
- Country: People's Republic of China
- Province: Jiangsu
- Prefecture-level city: Lianyungang

Area
  - Total: 701 km^{2} (271 sq mi)

Population (2014)
  - Total: 1,101,000
  - Density: 1,570/km^{2} (4,070/sq mi)
- Time zone: UTC+8 (China Standard)
- Postal code: 222000 ~ 222023
- Division code: HIZ

Haizhou District (simplified Chinese: 海州区; traditional Chinese: 海州區; pinyin: Hǎizhōu Qū) is one of three urban districts of Lianyungang, Jiangsu province, China.

Xinpu District was a former district of Lianyungang, Jiangsu province, China. Now, it's merged into Haizhou District.

== Administrative divisions ==
At present, Haizhou District (including the former Xinpu District which was merged into Haizhou District) has 10 subdistricts, 5 towns and 3 townships.

- Old Haizhou District has 4 subdistricts, 3 towns and 1 township
- Former Xinpu District (新浦区) has 6 subdistricts, 2 towns and 2 townships

10 subdistricts

-Old Haizhou District

- Haizhou (海州街道)
- Xingfulu (幸福路街道)
- Quyang (朐阳街道)
- Hongmen (洪门街道)

-Former Xinpu District

- Pudong (浦东街道)
- Puxi (浦西街道)
- Xindong (新东街道)
- Xinnan (新南街道)
- Lunan (路南街道)
- Xinhai (新海街道)

5 towns

-Old Haizhou District

- Xinba (新坝镇)
- Jinping (锦屏镇)
- Banpu (板浦镇)

-Former Xinpu District

- Nancheng (南城镇)
- Punan (浦南镇)

3 townships

-Old Haizhou District

- Ninghai (宁海乡)

-Former Xinpu District

- Yuntai (云台乡)
- Huaguoshan (花果山乡)
