= Lianyungang =

Lianyungang 连云港市 Lienyunkang
- Prefecture-level city
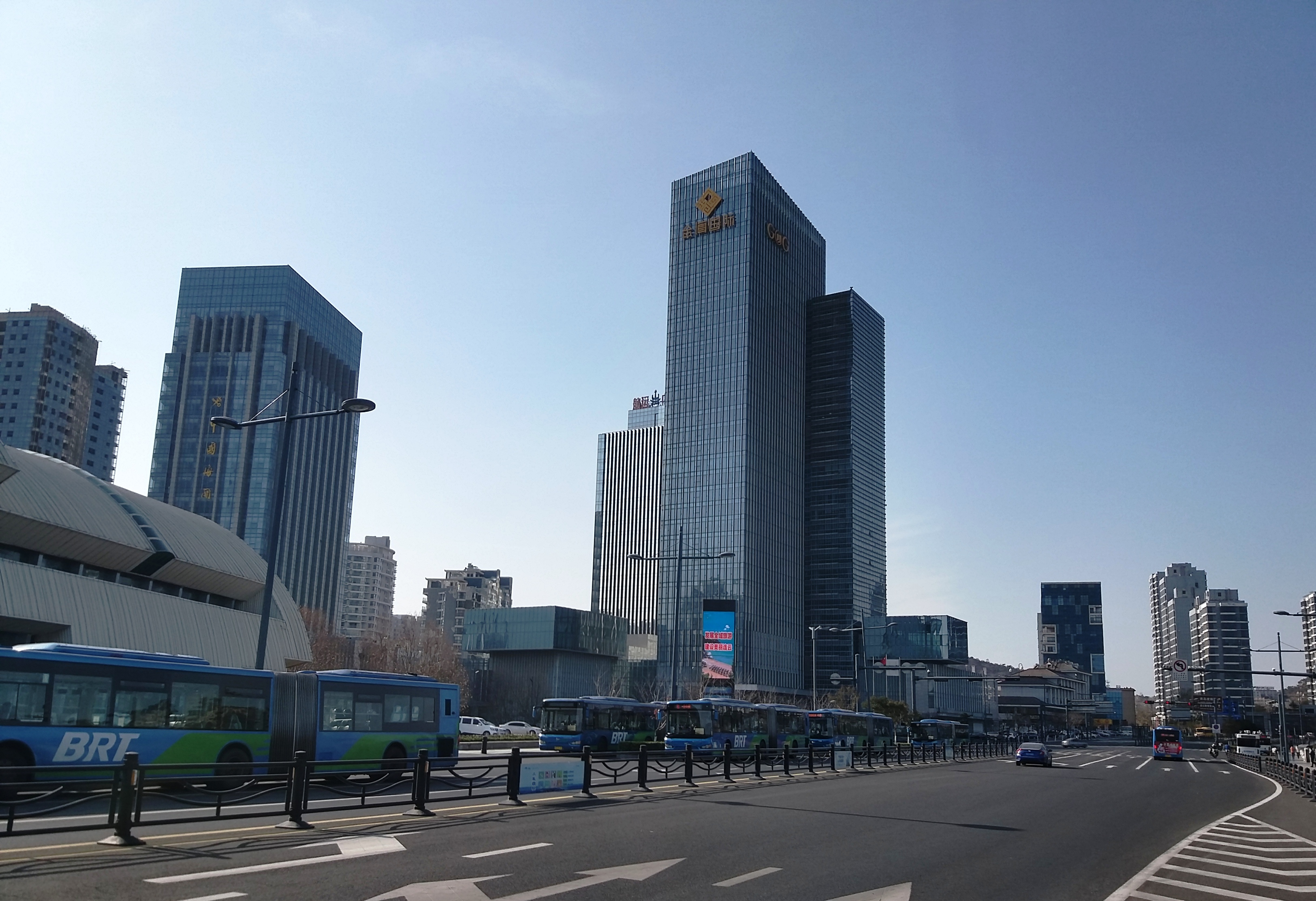
- skylines of Lianyungang

- Lianyungang is highlighted on this map of Jiangsu
- Interactive map of Lianyungang
- Location of the city center in Jiangsu Lianyungang (Eastern China) Lianyungang (China)
- Coordinates (Lianyungang municipal government): 34°35′48″N 119°13′17″E
- Country: People's Republic of China
- Province: Jiangsu
- Municipal seat: Haizhou District

Government
  - Type: Prefecture-level city
  - CPC secretary: Yang Xingshi (杨省世)
  - Mayor: Xiang Xuelong (项雪龙)

Area
  - Prefecture-level city: 7,154 km^{2} (2,762 sq mi)
  - Land: 7,444 km^{2} (2,874 sq mi)
  - Urban: 2,252 km^{2} (870 sq mi)
  - Metro: 738 km^{2} (285 sq mi)

Population (2020 census)
  - Prefecture-level city: 4,599,360
  - Density: 617.9/km^{2} (1,600/sq mi)
  - Urban: 2,214,611
  - Urban density: 983.4/km^{2} (2,547/sq mi)
  - Metro: 1,210,767
  - Metro density: 1,640/km^{2} (4,250/sq mi)

GDP
  - Prefecture-level city: CN¥ 277 billion US$ 42 billion
  - Per capita: CN¥ 61,332; US$ 9,286
- Time zone: UTC+8 (China Standard)
- Postal code: 222000 (Urban center); 222100-222300, 222500 (Other areas)
- Area code: 518
- ISO 3166 code: CN-JS-07
- Major Nationalities: Han
- County-level divisions: 7
- License Plate: 苏G
- City Tree: Ginkgo
- City Flower: Magnolia
- Website: www.lyg.gov.cn

Lianyungang
- Simplified Chinese: 连云港
- Traditional Chinese: 連雲港
- Hanyu Pinyin: Liányúngǎng
- Literal meaning: Port connected to the clouds
Transcriptions
Standard Mandarin
- Hanyu Pinyin: Liányúngǎng
- Wade–Giles: Lien^{2}-yün^{2}-kang^{3}
- IPA: [ljɛ̌n.y̌n.kàŋ]
Wu
- Romanization: lie^{平}yiuin^{平}kaon^{上}
Yue: Cantonese
- Jyutping: lin^{4}wan^{4}gong^{2}
Southern Min
- Hokkien POJ: Liânhûnkáng

Other names
- Chinese: 海州
- Literal meaning: City of the Sea
Transcriptions
Standard Mandarin
- Hanyu Pinyin: Hǎizhoū
- Wade–Giles: Hai3 Chou1

Lianyungang (simplified Chinese: 连云港; traditional Chinese: 連雲港; pinyin: Liányúngǎng) is a prefecture-level city in northeastern Jiangsu province, China. It borders Yancheng to its southeast, Huai'an and Suqian to its south, Xuzhou to its southwest, and the province of Shandong to its north. Its name derives from Lian Island, the largest island in Jiangsu which lies off its coastline, and Yuntai Mountain, the highest peak in Jiangsu, a few miles from the city center, and the fact that it is a port. The name can be literally translated as the Port Connecting the Clouds.

Lianyungang was home to 4.65 million inhabitants as of the 2020 census whom 1,210,767 lived in the built-up (or metro) area made of Haizhou and Lianyun counties. Lianyungang was known in the West as Haichow (Postal romanization), which means the City of Sea. Haichow was opened to foreign trade by the Qing imperial government in 1905.

== Geography ==
Lianyungang is between 118°24' and 119°48' east longitude and 34°11' and 35°07' north latitude. Lianyungang covers an area of 7,777 km^{2} (3,003 sq mi). Lianyungang City is located in the central coastal area of China, in the northeastern part of Jiangsu Province. It borders the Yellow Sea in the east, faces North Korea, South Korea and Japan across the sea, borders Rizhao City in Shandong Province in the north, Linyi City in Shandong Province and Xuzhou City in Jiangsu Province in the west, and Suqian City, Huai'an City and Yancheng City in Jiangsu Province in the south.

== Administration ==
The prefecture-level city of Lianyungang administers six county-level divisions, including three districts and three counties.

Map
Subdivision	Simplified Chinese	Hanyu Pinyin	Population (2020)	Area (km^{2})	Density (/km^{2})
City Proper
Lianyun District	连云区	Liányún Qū	292,762	805.9	363.3
Haizhou District	海州区	Hǎizhōu Qū	918,005	690.6	1,329
Suburban
Ganyu District	赣榆区	Gànyú Qū	1,003,844	1,454	690.4
Donghai County	东海县	Dōnghǎi Xiàn	1,047,357	2,031	515.7
Rural
Guanyun County	灌云县	Guànyún Xiàn	725,047	1,551	467.5
Guannan County	灌南县	Guànnán Xiàn	612,345	1,028	595.7
Total			4.65 million	7,560	608.4
Dissolved district: Xinpu District

== Economy ==
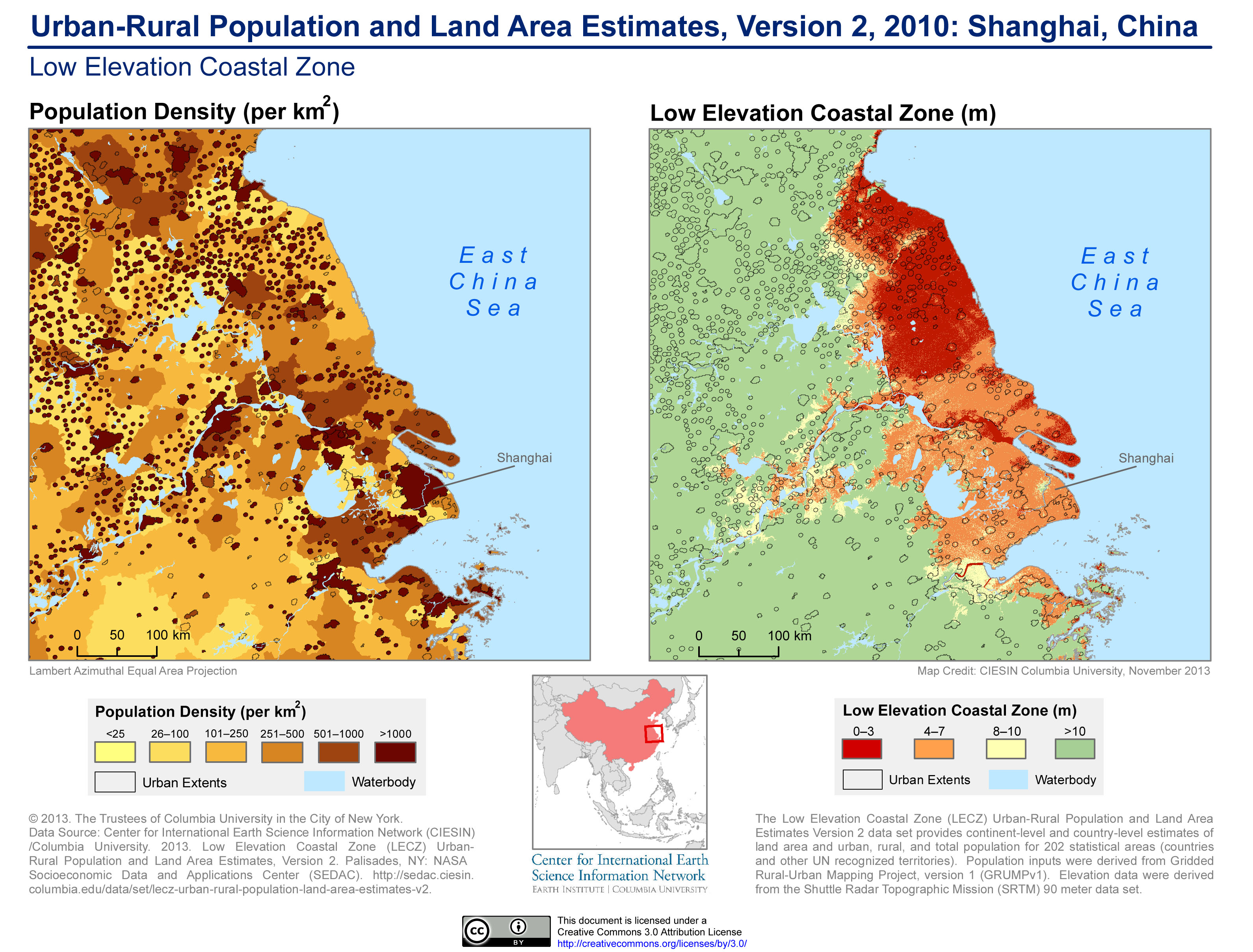
Population density and low elevation coastal zones in the Shanghai area. Lianyungang is particularly vulnerable to sea level rise.

Lianyungang is one of the first 14 Chinese coastal cities opening to the outside world and a rising center of industry, foreign trade, and tourism in east China. It is the eastern terminus of the New Eurasian Land Bridge and the proposed Northern East West Freight Corridor. The New Eurasia Continental Landbridge continue by land, connecting Lianyungang with over 40 countries and regions in Europe, South Asia and the Middle East by railway networks.

The Lianyun-Port, in the center of the coast, links eastern sea routes with western land routes. Japan and South Korea in the east can be reached economically and conveniently from Lianyungang. Near the port, the Tianwan Nuclear Power Plant is one of the biggest nuclear power plants in China, with two operational units and six more planned. Lianyungang is also rich in mineral resources. Donghai County has 70% of the national reserve of natural crystal, and is manufacturing 80% of China's crystal products.

The Chinese government has stated its intention to build an economic belt along the New Eurasia Continental Landbridge in "the Ninth Five-Year Plan of the National Economy and Social Development and the Long-range Goal for the Year 2010." On "China's 21st Century Agenda", Lianyungang is to be developed into an international seaport linking countries on the Pacific rim with those in Central Asia. In the "National Ocean Development Plan" it is listed as one of three special development zones.

Lianyungang Economic & Technological Development Zone was approved by the State Council as one of the first batch of state-level development zones in December 1984. It is in the eastern new seashore urban area of Liangyungang City. The distance to the nearest airport, Liangyungang Airport is 10–20 km (6.2–12.4 mi) and the distance to the nearest highway G310 is 10–20 km (6.2–12.4 mi). Lianyungang port is 20–50 km (12–31 mi).

On July 18, 2019, began a construction on a large petrochemical storage dock in the Xuwei area of the port of Lianyungang.

== Climate ==
The temperature in Lianyungang can reach average highs of 30 °C in the summer and drop to as low as −4 °C in the winter. Lianyungang's climate is classified by Köppen and Geiger as Cwa (humid subtropical climate with dry winters). Due to the regulation of the ocean, the climate type is a humid monsoon climate with slightly maritime climate characteristics. Climate characteristics: four distinct seasons, cold and dry in winter, hot and rainy in summer. There is sufficient sunlight and moderate rainfall.

The vast majority of precipitation occurs between June and August, where it can measure up to 278mm of rainfall on average. Winter precipitation is quite low, making snowfall rare and short-lived. Extremes since 1961 have ranged from a record high of 40.2 °C (104 °F) on July 15, 2002, to a record low of −18.1 °C (−1 °F) on 5 February 1969.

Climate data for Lianyungang, elevation 5 m (16 ft), (1991–2020 normals, extremes 1961–present)
Month	Jan	Feb	Mar	Apr	May	Jun	Jul	Aug	Sep	Oct	Nov	Dec	Year
Record high °C (°F)	17.5 (63.5)	24.8 (76.6)	31.4 (88.5)	33.1 (91.6)	37.1 (98.8)	37.9 (100.2)	40.2 (104.4)	37.8 (100.0)	35.8 (96.4)	32.4 (90.3)	27.7 (81.9)	21.4 (70.5)	40.2 (104.4)
Mean daily maximum °C (°F)	5.6 (42.1)	8.4 (47.1)	13.8 (56.8)	20.2 (68.4)	25.5 (77.9)	29.2 (84.6)	31.0 (87.8)	30.3 (86.5)	26.9 (80.4)	21.8 (71.2)	14.7 (58.5)	7.9 (46.2)	19.6 (67.3)
Daily mean °C (°F)	1.0 (33.8)	3.4 (38.1)	8.3 (46.9)	14.5 (58.1)	20.0 (68.0)	24.1 (75.4)	27.1 (80.8)	26.6 (79.9)	22.6 (72.7)	16.7 (62.1)	9.8 (49.6)	3.2 (37.8)	14.8 (58.6)
Mean daily minimum °C (°F)	−2.6 (27.3)	−0.6 (30.9)	3.7 (38.7)	9.6 (49.3)	15.3 (59.5)	20.0 (68.0)	24.0 (75.2)	23.7 (74.7)	19.0 (66.2)	12.6 (54.7)	5.8 (42.4)	−0.5 (31.1)	10.8 (51.5)
Record low °C (°F)	−12.3 (9.9)	−18.1 (−0.6)	−9.1 (15.6)	−1.4 (29.5)	5.5 (41.9)	12.6 (54.7)	18.0 (64.4)	15.6 (60.1)	9.7 (49.5)	−0.1 (31.8)	−7.1 (19.2)	−12.1 (10.2)	−18.1 (−0.6)
Average precipitation mm (inches)	17.5 (0.69)	22.3 (0.88)	33.0 (1.30)	42.5 (1.67)	63.9 (2.52)	106.6 (4.20)	252.5 (9.94)	198.5 (7.81)	79.7 (3.14)	33.4 (1.31)	36.0 (1.42)	18.7 (0.74)	904.6 (35.62)
Average precipitation days (≥ 0.1 mm)	4.6	5.5	6.0	6.4	8.1	7.3	13.6	12.1	7.6	5.6	5.7	4.4	86.9
Average snowy days	2.7	3.0	1.2	0.1	0	0	0	0	0	0	0.5	1.3	8.8
Average relative humidity (%)	66	66	64	65	69	74	82	83	76	70	69	66	71
Mean monthly sunshine hours	156.8	156.8	200.2	220.7	232.1	193.8	182.7	192.2	190.7	189.2	159.4	160.0	2,234.6
Percentage possible sunshine	50	50	54	56	54	45	42	47	52	55	52	52	51
Source: China Meteorological Administration

== Tourism ==
=== Lian Island Resort ===
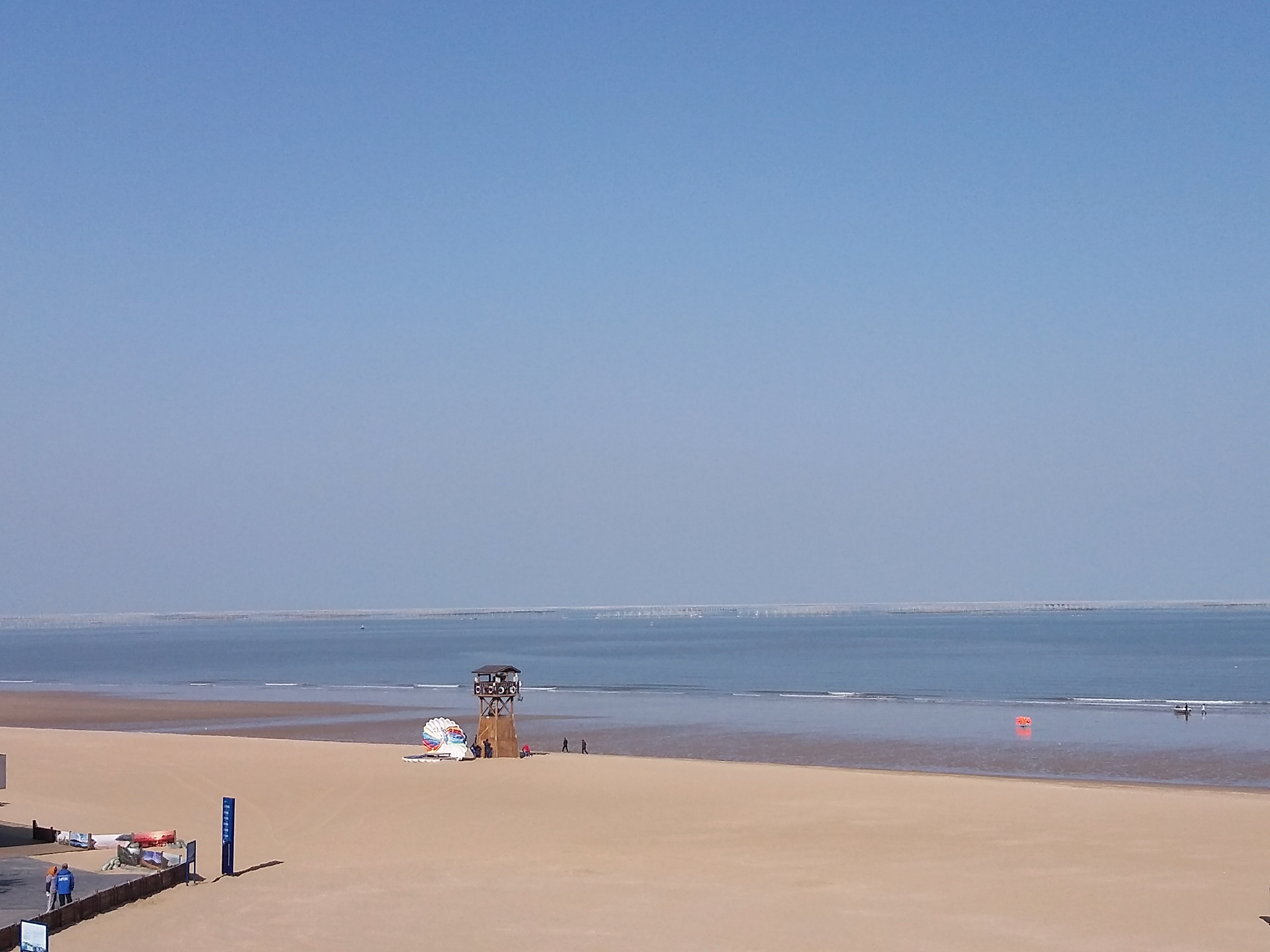
The sea beach of Lian Island Resort

A popular tourist attraction is in Lianyungang. It is an AAAA-Class beachfront in Jiangsu Province, Lian Island (Chinese: 连岛; pinyin: lián dǎo) is an island connected to Lianyun District by a 6.7 km (4.2 mi) sea dyke, the longest in China. Lindao has a forest coverage rate reaches 80%. According to national standards, the water temperature suitable for swimming is 108 days in a year. Liandao has a monsoon marine climate transitioning from warm temperate zone to subtropical zone. It is close to the Haizhou Bay fishery. It has a wide variety of plants, abundant seafood, and unique resource advantages of sea erosion geology. There are two main beach and swimming areas, several places to eat, as well as hotels. Lian Island is home to an annual music extravaganza featuring some of China's most famous pop stars.

=== Huaguo Mountain ===
Lianyungang City, where Huaguoshan Scenic Area is located, is located in the middle of China's thousands of miles of maritime territory, in the northeast of Jiangsu Province, bordering the Yellow Sea to the east, the Central Plains to the west, Qilu to the north, Jianghuai to the south, and facing Japan and the Korean Peninsula across the sea. The scenic area covers an area of 75.39 square kilometers and has 136 peaks. Among them, the Yunu Peak of Huaguo Mountain is the highest peak in Jiangsu Province, with an altitude of 624.4 meters and majestic cliffs.

Lianyungang is famous for its "Huaguo Shan, Shuilian Dong" (花果山水簾洞) attraction. Shuiliandong literally means the Water Curtain Hole since, according to legend, the hole was hidden behind a waterfall therefore resembling a "curtain of water". The hole is famous because according to legend it is the home of Sun Wukong, commonly known as the Monkey King from the epic novel Journey to the West. He and his monkey subjects lived in this hole underneath the mountain. After learning Tao, the Monkey King traveled back to the hole so that he and his subjects could eat and play for eternity. Eventually, the Jade Emperor sent heavenly armies to battle him at this spot because of his misdeeds. While the Monkey King story is a work of fiction Xuanzang, the monk he accompanies on the journey of the novel, was based on a historical person.

=== Jade Maiden Peak ===
Jade Maiden Peak, with an altitude of 625 meters, was formed during the Paleozoic Era. The name of Jade Girl Peak comes from the fact that Jade Girl Peak stands tall and tall for dozens of feet, and looks like a graceful girl from a distance.

== Transport ==
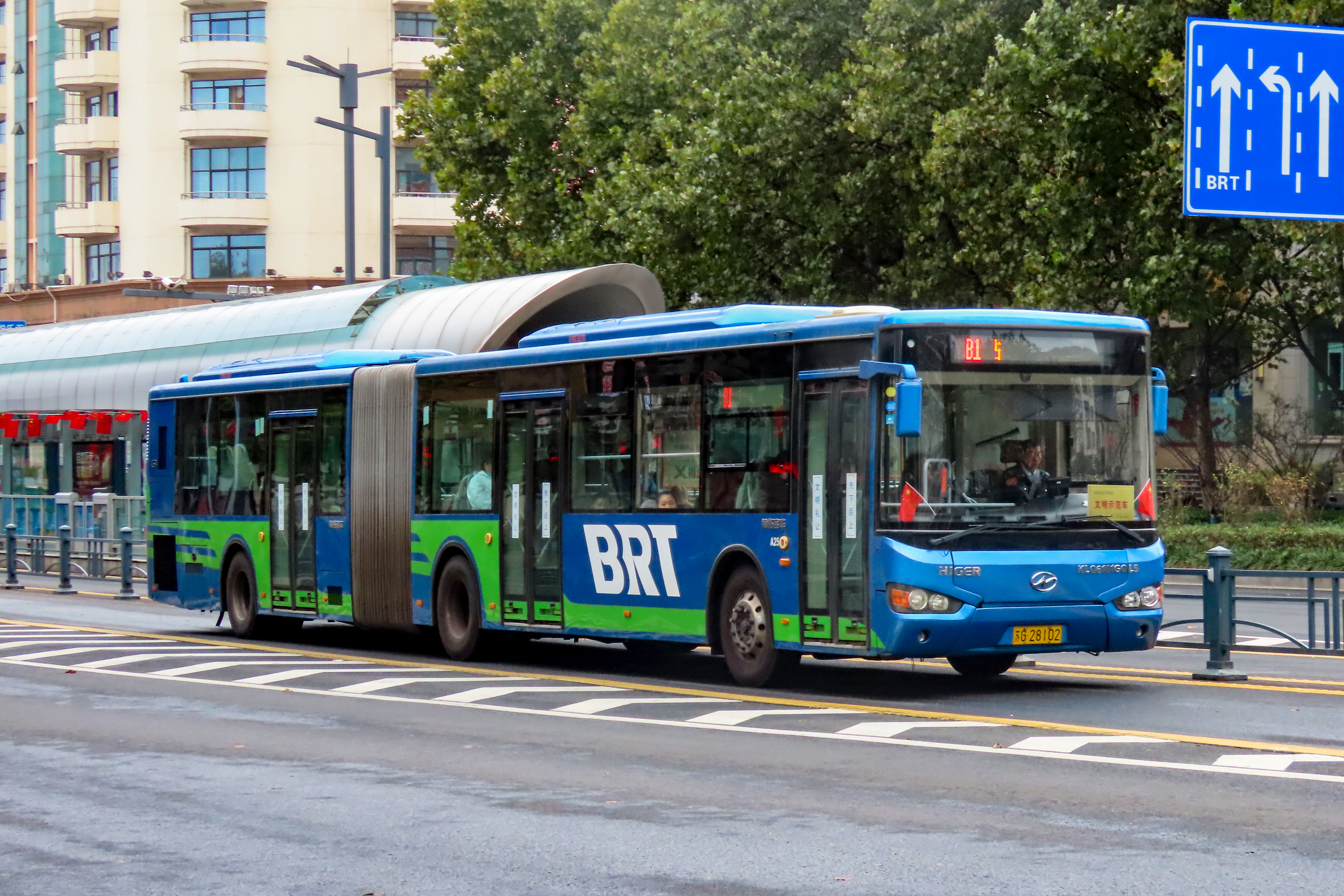
Lianyungang BRT

Lianyungang has convenient transport including highway, railways, port and airport. It is one of the 42 major transportation hub cities in China.

=== Airport ===
Lianyungang Huaguoshan International Airport, 20 km (12 mi) south of downtown Lianyungang, provides scheduled passenger service to dozens of airports in China. Lianyungang Baitabu Airport (IATA: LYG, ICAO: ZSLG) was a dual-use military and public airport serving the city of Lianyungang. All flights were transferred to Lianyungang Huaguoshan Airport on 2 December 2021.

=== Railway ===
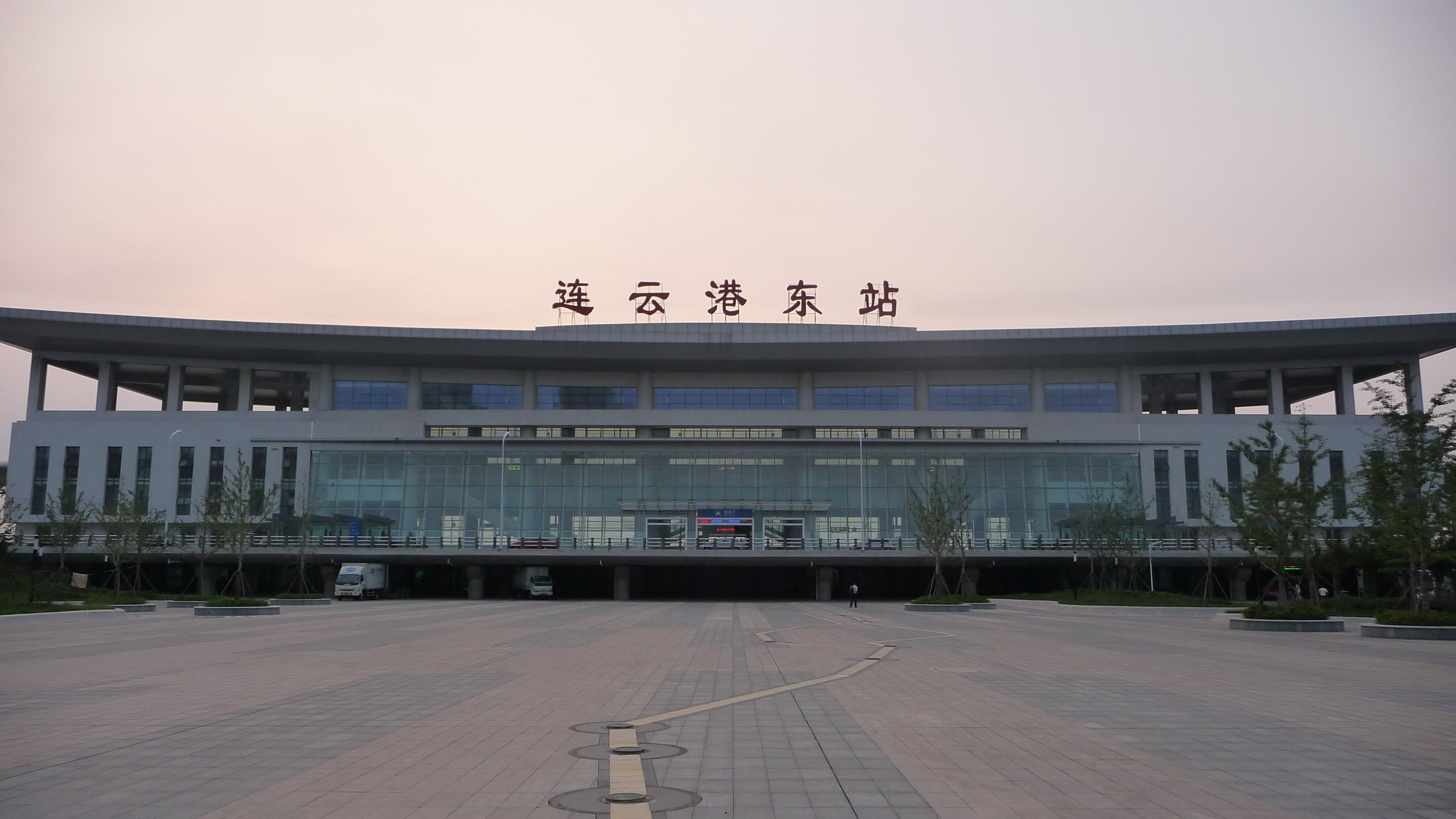
Lianyungangdong railway station is the start of the New Eurasian Land Bridge

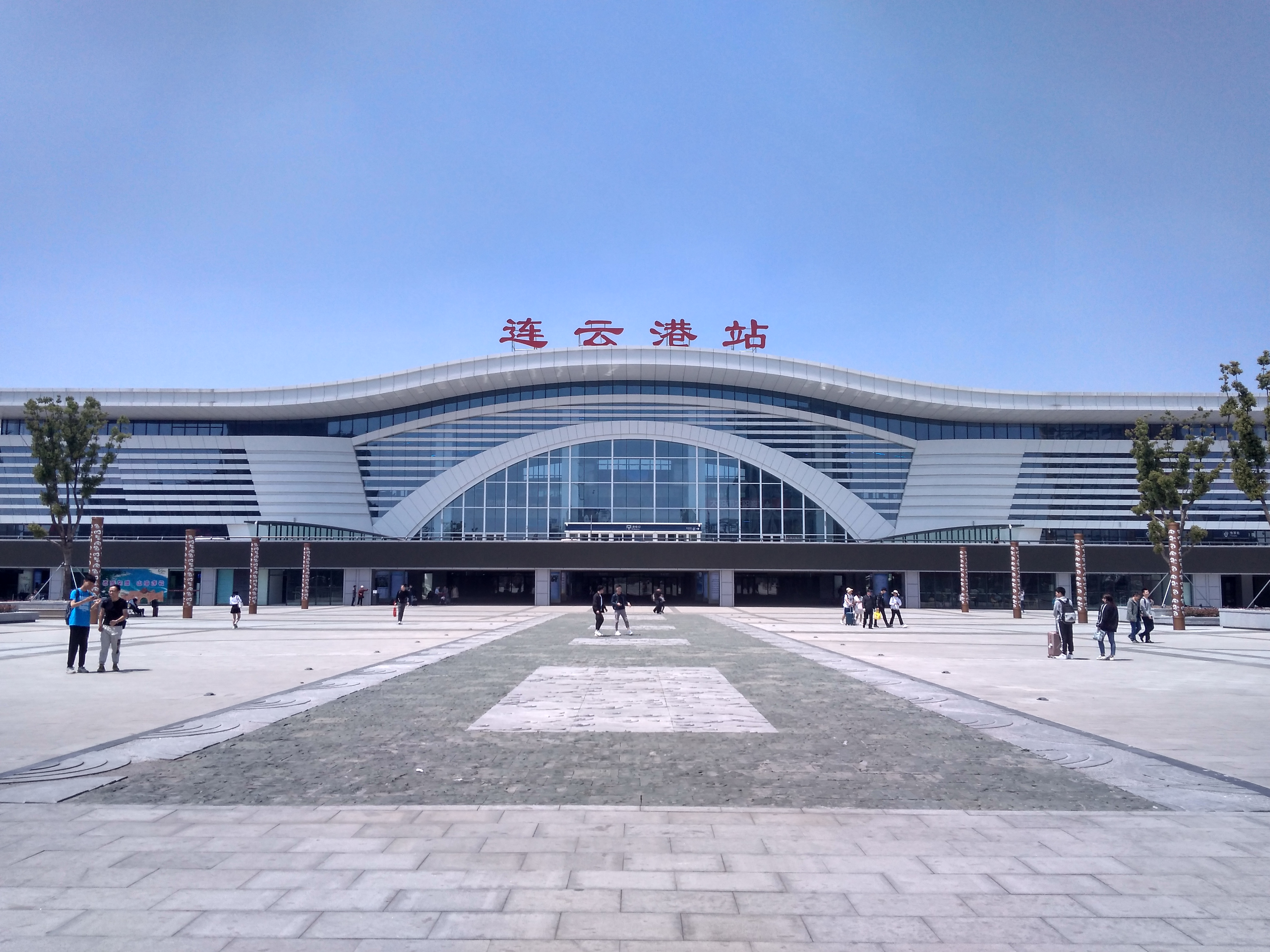
Lianyungang railway station in Haizhou

Lianyungang is the eastern end of the Longhai Railway (formerly the Lunghai Railway), connecting it with Lanzhou in central China. As a major arterial east–west railway in China, it runs from Lianyungang to Lanzhou, Gansu through the provinces of Jiangsu, Anhui, Henan, Shaanxi, and Gansu, covering a total length of 1,759 km.

Lianyungang-Xuzhou High speed Railway, connecting Lianyungang and the important provincial transportation hub of Xuzhou, is under construction. The length of this railway is 180 km (110 mi) and the speed standard is 350 km/h (220 mph).

Qingdao-Yancheng High speed Railway, part of China's Coastal High-speed Railway, goes through Lianyungang. The length of this railway is 429 km and the speed standard is 200 km/h.

Lianyungang-Nanjing/Zhenjiang High speed Railway connects Lianyungang and the provincial capital, Nanjing. The length of this railway is 300 km (190 mi) and the speed standard is 250 km/h (160 mph).

=== Expressway ===
Lianyungang is the intersection of G15 Shenyang–Haikou Expressway, G25 Changchun–Shenzhen Expressway and G30 Lianyungang–Khorgas Expressway.

=== Port ===
Lianyungang port is among the 10 largest ports in China and the 30 largest port in the world. The cargo throughput of Lianyungang port is 210 million ton/year (2015). The container throughput is 5 million TEU/year (2015). The port is part of the Maritime Silk Road that runs from the Chinese coast to the south via Singapore towards the southern tip of India, to Mombasa, then through the Suez Canal to the Mediterranean with its connections to Central and Eastern Europe. Lianyungang Port connects the Yangtze River Delta to the south, the Bohai Bay to the north, Northeast Asia to the east across the sea, the central and western parts of the country to the west, and direct access to Central Asia and Europe. It is at the intersection of east–west communication and sea-land transformation. It is the eastern bridgehead and the new Eurasian Continental Bridge. It is one of the three main ports in my country's coastal major ports, regional central ports and the Yangtze River Delta port group.

== Notable people ==
- Chen Qinggang (born 1966), journalist and newspaper bureau chief
- Zhong Huijuan (born 1961), pharmaceutical entrepreneur
- He Bingjiao (born 1997), Chinese badminton player

== Sister Cities ==
- Bishkek, Kyrgyzstan
- Greater Geelong, Australia
- Mokpo, South Korea
- Napier, New Zealand
- Sabadell, Spain
- Saga, Japan
- Sakai, Japan
- Volzhsky, Russia

== See also ==
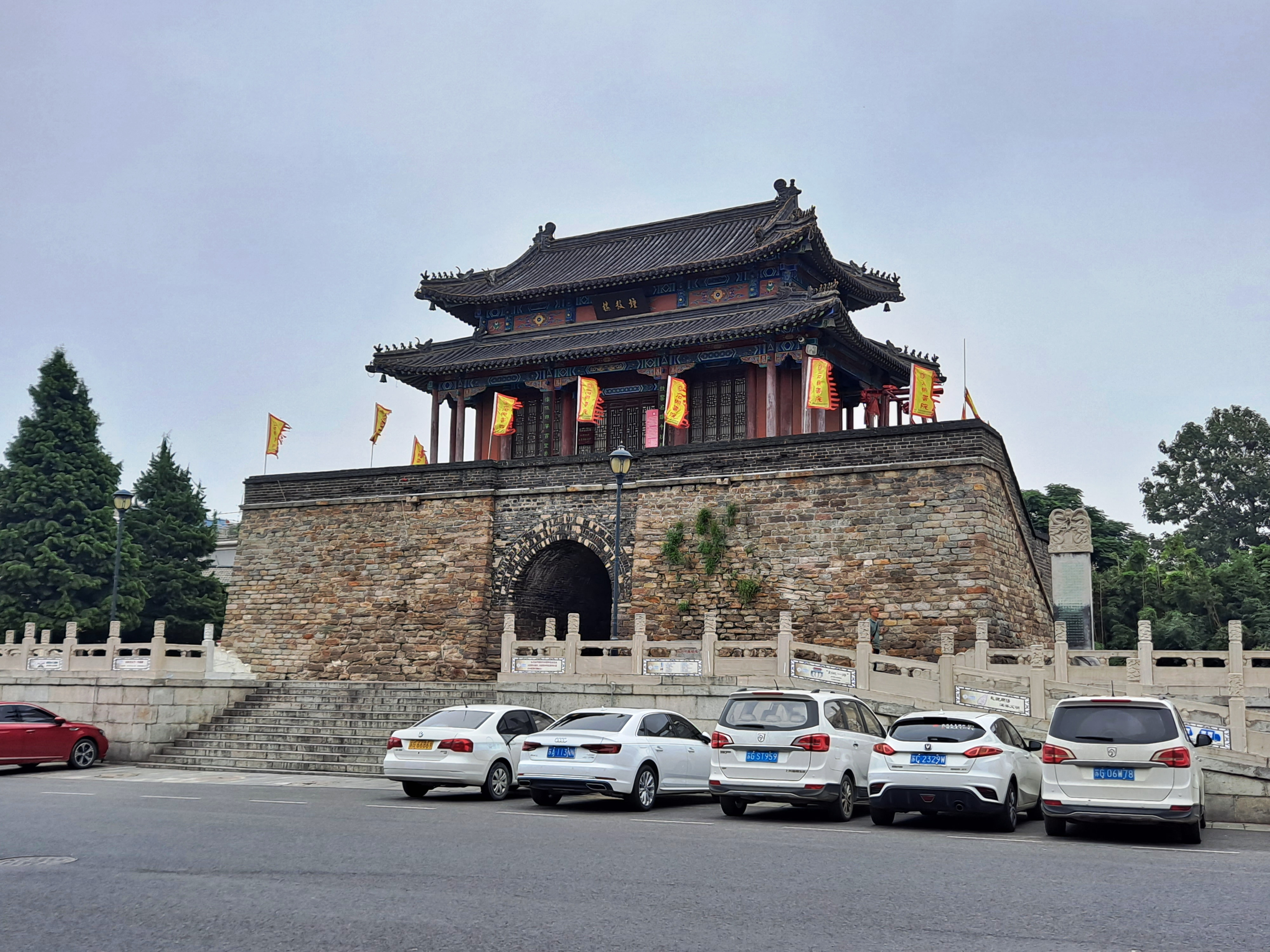
Drum Tower of Haizhou, the old town of Lianyungang

- List of twin towns and sister cities in China
- Chinese frigate Lianyungang (522)
