= Jiangdu, Yangzhou =

Jiangdu 江都区 Kiangtu
- District
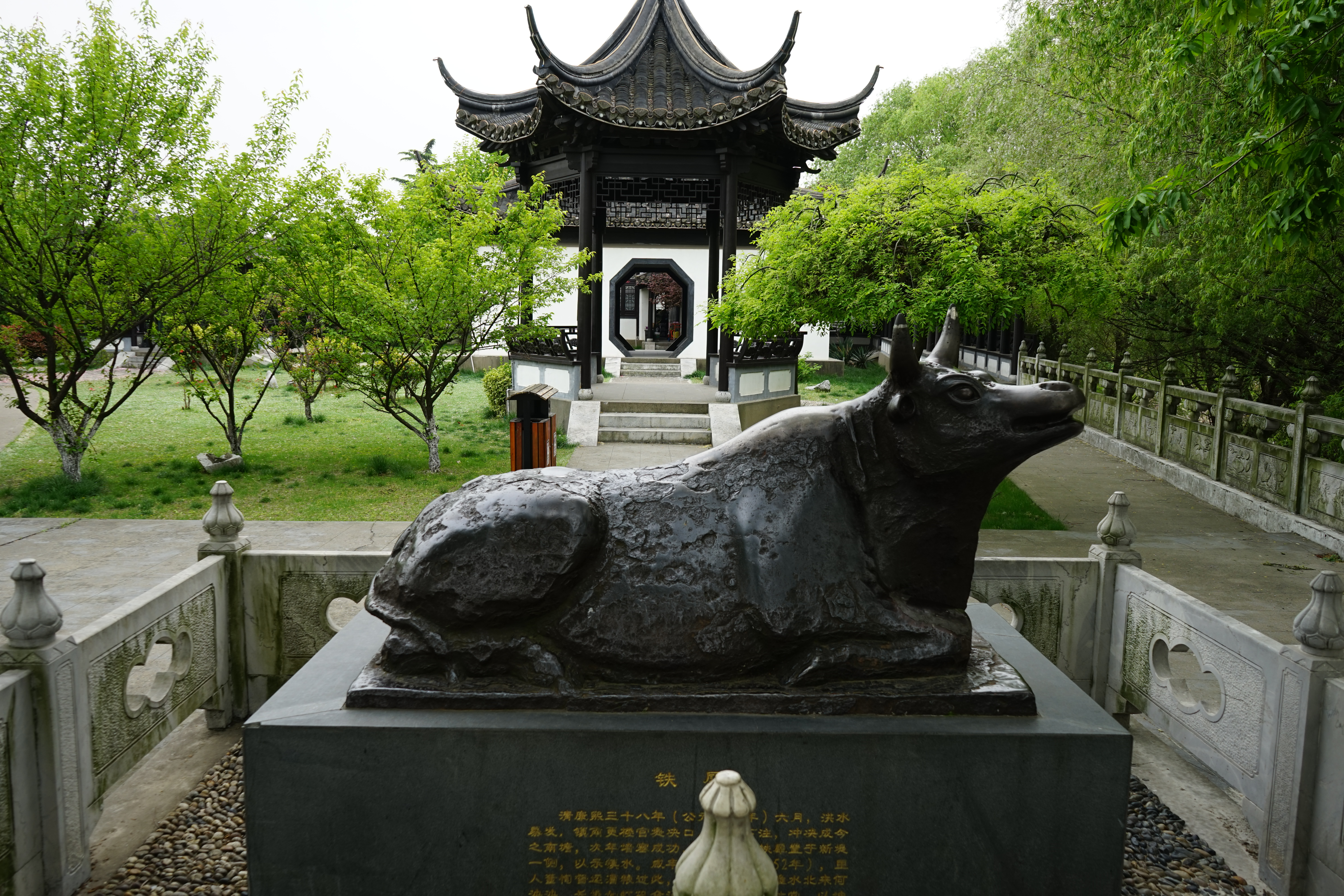
- An iron rhinoceros statue in Shaobo

- Location in Jiangsu
- Coordinates: 32°32′46″N 119°41′02″E
- Country: People's Republic of China
- Province: Jiangsu
- Prefecture-level city: Yangzhou

Area
  - Total: 1,518.7798 km^{2} (586.4042 sq mi)
  - Land: 1,329.9025 km^{2} (513.4782 sq mi)
  - Water: 188.8773 km^{2} (72.9259 sq mi)

Population (2020)
  - Total: 926,577
  - Density: 696.726/km^{2} (1,804.51/sq mi)
- Time zone: UTC+8 (China Standard)

Jiangdu (Chinese: 江都区; pinyin: Jiāngdū Qū; historically known as Kiangtu) is one of three districts of Yangzhou, Jiangsu province, China. The district spans an area of 1,518.78 square kilometres (586.40 mi^{2}), and as of November 1, 2020, has 926,577 inhabitants. Formerly a county, Jiangdu became a district in July 1994.

Yangzhou Taizhou Airport, which serves the cities of Yangzhou and Taizhou, is located in the town of Dinggou, in Jiangdu District.

== Toponymy ==
The district's name in Chinese literally means "river capital", and refers to when Xiang Yu used the area as the capital of the Western Chu.

== History ==
Human agricultural production in the area has been dated back to approximately five to six thousand years ago, according to government sources. During the Spring and Autumn period, it belonged to the State of Wu.

Following the Qin's wars of unification, the dynasty administered the area of present-day Jiangdu District as part of Guangling County. However, shortly after, Xiang Yu, leader of the rebellious Western Chu, established Jiangdu as his capital city.

In 153 BCE, the Western Han organized Jiangdu as its own county, under the administration of the Guangling Commandery. During the Eastern Han period, Guangling Commandery Grand Administrator Zhang Gang built a large canal to divert water from a lake and irrigate Jiangdu County.

During the Three Kingdoms period, the county belonged to the Wu Kingdom, and was later abolished.

The Western Jin re-established Jiangdu County, but during the Eastern Jin it was once again abolished, and merged into Yu County (simplified Chinese: 舆县; traditional Chinese: 輿縣). Later on in the Eastern Jin period, Emperor Mu of Jin re-established Jiangdu County.

During the last years of the Sui dynasty, Emperor Yang of Sui fled to Jiangdu to escape from rebellions in the north, and stayed until he was murdered in a coup.

In December 1937, as part of the Japanese Invasion of China, most of the county was occupied by Japanese forces, exiling the Nationalist government to the county's rural areas. Communist resistance to the occupation of Jiangdu County began in July 1940.

In November 1950, Gao Feng, the local communist party secretary, organized a large rally at the Fairy Temple for the purpose of denouncing local landlords. At they rally, PLA soldiers executed two men, aged about 80 and 30, respectively, with gunshots to the head for "refus[ing] to reform themselves".

In July 1994, Jiangdu County was abolished, and re-organized as a county-level city.

Jiangdu remained a county-level city under the administration of Yangzhou until November 2011, when it was converted into a district.

== Geography ==
Jiangdu District is located within east of Yangzhou, in Jiangsu province. To its east, it is border by Gaogang District, Hailing District, and Jiangyan District, all in the neighboring prefecture-level city of Taizhou. Jiangdu is bound by the Yangtze River to the south, Guangling District to the west, and the county-level cities of Gaoyou and Xinghua to the north.

The area of Jiangdu District is very flat, reaching a maximum elevation of just 9.9 metres (32 ft) above sea level. The district is home to many rivers and lakes, and water accounts for 14.2% of the district's total area. 20.7% of the district is forested.

== Climate ==
Climate data for Jiangdu District, elevation 5 m (16 ft), (1991–2020 normals, extremes 1981–present)
Month	Jan	Feb	Mar	Apr	May	Jun	Jul	Aug	Sep	Oct	Nov	Dec	Year
Record high °C (°F)	21.4 (70.5)	27.0 (80.6)	34.1 (93.4)	33.8 (92.8)	36.7 (98.1)	37.5 (99.5)	39.0 (102.2)	40.7 (105.3)	37.6 (99.7)	32.6 (90.7)	28.8 (83.8)	22.6 (72.7)	40.7 (105.3)
Mean daily maximum °C (°F)	7.1 (44.8)	9.7 (49.5)	14.7 (58.5)	21.0 (69.8)	26.3 (79.3)	29.2 (84.6)	32.2 (90.0)	31.7 (89.1)	27.8 (82.0)	22.8 (73.0)	16.5 (61.7)	9.7 (49.5)	20.7 (69.3)
Daily mean °C (°F)	2.7 (36.9)	5.0 (41.0)	9.6 (49.3)	15.6 (60.1)	21.0 (69.8)	24.7 (76.5)	28.1 (82.6)	27.5 (81.5)	23.2 (73.8)	17.6 (63.7)	11.4 (52.5)	5.0 (41.0)	15.9 (60.7)
Mean daily minimum °C (°F)	−0.6 (30.9)	1.3 (34.3)	5.3 (41.5)	10.8 (51.4)	16.4 (61.5)	20.9 (69.6)	24.9 (76.8)	24.4 (75.9)	19.7 (67.5)	13.6 (56.5)	7.4 (45.3)	1.3 (34.3)	12.1 (53.8)
Record low °C (°F)	−10.9 (12.4)	−10.4 (13.3)	−5.4 (22.3)	−1.1 (30.0)	7.0 (44.6)	12.3 (54.1)	17.9 (64.2)	18.1 (64.6)	10.2 (50.4)	1.3 (34.3)	−4.3 (24.3)	−11.4 (11.5)	−11.4 (11.5)
Average precipitation mm (inches)	48.5 (1.91)	48.4 (1.91)	74.2 (2.92)	69.2 (2.72)	83.4 (3.28)	161.6 (6.36)	213.7 (8.41)	152.0 (5.98)	75.2 (2.96)	54.1 (2.13)	51.9 (2.04)	36.0 (1.42)	1,068.2 (42.04)
Average precipitation days (≥ 0.1 mm)	8.4	8.7	9.9	9.3	9.3	10.7	13.0	12.3	8.4	7.3	7.8	6.7	111.8
Average snowy days	3.5	2.5	1.0	0.1	0	0	0	0	0	0	0.3	1.1	8.5
Average relative humidity (%)	73	74	68	69	70	75	80	81	81	76	75	72	75
Mean monthly sunshine hours	126.4	122.7	152.5	174.6	180.0	138.2	166.0	177.9	154.1	161.2	139.3	135.9	1,828.8
Percentage possible sunshine	40	39	41	45	42	32	38	44	42	46	45	44	42
Source: China Meteorological Administration all-time extreme temperature all-time January high

== Administrative divisions ==
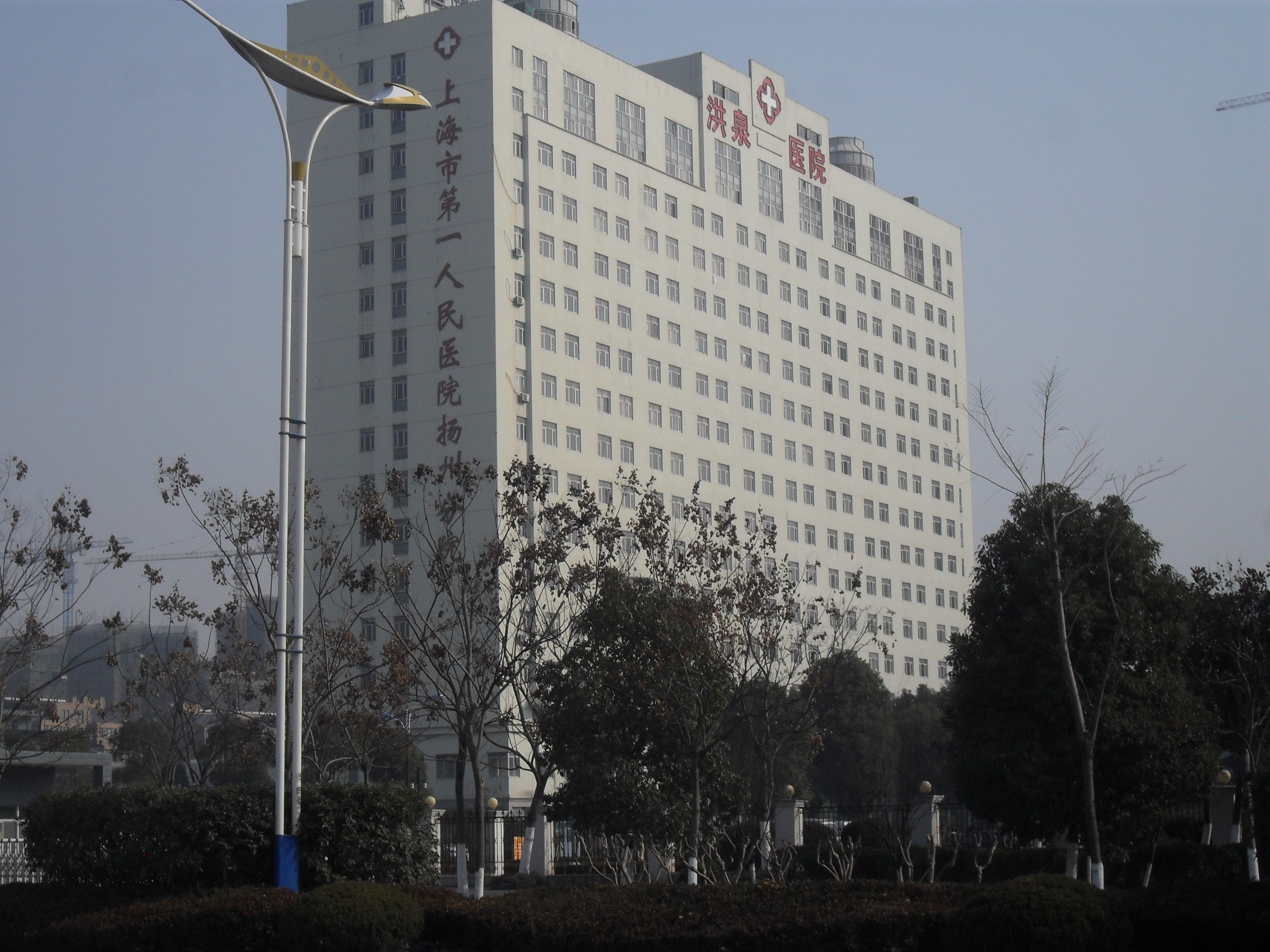
Hongquan Hospital

As of 2020, Jiangdu District administers 13 towns and 1 township-level farm. These divisions then in turn administer 65 residential communities and 263 administrative villages.

- Xiannü (Chinese: 仙女镇)
- Xiaoji (Chinese: 小纪镇)
- Wujian (Chinese: 武坚镇)
- Fanchuan (Chinese: 樊川镇)
- Zhenwu (Chinese: 真武镇)
- Yiling (Chinese: 宜陵镇)
- Dinggou (Chinese: 丁沟镇)
- Goucun (Chinese: 郭村镇)
- Shaobo (Chinese: 邵伯镇)
- Dinghuo (Chinese: 丁伙镇)
- Daqiao
- Wuqiao (Chinese: 吴桥镇)
- Putou (Chinese: 浦头镇)
- Jiangsu Lixin Farm (Chinese: 江苏省立新农场)

== Tourism ==
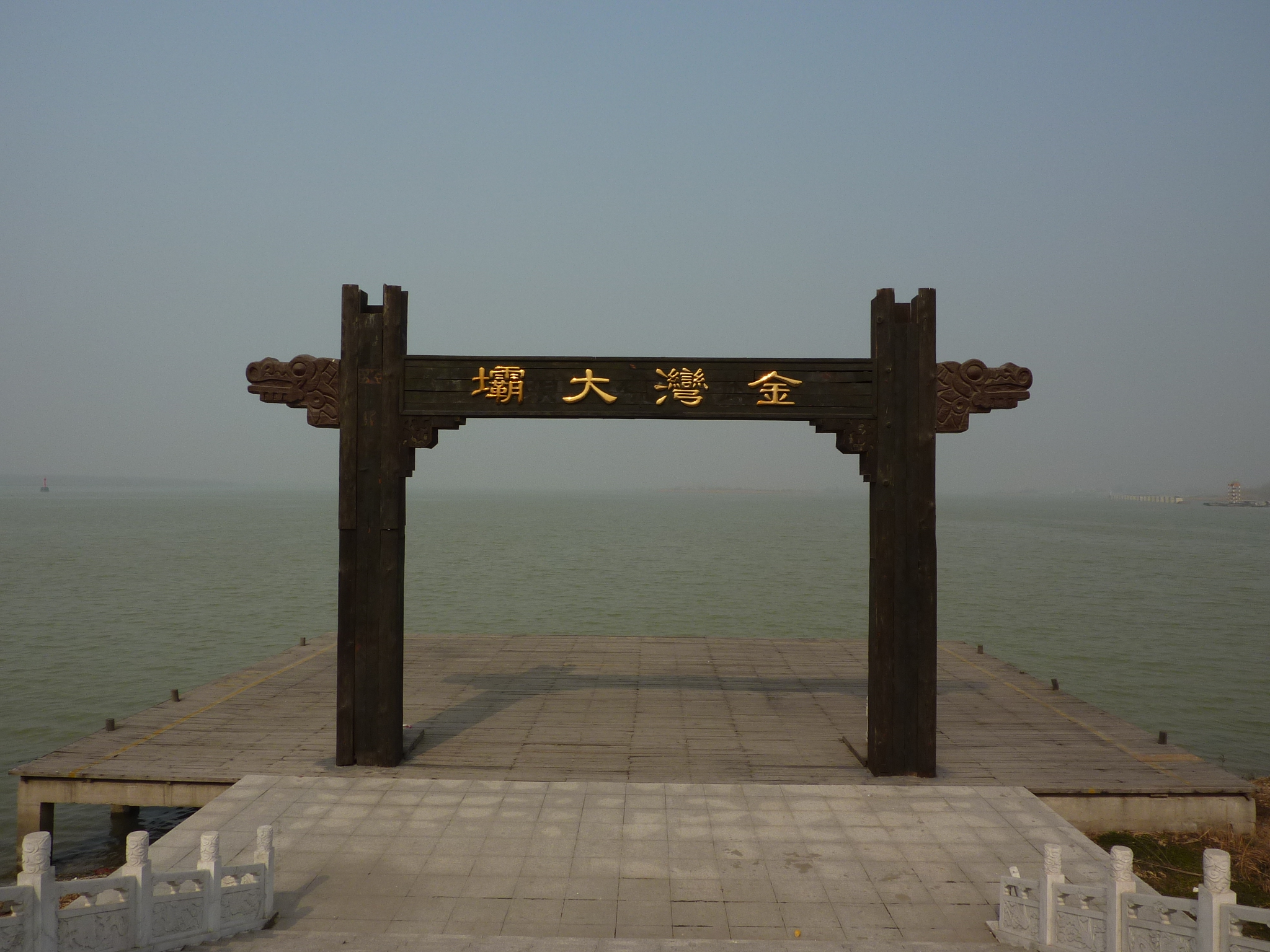
A view of Shaobo Lake

Major tourist spots include Shaobo Lake, Luyang Lake, Kaiyuan Temple (Chinese: 开元寺), and the former residence of Communist revolutionary Xu Xiaoxuan.

== Notable people ==
- Gu Tuhe, Qing dynasty poet and politician
- Shi Shenyi, Qing dynasty poet and scholar
- Dong Xun, Qing dynasty politician and diplomat
- Zhang Liangui, Qing dynasty politician
- Jiang Shixi, Qing dynasty and Republic of China doctor and scholar
- Jiang Shangqing, Communist revolutionary
- Xu Xiaoxuan, Communist revolutionary
- Wang Shaotang, Yangzhou pinghua performer
- Shu Xingbei, physicist and professor
- Xie Feng, diplomat and current Chinese Ambassador to the United States
- Ma Zupeng, political figure and government official
