= Shengao =

Shengao 沈高镇
- Town
- Interactive map of Shengao
- Coordinates: 32°35′04″N 120°08′01″E
- Country: People's Republic of China
- Province: Jiangsu
- Prefecture-level city: Taizhou
- District: Jiangyan

Government
  - CPC Secretary: Chen Zhonghua (陈中华)

Area
  - Total: 56 km^{2} (22 sq mi)
- Elevation: 4 m (13 ft)

Population
  - Total: 41,000
  - Density: 730/km^{2} (1,900/sq mi)
- Time zone: UTC+8 (China Standard)
- Postal code: 225538
- Area code: 0523

Shengao (Chinese: 沈高; pinyin: Shéngāo) is a town in Jiangyan District, Taizhou, south-central Jiangsu province, China. It is called the hometown of fish and rice because of the high quality of the fish and rice production in the town. It is among the first of the opening cities designated by the State Council of China.

== Location ==
Shengao town is located just north of the core of Jiangyan District. The Nanjing-Qidong railway and Yangzhou Canal pass through the town from east to west. The Nanjing-Yancheng highway and Jiangyan-Qingtong river also go through the town from south-to-north, providing a very good transportation network.

== Economy ==
Shengao is famous for its 'green agriculture' and scenery. Organic food, such as vegetables, fish, shrimps, and crabs are the main output in its agriculture sector. Some of the well-known brands are 'Heheng' rice=, 'Santai' pickles, and 'Ruchun' preserved duck eggs. There are 10 categories of food qualified to use the national 'Green Food' symbol, and most of these are products of Jiangsu province.

Industry in Shengao is developing.

In June 1995, when Jiang Chunyun, vice-chairman of the Standing Committee of the Ninth National People's Congress (NPC) visited Shengao, he pointed out Shengao is an example of modern agriculture, and the experience of developing of agriculture is very convincing and has a say in the national wide. Shengao has a total GDP 38.1 million and a tax income 1.8 million yuan. This year, Shengao was named a good example of Dainan and Zhangguo style towns by the Secretary General and mayor of Taizhou.

== Awards ==
In 1990, Heheng village in Jiangyan city was awarded Global 500 Roll of Honor by the United Nations Environment Programme (UNEP) because of its success in protecting the environment while increasing the grain yield and its wide use of marsh biogas ponds.

== Villages ==
- Shengao (Chinese: 沈高)
- Dantang (Chinese: 单塘)
- Lianmeng (Chinese: 联盟)
- Wanzhong (Chinese: 万众)
- Guanzhuang (Chinese: 官庄)
- Jiahe (Chinese: 夹河)
- Shuangxing (Chinese: 双星)
- Xiazhu (Chinese: 夏朱)
- Heheng (Chinese: 河横)
- Fengzhuang (Chinese: 冯庄)
- Tianmin (Chinese: 天民)
- Houbao (Chinese: 后堡)
- Huayang (Chinese: 华杨)
- Xiabei (Chinese: 夏北): Seat of Townhall.
- Zhaoxing (Chinese: 超幸)

Postal Code: 225538

== Companies ==
- Jiangyan Hengyuan Clothing Corp (姜堰市恒源布厂)
- Jiangyan Huanqiu Auto Corp (姜堰市环球汽车电器厂)
- Jiangsu Kangjian Medical Instrument Ltd (江苏康健医疗用品有限公司, 超幸村, +86-523-8651752)
- Jiangyan Xinkang Medical Instrument Ltd (姜堰市新康医疗器械有限公司)
- 江苏百灵农化有限公司
- 江苏动物药品厂有限公司
- 江苏新华袜厂
- 泰州市华隆针织有限公司
- 江苏金刚针织有限公司
- 姜堰市新型纺织有限公司
- Jiangsu Santai Pickle and Researve Food Ltd (江苏三泰酱菜有限公司, 沈高村, +86-523-8651010)
- 姜堰市鑫生园食品有限公司
- 姜堰市明珠米厂
- 姜堰市明牛乳业有限公司
- 泰州正荣特种禽业发展有限公司
- 泰州市河横家禽育种有限公司

== Schools ==
- Shengao Middle School (沈高中学)
- Shengao Career Training High School
