= Li Dequn =

Chinese material scientist (1945–2022)

- 李德群
- Born: 7 August 1945; Tai County, Jiangsu, China
- Died: 5 September 2022 (aged 77); Wuhan, Hubei, China
- Education: Tsinghua University; Huazhong University of Science and Technology
- Scientific career
- Fields: Material science
- Workplaces: Huazhong University of Science and Technology

Li Dequn (Chinese: 李德群; pinyin: Lǐ Déqún; 7 August 1945 – 5 September 2022) was a Chinese material scientist who was a professor at Huazhong University of Science and Technology, and an academician of the Chinese Academy of Engineering.

== Biography ==
Li was born in Tai County (now Jiangyan District of Taizhou), Jiangsu, on 7 August 1945. Both his cousins Li Deyi and Li Deren are also academicians of the Chinese Academy of Engineering.

In 1963, he was admitted to Tsinghua University, majoring in metal hot working process and equipment. After graduating in 1968, he was assigned to Lingwu Farm Tractor Repair Factory in northwest China's Ningxia Hui Autonomous Region. In 1974, he was transferred to Qianjiang Machinery Factory in central China's Hubei and appointed leader of its Tooling Technology Group. After resumption of college entrance examination, in 1978, he entered Huazhong Institute of Technology (now Huazhong University of Science and Technology), and taught there after graduation. In 1986, he went to Cornell University in the United States to engage in research on computer simulation technology of injection mold forming process, and developed commercial two-dimensional cooling system software in AC-Tech company. He returned to China in 1986 and continued to teach at the Central China University of Science and Engineering (now Huazhong University of Science and Technology). He was promoted to associate professor in 1987 and to full professor in 1991. From January 1995 to December 1995, he was a visiting scholar at the Material Processing Department of Nanyang Technological University. He became dean of the School of Materials (now School of Materials Science and Engineering) in 2001, and served until 2006.

On 5 September 2022, he died from an illness in Wuhan, Hubei, at the age of 77.

== Honours and awards ==
- 2002 State Science and Technology Progress Award (Second Class) for the development and application of plastic injection molding process simulation system
- 2007 State Science and Technology Progress Award (Second Class) for the simulation technology of material forming process and its application
- 2010 State Natural Science Award (Second Class) for the study on composite structure, injection molding process and mechanical failure behavior of plastics
- 2015 Member of the Chinese Academy of Engineering (CAE)
- 2018 State Science and Technology Progress Award (Second Class) for the preparation and shape control technology of mold (core) laser sintering materials for integral casting of complex parts
- 2019 State Science and Technology Progress Award (Second Class) for the intelligent control technology and equipment for plastic injection molding process
