= Zhi Bingyi =

Chinese scientist

- 支秉彝
- Born: 19 September 1911; Taizhou County, Jiangsu, Qing China
- Died: 24 July 1993 (aged 81); Shanghai, China
- Education: Zhejiang University; Leipzig University
- Scientific career
- Fields: Telecommunications engineering Measuring instrument Chinese character encoding
- Workplaces: Shanghai Instrument Research Institute

Zhi Bingyi (Chinese: 支秉彝; pinyin: Zhī Bǐngyí; 19 September 1911 – 24 July 1993) was a Chinese scientist in the fields of telecommunications engineering, measuring instrument and Chinese character encoding. He was one of the earliest figures in Chinese history to have contributed to the science of characters computer processing. He has been hailed by many as "Chinese characters information processing pioneer". He was an academician of the Chinese Academy of Sciences.

== Biography ==
Zhi was born into a highly educated family in Taizhou County, Jiangsu, on 19 September 1911, while ancestral home in Zhenjiang. He secondary studied at Taizhou High School. In 1931, he was accepted to Zhejiang University, where he majored in the Department of Electrical Engineering. In 1934, he pursued advanced studies in Germany, earning a doctor's degree in natural science from Leipzig University in 1944. Zhi became fluent in German and married a German woman.

He returned to China in 1946 and that same year was recruited by the Central Industrial Laboratory (中央工业试验所) as an engineer, as well as director of electronic laboratory. From 1947 to 1951, he was professor at Zhejiang University, Tongji University and Shanghai Aviation College. He also became a member of the Chinese Academy of Sciences.

In 1951, he founded the Yellow River Science and Technology Instrument Factory (黄河理工仪器厂), which was merged into Shanghai Electric Meter Factory (上海电表厂) in 1954. After the institutional reform, he served as deputy chief engineer and director of central laboratory. In 1957, he engaged in the research on aging treatment of manganin resistance elements and solved the quality problem of domestic manganin. He also participated in the development of the first 5-bit DC digital voltmeter in China in the 1960s. In 1964, he was transferred to the Shanghai Institute of Electrical Instruments (上海电工仪器研究所; later reshuffled as Shanghai Instrument Research Institute 上海仪器仪表研究所), where he successively served as chief engineer, deputy director, director, and honorary director.

Zhi's time abroad in Nazi-controlled Germany made him politically suspect in the eyes of some. In 1966, the Cultural Revolution broke out, two years later, he was denounced as a "reactionary academic authority" and suffered political persecution. During that time, he "worked on his ideas about a Chinese computer language in a squalid prison cell during the Cultural Revolution, writing his calculations on a teacup after his guards took away even his toilet paper." In September 1969, he was released from prison to house arrest. He was supervised to sweep the floor, clean the lathe, and then worked as a waste warehouse keeper. In his spare time, he used six years to invent the coding method of Jian Zi Shi Ma (见字识码; 'On-Sight Coding'), which made a great contribution to Chinese character coding and Chinese character information processing.

Zhi wished for an intuitive but unique alphabetic code for Chinese characters. Zhi's predecessors, i.e., Bismarck Doo, Wang Yunwu, and Lin Yutang preferred a shape-based approach to encoding, examining a character's strokes and components and grouping them into categories. However, the official adoption of pinyin made the phonetic approach a national policy. Zhi was able to combine pinyin and a shape-based approach to index characters by their components, using the first letter of each component's pinyin spelling.

He joined the Communist Party in May 1991.

On 24 July 1993, he died of illness in Shanghai, aged 81.

== Honours and awards ==
- 1980 Chinese Academy of Sciences (CAS)
