= Tsien Tsuen-hsuin =

Chinese-American sinologist and librarian (1910–2015)

- 錢存訓
- Born: 11 January 1910; Taizhou, Jiangsu, Qing Empire
- Died: 9 April 2015 (aged 105); Chicago, Illinois, United States
- Citizenship: American
- Education: University of Nanking (BA); University of Chicago (MA, PhD)
- Spouse: Hsu Wen-ching (m. 1936; died 2008)
- Children: 3
- Scientific career
- Fields: Chinese bibliography, Library science, history
- Workplaces: University of Chicago (1947–78)

Chinese name
- Traditional Chinese: 錢存訓
- Simplified Chinese: 钱存训
- Hanyu Pinyin: Qián Cúnxùn
Transcriptions
Standard Mandarin
- Hanyu Pinyin: Qián Cúnxùn
- Gwoyeu Romatzyh: Chyan Tswenshiunn
- Wade–Giles: Ch'ien^{2} Ts'un^{2}-hsün^{4}
- IPA: [tɕʰjɛ̌n tsʰwə̌nɕŷn]
Wu
- Romanization: Zi Zən-shün

Tsien Tsuen-hsuin (Chinese: 錢存訓; pinyin: Qián Cúnxùn; 11 January 1910 – 9 April 2015), also known as T.H. Tsien, was a Chinese-American bibliographer, librarian, and sinologist who served as a professor of Chinese literature and library science at the University of Chicago Graduate Library School, and was curator of its East Asian Library from 1949 to 1978. He is known for studies of the history of the Chinese book, Chinese bibliography, paleography, and science and technology, especially the history of paper and printing in China, notably Paper and Printing, Volume 5 Pt 1 of British biochemist and sinologist Joseph Needham's Science and Civilisation in China. He is also known for risking his life to smuggle tens of thousands of rare books outside of Japanese-occupied China during World War II.

== Early life ==
Tsien was born on January 11, 1910 (Note: Tsien's date of birth is sometimes given as December 1, 1909, which stems from an alternative rendering of his birth date according to the Chinese calendar; Tsien occasionally used this date during his life.) in Taixian (modern Taizhou), Jiangsu Province, to a prominent family that descended from King Qian Liu, founder of the Wuyue kingdom. He began the memoir of his life by saying "I was born during the reign of the last Emperor of the Imperial Dynasty." His father Qian Weizhen (錢慰貞; 钱慰贞) was a prominent scholar of Buddhism, and his great grandfather Qian Guisen (錢桂森; 钱桂森) was a member of the Hanlin Academy.

Tsien began his education with a private tutor in 1916, and then entered Taixian No. 2 Senior Elementary School. He became active in political agitation when he was a student at Huaidong High School (now Taizhou High School). After graduating in 1925, he joined the "Youth Society" in Taizhou and edited its journal. Due to their political activities, Tsien and his colleagues were arrested by the Jiangsu warlord Sun Chuanfang. His family managed to secure his release, but the principal of Huaidong High School was executed. Unable to remain in Taizhou, he left for Nanking (Nanjing) and never returned to his hometown again. In 1927, he enlisted in the army to take part in the Northern Expedition's military campaign to unite China under the Nationalist government.

== Career and contributions ==
Tsien entered University of Nanking in 1928 and graduated in 1932 with a degree in history and a minor in library science. He went on to the Jiaotong University Library in Shanghai. He then worked at the Nanking branch of the National Library. In 1936, he married Hsu Wen-chin. In early 1937, the National Library transferred him to the Shanghai branch to curate a large group of rare books and manuscripts which the government had sent there in 1931 when the Japanese army had invaded Manchuria.

In 1941, war with the United States meant that this group of books and manuscripts would no longer be safe even in Shanghai. Tsien packed some 30,000 of them for shipment to the United States for safekeeping. In order to evade Japanese confiscation, he marked them as new books and waited to ship them in small groups at times when he knew a friendly Chinese customs worker was on duty. He later recalled "had the Japanese occupying forces discovered this subterfuge, and that I had personally been responsible in this task, I would most likely have been executed." The Library of Congress microfilmed the collection to make it widely available.

After the end of World War II, Tsien was sent to the United States in 1947 to manage the repatriation of these volumes. However, the Chinese Civil War precluded shipping the books and his own return to China. In the mid-1960s, the United States gave the books to Taiwan, where the Republic of China government had retreated after losing the civil war. They are currently at the National Palace Museum in Taipei.

Herrlee Glessner Creel, professor of Chinese at University of Chicago, invited "T.H.", as his friends called him, to catalog the roughly 100,000 Chinese books in the collection Creel had built. At Creel's suggestion, Tsien enrolled in the University of Chicago Graduate Library School, and soon was curator of the Far Eastern Library and professorial lecturer in Chinese literature in the Department of Oriental Languages and Literature. Tsien also earned Masters and Doctoral degrees in the Library School. He received a Ph.D. at Chicago in 1957; his dissertation was published by the University of Chicago Press in 1962 as Written on Bamboo and Silk:The Beginnings of Chinese Books and Inscriptions.

Tsien was especially concerned to build relations of cooperation between China and other countries. His master's thesis, "Western Impact on China Through Translation," was published as an article in 1954, and the 1869 donation of books by the emperor in Beijing to the Library of Congress was the subject of a 1964 article. His concern with scholarly communication between East and West led him to translate his English writings into Chinese and his Chinese writings into English.

Another major activity was encouraging the development of Chinese collections outside China and the promotion of librarianship as a profession. Many Chinese librarians received their training under his example and instruction, including ones who gained leading positions at Harvard-Yenching Library, Princeton University's Gest Library, and the Library of Congress.

In his nineties Tsien helped with the revision and proofreading for the 2nd edition of his Written on Bamboo and Silk, which appeared in 2004, and arranged for it to be translated into Chinese.

Tsien died on April 9, 2015, in Chicago, at the age of 105.

== Family ==
Tsien's wife, Wen-ching Hsu (Chinese: 许文锦, 1916-2008), was one of the earliest teachers of Chinese at University of Chicago. She died in 2008. The couple had three daughters, Ginger Tsien (1936-2008), Mary Tsien Dunkel, and Gloria Tsien (b. 1940). Tsien's nephew, Xiaowen Qian, is an assistant to the curator for the East Asian Collection of University of Chicago.

== Honors and awards ==
Tsien received a Distinguished Alumni Award from University of Chicago and also from Nanjing University. The National Library of China gave him the Distinguished Service Award in 1999. In 2007, Nanjing University established the T. H. Tsien Library in his honor. He donated thousands of books from his own collection to the library.

== Selected publications in English ==
- ——— (1952). "A History of Bibliographic Classification in China". The Library Quarterly. 22 (4): 307–324. doi:10.1086/617916. JSTOR 4304148. S2CID 144623794.
- ——— (1954). "Western Impact on China through Translation". The Far Eastern Quarterly. 13 (3): 305–327. doi:10.2307/2942281. JSTOR 2942281. S2CID 156037140.
- ———; with Nunn, G. Raymond (1959). Far Eastern Resources in American Libraries. [Chicago]: [University of Chicago].
- ——— (1964). "First Chinese-American Exchange of Publications". Harvard Journal of Asiatic Studies. 25: 19–30. doi:10.2307/2718337. JSTOR 2718337.
- ——— (1975), "Current Status of East Asian Collections in American Libraries" (PDF), Journal of Asian Studies
- ——— (1985). Science and Civilisation in China: Volume 5, Chemistry and Chemical Technology, Part 1, Paper and Printing. Cambridge: Cambridge University Press. ISBN 9780521086905.
- ——— (2011). Collected Writings on Chinese Culture. Chinese University Press. ISBN 978-9629964221.
- ——— (2013). Written on Bamboo and Silk : The Beginnings of Chinese Books and Inscriptions. University of Chicago Press. ISBN 9780226814162. 2nd edition, with Edward Shaughnessy.
