= Gaogang =

Gaogang may refer to:

- Gao Gang, a Chinese politician
- Gaogang, Taizhou, in Jiangsu, China
