= Chen Qianping =

Chinese historian

- 陈谦平
- Born: February 1955 (age 71); Nanjing, Jiangsu, China
- Occupation: Historian

Academic background
- Education: Nanjing University

Academic work
- Discipline: History
- Sub-discipline: Republic of China
- Institutions: Nanjing University

Chinese name
- Traditional Chinese: 陳謙平
- Simplified Chinese: 陈谦平
Transcriptions
Standard Mandarin
- Hanyu Pinyin: Chén Qiānpíng

Chen Qianping (Chinese: 陈谦平; pinyin: Chén Qiānpíng; born February 1955) is a Chinese historian who is a professor and doctoral supervisor at Nanjing University. He is a member of the Academic Advisory Committee of the Chinese Academy of History.

== Biography ==
Chen was born in February 1955 in Nanjing, Jiangsu, while his ancestral home in Jiangdu. After the resumption of college entrance examination, he was accepted to Nanjing University, where he earned a doctor's degree in history in March 2002. He is now a professor and doctoral supervisor at Nanjing University.

== Works ==
- 中华民国史新论 [On the History of the Republic of China] (in Chinese). Beijing: SDX Joint Publishing Company. 2000. ISBN 9787108019967.
- 民国对外关系史论 [On the History of Foreign Relations in the Republic of China (1927-1949)] (in Chinese). Beijing: SDX Joint Publishing Company. 2013. ISBN 9787108041739.
- 翁文灏与抗战档案史料汇编 [Weng Wenhao and the Compilation of Historical Materials of Counter-Japanese War Archives] (in Chinese). Beijing: Social Science Literature Publishing House. 2017. ISBN 9787509798232.
- Zhang Xianwen; Chen Qianping (2017). 中国抗日战争史 [History of Counter-Japanese War in China] (in Chinese). Beijing: Chemical Industry Press. ISBN 9787122295941.
- Chen Qianping; Chen Hongmin (2013). 民国史巨子：张宪文教授学术生涯纪传 [A Great Historian of the Republic of China: Biography of Professor Zhang Xianwen's Academic Career] (in Chinese). Nanjing, Jiangsu: Nanjing University Press. ISBN 9787305121951.
- Chen Qianping; Zhang Lianhong; Zhang Sheng (2000). 中国正面战场 [China's Front Battlefield] (in Chinese). Huaxia Publishing House. ISBN 9787508082233.

== Translations ==
- W．C．Kirby (2019). 海外中国研究·德国与中华民国 [Germany and the Republic of China] (in Chinese). Nanjing, Jiangsu: Jiangsu People's Publishing House. ISBN 9787214044563.
