= Daqiao, Yangzhou =

Daqiao 大桥镇
- Town
- Location in Jiangsu
- Coordinates: 32°22′15″N 119°42′39″E
- Country: People's Republic of China
- Province: Jiangsu
- Prefecture-level city: Yangzhou
- District: Jiangdu District
- Time zone: UTC+8 (China Standard)

Daqiao (simplified Chinese: 大桥; traditional Chinese: 大橋; pinyin: Dàqiáo) is a town in Jiangdu District, Yangzhou, Jiangsu province, China. As of 2018, it has 8 residential communities and 33 villages under its administration.

== See also ==
- List of township-level divisions of Jiangsu
