= Chunlan Group =

Chinese electronics company

Chunlan Group 春兰集团
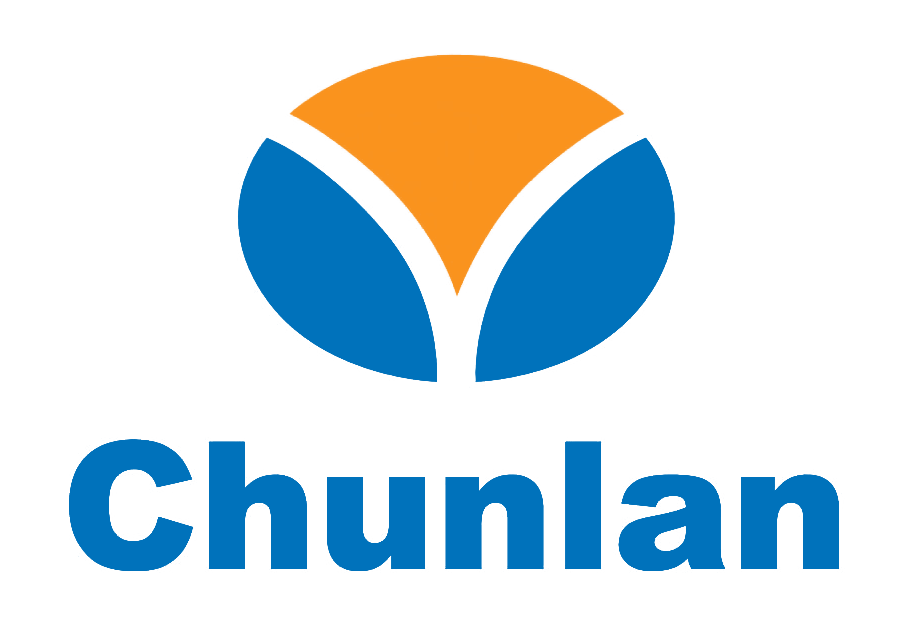
- Industry: Electronics
- Founded: 1985
- Founder: Tao Jianxing
- Headquarters: Taizhou, Jiangsu, China
- Key people: Tao Jianxing, Shao Qihui, Li Hongzhi, Ren Guojun, Zhu Aiqun, Xu Wei, Sunqing, Xu Chengye, Zhang Hongzhi, Tai Baoxi
- Revenue: CN¥172,989,651.31 (2023)
- Total assets: CN¥2,395,415,369.14 (2023)
- Website: https://www.chunlan.com/en/

Chunlan Group Corp (Chinese: 春兰集团公司) is a Chinese corporation with its headquarters at Taizhou, Jiangsu province.

The founder, Tao Jianxing, took over the management of Taizhou Cooling Equipment Factory in 1985, which gradually expanded in the air conditioner market. The current Chunlan Group Corp was founded in 1993, and has been the leading manufacturer of air conditioners in China. Chunlun air conditioners have been exported to the Middle East, Australia, Africa, and South America.

The company currently has expanded into three business areas: electrical appliances, automobiles and new energies.

The name of the corporation is from the noble orchid (Cymbidium goeringii, simplified Chinese: 春兰; traditional Chinese: 春蘭; pinyin: chūn lán).
