= Li Deren =

Topographer from China

- 李德仁
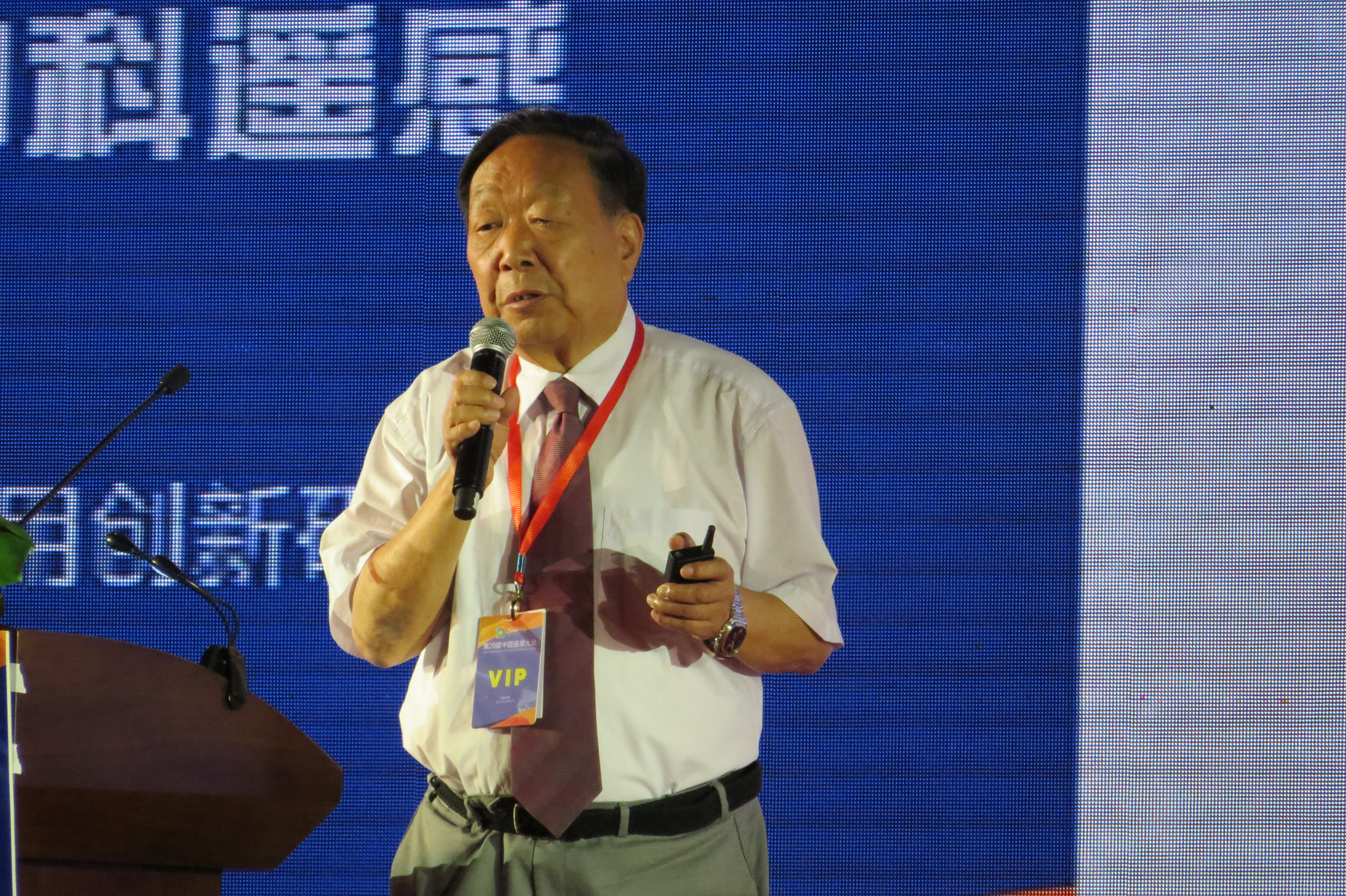
- Li Deren in August 2016
- Born: 31 December 1939 (age 86); Tai County, Jiangsu, China
- Education: Wuhan University; University of Stuttgart
- Spouse: Zhu Yixuan
- Scientific career
- Fields: Photogrammetry and remote sensing
- Workplaces: Wuhan University

Li Deren (Chinese: 李德仁; pinyin: Lǐ Dérén; born 31 December 1939) is a Chinese scientist who is a professor at Wuhan University, a former president of Wuhan University of Surveying and Mapping Technology, and member of the Chinese Academy of Sciences and the Chinese Academy of Engineering.

== Biography ==
Li was born in Tai County, Jiangsu, on 31 December 1939, while his ancestral home in Dantu District of Zhenjiang. His younger brother Li Deyi is an academician of the Chinese Academy of Engineering. His younger cousin brother Li Dequn is also an academician of the Chinese Academy of Engineering.

He attended Taizhou High School. In 1957, he entered the Department of Aeronautical Surveying, Wuhan Institute of Surveying and Mapping (now Wuhan University).

After graduation in 1963, Li was dispatched to the State Bureau of Surveying and Mapping and reassigned to the Shijiazhuang Cement Products Factory in January 1971. In October 1975, he became an engineer at Hebei Provincial Bureau of Surveying and Mapping.

After resuming the college entrance examination 1978, Li did his postgraduate work at Wuhan Institute of Surveying and Mapping. He pursued further studies in Federal Germany, first studying at the University of Bonn in 1982 and then earning a doctor's degree from the University of Stuttgart under the supervision of Friedrich (Fritz) Ackermann in 1985.

Li returned to China in 1985 and continued to teach at Wuhan Institute of Surveying and Mapping. He was promoted to full professor in October 1986. He moved up the ranks to become president in February 1997, a position in which he remained until July 2000. He was recruited as dean of the School of Environment and Spatial informatics, China University of Mining and Technology in February 2012 and professor of the School of Engineering, Peking University in April 2013, respectively.

== Family ==
Li's father named Li Yueru (李月如) and his mother named Hua Shuhui (华淑蕙).

In February 1967, Li married Zhu Yixuan (朱宜萱), daughter of medical scientist Zhu Yubi (朱裕璧).

== Honours and awards ==
- 1991 Member of the Chinese Academy of Sciences (CAS)
- 1994 Member of the Chinese Academy of Engineering (CAE)
- 1999 Member of the International Academy of Eurasian Sciences (IAES)
- 1999 State Science and Technology Progress Award (Second Class) for the GPS Aerial Photogrammetry Technology
- 1999 Science and Technology Progress Award of the Ho Leung Ho Lee Foundation
- 2001 State Science and Technology Progress Award (Second Class) for the Development and Engineering Application of Domestic GIS Basic Software Geostar
- 2007 State Science and Technology Progress Award (Second Class) for the LD2000 Series Mobile Road Measurement System based on 3S Integration Technology and Its Application
- 2012 State Science and Technology Progress Award (Second Class) for the Innovation in Earth Observation Data Processing Technology for the Integration of Heaven and Earth and Its Application in National Emergency Response
- 2018 Fellow of the International Academy of Astronautics
- 2020 State Science and Technology Progress Award (First Class) for the Key Technologies and Applications of High Precision Intelligent Processing for Sky and Ground Remote Sensing Data
- June 2022 Brock Gold Medal Award
- June 2024 National Highest Science and Technology Award
