= Ma Zupeng =

Chinese politician

- Born: March 1926; China
- Died: June 23, 2024; Beijing, China
- Occupation: a prominent political figure

Ma Zupeng (Chinese: 马祖彭, March 1926, Jiangdu, Jiangsu Province – June 23, 2024) was a prominent political figure in the People's Republic of China.

== Biography ==
In 1950, Ma Zupeng became a graduate of the Department of Economics at the Law School of Tsinghua University. He commenced his professional career as a clerk at the China National Grease Company (Chinese: 中国油脂公司), where he later served as the deputy head of section from 1950 to 1955. He became a member of the Chinese Communist Party in December 1953. Ma held a variety of positions in the Ministry of Commerce from 1955 to 1979, including secretary, deputy head of section, and chief of the Policy Research Office. He was appointed Yao Yilin's secretary in 1979. In 1983, he assumed the additional responsibility of deputy secretary-general of the Central Leading Group of Finance and Economy, which entailed the title of deputy minister.

Ma Zupeng died in Beijing on June 23, 2024, at the age of 98, following a prolonged illness.
