= Jiangyan High School =

School in Jiangsu, China

- Simplified Chinese: 江苏省姜堰中学; Traditional Chinese: 江苏省姜堰中学; Pinyin: Jiāngsūshěng Zhōngxué
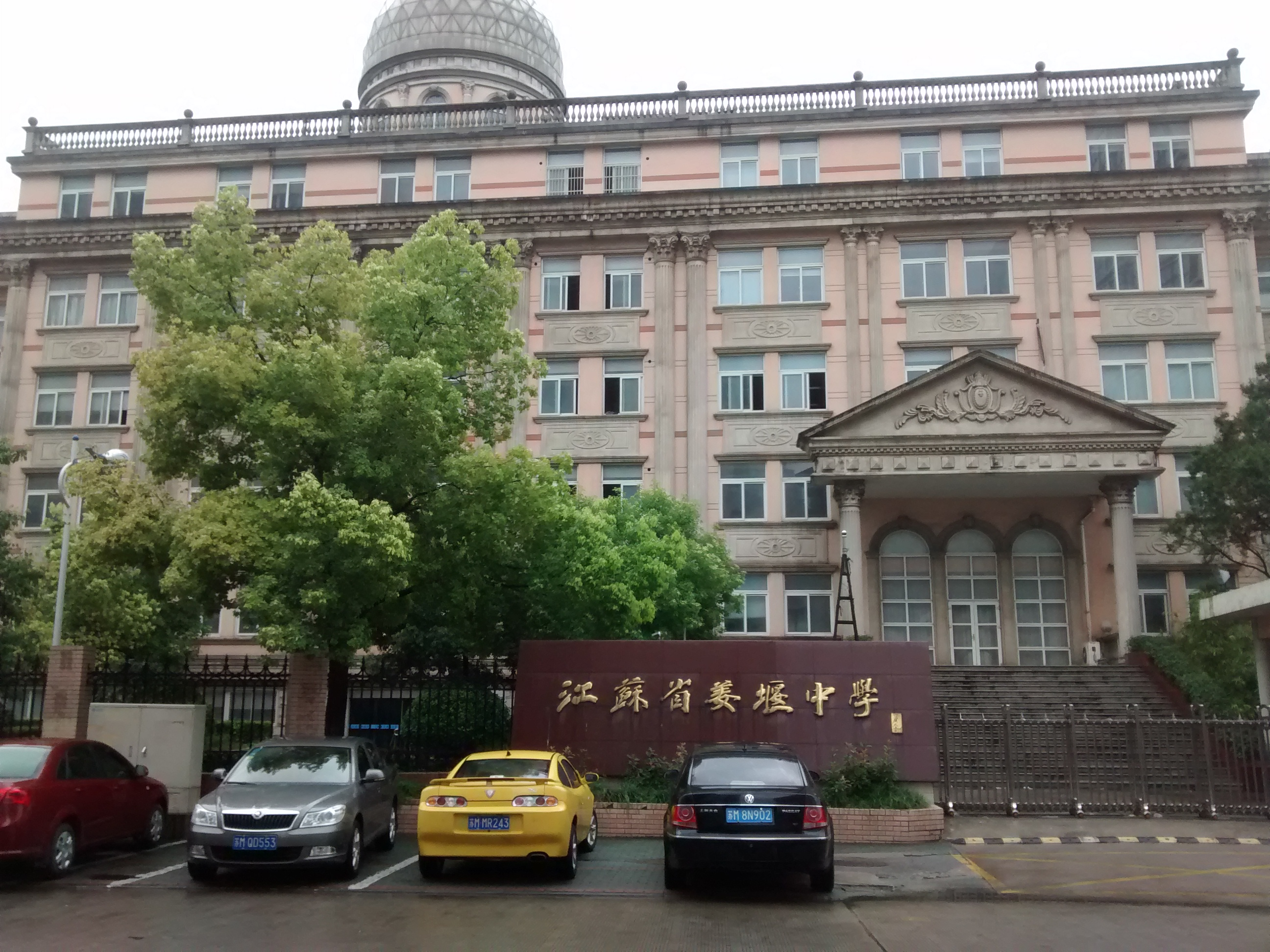

Information
- Established: 1939; 87 years ago
- Founder: Gao Hama
- President: Diao Chengcai
- Staff: 260
- Enrollment: 2800
- Classes: 52
- Area: 50,000 square metres (540,000 sq ft)

Jiangsu Jiangyan High School, also known as Jiangyan High or Jiangzhong, is a high school located at Jiangyan City, Taizhou Prefecture, Jiangsu. The school was founded by Gao Hama in 1939. In 1980, it was named a Key Middle School (重点中学) by the government of Jiangsu province. In 1996 it was designated as a Provincial Run School (省立中学) and it passed the National Model School Qualification (国家级示范性高中验收) in 1999.

== Description ==
In the 1950s Jiangyan Middle School became a public school. The scale of the school expanded, and when the number of students increased, the school facilities became deficient. New classrooms and offices were built, and a new auditorium at the same time. In 1952, on the former site of the South Day Temple, the school built the auditorium, named the May Fourth Movement Hall. The hall has an area of 500 square metres (5,400 sq ft), with a stage, a film projection booth, and other amenities. The auditorium is heavily used as a meeting room, a restaurant for students, a factory workshop, and a dorm room. There are three interconnected buildings in the school, one for each grade. There is a reading room in which students can read books, do homework, or discuss problems. The main administration building has a Roman style.

== Staff ==
The school has more than 260 teaching and administrative staff. Cooperation with a high school in Australia in 1999 led to several teacher exchanges between the schools. Since the reform and opening up of China, Jiangyan Middle School has attracted many young students from beyond Jiangsu province. Many students have achieved good scores in the national college entrance exam. The Jianyan Computer Science Olympia team placed first in the Jiangsu tournament, and over 30 students have won provincial or higher awards. The secretary general of the school was named to the National Advanced Party Branch (全国先进基层党组织).

== Awards ==
In 2007 Jiangyan Middle School became one of the first five-star high schools in Jiangsu province; it is the only five-star high school in Taizhou. The students consistently excel in the university entrance exams and win provincial prizes each year. Recently three students have won gold prizes and one student won the international gold prize. Each year, approximately ten students are admitted Tsinghua University and Beijing University.

== Previous presidents ==
- Qian Yiwu (钱一武)
- Lian Wanneng (连万能)
- Liu Chongxun (刘崇训)
- Xu Xinxiang (徐星祥)
