= Xinghua High School =

School in Jiangsu, China

Xinghua High School (兴化中学) was founded in 1926 and its original name was "Xinghua County Junior High School (兴化县立初级中学)". The school is located in the original site of Wenzheng College (文正学院). The school had employed well-trained teachers to teach student, which made it become well known as the Kuan Xing Wui (群英会). After the Second Sino-Japanese War, the school moved to a temple in Xinghua city. After the New China was founded in 1952, the Jiangsu Civil Administration decided to name the school Jiangsu Xinghua School (苏北兴化中学). In 1953, it was renamed Xinghua High School, Jiangsu Province and became one of the provincial first-class high schools. In 1980, the provincial government claimed the school as a member of the province's first government run schools. In 1994, it was accepted as one of the provincial key high schools. In 2004, Jiangsu Province, it received the first four-star high school acceptance in Jiangsu province.
