= Heheng =

Village in Jiangyan, China

Coordinates: 32°36′N 120°08′E

Heheng (Chinese: 河横) is a village in Jiangyan city, China. It was awarded Global 500 Roll of Honour by the United Nations Environment Programme (UNEP) in 1990 because of its success in protecting the environment while increasing the grain yield, and its wide use of marsh biogas ponds.
