= Taizhou High School Jiangsu =

Public high school in Taizhou, Jiangsu, China

- 江苏省泰州中学
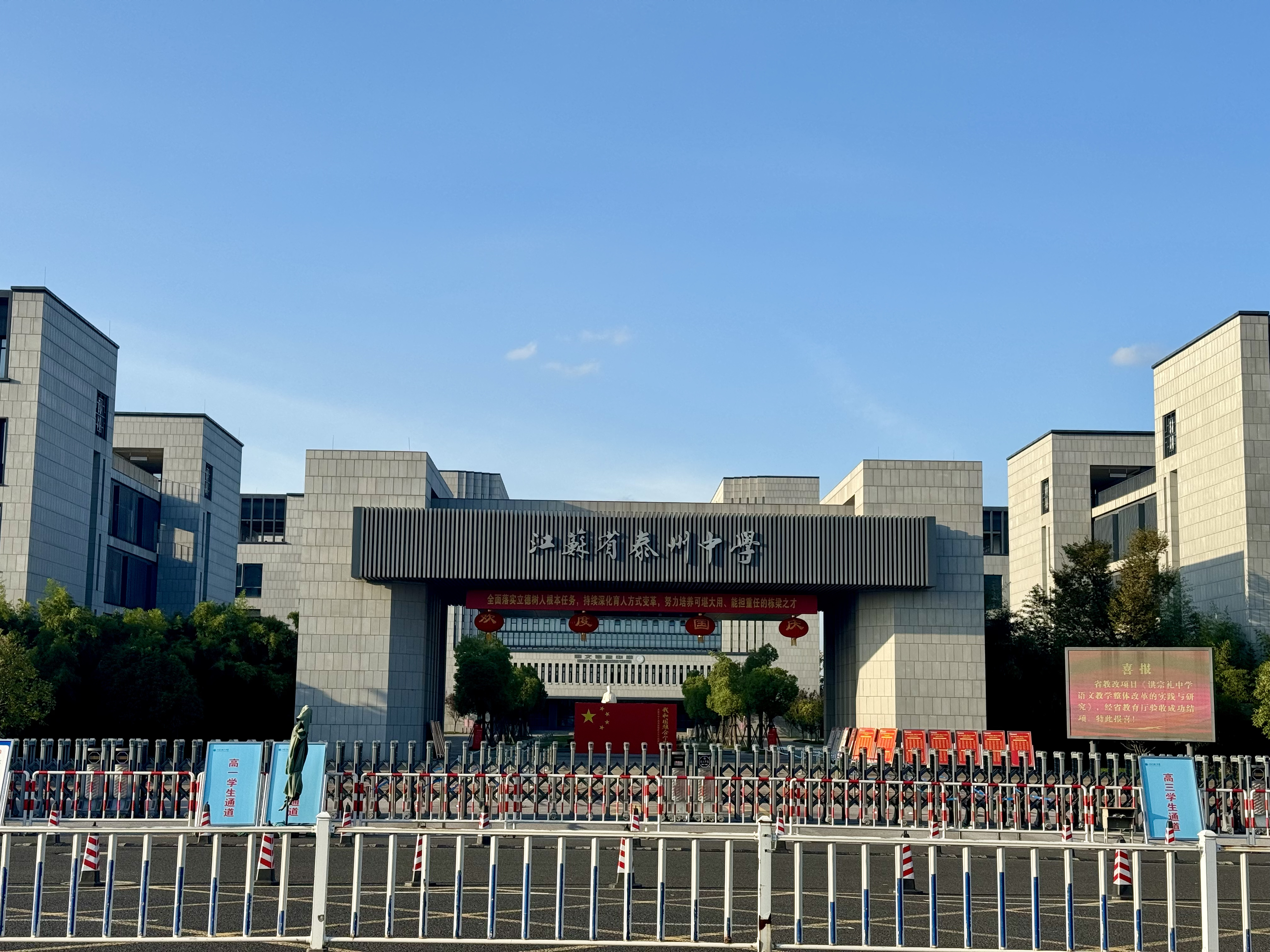
- Taizhou, Jiangsu; China

Information
- Type: Public
- Established: 1902
- Principal: Lu Rong
- Website: www.stzzx.com

Taizhou High School Jiangsu (Chinese: 江苏省泰州中学) is a public high school in Taizhou, Jiangsu, China. The school was founded in 1902 as Taizhou Academy and is now sponsored by Taizhou City.

== Notable alumni ==
- Hu Jintao, the former General Secretary of the Chinese Communist Party, graduated from Taizhou High School in 1959, before continuing his studies at Tsinghua University.
- Li Deren, owner of 2023 Highest Science and Technology Award.
