= Qintong Boat Festival =

Festival in Jiangyan, Jiangsu, China

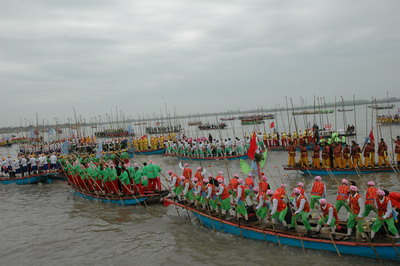
Dragon Boat Racing in Qintong Boat Festival

Qintong Boat Festival (Chinese: 溱潼会船节) is an annual event in Jiangyan, Jiangsu, China.

It has a long history since Ming Dynasty, and it is becoming an important tourist destination in the whole eastern China with the highlight of the Dragon Boat Racing. Qintong Boat Festival is held in Qingming (around April 4–6) every year. During the festival boats from nearby villages and towns converge in Xique lake for a few days of rejoicing. Theatrical performances, dragon and lion dances, and other folk dances are staged right on board the boats. It gathers about 300,000 people every year during the festival.
