= Shaobo Lake =

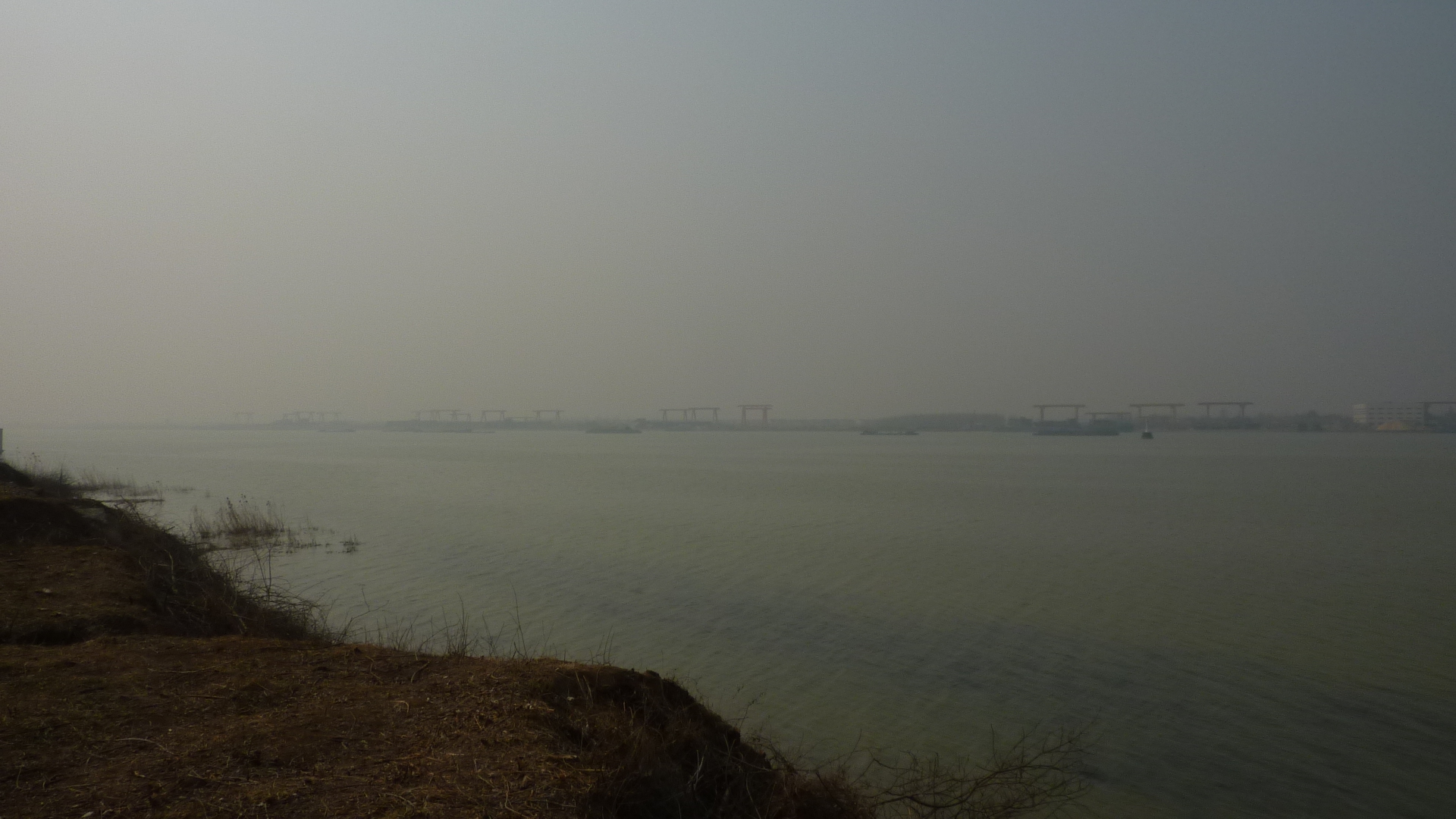

- Location within Jiangsu
- Coordinates: 32°37′N 119°26′E
- Lake type: freshwater lake
- Primary inflows: San R.
- Primary outflows: Jinwan R. Taiping R. Fenghuang R.
- Basin countries: China
- Max. length: 17 km (11 mi)
- Max. width: 6 km (4 mi)
- Surface area: 77 km^{2} (0 sq mi)
- Average depth: 1.10 m (4 ft)
- Max. depth: 1.43 m (5 ft)
- Water volume: 84.7×10^{6} m^{3} (2.99×10^{9} cu ft)
- Surface elevation: 4.3 m (14 ft)
- Settlements: Yangzhou

Shaobo Lake (Chinese: 邵伯湖; pinyin: Shàobó Hú) is a freshwater lake in Jiangsu Province, China. It is located between Gaoyou and Yangzhou. Shaobo Lake is a part of the Huai River system as the Huai River flows south through Shaobo Lake on its way to the Yangtze River like Gaoyou Lake. It is about 17 km long and 6 km wide, covering approximately 77 km^{2}.

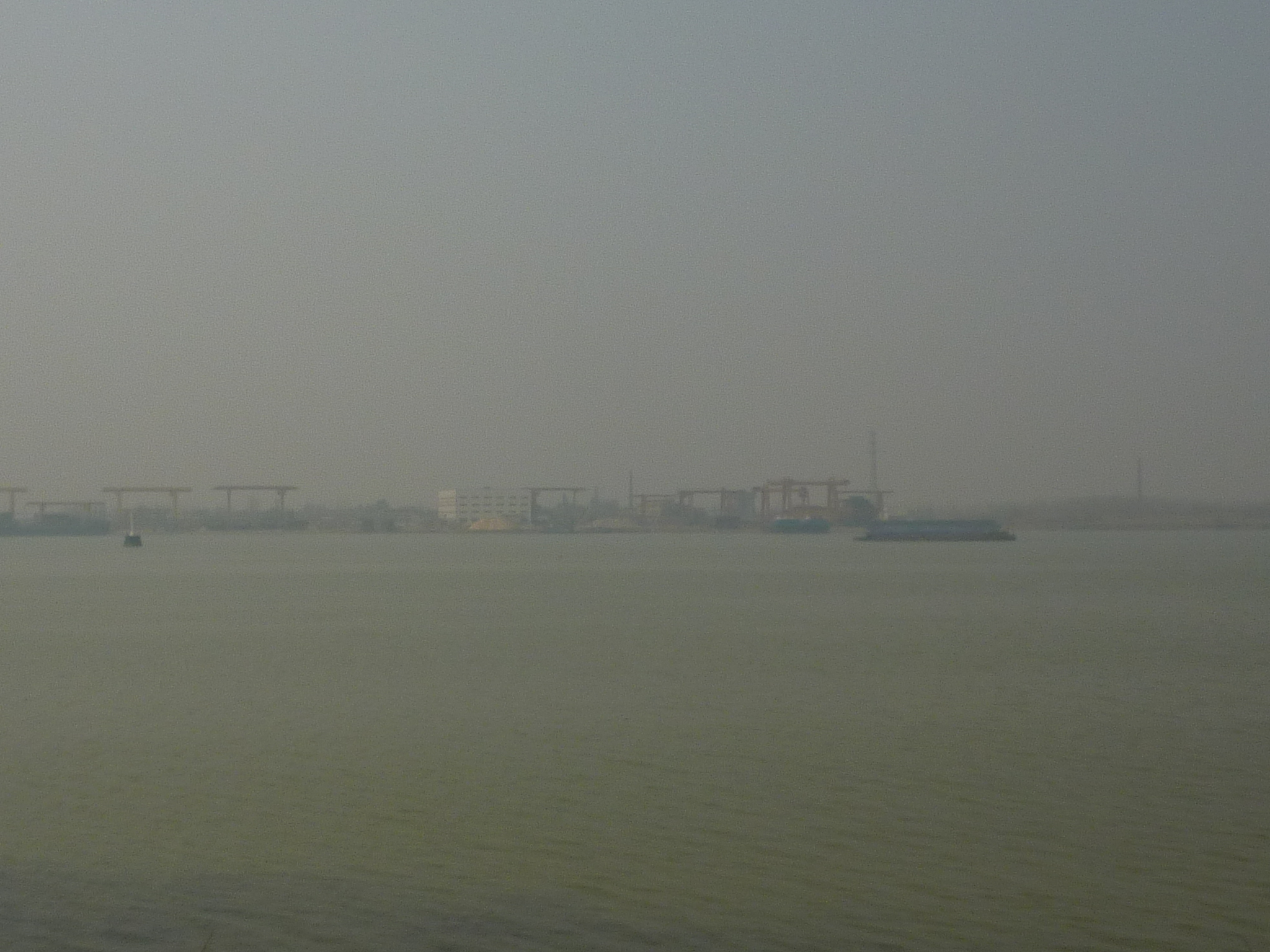
Shaobo Lake
