= Hailing, Taizhou =

Hailing 海陵区
- District
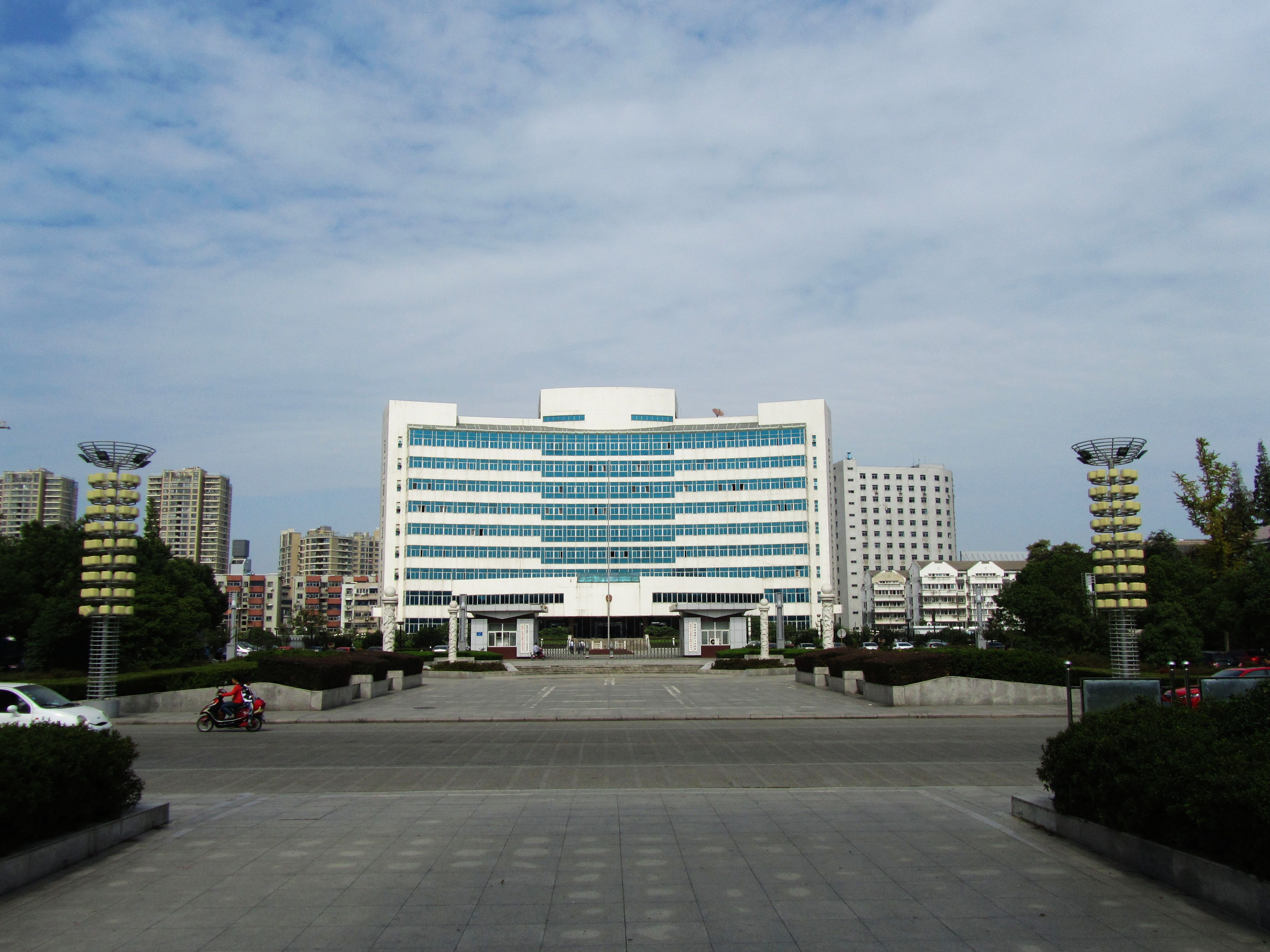
- Hailing District Government Building

- Location in Jiangsu
- Coordinates: 32°28′57″N 119°55′15″E
- Country: People's Republic of China
- Province: Jiangsu
- Prefecture-level city: Taizhou

Area
  - Total: 300 km^{2} (120 sq mi)

Population (2020 census)
  - Total: 577,016
  - Density: 1,900/km^{2} (5,000/sq mi)
- Time zone: UTC+8 (China Standard)
- Postal code: 225300

Hailing District (simplified Chinese: 海陵区; traditional Chinese: 海陵區; pinyin: Hǎilíng Qū; lit. 'sea hill') is one of three districts of Taizhou, Jiangsu province, China.

== Administrative divisions ==
At present, Hailing District has 11 subdistricts and 3 towns.

11 subdistricts

- Chengdong (城东街道)
- Chengxi (城西街道)
- Chengnan (城南街道)
- Chengzhong (城中街道)
- Chengbei (城北街道)
- Taishan (泰山街道)
- Jingtai (京泰路街道)
- Fenghuang (凤凰街道)
- Hongqi (红旗街道)
- Sixiang (寺巷街道)
- Mingzhu (明珠街道)

3 towns

- Jiulong (九龙镇)
- Gangyang (罡杨镇)
- Suchen (苏陈镇)
