= Jiangyan, Taizhou =

Jiangyan 姜堰区
- District
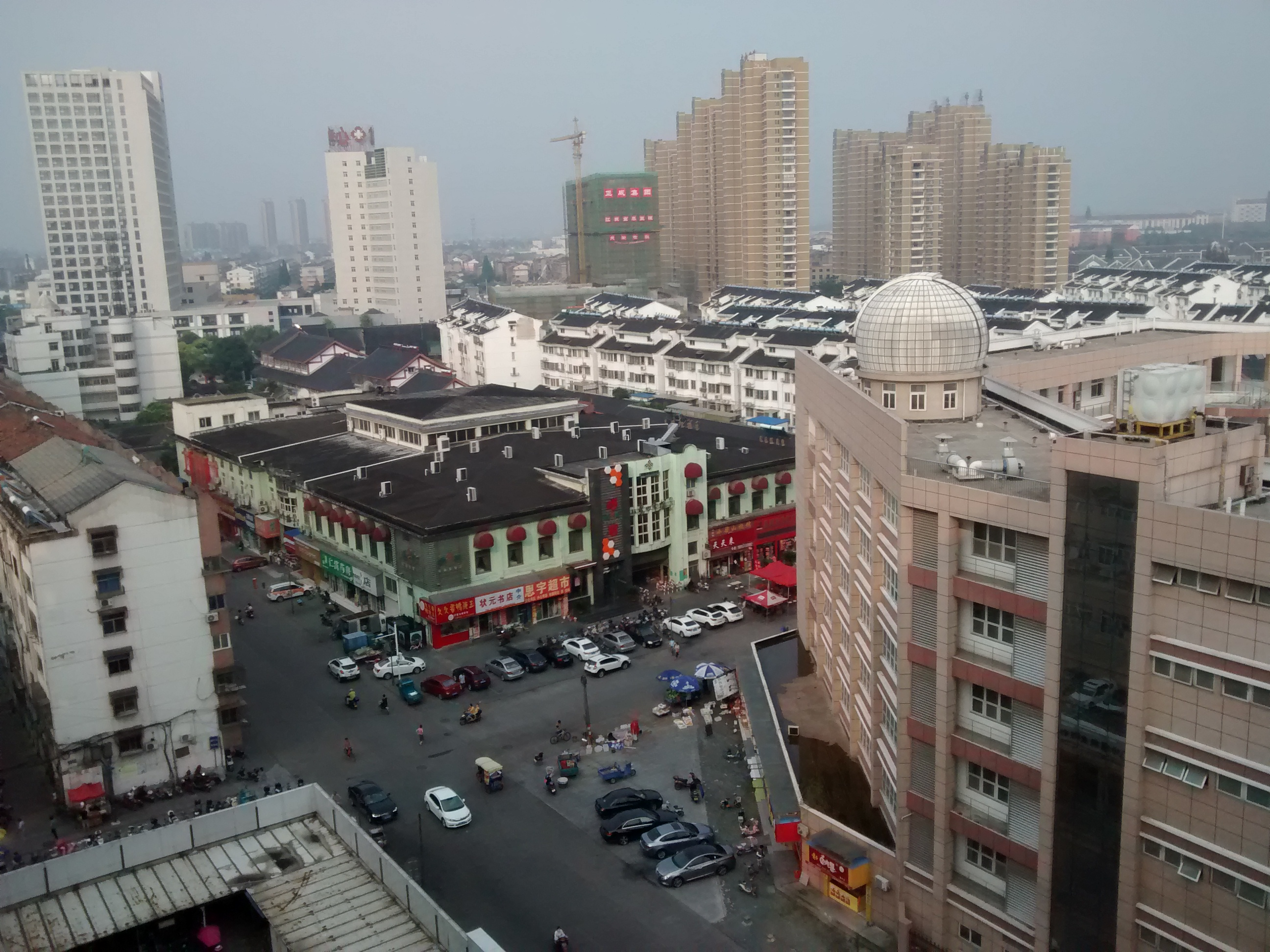

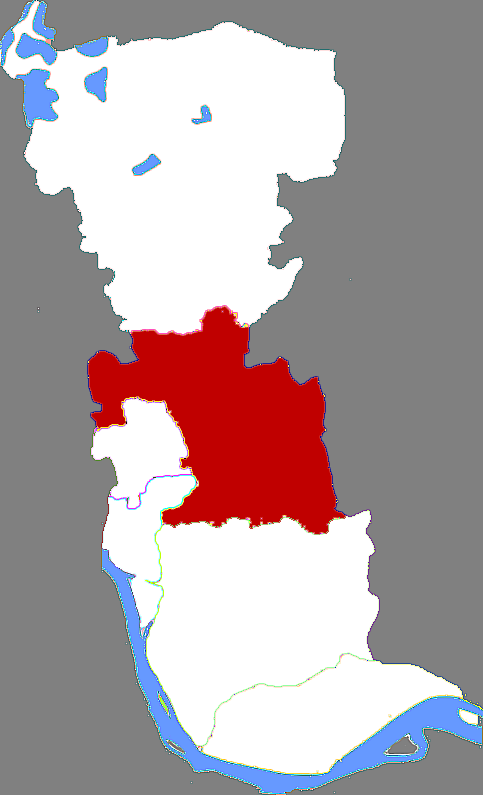
- Jiangyan in Taizhou

- Taizhou in Jiangsu
- Coordinates: 32°30′32″N 120°07′41″E
- Country: People's Republic of China
- Province: Jiangsu
- Prefecture-level city: Taizhou

Area
  - Total: 858.3 km^{2} (331.4 sq mi)

Population (2019)
  - Total: 743,500
  - Density: 866.2/km^{2} (2,244/sq mi)
- Time zone: UTC+8 (China Standard)
- Postal code: 225500

Jiangyan District (simplified Chinese: 姜堰区; traditional Chinese: 姜堰區; pinyin: Jiāngyàn Qū) is one of the three urban districts of the city of Taizhou, Jiangsu province. It was a county-level city until December 2012. Jiangyan is known for being the birthplace of the former General Secretary of the Chinese Communist Party Hu Jintao.

== History ==
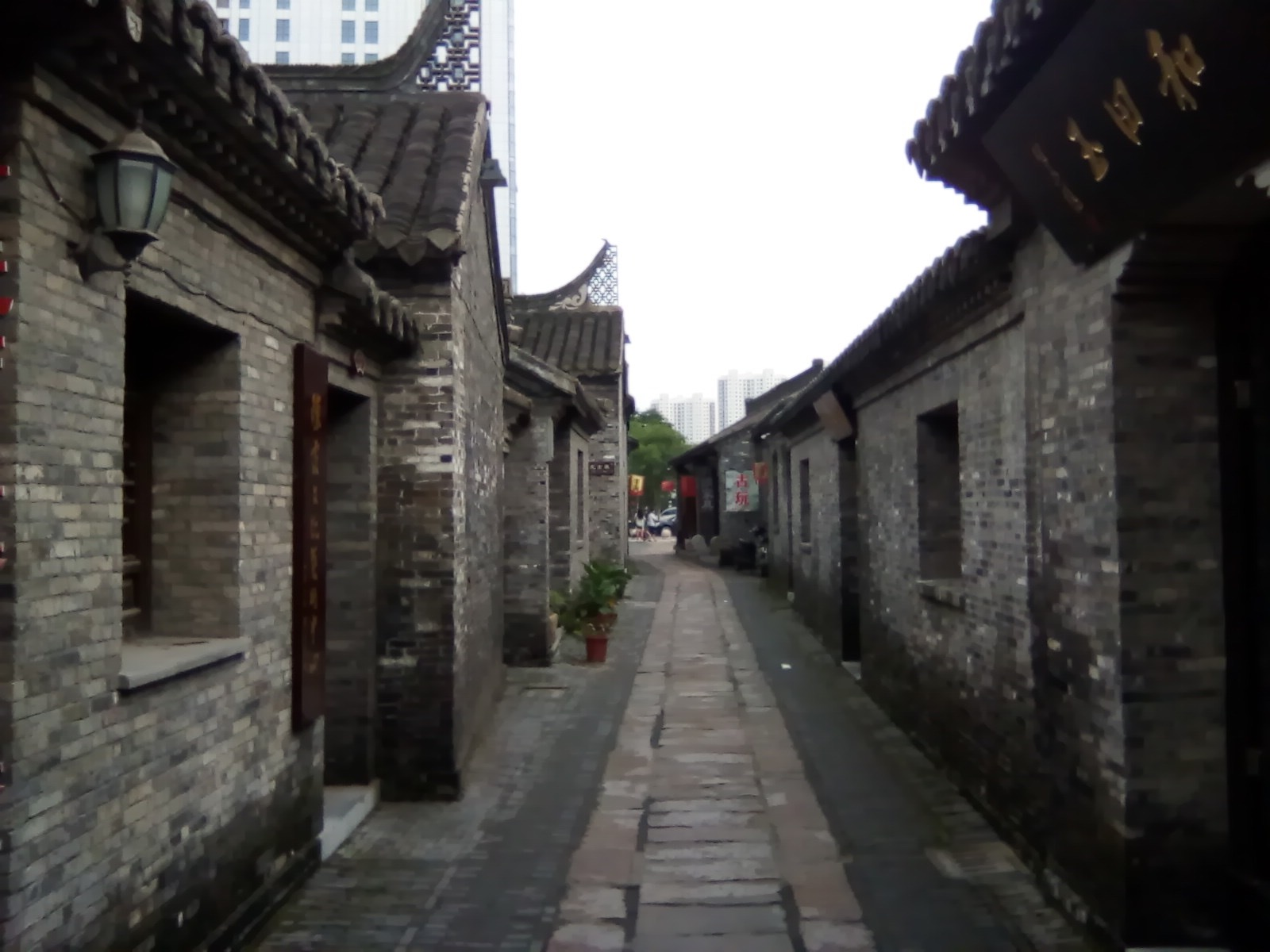
Historical neighborhood in Jianyan

Formerly called Taixian or Taihsien (simplified Chinese: 泰县; traditional Chinese: 泰縣; pinyin: Tāi Xīan), Jiangyan was a county by the end of the Western Han dynasty. It has relics from the Zhou dynasty and a Buddha statue from the Tang dynasty. It became a town during the reign of the Qing dynasty.

Jiangyan has previously also been called Hailu (海陆), Wuling (吴陵), and Taizhou (泰州). In July 1994, the name was changed to Jiangyan and city status granted.

The Qintong Boat Festival (溱潼会船) has a long history that can be traced back to Ming dynasty. Jiangyan is growing in importance as a tourist destination in eastern China.

The Baima Temple (白马庙, meaning white horse temple) in Jiangyan (now in Taizhou) is the birthplace of the Navy of the People's Liberation Army.

The first Soviet base in northern Jiangsu was founded in Jiangyan by the No. 14 Red Army.

Jiangyan has been working to modernize the district through enhanced education and technology opportunities. Many technologies have been developed in Jiangyan, and more than 70 patents have been registered. Jiangyan has been among the "Top 100 most economically competitive counties in China" since 1995.

In 1990, Jiangyan was awarded the Global 500 Roll of Honor by the United Nations Environment Programme (UNEP) for its success in protecting the environment and increasing grain yield through wide use of marsh biogas ponds.

== Geography ==
Located in the center of Jiangsu province, Jiangyan is bordered on the east by Hai'an and Dongtai. To the west lie the districts of Hailing and Gaogang. Taixing is to the south and Xinghua to the north.

== Climate ==
Climate data for Jiangyan, elevation 6 m (20 ft), (1991–2020 normals, extremes 1981–present)
Month	Jan	Feb	Mar	Apr	May	Jun	Jul	Aug	Sep	Oct	Nov	Dec	Year
Record high °C (°F)	20.8 (69.4)	25.8 (78.4)	33.7 (92.7)	32.4 (90.3)	35.5 (95.9)	38.3 (100.9)	38.4 (101.1)	38.7 (101.7)	37.3 (99.1)	32.2 (90.0)	28.3 (82.9)	21.8 (71.2)	38.7 (101.7)
Mean daily maximum °C (°F)	6.9 (44.4)	9.3 (48.7)	14.1 (57.4)	20.3 (68.5)	25.8 (78.4)	28.7 (83.7)	31.7 (89.1)	31.2 (88.2)	27.5 (81.5)	22.5 (72.5)	16.3 (61.3)	9.6 (49.3)	20.3 (68.6)
Daily mean °C (°F)	2.8 (37.0)	4.8 (40.6)	9.0 (48.2)	14.9 (58.8)	20.4 (68.7)	24.3 (75.7)	27.7 (81.9)	27.3 (81.1)	23.2 (73.8)	17.8 (64.0)	11.6 (52.9)	5.2 (41.4)	15.8 (60.3)
Mean daily minimum °C (°F)	−0.2 (31.6)	1.3 (34.3)	5.0 (41.0)	10.1 (50.2)	15.8 (60.4)	20.6 (69.1)	24.6 (76.3)	24.3 (75.7)	19.9 (67.8)	14.0 (57.2)	7.9 (46.2)	1.9 (35.4)	12.1 (53.8)
Record low °C (°F)	−11.4 (11.5)	−10.0 (14.0)	−5.6 (21.9)	−1.9 (28.6)	5.5 (41.9)	11.3 (52.3)	16.9 (62.4)	17.2 (63.0)	9.8 (49.6)	0.9 (33.6)	−4.2 (24.4)	−11.2 (11.8)	−11.4 (11.5)
Average precipitation mm (inches)	46.1 (1.81)	45.3 (1.78)	74.6 (2.94)	67.2 (2.65)	88.5 (3.48)	162.2 (6.39)	206.2 (8.12)	159.9 (6.30)	90.4 (3.56)	52.1 (2.05)	51.1 (2.01)	35.0 (1.38)	1,078.6 (42.47)
Average precipitation days (≥ 0.1 mm)	8.5	8.7	9.9	9.1	10.0	10.5	13.2	12.4	8.6	7.0	7.9	6.8	112.6
Average snowy days	3.2	2.7	0.8	0	0	0	0	0	0	0	0.3	1.0	8
Average relative humidity (%)	72	74	70	70	71	75	80	80	79	73	73	70	74
Mean monthly sunshine hours	126.6	128.4	154.9	180.5	188.3	138.6	171.7	187.4	165.0	165.3	140.3	138.1	1,885.1
Percentage possible sunshine	40	41	42	46	44	32	40	46	45	47	45	45	43
Source: China Meteorological Administration aAll-time September high all-time January high

== Transportation ==
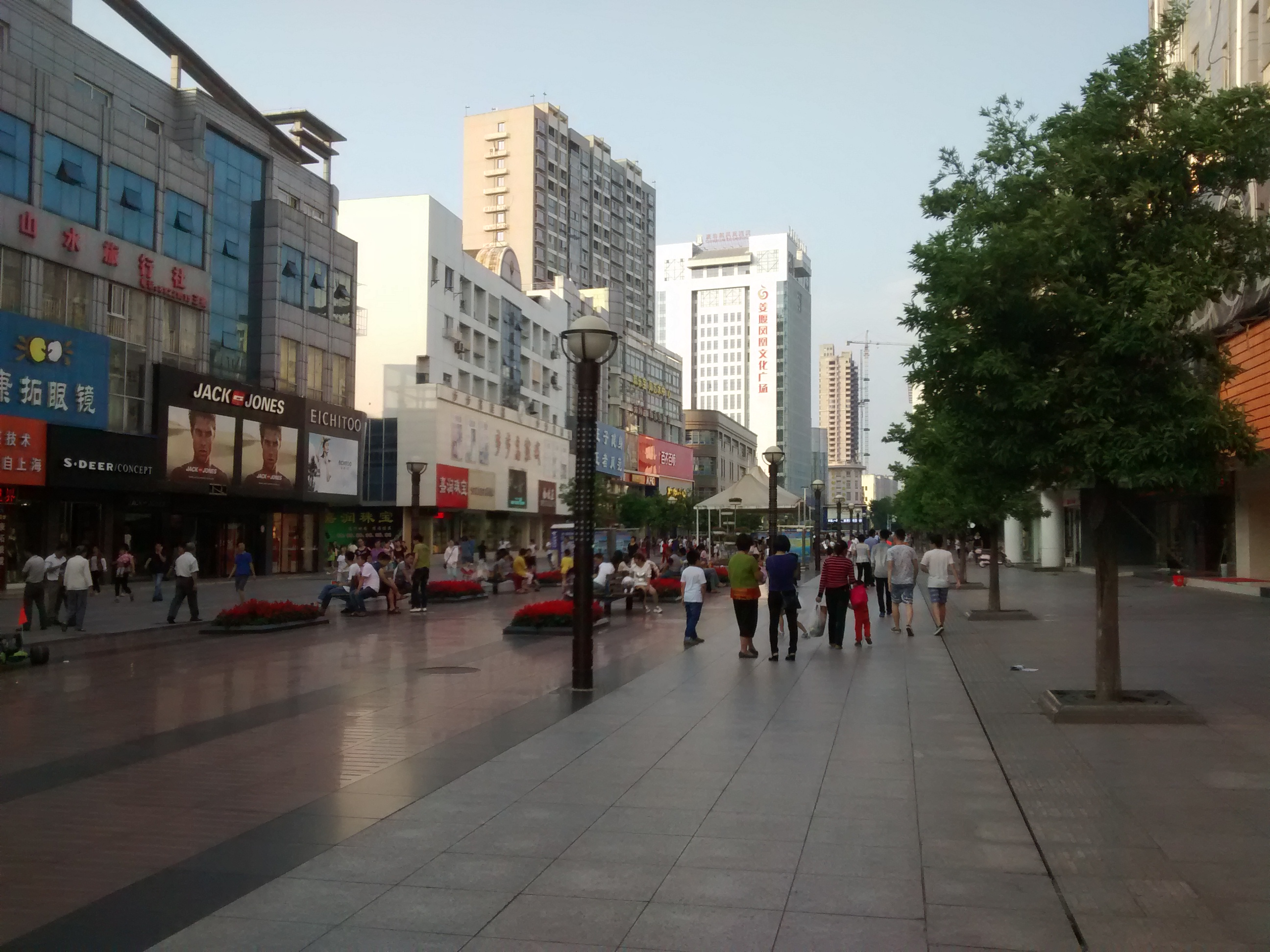
Street in pedestrian zone of downtown Jiangyan

The Nanjing-Jinjiang-Yancheng Highway runs north–south through the district, and National Highway 328 runs east–west. Water transportation is by the Yangzhou Canal and by the Zhonggan, Jiangyan-Qintong and Jiangyan-Huangqiao rivers.

There is bus service to Jiangyan from Shanghai or Nanjing via National Highway 328 and the Nanjing-Jinjiang-Yancheng Highway.

By road, Shanghai can be reached from Jiangyan in under three hours.

Jiangyan's railway station, located north of the town, has both ordinary trains (K/Z), on long-distance routes, and modern, faster D-trains running from Nantong, Hai'an, Taizhou, Yangzhou, and Nanjing and since the Hutong Yangtze River bridge opened in 2020, through to Shanghai in around 90 minutes.

== Administrative divisions ==
Jiangyan District is divided into 15 towns:

- Jiangyan (姜堰镇)
- Qintong (溱潼镇)
- Jiangduo (蒋垛镇)
- Gugao (顾高镇)
- Dalun (大伦镇)
- Zhangdian (张甸镇)
- Liangxu (梁徐镇)
- Qiaotou (桥头镇)
- Yuxi (淤溪镇)
- Baimi (白米镇)
- Leizhuang (娄庄镇)
- Shengao (沈高镇)
- Xingtai (兴泰镇)
- Yuduo (俞垛镇)
- Huagang (华港镇)

== Demographics ==
As of 2019 there were 251,200 households in Jiangyan and the population was 735,800, of which 366,300 are female, accounting for 49.8% of the total population. In recent years, Jiangyan has been experiencing a loss of population from job loss and a declining birth rate.

In 2019, there were 4,180 births (for a birth rate of 6.4‰) and 6,319 deaths (death rate of 8.9‰). The resident population at the end of 2019 was 692,600, with 65.1% of them living in the city.

== Education ==
As of 2019 Jiangyan district has 44 kindergartens, 29 primary schools, 15 secondary schools, and 5 high schools. Jiangyan High School and Jiangyan Secondary High School were named as model high schools and promoted to be provincial high schools. There are 86,388 students, including 15,543 in kindergartens, 33,270 in primary schools, 20,069 in secondary schools, 12,425 in high schools, 4,922 in professional schools, and 159 in special education schoole. 98% of school-age children attend schools.

== Economics ==
In 2019, the GDP of Jiangyan grew by 6.6% to 66,972 million CNY (around 9.7 billion USD); per capita GDP was 96,752 CNY ($14,000). Primary industry grew by 2.2%, to 4.9 billion CNY; secondary industry grew by 5.9%, to 31.7 billion CNY; and tertiary industry grew 8.2% to 30.4 billion CNY. The relative sizes of the three sectors was 7.3:47.3:45.4. For two consecutive years, Jiangyan has been named among the "Best 100 districts in China", in terms of comprehensive strength, investment potential, urbanization quality, green development, and technology innovation.

== Tourism ==
=== Qintong Boat Festival ===
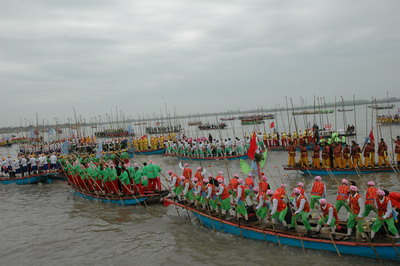
Dragon Boat Racing in Qintong Boat Festival

The Qintong Boat Festival is held every year in Qingming, around April 4–6. During the festival, boats from nearby villages and towns converge on Xique lake for a few days of celebration. Theatrical performances, dragon and lion dances, and other folk dances are held on the boats.

A highlight of the festival is the racing of boats using long poles instead of paddles.

The boat festival is an important tourist attraction and attracts foreign investment to the area.

=== Xique Lake ===
Xique Lake is located in Qintong, 15 kilometres (9.3 mi) north of Jiangyan, and makes up part of the Qintong Swamp.

=== Museums ===
- Gao Ershi Museum, Jiangyan

== Notable people ==
Jiangyan is known for a number of notable people:

- General Chen Yi commanded the Battle of Huangqiao in Qujiang Tower, in downtown Jiangyan.
- Ming dynasty general Tang Shunzhi (唐顺之) fought the Japanese wokou in Jiangyan.
- Yue Fei (岳飞) and Wen Tianxiang (文天祥) were both stationed in Jiangyan to fight against the Jin and Mongol invaders during the Song dynasty.
- Wang Dong (王栋), one of the founders of the 'Taizhou clique' philosophy, taught in Jiangyan for decades in the Wanggong Temple ("王公祠"). The temple is now preserved as a museum.
- Liu Jingting (柳敬亭) was Master of Yangzhou Pingtan, a form of traditional Chinese opera.
- The artist Tang Zhique (唐志契), along with his brother Tang Zhiyi (唐志尹) and nephew Tang Riyin (唐日艮), the so-called 'Three Tangs', were from Jiangyan during the Ming dynasty.
- Huang Longshi (黄龙士) was a Master of go in the Qing dynasty.
- Gao Ershi (高二适) was a calligrapher in modern times.
- Lu Fubao (卢福保) was the consul of Taiwan.
- Hu Jintao (胡锦涛), the former General Secretary of the Chinese Communist Party, was born in Jiangyan.
- Cao Jun (曹俊), artist currently living in the United States.
