= Taizhou, Jiangsu =

City in Jiangsu, China

Taizhou 泰州市 Taichow
- Prefecture-level city
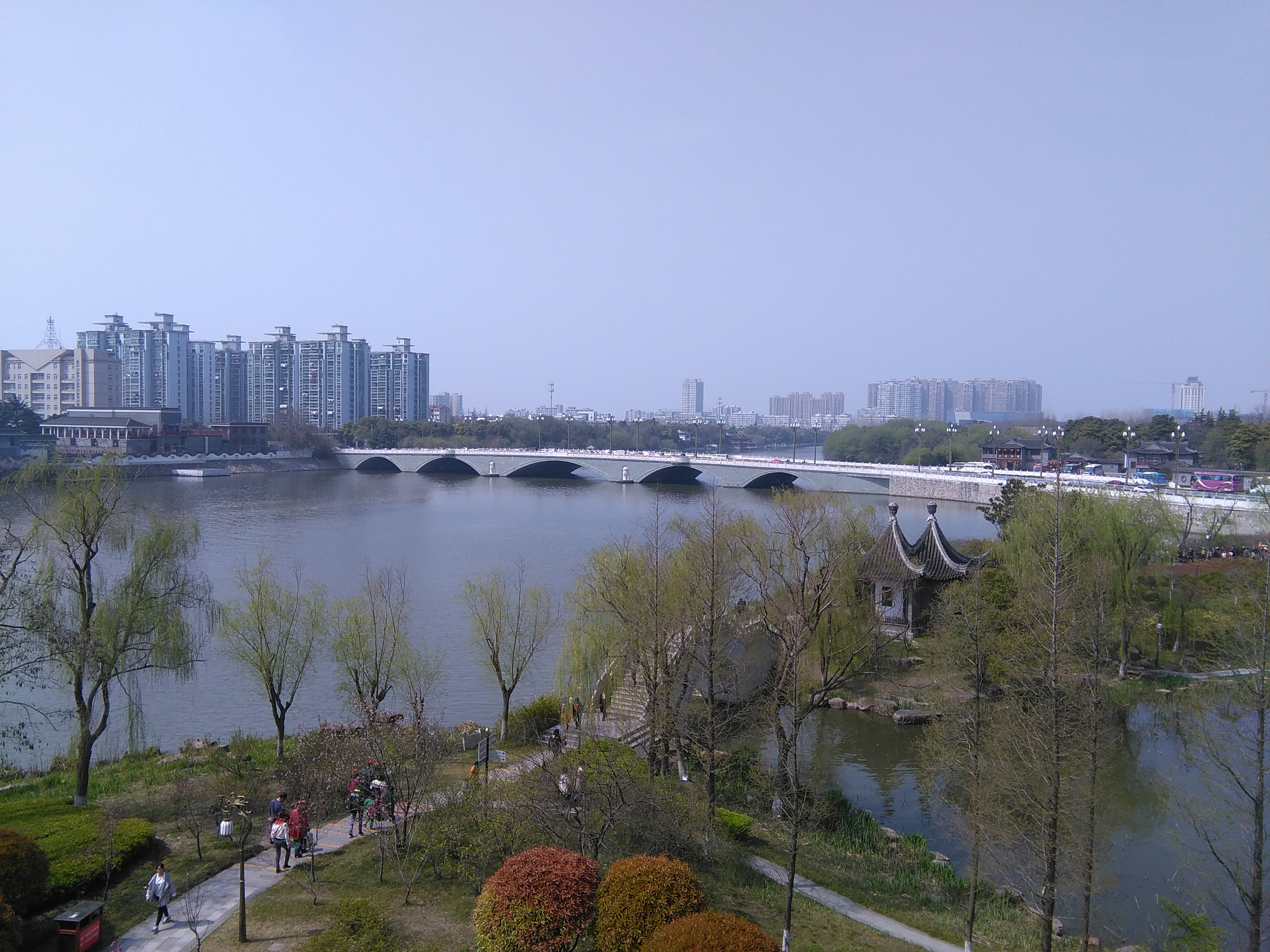
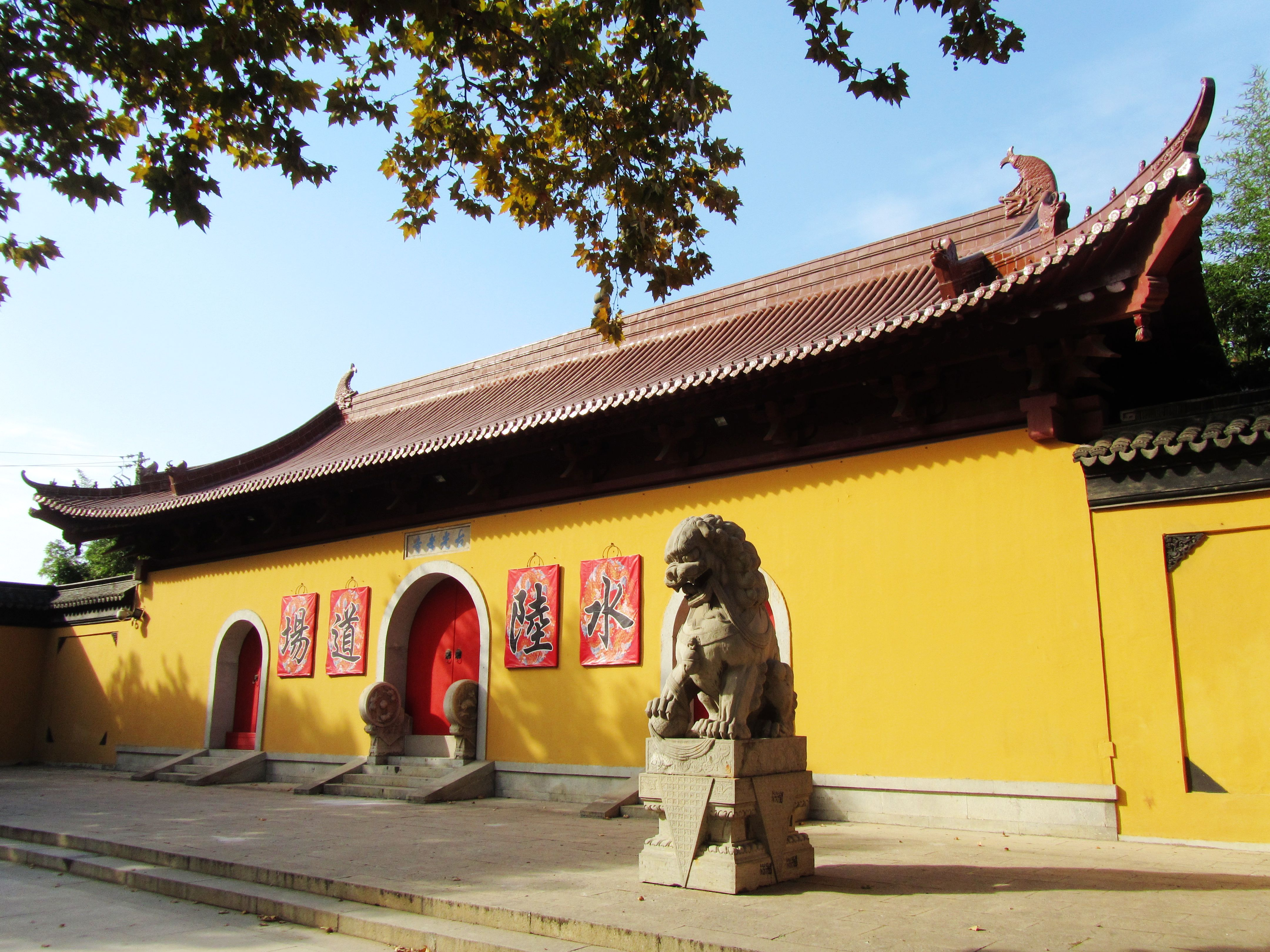
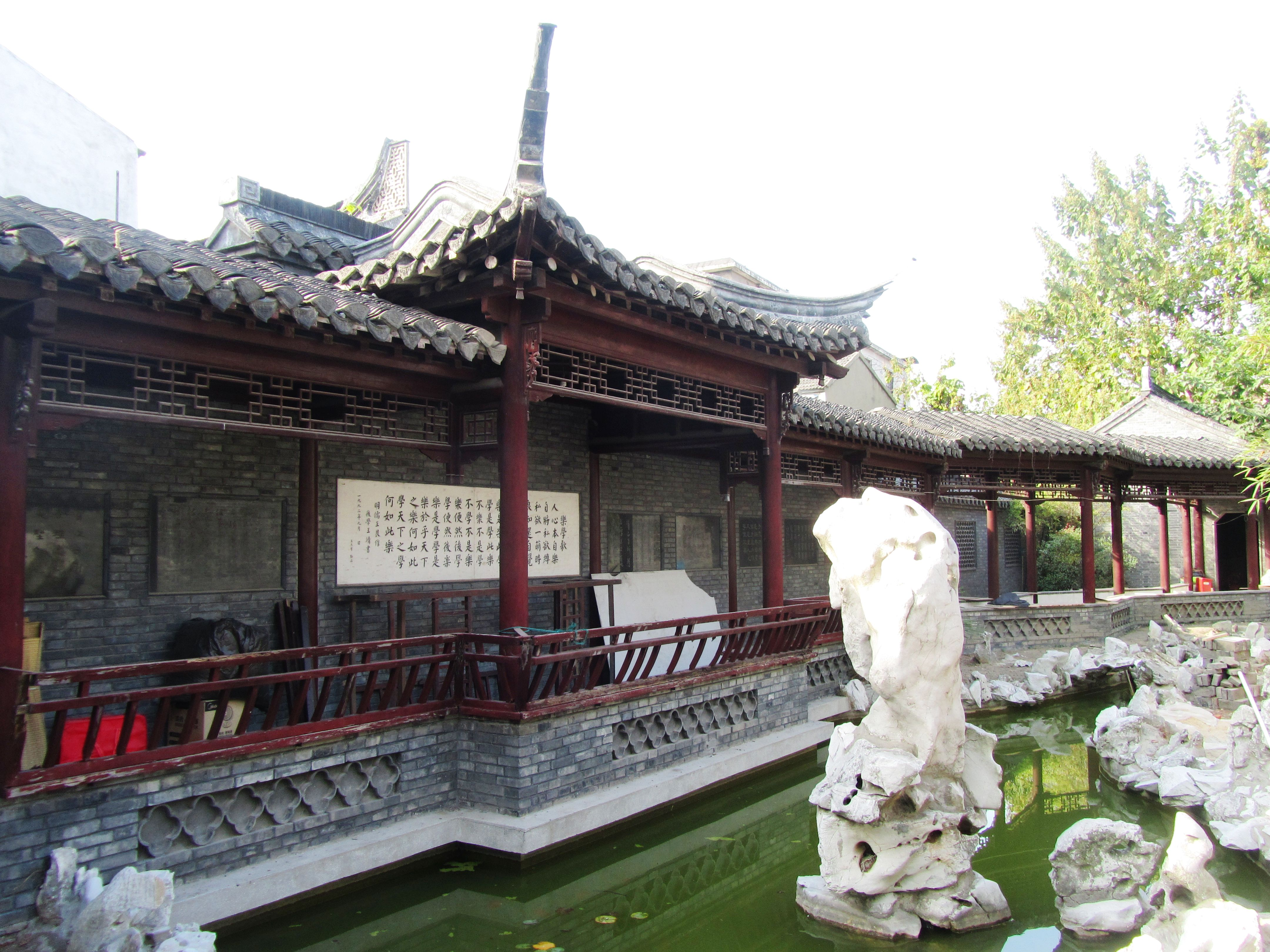
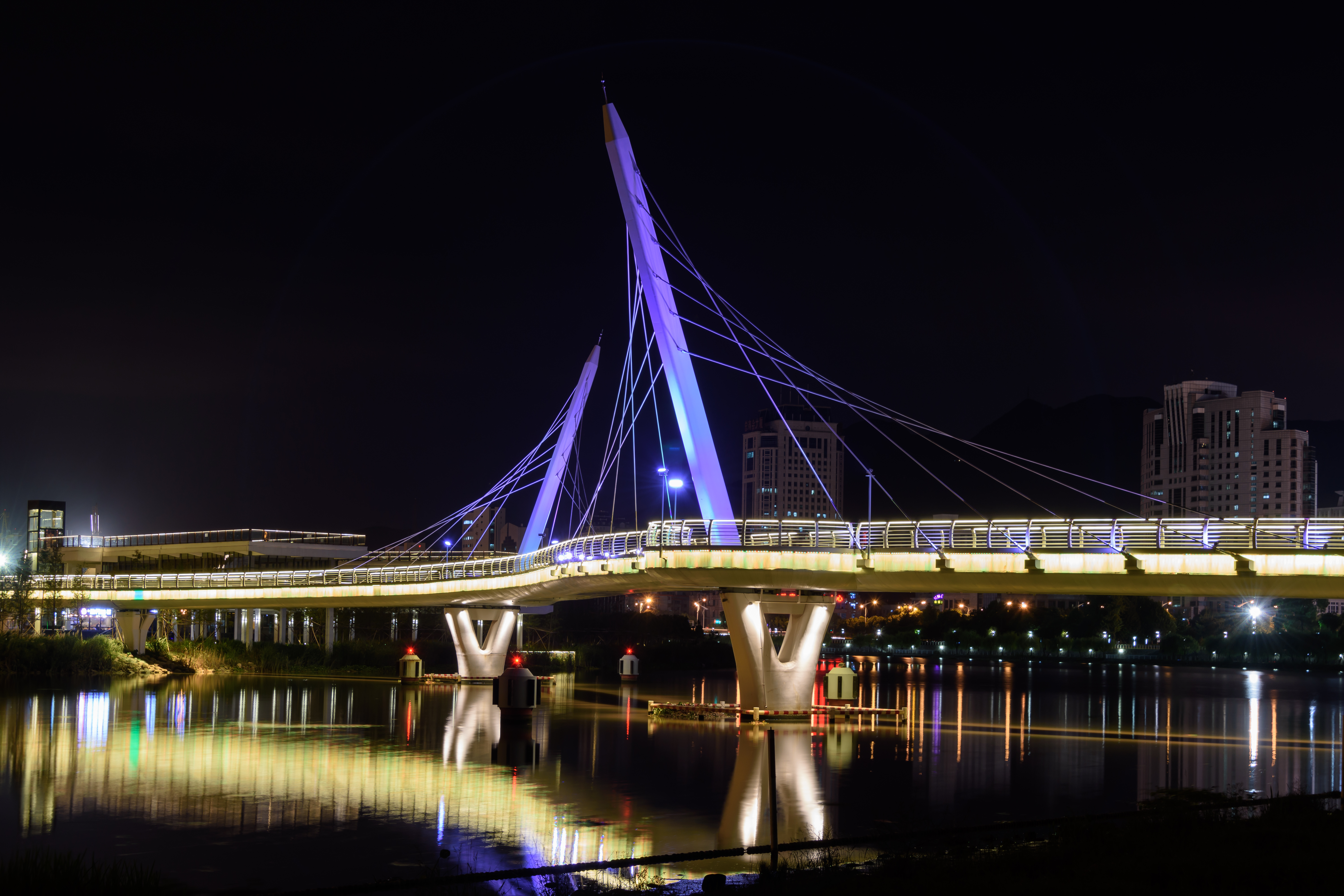
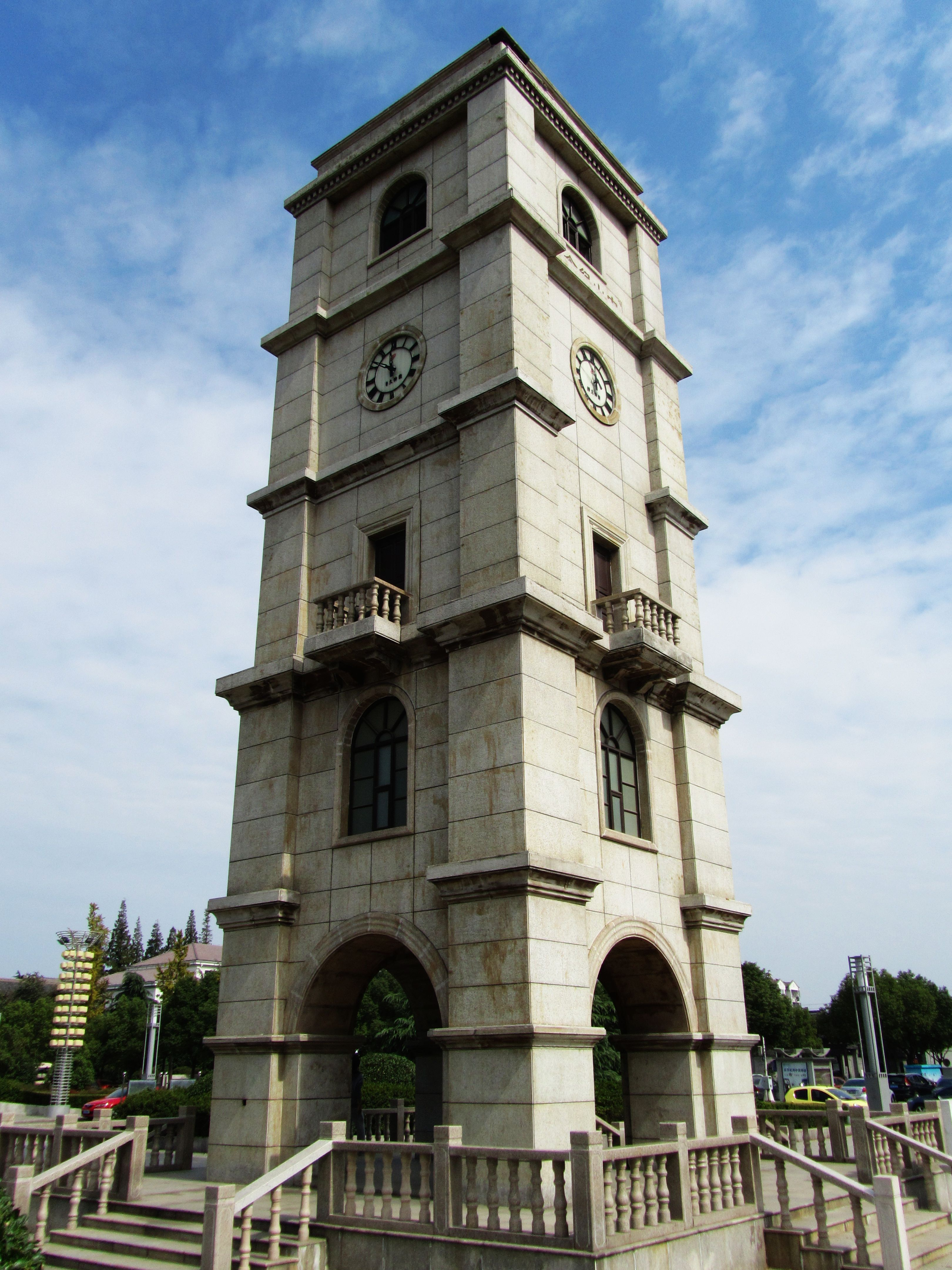
- Left to right, top to bottom: skyline of Taizhou viewed from Qingfengge, Guangxiao Temple, Taizhou School of Thought Memorial Hall, Taizhou Yangtze River Bridge, Sun Yat-sen Memorial Tower

- Taizhou's administrative area highlighted within Jiangsu province

- Location of the city center in Jiangsu Taizhou (Eastern China) Taizhou (China)
- Coordinates (Taizhou municipal government): 32°27′24″N 119°55′22″E
- Country: People's Republic of China
- Province: Jiangsu
- Municipal seat: Hailing District

Government
  - Mayor: Shi Lijun

Area
  - Prefecture-level city: 5,787.254 km^{2} (2,234.471 sq mi)
  - Metro: 1,567.1 km^{2} (605.1 sq mi)
- Elevation: 5 m (16 ft)
- Highest elevation: 55.6 m (182 ft)

Population (2020 census)
  - Prefecture-level city: 4,512,762
  - Density: 779.7760/km^{2} (2,019.611/sq mi)
  - Urban: 3,071,179
  - Metro: 1,504,014
  - Metro density: 959.74/km^{2} (2,485.7/sq mi)

GDP
  - Prefecture-level city: CN¥ 702 billion US$ 98.6 billion
  - Per capita: CN¥ 109,988; US$ 16,652
- Time zone: UTC+8 (China Standard)
- Postal code: 225300 (Urban center); 214500, 225400, 225500, 225600, 225700 (Other areas)
- Area code: 523
- ISO 3166 code: CN-JS-12
- Major Nationalities: Han
- County-level divisions: 6
- Township-level divisions: 105
- License Plate Prefix: 苏M
- Website: www.taizhou.gov.cn

Taizhou
- "Tàizhōu", as written in Chinese
- Chinese: 泰州
- Hanyu Pinyin: Tàizhōu
- Postal: Taichow
Transcriptions
Standard Mandarin
- Hanyu Pinyin: Tàizhōu
- Bopomofo: ㄊㄞˋ ㄓㄡ
- Gwoyeu Romatzyh: Tayjou
- Wade–Giles: Tʻai^{4}-chou^{1}
- IPA: [tʰâɪ.ʈʂóʊ]
Wu
- Wugniu: tha^{5} tseu^{1}
- IPA: Shanghainese: [tʰa˧ tsɤ˦]
Yue: Cantonese
- Jyutping: taai^{3} zau^{1}
- IPA: [tʰaj˧.tsɐw˥]

Taizhou (Chinese: 泰州; pinyin: Tàizhōu) is a city in Jiangsu province in eastern China. Situated on the north bank of the Yangtze River, it borders Nantong to the east, Yancheng to the north and Yangzhou to the west.

The 2020 Chinese census counted its population at 4,512,762 of whom 1,504,014 live in the built-up (or metro) area made of three urban districts (Hailing, Jiangyan and Gaogang).

== History ==
=== Early history ===
Historically known as Hailing (often interpreted as"hill by the sea"), Taizhou was established as a county no later than the 2nd century BCE. Its administrative center was located on an ancient sandspit along the north bank of the Yangtze River, at an elevation of about 6–7 meters, while Xinghua to the north lay in the Lixiahe lowlands. Over the following centuries, sedimentation at the Yangtze estuary caused the coastline to shift southeastward. As a result, the southern regions of Taizhou and Taixing gradually emerged as land, and Jingjiang, originally a sandbar, had accreted to the north bank of the Yangtze by the turn of the 17th century.

The shifting coastline created extensive coastal salt fields in and around Taizhou, and the city at times served as a regional hub of salt administration, with the Hailing Salt Directorate established there in the Tang dynasty. In the imperial salt system, the Taizhou Branch Office of the Lianghuai Salt Distribution Commission was subordinate to the commission's headquarters in Yangzhou. Several present‑day county‑level jurisdictions to the east and north, such as Dongtai, Hai'an, and Rugao, trace their origins to historical salt‑field settlements that eventually developed into county seats.

From the Eastern Han onward, Taizhou was mostly subordinate to Guangling (later Yangzhou). Under the Southern Tang, a prefecture‑level Taizhou was first established; it was briefly elevated to the status of a lu (circuit) under the Yuan dynasty before returning to Yangzhou's jurisdiction.

In the mid-Ming dynasty, Wang Gen originally worked as a salt laborer under the Taizhou Branch Office. Later, as a leading disciple of Wang Yangming, he was invited to preside over Anding Academy in Taizhou in 1526. His lectures there attracted a group of local followers who became his first core disciples, and their activities subsequently gave rise to the "Taizhou School," a radical branch of the School of Mind noted for its populist character and sometimes described as its "left wing."

=== Late Qing and Republican era ===
After the Taiping forces captured Yangzhou, the Lianghuai Salt Distribution Commission was temporarily relocated to Taizhou. In the 1860s, a General Bureau of Merchant Recruitment was established in Taizhou to recruit merchants for salt licenses, who would then pay taxes and transport salt. However, as the salt pans in the Huainan region were gradually abolished and replaced by reclaimed farmland, Taizhou's economic structure underwent significant adjustment.

By the early 20th century, local merchant groups had expanded their influence, and chambers of commerce were established successively in Taizhou, Hai'an, and Jiangyan, making Taizhou one of the few county‑level jurisdictions in China to host three formal chambers of commerce within a single county. These chambers even organized their own armed security corps. In the 1911 Revolution, one such small armed force helped overthrow Qing rule in the locality.

During the Second Sino‑Japanese War, Li Changjiang, overall commander of guerrilla forces in the Jiangsu–Anhui border region, made Taizhou his headquarters. After submitting to the collaborationist Wang Jingwei regime, his forces were reorganized as the First Group Army. To the north, they clashed with troops loyal to the Nationalist government in Jiangsu under Han Deqin, while to the south they engaged the Central Jiangsu detachments of the New Fourth Army, which were active in neighboring Taixing.

On 21 January 1949, the People's Liberation Army entered Taizhou. On 23 April of the same year, the East China Military Region Navy was formally established at Baima Temple in Taizhou. Official narratives often regard this event as one of the founding moments of the People's Liberation Army Navy (PLAN), and Taizhou has accordingly been styled "the birthplace of the People's Navy."

=== People's Republic ===
After the founding of the People's Republic, the Administrative Office of Northern Jiangsu (Subei) was for a time located in Taizhou before being moved to Yangzhou. Subsequently, a county‑level Taizhou City was established for the urban area, while the surrounding rural area continued as Taixian (Tai County); the two units were merged in 1959 and separated again in 1962, both remaining under the jurisdiction of Yangzhou Prefecture. On the eve of Yangzhou's elevation to a prefecture‑level city in 1983, the economic scale of the two county‑level units was roughly comparable.

Thereafter, Taizhou functioned as a county‑level city under the newly established prefecture‑level Yangzhou. During this period, the local economy grew rapidly, and the city became a growing center of manufacturing, with Chunlan Group, then a dominant local enterprise, contributing close to half of Taizhou's industrial output by 1994.

Some scholars have argued that during this period there was a discrepancy between the administrative status of Taizhou and its level of economic development relative to Yangzhou. In 1996, the former county‑level Taizhou City was merged with Taixian, Taixing, Xinghua, and Jingjiang to form the present‑day prefecture‑level Taizhou.

== Administration and population ==
The prefecture-level city of Taizhou administers six county-level divisions, including two districts and four county-level cities.

These are further divided into 105 township-level divisions, including 91 towns, eight townships and six subdistricts.

Map
Subdivision	Hanzi	Pinyin	Population (2020)	Area (km^{2})	Density
City Proper
Hailing District	海陵区	Hǎilíng Qū	577,016	306.5	1,883
Suburban
Gaogang District	高港区	Gāogǎng Qū	258,590	281.7	918.0
Jiangyan District	姜堰区	Jiāngyàn Qū	668,408	857.5	779.5
Satellite cities (County-level cities)
Jingjiang	靖江市	Jìngjiāng Shì	663,408	665.2	997.3
Taixing	泰兴市	Tàixīng Shì	994,445	1,173	847.8
Xinghua	兴化市	Xīnghuà Shì	1,128,204	2,396	470.9
Total			4,512,762	5,799	778.2

At the end of 2019, the total household registration population was 5,005,500, and the birth population was 35,300 (birth rate 7.02%), a decrease of 1.37 thousand points from the previous year. 43,400 people died in 2019 (mortality rate 8.64%), an increase of 0.2 thousand points from the previous year. At the end of each year, the city's permanent population was 4,636,100, an increase of 400 over the previous year. At the end of 2019, the urbanization population of permanent residents reached 66.8%, an increase of 0.8 percentage points over the previous year.

== Geography ==
Taizhou lies at the confluence of the Yangtze River and the Jinghang Canal (Grand Canal of China), in the south-central Jiangsu Province, which is on the north bank of lower reaches of the Yangtze River, the south end of Jianghuai Plain. Its latitude ranges from about 32° 02′ — 33°11′ N and longitude 119° 38′ — 120° 32′ E, with a total area of 5,793 square kilometres (2,237 sq mi).

Neighbouring areas: Yangzhou to the west, Nantong to the east, and Yancheng to the north.

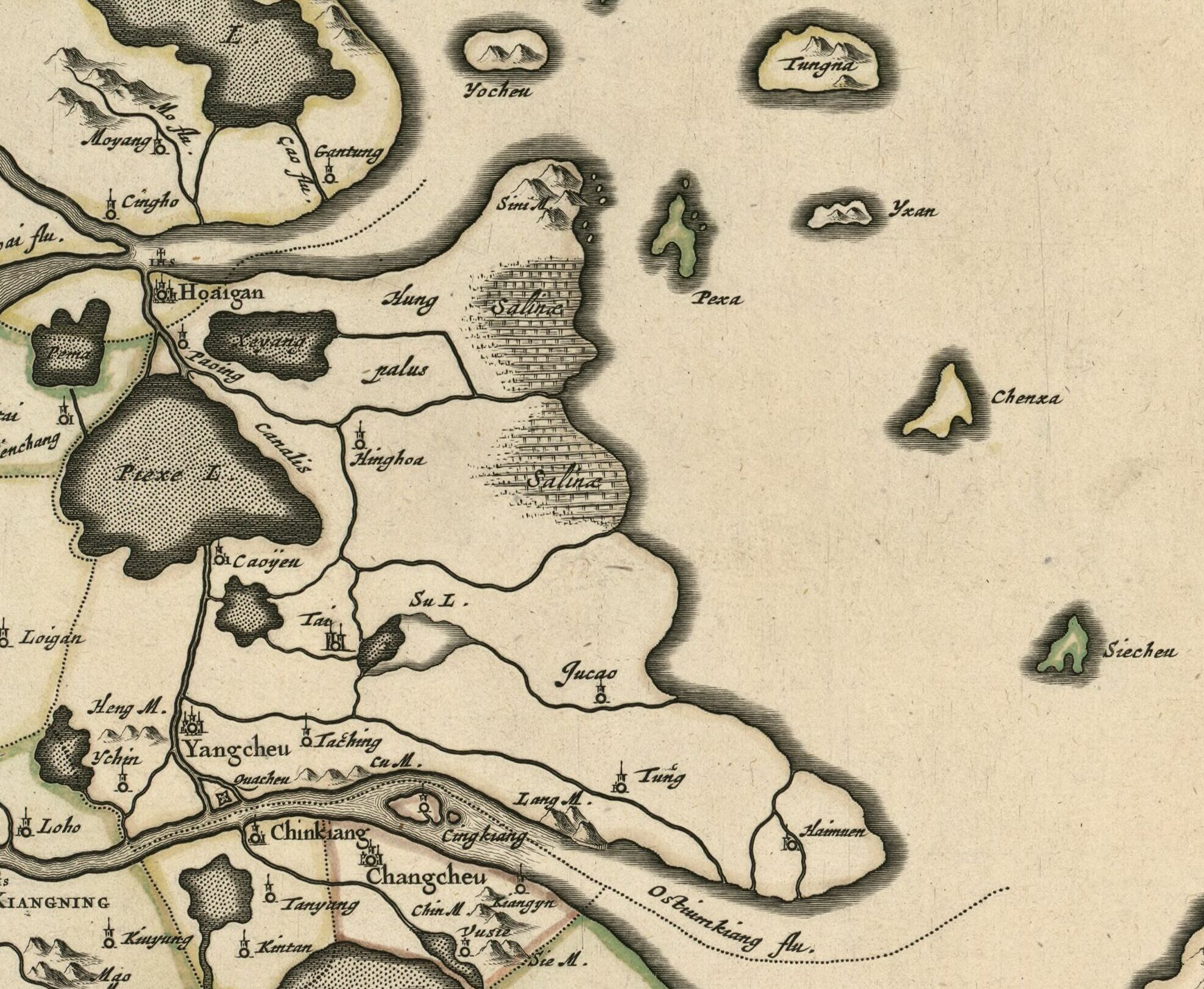
Taizhou

=== Climate ===
As with the rest of central and southern Jiangsu, Taizhou has a humid subtropical climate (Köppen Cfa), influenced by the East Asian Monsoon, with cold, damp, but comparatively dry, winters, and hot, humid summers with copious rain. The normal monthly mean temperature ranges from 2.4 °C (36.3 °F) in January to 27.5 °C (81.5 °F) in July, while the annual mean is 15.36 °C (59.6 °F). Nearly half of the mean annual rainfall of 1,037 mm (40.8 in) is distributed June to August.

Climate data for Taizhou, Jiangsu, elevation 3 m (9.8 ft), (1991–2020 normals, extremes 1955–present)
Month	Jan	Feb	Mar	Apr	May	Jun	Jul	Aug	Sep	Oct	Nov	Dec	Year
Record high °C (°F)	20.8 (69.4)	26.4 (79.5)	34.1 (93.4)	33.4 (92.1)	36.3 (97.3)	36.7 (98.1)	39.1 (102.4)	40.0 (104.0)	37.7 (99.9)	37.3 (99.1)	29.7 (85.5)	23.6 (74.5)	40.0 (104.0)
Mean daily maximum °C (°F)	6.8 (44.2)	9.4 (48.9)	14.1 (57.4)	20.5 (68.9)	25.9 (78.6)	28.8 (83.8)	31.9 (89.4)	31.3 (88.3)	27.5 (81.5)	22.4 (72.3)	16.1 (61.0)	9.5 (49.1)	20.3 (68.6)
Daily mean °C (°F)	2.8 (37.0)	4.9 (40.8)	9.2 (48.6)	15.1 (59.2)	20.6 (69.1)	24.4 (75.9)	27.9 (82.2)	27.4 (81.3)	23.3 (73.9)	17.8 (64.0)	11.4 (52.5)	5.2 (41.4)	15.8 (60.5)
Mean daily minimum °C (°F)	−0.3 (31.5)	1.5 (34.7)	5.3 (41.5)	10.6 (51.1)	16.2 (61.2)	20.8 (69.4)	24.7 (76.5)	24.5 (76.1)	20.1 (68.2)	14.1 (57.4)	7.8 (46.0)	1.9 (35.4)	12.3 (54.1)
Record low °C (°F)	−19.2 (−2.6)	−14.1 (6.6)	−9.5 (14.9)	−1.3 (29.7)	4.8 (40.6)	11.8 (53.2)	15.2 (59.4)	14.5 (58.1)	10.3 (50.5)	1.1 (34.0)	−6.6 (20.1)	−10.8 (12.6)	−19.2 (−2.6)
Average precipitation mm (inches)	44.7 (1.76)	45.7 (1.80)	76.8 (3.02)	67.0 (2.64)	89.1 (3.51)	159.8 (6.29)	199.3 (7.85)	168.7 (6.64)	85.4 (3.36)	57.5 (2.26)	51.9 (2.04)	36.6 (1.44)	1,082.5 (42.61)
Average precipitation days (≥ 0.1 mm)	8.1	8.2	9.9	9.1	9.9	11.0	13.1	12.3	8.3	7.4	7.8	6.9	112
Average snowy days	3.2	2.7	0.7	0	0	0	0	0	0	0	0.3	1.0	7.9
Average relative humidity (%)	74	74	72	71	72	78	82	83	80	75	75	74	76
Mean monthly sunshine hours	136.8	135.2	160.4	188.0	195.6	152.5	191.6	199.3	175.5	175.5	150.7	146.1	2,007.2
Percentage possible sunshine	43	43	43	48	46	36	44	49	48	50	48	47	45
Source: China Meteorological Administration, all-time extreme temperature

== Economy ==
Taizhou is a center for flour mills, textile works, fishing net manufacturing, and other industries based on local agriculture.

In the past 20 years, the economic growth has remained stable with an average annual growth rate exceeding 10%. It is one of the central cities inside the Yangtse River Delta with its developed industry, convenient transportation and prosperous commerce. In 2024, the GDP reached RMB 702.09 billion yuan, the GDP per capita RMB 156,351 yuan, equals to 21,954 dollars, the fiscal revenue RMB 37.5 billion yuan, the total amount of bank deposits RMB 688 billion yuan. Five county-level cities or districts are ranked among the "China's Top 100 Counties with Greatest Comprehensive Power". It boasts numbers of large-sized enterprises or groups, such as Chunlan Group Corp.

Taizhou was among the first few cities in Jiangsu to be recognized as having a famous cultural history. In 1990, Heheng village in Jiangyan County was awarded Global 500 Roll of Honor by the United Nations Environment Programme (UNEP) because of its success in protecting the environment while increasing the grain yield and its wide use of marsh biogas ponds.

Taizhou's China Medical City (CMC) is a specialized development zone located south of downtown Hailing district; it has attracted major international and domestic corporations who have established facilities here since its establishment in 2010. To date, more than 800 pharmaceutical enterprises have located businesses and incubation centers in CMC. Pharma companies include AstraZeneca, Takeda Pharmaceutical, Boehringer-Ingelheim, CSPC Pharmaceutical Group and Neptunus Pharmaceutical, as well as Yangtze River Pharmaceutical Company.

== International relations ==
=== Twin towns – Sister cities ===
Taizhou is twinned with:

Newport News, Virginia, United States; Latrobe, Victoria, Australia; Eumseong County, North Chungcheong, Republic of Korea; Huy, Belgium	Kotka, Finland (since 2001); Lower Hutt, New Zealand; Barrie, Ontario, Canada; Takasago, Japan

== Transportation ==
The G2 Beijing–Shanghai Expressway and Jiangsu Provincial Highway 29 (S29 Yancheng-Jingjiang Expressway; 盐靖高速公路) pass through the city from north to south, and Jiangsu Provincial Highway 28 (S28 Qidong-Yangzhou Expressway; 启扬高速公路) from west to east.

Taizhou Municipality has two Yangtze River crossings, the Taizhou Yangtze River Bridge from Gaogang District to Yangzhong and the Jiangyin Yangtze River Bridge from Jingjiang to Jiangyin.

The routes to get to Taizhou includes:

- Take buses from Shanghai or Nanjing through the G2 Beijing–Shanghai Expressway, which passes south of the city center.
- Take trains from Beijing through Xinyi–Changxing railway or Nanjing through Nanjing–Qidong railway

== Companies headquartered in Taizhou ==
- Chunlan Group Corp
- Linghai Motorcycle Corp
- Yangtze River Pharmaceutical Group
- Oberon Dishwashing Equipment Manufacturing Co. Ltd

== Tourism ==
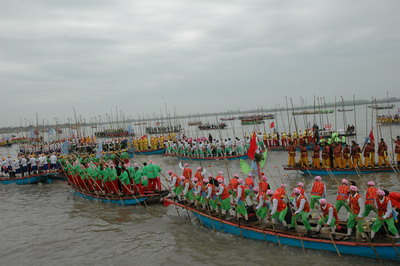
Qintong Boat Festival held in Jiangyan

- Gardens and Parks
  - Qintong Boat Festival, Jiangyan (溱潼会船节)

Qintong Boat Festival is held in Qingming (around April 4–6) every year. During the festival boats from nearby villages and towns converge on Xique Lake for a few days of rejoicing. Theatrical performances, dragon and lion dances, and other folk dances are staged right on board the boats.

  - Xique Lake, Jiangyan (喜鹊湖)

The lake located in Qingtong town, 15 kilometres (9 miles) north of Jiangyan city. The water comes from the Nanhu (南湖), Xique (喜鹊湖), and Beihu (北湖) rivers. It is part of Qintong Swamp.

  - Père David's Deer Reserve, Jiangyan (麋鹿故乡园)

Biggest reserve outside of Dafeng.

  - Taizhou Park
  - Heheng Agricultural Tour, Shengao, Jiangyan
- Museum
  - Navy Birthplace Museum
  - Hu Jintao Birthplace Museum, Jiangyan
  - Gao Ershi Museum, Jiangyan
  - Mei Lanfang Garden, opposite of 'Old Street'

== Colleges and schools ==
- Taizhou High School (江苏省泰州中学)
- Jingjiang High School (江苏省靖江中学)
- Taizhou No. 2 High School (江苏省泰州二中)
- Jiangyan High School (江苏省姜堰中学)
- Taixing High School (江苏省泰兴中学)
- Xinghua High School (江苏省兴化中学)
