= Gaogang, Taizhou =

Gaogang 高港区
- District
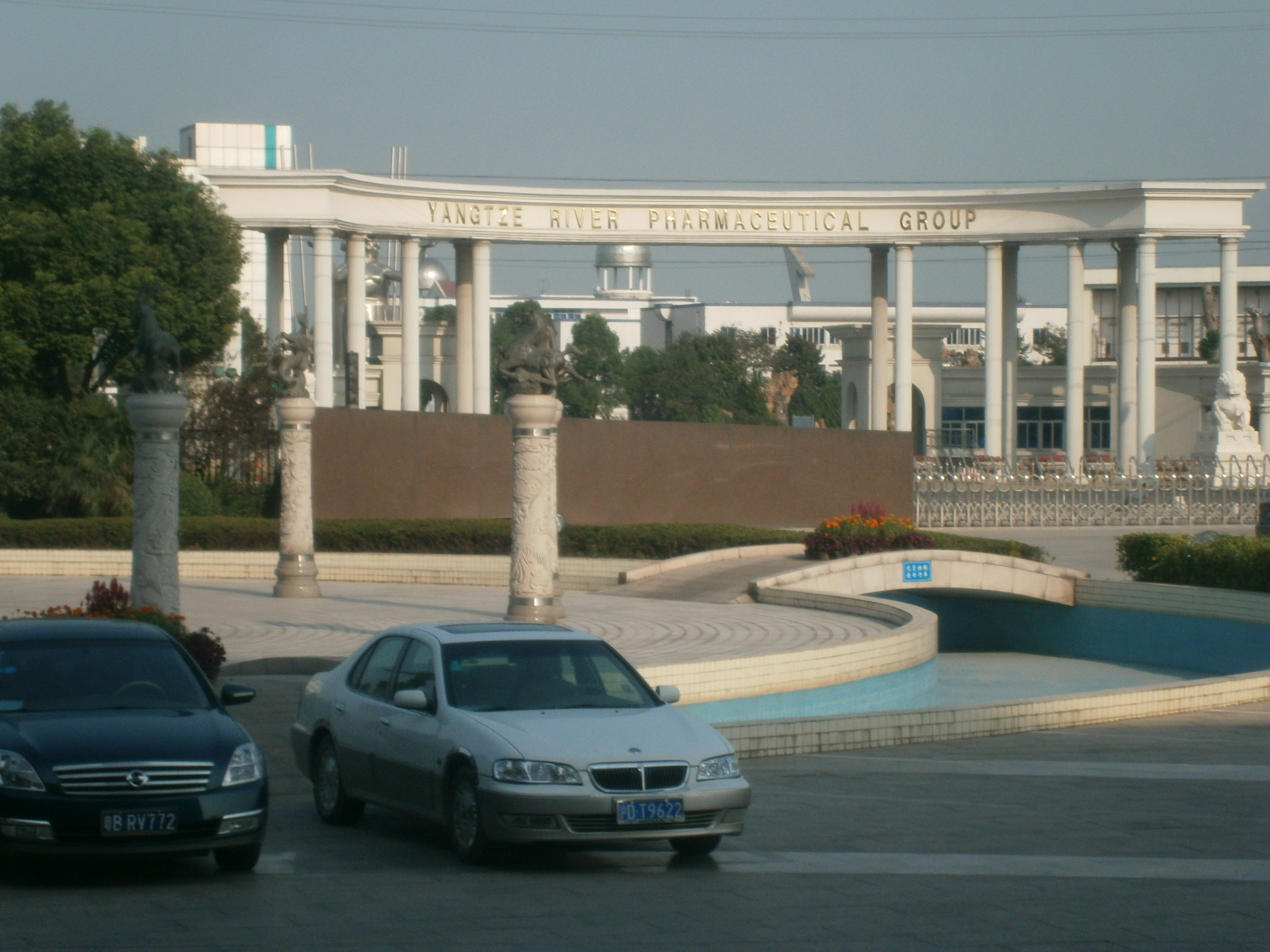

- Location in Jiangsu
- Coordinates: 32°18′07″N 119°53′00″E
- Country: People's Republic of China
- Province: Jiangsu
- Prefecture-level city: Taizhou

Area
  - Total: 286.83 km^{2} (110.75 sq mi)

Population (2019)
  - Total: 261,700
  - Density: 912.4/km^{2} (2,363/sq mi)
- Time zone: UTC+8 (China Standard)
- Postal code: 225321
- Division code: GGQ

Gaogang District (simplified Chinese: 高港区; traditional Chinese: 高港區; pinyin: Gāogǎng Qū; lit. 'high port') is one of three districts of Taizhou, Jiangsu province, China.

== Administrative divisions ==
At present, Gaogang District has 3 subdistricts and 5 towns.

3 subdistricts

- Kou'an (口岸街道)
- Diaopu (刁铺街道)
- Xuzhuang (许庄街道)

5 towns

- Yong'anzhou (永安洲镇)
- Baima (白马镇)
- Yexu (野徐镇)
- Huzhuang (胡庄镇)
- Dasi (大泗镇)
