= Yancheng =

Yancheng 盐城市 Yencheng
- Prefecture-level city
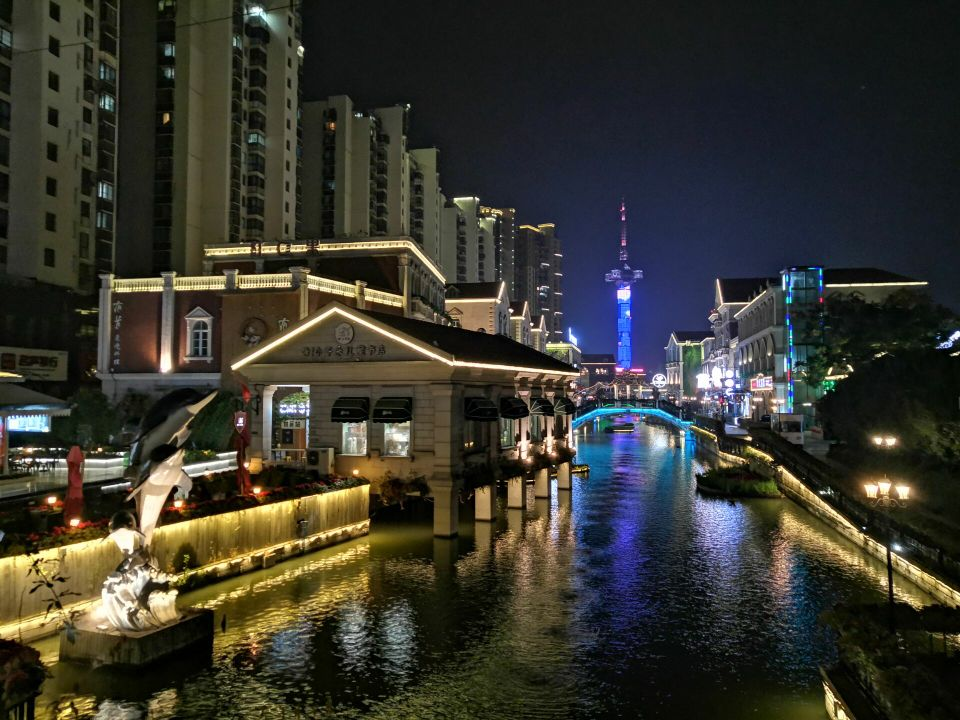
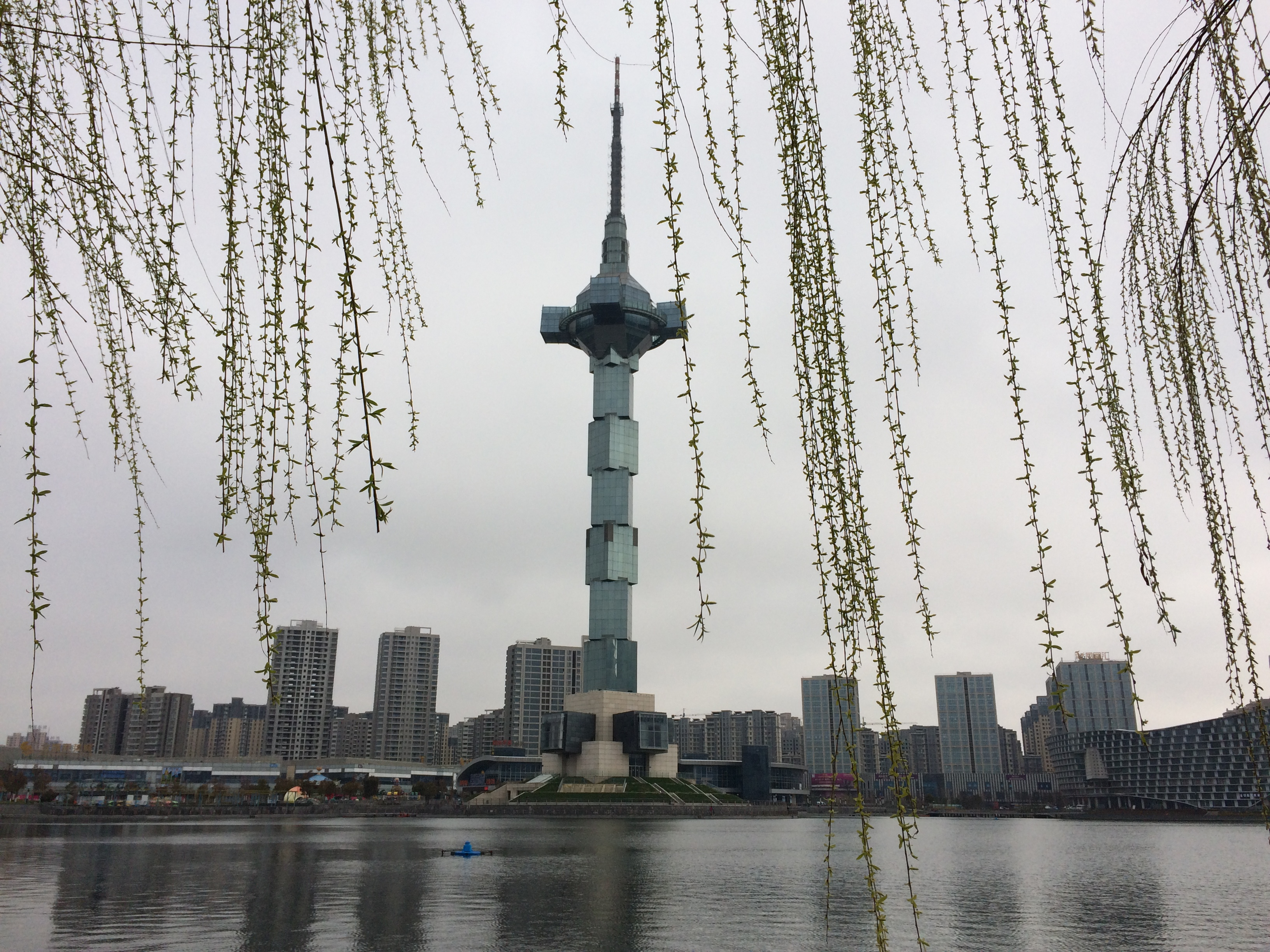
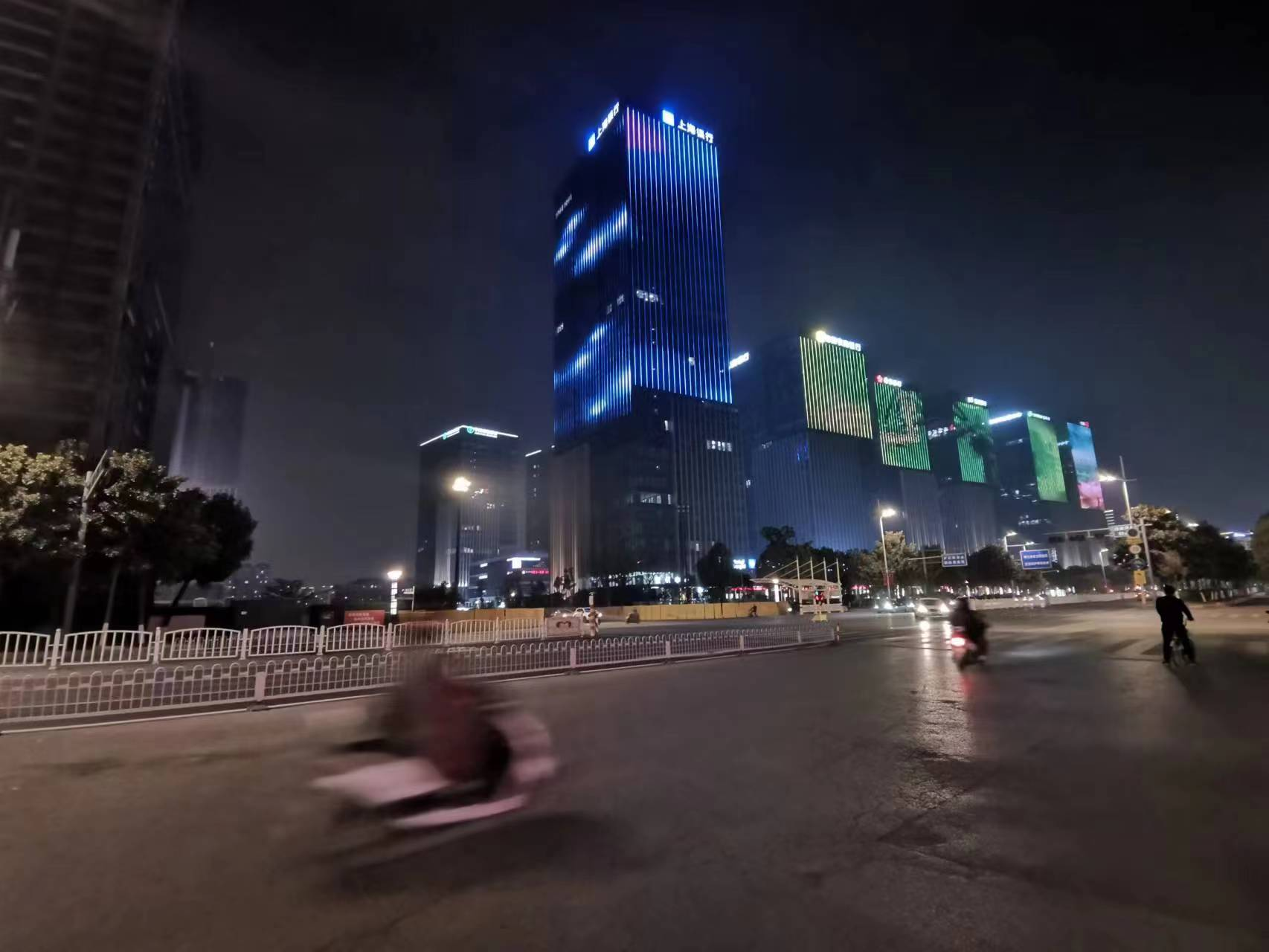
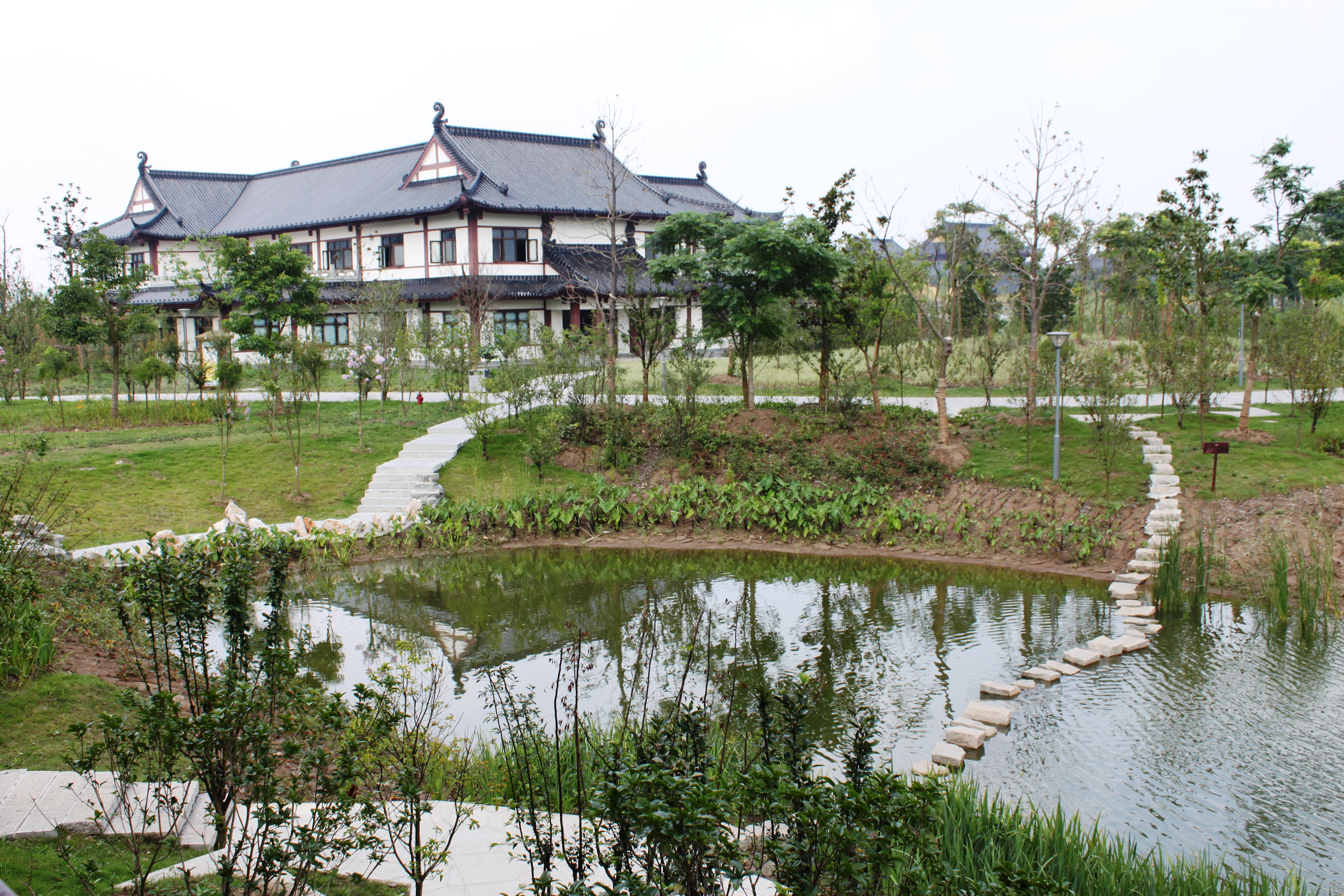
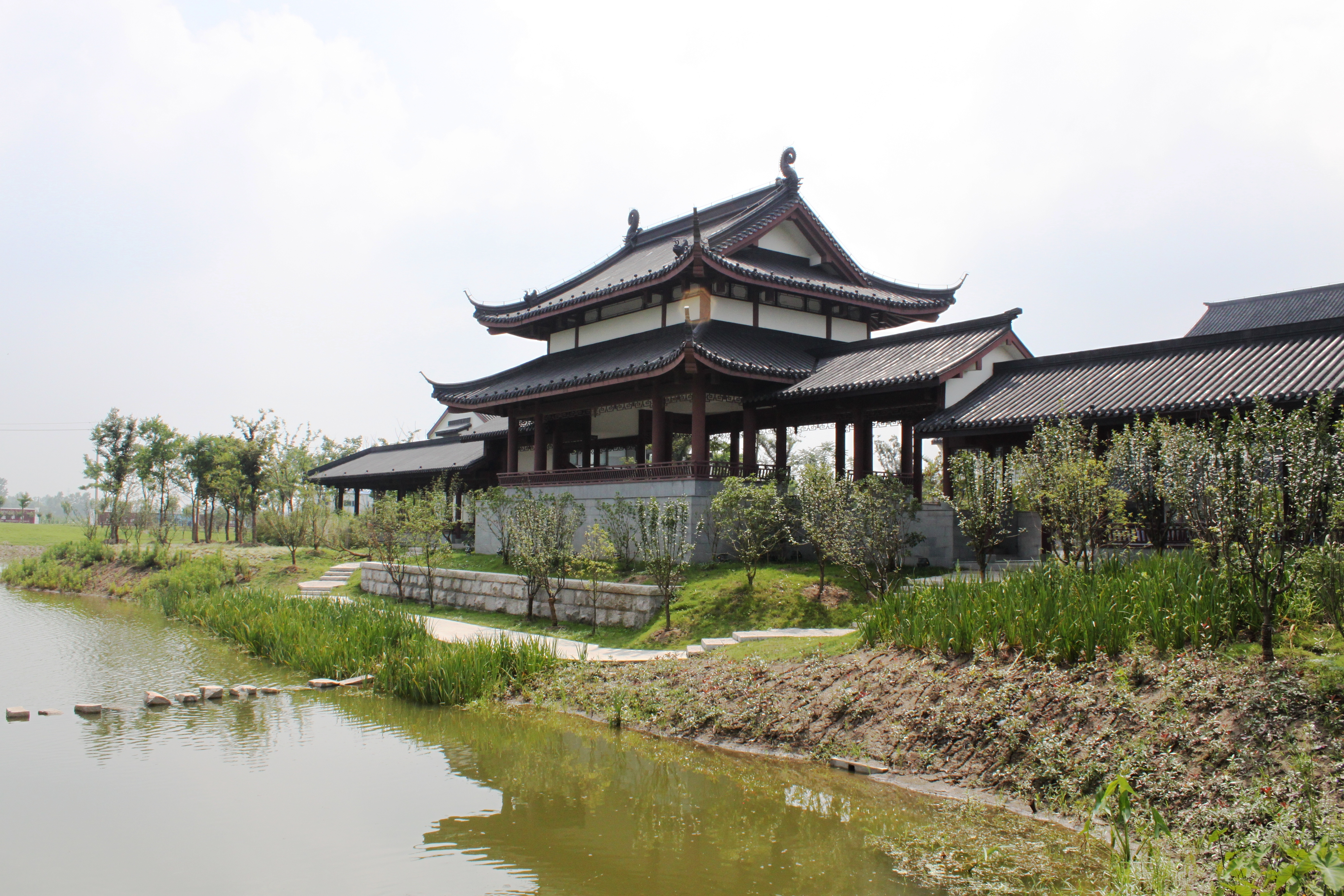
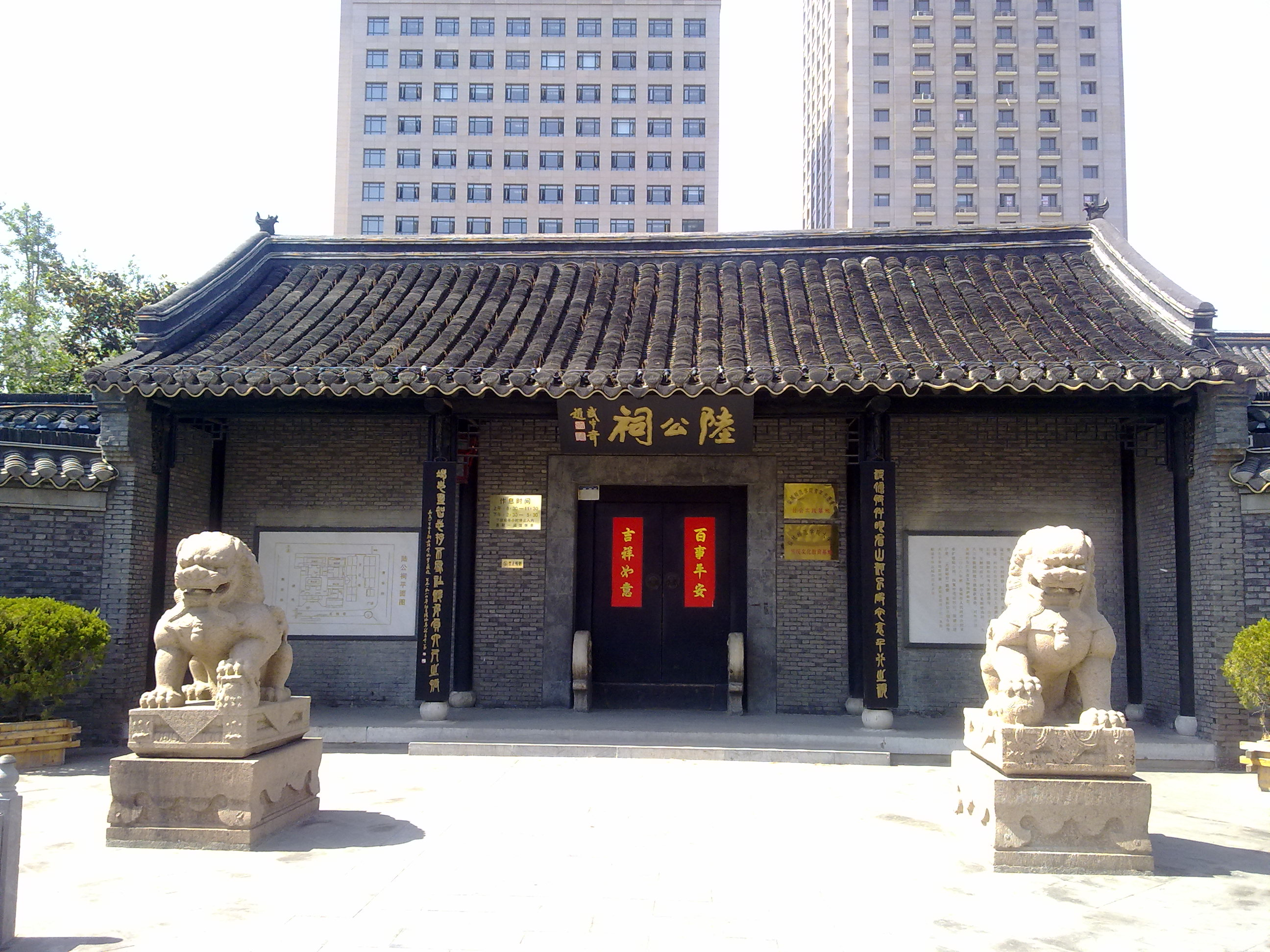
- Flower Street in Yancheng Yancheng TV Tower Bank of Jiangsu Yancheng Yancheng Monastery a second Yancheng Monastery Lu Xiufu Temple

- Yancheng is highlighted on this map

- Location in Jiangsu Yancheng (Eastern China) Yancheng (China)
- Coordinates (Yancheng municipal government): 33°21′00″N 120°09′25″E
- Country: People's Republic of China
- Province: Jiangsu
- Established: January 18, 1983
- Municipal seat: Yandu District

Government
  - Type: Prefecture-level city
  - CCP Committee Secretary: Zhu Kejiang (朱克江)
  - Mayor: Dai Yuan (戴源)

Area
  - Prefecture-level city: 16,920.83 km^{2} (6,533.17 sq mi)
  - Urban: 1,914 km^{2} (739 sq mi)

Population (2020)
  - Prefecture-level city: 6,709,629
  - Density: 396.5307/km^{2} (1,027.010/sq mi)
  - Urban: 2,379,194
  - Metro: 2,379,194

Languages
  - Native language: Jianghuai Mandarin

GDP
  - Prefecture-level city: CN¥ 778 trillion US$ 109.2 billion
  - Per capita: CN¥ 115,952; US$ 16,281
- Time zone: UTC+8 (China Standard)
- Postal code: 224000 (Urban center); 224100-224700 (Other areas)
- Area code: 515
- ISO 3166 code: CN-JS-09
- Major Nationalities: Han
- County-level divisions: 9
- Township-level divisions: 144
- License Plate Prefix: 苏J
- Website: www.yancheng.gov.cn
- Symbols
- Flower: Crape Myrtle; Peony
- Tree: Ligustrum; Ginkgo

Yancheng
- Simplified Chinese: 盐城
- Traditional Chinese: 鹽城
- Hanyu Pinyin: Yánchéng
- Literal meaning: Salt City
Transcriptions
Standard Mandarin
- Hanyu Pinyin: Yánchéng
Wu
- Romanization: yie^{平}zen^{平}
Yue: Cantonese
- Jyutping: jim^{4}sing^{4}

Yancheng (simplified Chinese: 盐城; traditional Chinese: 鹽城; pinyin: Yánchéng), formerly known as Yandu, is a prefecture-level city in the eastern coastal Jiangsu province, People's Republic of China. As the city with the largest jurisdictional area in Jiangsu, Yancheng borders Lianyungang to the north, Huai'an to the west, Yangzhou and Taizhou to the southwest, Nantong to the south, and the Yellow Sea to the east. Formerly a county, the current Yancheng city was founded on January 18, 1983.

Yancheng, literally "Salt City", is named after the salt harvest fields surrounding the city. According to historical records, collection and production of sea salt in the region began as early as 119 BC, during the Western Han dynasty, when the settlement on the current location of Yancheng was named Yandu County (盐渎县). According to the 2020 census, Yancheng had a registered population of 6,709,629, with 1,733,591 inhabitants in its built up area comprising the districts of Tinghu and Yandu.

== Administration ==
The prefecture-level city of Yancheng administers nine county-level divisions, including three districts, one county-level city and five counties. The population information here presented uses 2010 census data of permanent residents.

Map
Subdivision	Simplified Chinese	Hanyu Pinyin	Population (2020)	Area (km^{2})	Density (/km^{2})
City proper
Tinghu District	亭湖区	Tínghú Qū	901,007	1,012	890.3
Yandu District	盐都区	Yándū Qū	832,584	1,010	824.3
Suburban
Dafeng District	大丰区	Dàfēng Qū	645,603	2,786	231.7
Rural
Xiangshui County	响水县	Xiǎngshuǐ Xiàn	459,156	1,406	326.6
Binhai County	滨海县	Bīnhǎi Xiàn	820,084	1,935	423.8
Funing County	阜宁县	Fùníng Xiàn	794,036	1,440	551.4
Sheyang County	射阳县	Shèyáng Xiàn	759,403	2,571	295.4
Jianhu County	建湖县	Jiànhú Xiàn	609,346	1284	474.6
Satellite cities (County-level cities)
Dongtai City	东台市	Dōngtái Shì	888,410	2,420	367.1
Total			6,709,629	15,864	422.9

== History ==
Yancheng has a history of 2,100 years since the first canton was founded here in the Han dynasty at the year 119 BC. It was named for the salt reserves in rivers around the area, its name literally meaning "Salt City". In later years, the city was the home of Fan Zhongyan, the 12th century statesman and Shi Nai'an, the reputed author of famous novels.

Yancheng was in the limelight during the Chinese Civil War from the 1930s to 1940s. The New Fourth Army led by the Chinese Communist Party was reestablished in Yancheng after being ambushed and battered by the enemy. After the revival, the Army played an important role in the war and finally the foundation of the People's Republic of China. Monuments in honor of these heroes can still be found around Yancheng.

=== Chenjiagang Chemical Industry Park explosions ===
A major fire and explosion accident happened in March 2019, killing 78 people and severely injuring at least 94. Around 640 people required hospital treatment and were taken to 16 hospitals. The facility—located in Yancheng's industrial park—was operated by Tianjiayi Chemical (江苏天嘉宜化工有限公司), and was used to produce fertilizer or pesticides. Tianjiayi Chemical had previously been penalized six times for infractions of pollution and waste management laws, and China Daily reported fines over safety issues. According to the South China Morning Post, this plant paid bribes, paid journalists and local officials so this chemical plant could remain open without any negative publicity or reasons to shut down.

On 27 November 2007, an explosion occurred in one of the chemical factories in Chenjiagang Chemical Zone (陈家港生态化工园区), with seven killed and around 50 injured. On 23 November 2010, more than thirty were poisoned by a toxic gas release. In the early morning of 11 February 2011, rumors of toxic chemical release and potential imminent explosions in the Chenjiagang Chemical Industry Park led over ten thousand residents to evacuate in panic from the towns of Chenjiagang and Shuanggang (双港镇) during which four people died and many were injured. On the afternoon of May 18 and again on July 26, 2011, there were explosions at local factories.

== Geography ==
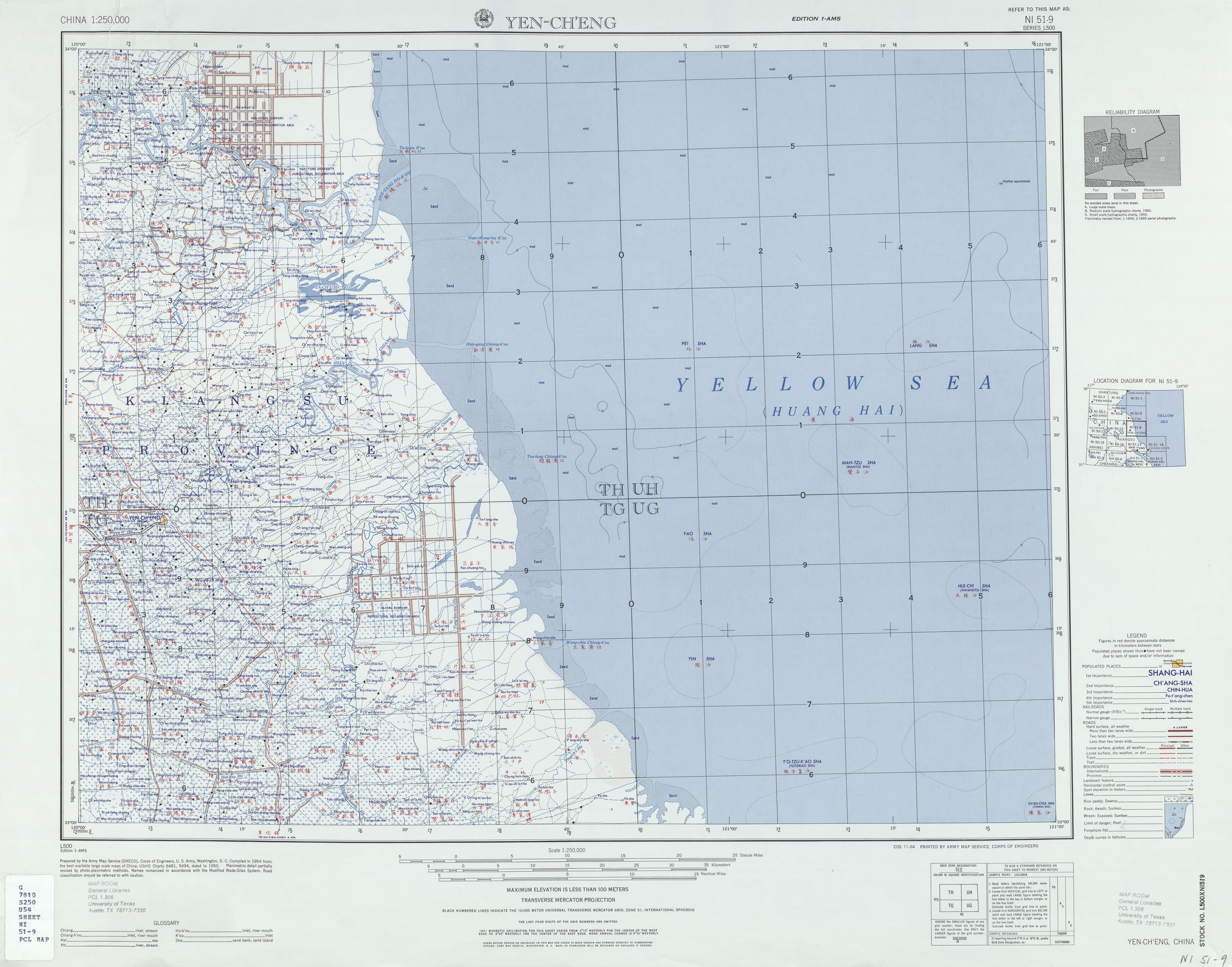
Yancheng (labelled as YEN-CH'ENG 𥂁城) (1954)

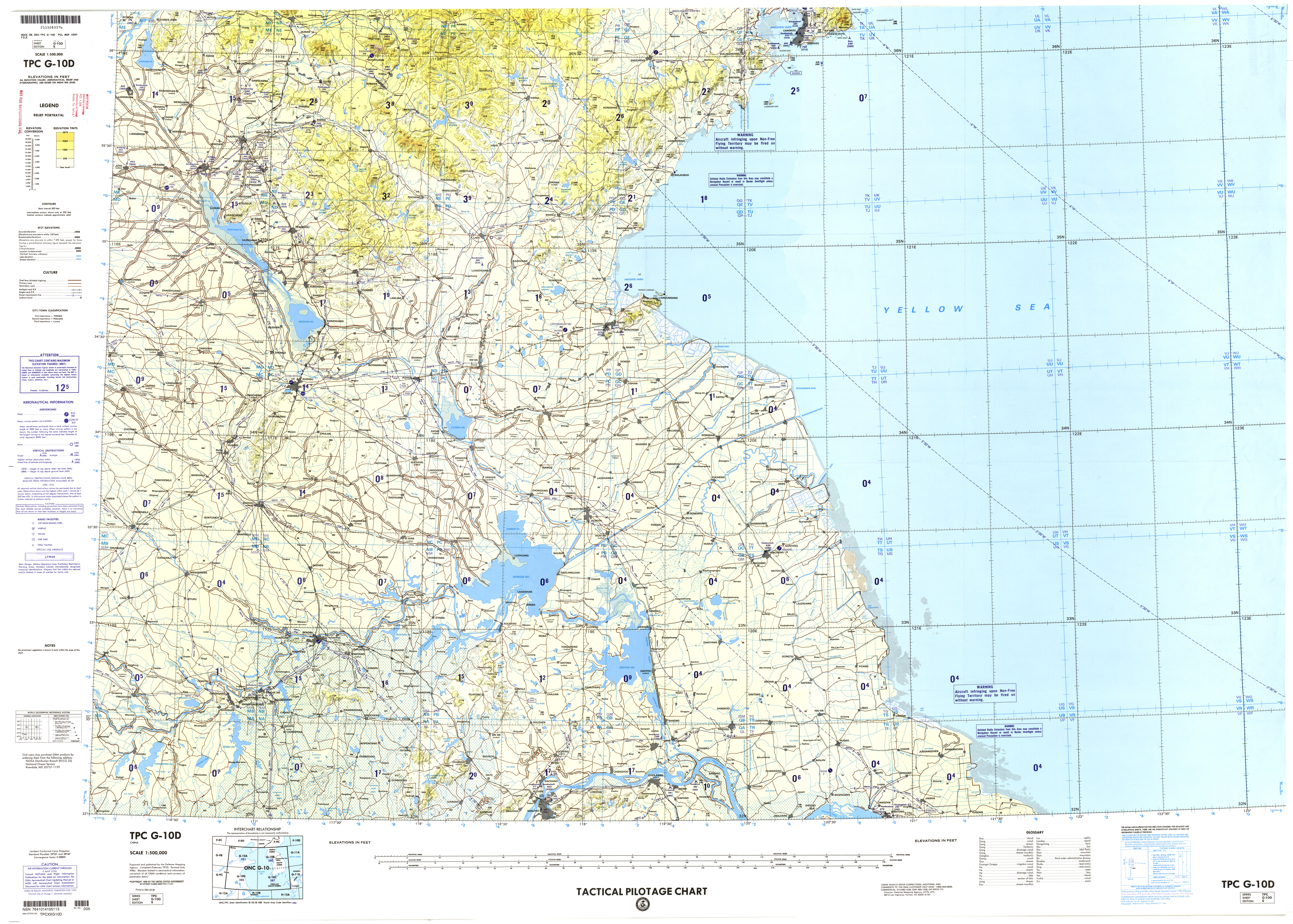
Map including Yancheng and surrounding region

Yancheng occupies roughly 582 km (362 mi) of coastline, more than half of the whole province. By the end of the Mesolithic period, the marine transgressions changed almost of the area into a shallow bay. Continued deposition of silt carried by the Yangtze River and the Huai River extend its coast to the east gradually. Since 1128, the course of the Yellow River have changed to join up with the Huai River. The change has accelerated.

=== Climate ===
Typical of northern and central Jiangsu, Yancheng has a humid subtropical climate (Köppen Cfa/Cwa), strongly influenced by the East Asian Monsoon. The normal monthly mean temperature ranges from 1.7 °C (35.1 °F) in January to 26.9 °C (80.4 °F) in July, with the annual mean at 14.68 °C (58.4 °F). A majority of the mean annual precipitation of 1,002 mm (39.4 in) is distributed in June thru August.

Climate data for Yancheng, elevation 4 m (13 ft), (1991–2020 normals, extremes 1969–present)
Month	Jan	Feb	Mar	Apr	May	Jun	Jul	Aug	Sep	Oct	Nov	Dec	Year
Record high °C (°F)	19.9 (67.8)	25.0 (77.0)	32.6 (90.7)	32.5 (90.5)	35.4 (95.7)	37.2 (99.0)	37.9 (100.2)	38.1 (100.6)	36.1 (97.0)	31.4 (88.5)	27.3 (81.1)	20.2 (68.4)	38.1 (100.6)
Mean daily maximum °C (°F)	6.4 (43.5)	8.8 (47.8)	13.5 (56.3)	19.8 (67.6)	25.2 (77.4)	28.5 (83.3)	31.1 (88.0)	30.7 (87.3)	27.1 (80.8)	22.2 (72.0)	15.7 (60.3)	8.9 (48.0)	19.8 (67.7)
Daily mean °C (°F)	2.0 (35.6)	4.0 (39.2)	8.3 (46.9)	14.2 (57.6)	19.8 (67.6)	23.7 (74.7)	27.3 (81.1)	26.9 (80.4)	22.8 (73.0)	17.2 (63.0)	10.8 (51.4)	4.3 (39.7)	15.1 (59.2)
Mean daily minimum °C (°F)	−1.2 (29.8)	0.4 (32.7)	4.2 (39.6)	9.5 (49.1)	15.2 (59.4)	20.0 (68.0)	24.2 (75.6)	24.0 (75.2)	19.4 (66.9)	13.3 (55.9)	7.0 (44.6)	0.9 (33.6)	11.4 (52.5)
Record low °C (°F)	−13.5 (7.7)	−17.3 (0.9)	−6.4 (20.5)	−0.3 (31.5)	5.2 (41.4)	11.1 (52.0)	17.5 (63.5)	17.5 (63.5)	10.6 (51.1)	2.2 (36.0)	−4.5 (23.9)	−10.2 (13.6)	−17.3 (0.9)
Average precipitation mm (inches)	31.9 (1.26)	33.2 (1.31)	53.1 (2.09)	49.9 (1.96)	78.0 (3.07)	138.5 (5.45)	220.8 (8.69)	182.9 (7.20)	84.5 (3.33)	48.1 (1.89)	53.3 (2.10)	30.1 (1.19)	1,004.3 (39.54)
Average precipitation days (≥ 0.1 mm)	6.7	7.5	8.3	7.7	9.3	9.1	13.2	12.0	8.2	6.3	7.2	5.9	101.4
Average snowy days	2.8	2.4	0.9	0	0	0	0	0	0	0	0.3	0.8	7.2
Average relative humidity (%)	73	73	72	72	73	78	83	84	80	75	75	72	76
Mean monthly sunshine hours	141.0	144.2	175.0	200.7	207.3	162.5	175.9	194.2	177.7	181.0	151.0	150.0	2,060.5
Percentage possible sunshine	44	46	47	51	48	38	40	47	48	52	49	49	47
Source: China Meteorological Administration all-time extreme temperature All-time September high

== Transportation ==
=== Road ===
==== Expressways ====
- G15 Shenyang–Haikou Expressway
- G1515 Yancheng–Jingjiang Expressway
- G1516 Yancheng–Luoyang Expressway

==== National Highway ====
- China National Highway 204

=== Railway ===
Yancheng railway station is served by the Xinyi–Jingjiang railway (the northern section of the Xinyi–Changxing railway), the Qingdao–Yancheng railway, the Xuzhou–Yancheng high-speed railway, and the Yancheng–Nantong high-speed railway.

=== Buses ===
The BRT system of Yancheng uses a dedicated bus lane on a 16 km (9.9 mi) route and as of 2010 carries 33,000 passengers per day. The first line went into service in 2010.

The Yancheng District SRT Line 1 began testing in March 2021 and officially opened for trial operation on 16 April 2021 with a 17-station, 13 km (8.1 mi) route. The line uses the Autonomous Rail Rapid Transit system with four-segment 320 passenger guided vehicles. During the trial operation, the B3 line of Yancheng City Public Transport Company will run on the same line as the SRT.

=== Air ===
Yancheng Nanyang International Airport now flies directly to Shanghai and Beijing, as well as flying directly to Hong Kong, Taiwan, South Korea, Japan and so on.

== Education ==
=== Universities and colleges ===
- Yancheng Institute of Technology
- Yancheng Teachers University

=== High schools ===
- Jiangsu Yancheng Wuyou Senior High School
- Jiangsu Yancheng Middle School
- Jiangsu Yancheng Jingshan Middle School
- Tinghu High School of Jiangsu Province
- Jiangsu Funing Middle School
- Jiangsu Yancheng NO.1 Middle School

== Tourism ==
Outdoor activities include the Yancheng wetlands and salt marshes, home to some unique and endangered species, including Père David's deer and the red-crowned crane. There is also a famous food street in east road springing up in recent years in which there are a number of restaurants in the style of Huizhou architecture.

== Notable people ==
- Cao Wenxuan - children's author
- Hau Pei-tsun
- Hu Qiaomu
- Lu Xiufu
- Luo Xiaojuan
- Qiao Guanhua
- Taylor Wang
- Wei Yi
- Xu Sihai – purple tea pot expert and curator
- Yang Chaoyue

== Sister cities and twin towns ==
Yancheng is twinned with the following domestic and foreign cities and towns.

=== Domestic ===
- Turpan, Xinjiang
- Taiyuan, Shanxi
- Yanbei Prefecture, Shanxi
- Qinzhou, Guangxi
- Wuxi, Jiangsu
- Xicheng District, Beijing
- Zhuhai, Guangdong
- Qinhuangdao, Hebei
- Jilin, Jilin
- Yan'an, Shaanxi
- Yangjia, Shanxi, Shanxi
- Haikou, Hainan
- Dachuan, Sichuan
- Changning District, Shanghai
- Lhasa, Tibet
- Dandong, Liaoning
- Xuhui District, Shanghai

=== International ===
- Chieti, Italy (1992)
- Namwon, South Korea (1998)
- Deva, Romania (1998)
- Kashima, Japan (2002)
- San Diego, United States (2003)
- Čakovec, Croatia (2022)

In addition, the county-level city of Dafeng, administered by Yancheng, is also twinned with Ascoli Piceno, Italy (September 2001) and Guri, South Korea (February 20, 2003) respectively.
