= Suining railway station =

Suining railway station may refer to:

- Suining railway station (Jiangsu) (Chinese: 睢宁站)
- Suining railway station (Sichuan) (Chinese: 遂宁站)
