= Xiadang Township =

Xiadang Township 下党乡
- Township
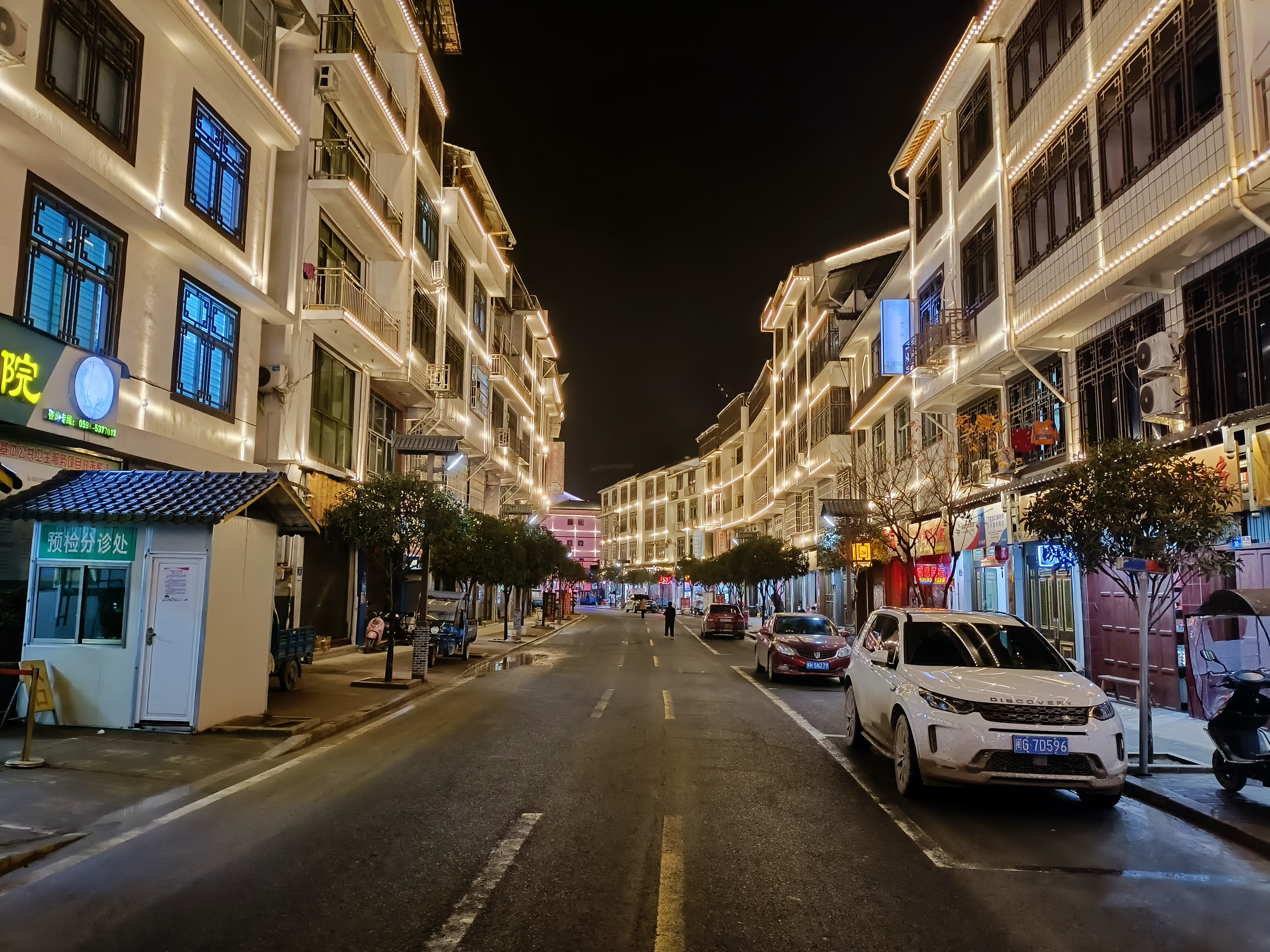

- Location in Fujian
- Coordinates: 27.2441°N 119.1830°E
- Country: China
- Province: Fujian
- Prefecture-level city: Ningde
- County: Shouning
- Established: 1987
- Time zone: UTC+8 (China Standard)

Xiadang Township is a township under the administration of Shouning in Fujian province, China.

== History ==
Xiadang Township was separated from Pingxi Township in 1987. When Xi Jinping was the secretary of the Ningde Prefectural Committee of the Chinese Communist Party (CCP), he visited Xiadang three times. After becoming CCP general secretary, Xi Jinping called Xiadang "a place I will never forget in my life". The area was then built into the "Unforgettable Xiadang" red tourism attraction. The Fujian Provincial People's Government built a number of buildings with praise for Xi, such as the "Learning Base" and "Learning Road". Many large-scale posters of Xi Jinping's quotations, portraits, and replies were hung in many places. The township government, public security and other institutions were moved to the new site, while the old site was retained in its original state in the Xiadang Old Village Scenic Area. In July 2021, Xiadang Township became one of the five sub-venues of the CPC and World Political Parties Summit.

== Administrative divisions ==
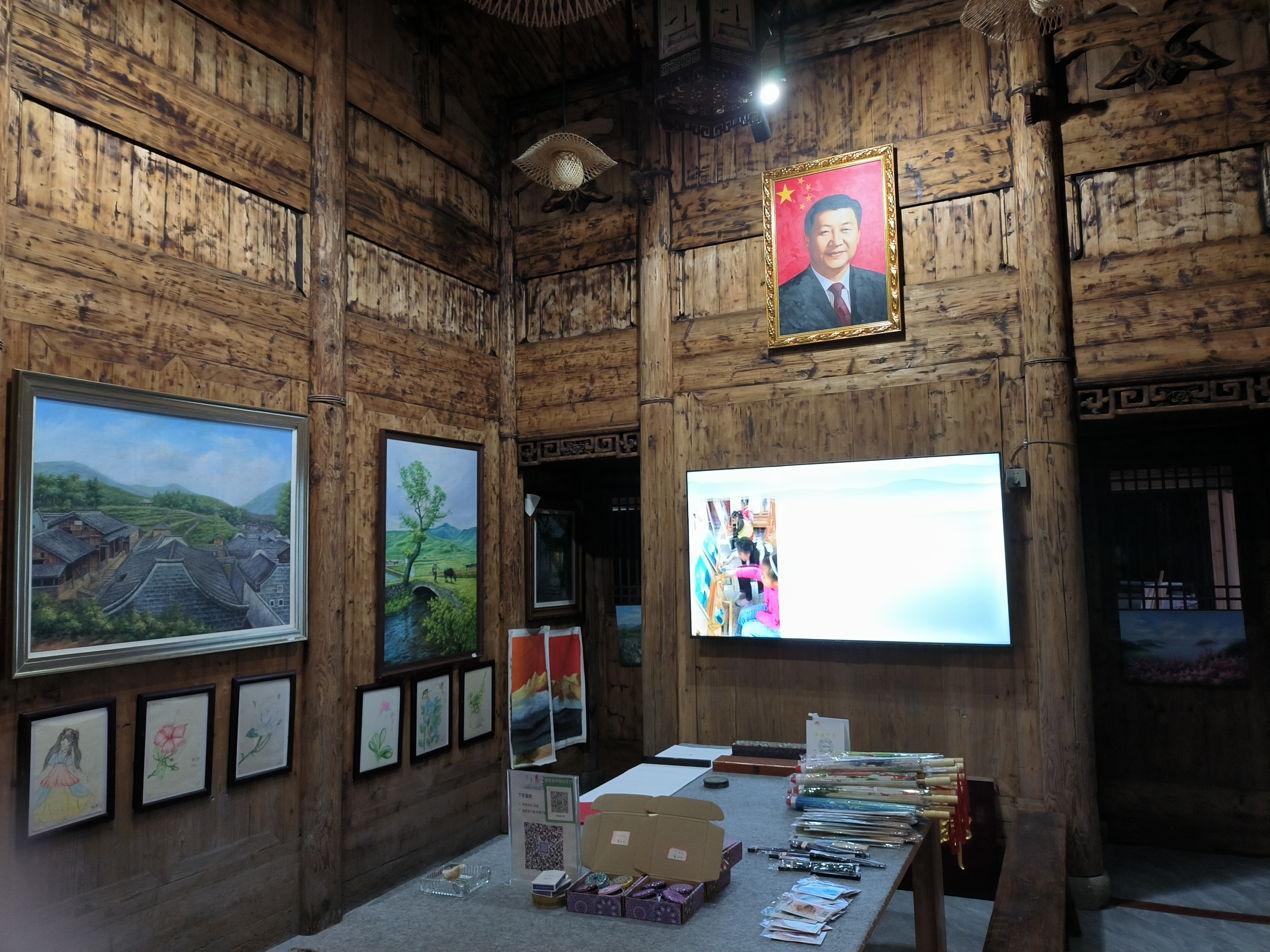
Xidang Art Garden in the Xiadang Ancient Village Scenic Area in January 2023, with a portrait of Xi Jinping framed with the Chinese national flag

Xiadang Township has the following administrative divisions:

Xiadang Village, Shangdang Village, Xishan Village, Caokeng Village, Xiapingfeng Village, Gelong Village, Beikeng Village, Yangxitou Village, Ganghou Village and Beikengshan Village.

== Natural environment ==
Xia Dang Township has a mid-subtropical mountain climate, with an average annual temperature of 16.9°C and an average annual rainfall of 1514 mm. It has high mountains, vast forests, few farmlands, and a relatively low population density.
