= 南陽 =

南陽 (Namyang in Korean, Nan'yō in Japanese), or 南阳 (Simplified Chinese for Nányáng) may refer to:

== China ==
- Nanyang, Henan, prefecture-level city in the southwest of that province
- Nanyang Commandery, a historical region centered in Nanyang City
- Nanyang Town (disambiguation)
- Nanyang Lake, one of the Nansi Lakes in southwestern Shandong

== Japan ==
- Nan'yō, Yamagata, city in Yamagata Prefecture
- Nan'yō-Shiyakusho Station, railway station in Nan'yō, Yamagata
- Nan'yō Yasumoto (1905–1977 安本 南陽), photographer

== Korea ==
- Namyang Dairy Products, a South Korean dairy company
- Namyang Workers' District
- Hwaseong, formerly named Namyang

== See also ==
- Nanyang (disambiguation), for other articles not represented by 南陽 when written with Chinese characters
