= Suining County, Jiangsu =

Suining 睢宁县
- County
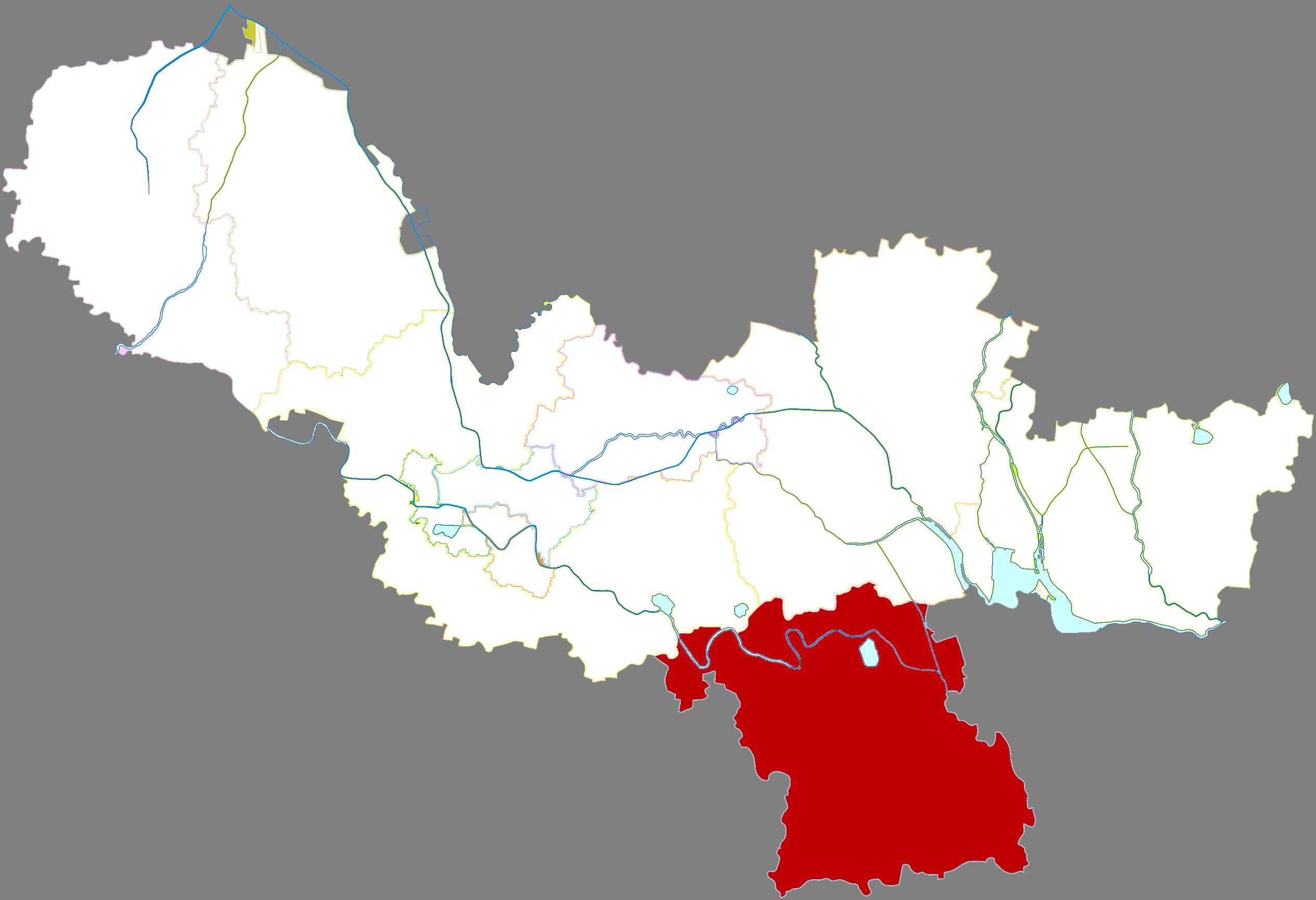
- Location in Xuzhou

- Location of the seat in Jiangsu
- Coordinates: 33°56′28″N 117°51′11″E
- Country: People's Republic of China
- Province: Jiangsu
- Prefecture-level city: Xuzhou

Area
  - Total: 1,769 km^{2} (683 sq mi)

Population (2020)
  - Total: 1,088,553
  - Density: 615.3/km^{2} (1,594/sq mi)
- Time zone: UTC+8 (China Standard)
- Postal Code: 221200
- Website: www.cnsn.gov.cn

Suining County (simplified Chinese: 睢宁县; traditional Chinese: 睢寧縣; pinyin: Suīníng Xiàn; Wade–Giles: Sui-ning) is under the administration of Xuzhou, Jiangsu province, China; it is the southernmost county-level division of Xuzhou and borders the prefecture-level cities of Suqian to the east and Suzhou of Anhui to the south and west.

== History ==
During the Han dynasty, the area was administered as Suiling (睢陵) county. Suiling was abolished in the medieval period, merged into Suqian, and re-established as Suining in 1218. It remained under Pizhou's jurisdiction for centuries, following Pizhou's transfer from Huai'an to Xuzhou in 1724.

To its northwest was the ancient city of Xiapi (下邳), the older seat of Pizhou, which was largely abandoned due to recurrent Yellow River flooding; consequently, Pizhou relocated its seat northward and transferred the town to Suining. Proximity to the abandoned Yellow River caused frequent flooding. The county seat was relocated after being submerged in 1624, and dyke breaches continued through the 18th century, notably in 1781 when floodwaters discharged into Hongze Lake.

In the mid-19th century, local self-defense efforts against the Nian Rebellion led to the construction of over a hundred fortified villages. During the 1850s, local authorities promoted the textile industry. With the influx of imported yarn in the late 19th century, local hand-loomed cloth production grew from 38,000 bolts in the 1910s, to 280,000 by the early 1930s. Agriculture also saw increased commercialization during this period; notably, the proportion of land devoted to peanut cultivation reached 52% by 1924.

Following the 1911 Revolution, the Republican Party dominated the county assembly. Local leadership was concentrated among the Zhuo, Yuan, Wang, and Xia families. A local provincial assembly member, Xia Zonghan (夏宗翰), and his two brothers each owned about 5,000 mu (824 acres) of land. Between 1915 and 1930, local diding tax and its attendant surcharges increased 3.5 times. In the 1920s, the local Nationalist Party (KMT) organized militias, initiated rent-reduction campaigns by mobilizing the Red Spear Society; they led a large-scale tax resistance movement involving tens of thousands of peasants in 1925.

During much of the period from 1927 through 1929, the Suining KMT was frequently under pressure by the county government, local elites, Sword Society members, and sometimes all three acting in concert. In April 1929, a newly appointed county magistrate purged the local KMT branch, replacing members with his own supporters. Following central KMT intervention, the magistrate was dismissed that autumn, though local party factionalism continued.

In the summer of 1937, the 110th Division of the Northeastern Army was deployed and stationed in the county. After the Battle of Xuzhou, the Japanese army captured the county seat in November 1938. In the late 1930s, local armed leader Xia Shuowu (夏碩武) integrated approximately 2,000 men from various bands into a National Revolutionary Army regiment before defecting to the Japanese military. He subsequently became the collaborationist county magistrate.

During the Second Sino-Japanese War, the Chinese Communist Party (CCP) operated in the region. The CCP successfully mobilized and gathered thousands of people at rallies in the northern Pi-Sui-Tong (Pizhou-Suining-Tongshan) border area but remained limited in the southern Si-Ling-Sui (Sixian-Lingbi-Suining) area, where local KMT forces occasionally coordinated with Japanese-aligned troops. The CCP's New Fourth Army took control of the Suining county seat in July 1945. Nationalist control was restored in September 1945, followed by the CCP's final capture of the county in November 1948.

In 1953, the county was placed under Xuzhou Prefecture. Historically an agricultural area, the county became a source of migrant labor, following the post-1978 reforms. This long-term demographic outflow was partially counteracted in the mid-2000s by the emergence of rural e-commerce, which stimulated the growth of local logistics and furniture manufacturing.

== Administration ==
Suining County is divided into 3 subdistricts and 15 towns.

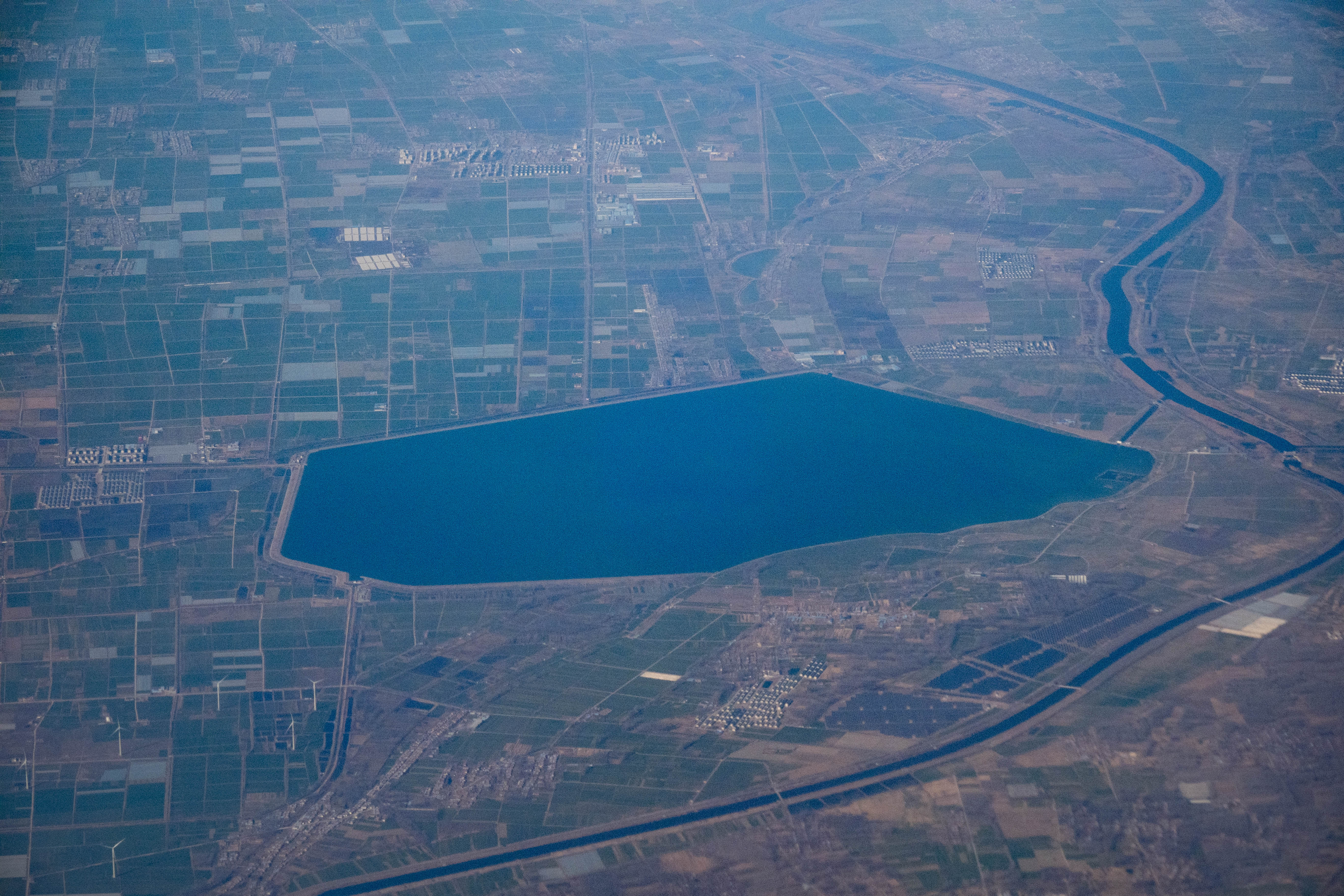
Aerial view of Qing'an Reservoir in February 2023. The meandering course of the Abandoned Yellow River is visible surrounding the reservoir.

3 subdistricts

- Suicheng (睢城街道)
- Jincheng (金城街道)
- Suihe (睢河街道)

15 towns

- Wangji (王集镇)
- Shuanggou (双沟镇)
- Lanshan (岚山镇)
- Liji (李集镇)
- Taoyuan (桃园镇)
- Guanshan (官山镇)
- Gaozuo (高作镇)
- Shaji (沙集镇)
- Lingcheng (凌城镇)
- Qiuji (邱集镇)
- Gupi (古邳镇)
- Yaoji (姚集镇)
- Weiji (魏集镇)
- Liangji (梁集镇)
- Qing'an (庆安镇)

== Climate ==
Climate data for Suining, elevation 24 m (79 ft), (1991–2020 normals, extremes 1981–present)
Month	Jan	Feb	Mar	Apr	May	Jun	Jul	Aug	Sep	Oct	Nov	Dec	Year
Record high °C (°F)	17.6 (63.7)	26.0 (78.8)	33.1 (91.6)	32.7 (90.9)	37.2 (99.0)	38.8 (101.8)	39.1 (102.4)	38.0 (100.4)	36.3 (97.3)	33.8 (92.8)	28.3 (82.9)	20.8 (69.4)	39.1 (102.4)
Mean daily maximum °C (°F)	5.8 (42.4)	9.0 (48.2)	14.5 (58.1)	21.0 (69.8)	26.1 (79.0)	30.0 (86.0)	31.4 (88.5)	30.6 (87.1)	27.1 (80.8)	22.1 (71.8)	14.9 (58.8)	8.1 (46.6)	20.1 (68.1)
Daily mean °C (°F)	1.1 (34.0)	4.0 (39.2)	9.1 (48.4)	15.4 (59.7)	20.7 (69.3)	24.9 (76.8)	27.4 (81.3)	26.6 (79.9)	22.2 (72.0)	16.4 (61.5)	9.6 (49.3)	3.2 (37.8)	15.0 (59.1)
Mean daily minimum °C (°F)	−2.3 (27.9)	0.2 (32.4)	4.6 (40.3)	10.3 (50.5)	15.8 (60.4)	20.5 (68.9)	24.1 (75.4)	23.5 (74.3)	18.5 (65.3)	12.1 (53.8)	5.4 (41.7)	−0.5 (31.1)	11.0 (51.8)
Record low °C (°F)	−13.5 (7.7)	−16.7 (1.9)	−8.2 (17.2)	−0.7 (30.7)	4.4 (39.9)	11.6 (52.9)	17.5 (63.5)	14.3 (57.7)	6.7 (44.1)	−1.3 (29.7)	−7.4 (18.7)	−16.3 (2.7)	−16.7 (1.9)
Average precipitation mm (inches)	21.5 (0.85)	26.4 (1.04)	40.9 (1.61)	45.0 (1.77)	72.8 (2.87)	128.7 (5.07)	220.4 (8.68)	181.6 (7.15)	87.5 (3.44)	45.2 (1.78)	36.3 (1.43)	19.0 (0.75)	925.3 (36.44)
Average precipitation days (≥ 0.1 mm)	5.0	5.9	6.6	7.0	7.6	8.6	13.2	11.4	7.8	5.6	6.1	4.6	89.4
Average snowy days	3.3	2.5	1.1	0	0	0	0	0	0	0	0.6	1.5	9
Average relative humidity (%)	69	67	64	65	69	72	82	83	79	73	71	69	72
Mean monthly sunshine hours	139.6	140.9	179.5	203.7	210.6	180.0	177.3	177.3	172.9	171.3	148.8	145.8	2,047.7
Percentage possible sunshine	44	45	48	52	49	42	41	43	47	49	48	48	46
Source: China Meteorological Administration

== Education ==
- Suining Senior High School
- Wenhua Middle School
- Ninghai Middle School
- Jinghua Middle School
- Shuren Middle School
- Liji Middle School

== Transport ==
Xuzhou Guanyin Airport is located in Shuanggou Town.

The Xuzhou–Yancheng high-speed railway serves the county with two stations: Suining, located north of the county seat, and Guanyin Airport (railway), situated in the northwestern extremity of the county adjacent to the airport.
