= Suining railway station (Jiangsu) =

Railway station in Xuzhou, Jiangsu

Suining 睢宁

General information
- Location: Suining County, Xuzhou, Jiangsu; China
- Coordinates: 33°57′16″N 117°55′52″E
- Line: Xuzhou–Yancheng high-speed railway

History
- Opened: 16 December 2019
Location

Suining railway station (Chinese: 睢宁站) is a railway station in Suining County, Xuzhou, Jiangsu, China. It is an intermediate stop on the Xuzhou–Yancheng high-speed railway and was opened with the line on 16 December 2019. It has a station building with a waiting room, two side platforms, and two through lines without platforms.

On 15 April 2022, the station was closed in an attempt to reduce the spread of coronavirus. It was reopened on 5 June.

Preceding station	China Railway High-speed	Following station
Guanyin Airport towards Xuzhou East	Xuzhou–Yancheng high-speed railway	Suqian towards Yancheng
