= Nanyang =

Nanyang is the romanization of two common Chinese place names. It may refer to:

== Written as 南洋; 'Southern Ocean' ==
=== Multiple countries ===
- Nanyang (region), a Chinese term denoting the Southeast Asian lands surrounding the South China Sea

=== China ===
- Nanyang Fleet, Qing dynasty naval fleet based in Shanghai
- Shanghai Jiao Tong University, originally Nanyang Public School
- Nanyang Model High School, or Nanyang Middle School, Shanghai
- Nanyang, Yancheng, a town in Tinghu District, Yancheng, Jiangsu

=== Malaysia ===
- Nanyang Siang Pau, a Chinese language newspaper

=== Singapore ===
- Nanyang, Singapore, a residential precinct
- Nanyang Academy of Fine Arts, part of the University of the Arts Singapore
- Nanyang Girls' High School
- Nanyang Junior College
- Nanyang Polytechnic
- Nanyang Primary School
- Nanyang Technological University
- Hwa Chong Institution, formerly Nanyang Overseas Chinese High School

== Written as 南陽; 南阳; 'Southern Yang', as in "yin and yang" ==
=== Towns in China ===
- Nanyang, Shanghang County, Fujian
- Nanyang, Shouning County, Fujian
- Nanyang, Tanchang County, in Tanchang County, Gansu
- Nanyang, Nanning, in Qingxiu District, Nanning, Guangxi
- Nanyang, Xingshan County, in Xingshan County, Hubei
- Nanyang, Leiyang, in Leiyang City, Hunan
- Nanyang, Dafeng, in Dafeng City, Jiangsu
- Nanyang, Qidong, in Qidong City, Jiangsu
- Nanyang, Fufeng County, in Fufeng County, Shaanxi
- Nanyang, Weishan County, in Weishan County, Shandong
- Nanyang, Hangzhou, in Xiaoshan District, Hangzhou, Zhejiang

=== Other places ===
- Nanyang Basin, basin split between Henan and Hubei provinces
  - Nanyang, Henan, a prefecture-level city
    - Nanyang Commandery, a historical region centered in Nanyang City
- Nanyang Lake, one of the Nansi Lakes in Southwestern Shandong

== Other uses ==
- Pricilla Nanyang, South Sudanese politician
