= Silang tanmu =

Peking opera play

Silang tanmu (Note: Translated into English as Fourth Son Visits His Mother.) (Chinese: 四郎探母; pinyin: Sìláng Tànmǔ) is a Peking opera play inspired by The Generals of the Yang Family. It has been repeatedly banned in China.

== Plot ==
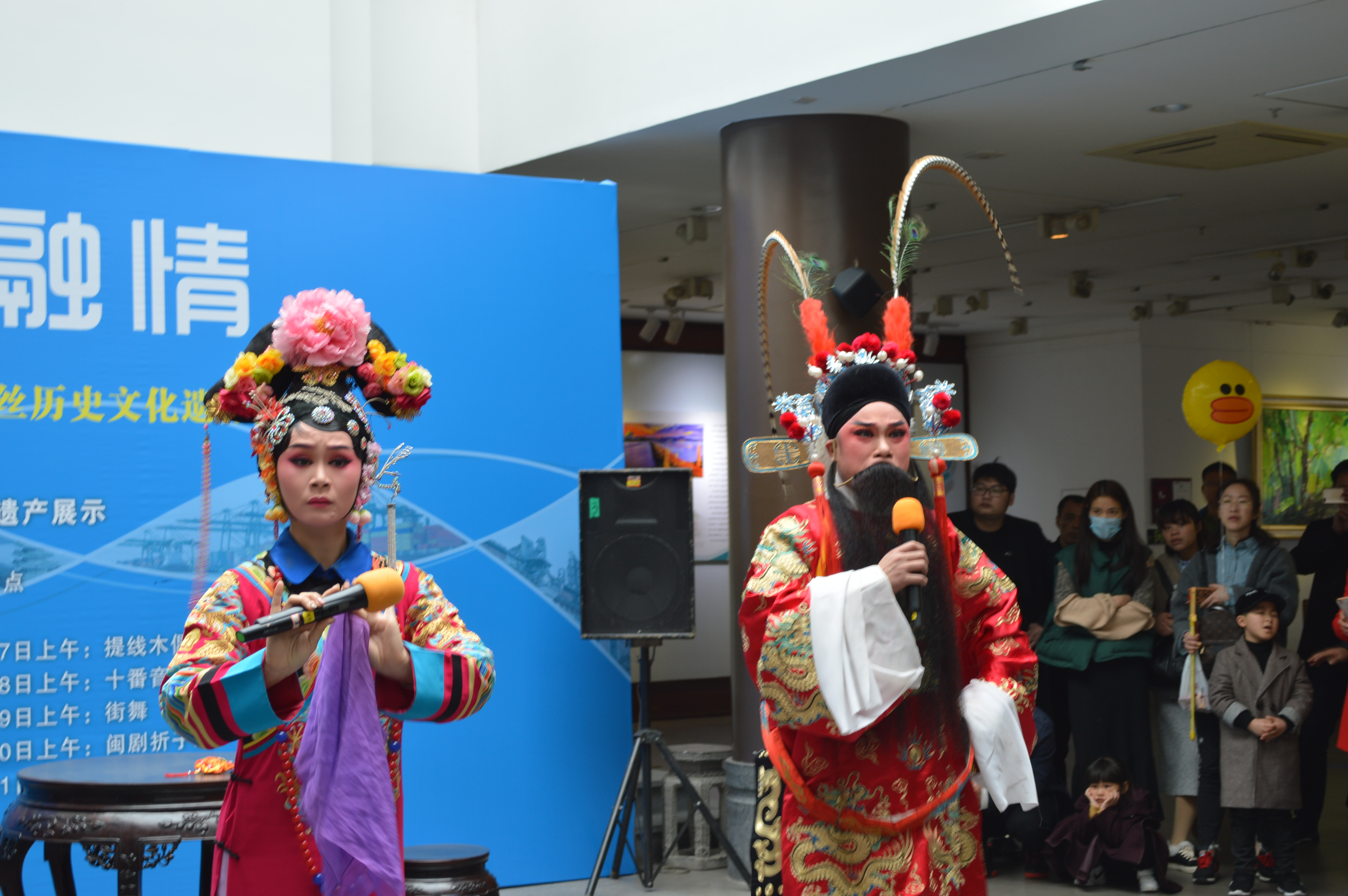
Silang visits his mother, Min opera performance at the Maritime Silk Road Cultural Exhibition Week in Fuqing

Inspired by episodes from the Ming dynasty historical novel The Generals of the Yang Family, the play is set in the Song dynasty under the rule of Emperor Taizong and contains thirteen distinct scenes.

The titular protagonist of the play, Yang Yanhui, also known as Yang Silang (杨四郎), is a Song Chinese general who is captured by Liao troops. He keeps his true identity a secret and marries the daughter of the Liao empress, Princess Iron Mask (铁镜公主, a dan role). The two dynasties come into conflict again fifteen years later; Yang briefly visits his family with his wife's help but eventually returns to enemy territory. He is initially condemned to death by his mother-in-law but is let off with a warning after the princess intercedes on his behalf.

== Sources ==
The earliest guide to Peking opera began to circulate in 1845. It featured various actors and the plays that they were known for performing in; Silang tanmu is listed seven times, more than any other play.

The authorship of the play is unknown. The earliest surviving script dates back to 1880 and is found in the Liyuan jicheng (梨園集成) or Compendium of Plays by Li Shizhong (李世忠). An English translation of Silang tanmu by A. C. Scott, titled Ssu Lang Visits his Mother, was included in the first volume of his Traditional Chinese Plays (1967).

== Performance history ==
Silang tanmu was first staged in the mid-Qing dynasty, albeit in a "provincial" form of Peking opera. Due to its portrayal of a general surrendering to the enemy, the play has been repeatedly banned in China; the Republic of China governmental department in charge of cultural policy in Tianjin, for instance, banned the play in 1945 because it "distorted the normal ethics and morality". It was banned yet again following the Chinese Communist Revolution and the establishment of the People's Republic of China.

The ban was briefly relaxed in 1956, as part of the Hundred Flowers Campaign, although playwrights were nonetheless obliged to amend some of the dialogue. The first post-ban staging of Silang tanmu in May of the same year was watched by approximately two thousand people. The play continued to be performed until 1960, following which it apparently "incurred official disapproval once more". Following the end of the Cultural Revolution after the death of Mao, the play and much of the rest of the traditional Peking opera repertoire began to be performed again. The play is now considered a staple of many Peking opera companies in China today.

== Adaptations ==
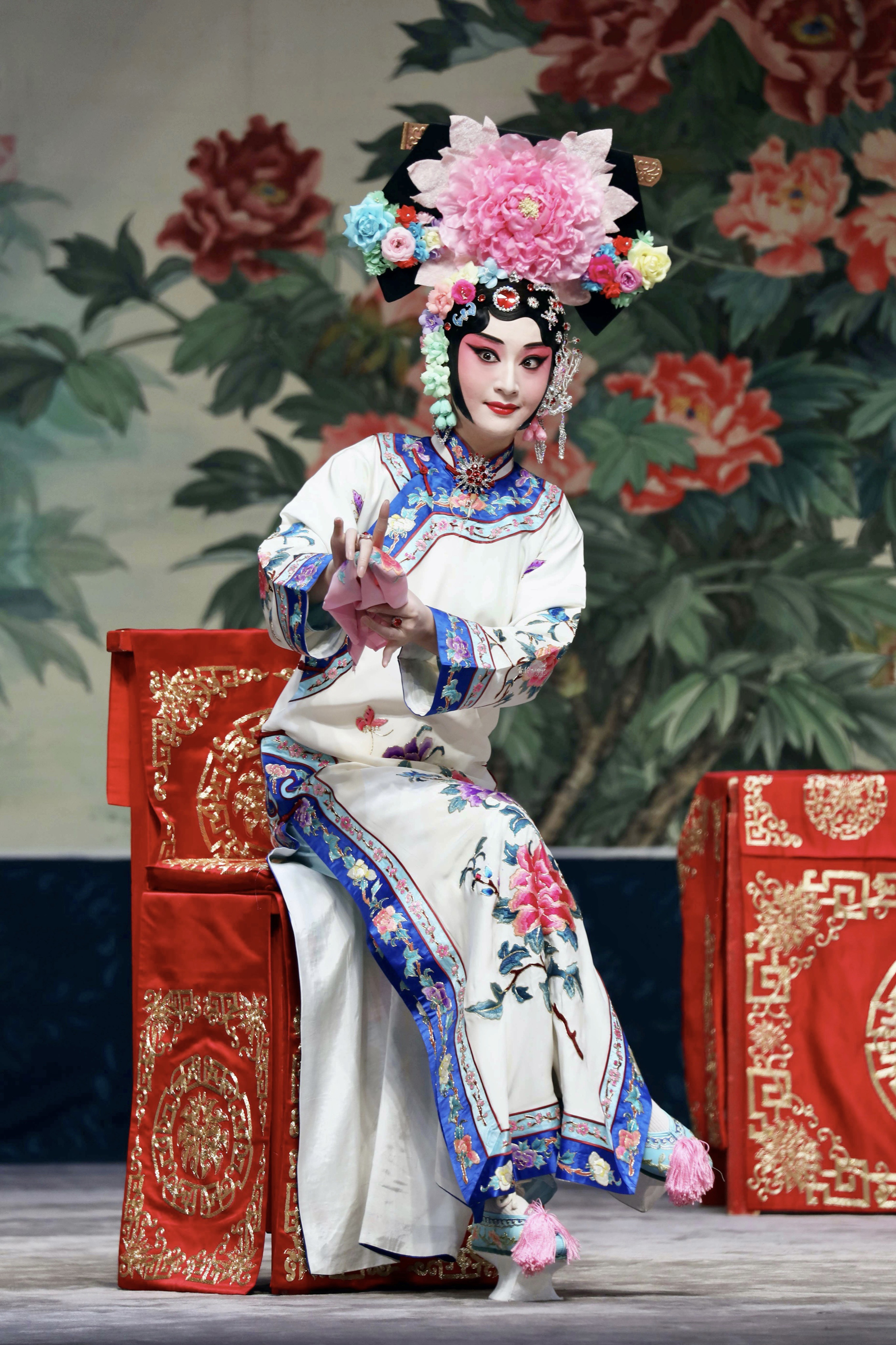
Silang Visits His Mother, Mei Lanfang Grand Theatre, Beijing

The play has been performed in various other forms of Chinese opera, including Hebei opera, Shanxi opera, Shaanxi opera, Min opera, and Sichuan opera.

A Cantonese film adaptation of the play (Jyutping: sei3 long4 taam3 mou5), was released in 1959. It was directed by Wong Hok-sing and stars Ma Sze-tsang, Yu Lai-jan, Lam Ka-sing, Fung Wong-nui, and Poon Yat On. In the film, Yang is coerced into marrying the Liao princess. She is subsequently visited by one of Yang's sisters-in-law, who persuades her to allow Yang to return to his home to visit his ailing mother. A sequel was released in the same year.
