= Guanyin Airport railway station =

Railway station in Xuzhou, China

Guanyin Airport 观音机场站
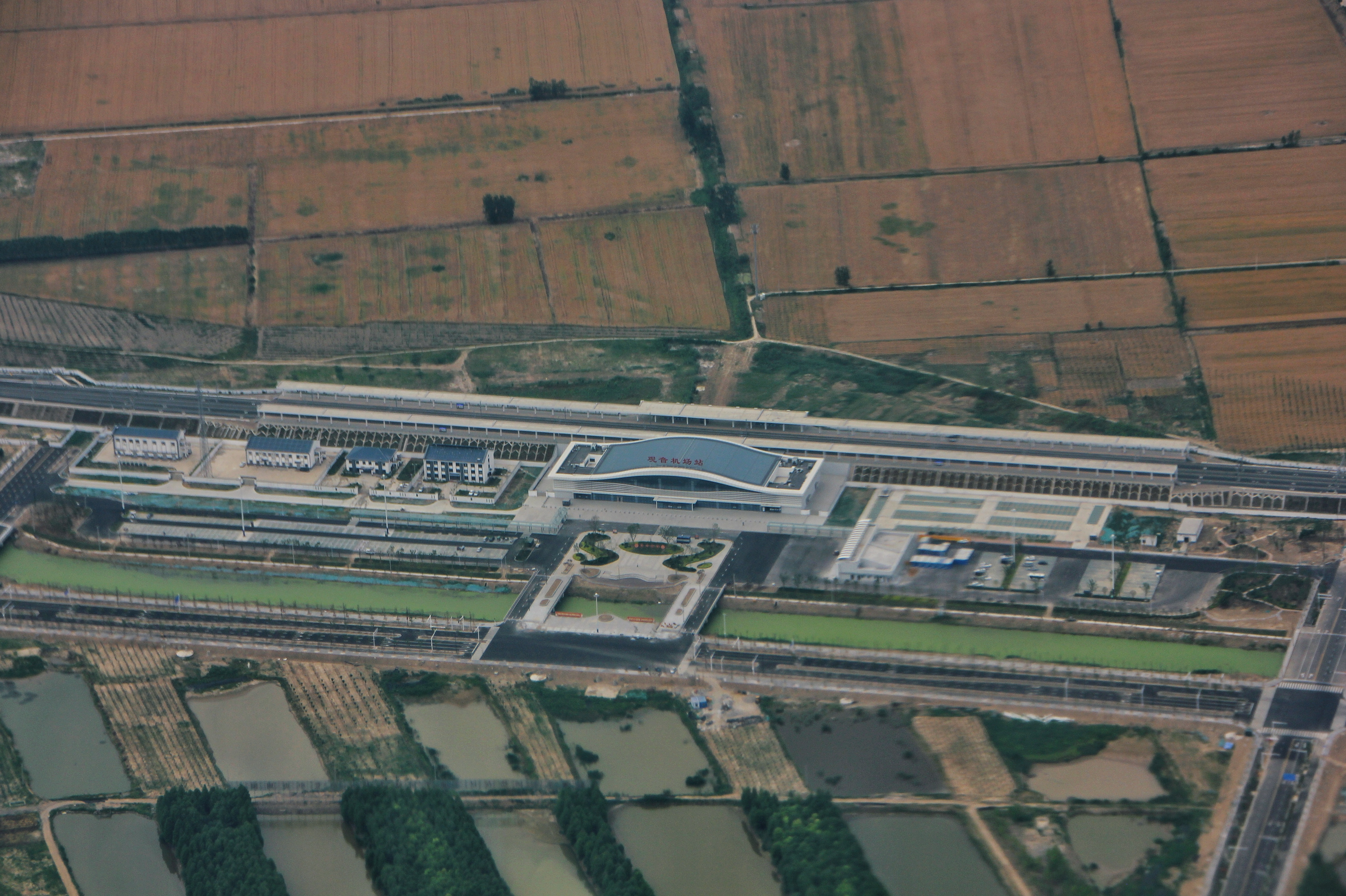
- Overview of the station in 2020

General information
- Location: Suining County, Xuzhou, Jiangsu; China
- Coordinates: 34.0404°N 117.5580°E
- System: High speed rail
- Line: Xuzhou–Yancheng high-speed railway
- Connections: Xuzhou Guanyin Airport

History
- Opened: 16 December 2019
Location

Guanyin Airport railway station is a railway station in Suining County, Xuzhou, Jiangsu, People's Republic of China. It is situated about 1.5 kilometres (0.93 mi) south of Xuzhou Guanyin Airport, and about 32 kilometres (20 mi) from the urban center of Xuzhou city. Passengers may reach the airport via a free shuttle bus.

== History ==
The station was called Shuanggou railway station during construction. On 14 October 2019, it was officially named as Guanyin Airport railway station, and the station opened on 16 December 2019, with its initial service level as twelve trains per day in total.

Preceding station	China Railway High-speed	Following station
Xuzhou East Terminus	Xuzhou–Yancheng high-speed railway	Suining (Jiangsu) towards Yancheng
