= Jiangsu Yancheng Middle School =

School in Yancheng, Jiangsu, China

Jiangsu Yancheng Middle School (江苏省盐城中学) is a secondary school in Yancheng, Jiangsu. It serves grades 7 through 12.

The school is a part of the Yancheng Middle School Education Group.

As of 2017, Zhang Ruiqing is the president of the school.

== History ==
It was established in 1927 and moved into its current campus in Autumn 2005.
