= Xuzhou Guanyin International Airport =

Airport serving Xuzhou, Jiangsu, China

Xuzhou Guanyin International Airport 徐州观音国际机场

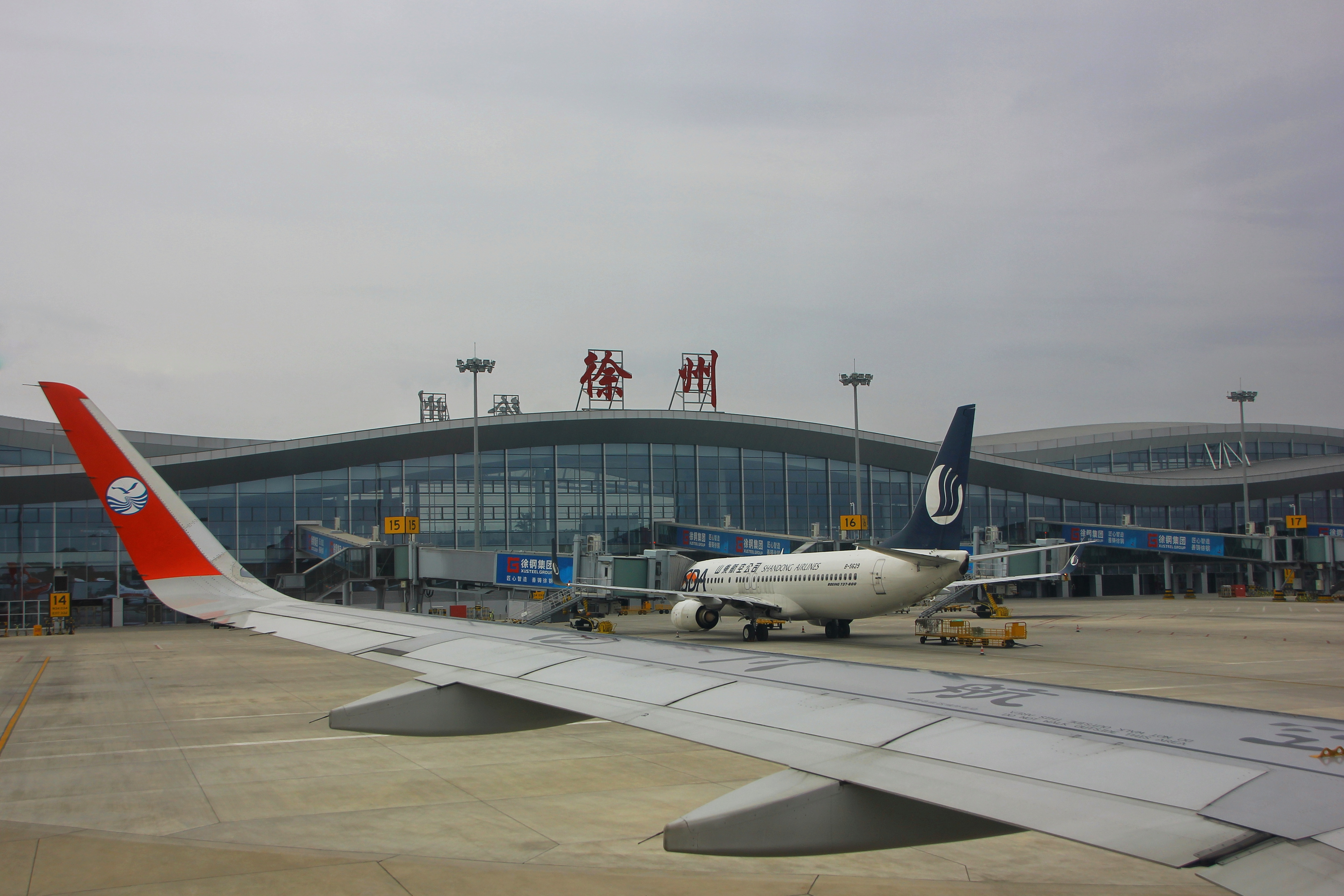
- Terminal (May 2020)
- IATA: XUZ; ICAO: ZSXZ

Summary
- Airport type: Public
- Serves: Xuzhou
- Location: Shuanggou Town, Suining County, Jiangsu, China
- Opened: November 8, 1997; 29 years ago
- Elevation AMSL: 33 m (108 ft)
- Coordinates: 34°03′32.6″N 117°33′19″E
- Website: www.xzairport.com

Map
- Location in Jiangsu XUZ/ZSXZ (China)

Runways
Direction	Length		Surface
Direction	m	ft	Surface
09/27	3,400	11,155	Concrete

Statistics (2025)
- Passengers: 4,082,736
- Aircraft movements: 34,830
- Cargo (metric tons): 18,313.2
- Source:List of the busiest airports in China

Xuzhou Guanyin International Airport
- Simplified Chinese: 徐州观音国际机场
- Traditional Chinese: 徐州觀音國際機場
Transcriptions
Standard Mandarin
- Hanyu Pinyin: Xúzhōu Guānyīn Guójì Jīchǎng
- Wade–Giles: Hsü-chou Kuan-yin Kuo-chi-chi-chʻang

Xuzhou Guanyin International Airport (IATA: XUZ, ICAO: ZSXZ) is an airport serving the city of Xuzhou in East China's Jiangsu province. In 2025, it served 4,082,736 throughout the year, ranking the 54th busiest airport in China. Located about 45 km (28 mi) from the downtown area in the southeast outskirts of the city, the airport has two terminal buildings.

The airport is located about 1.5 km (0.93 mi) north of Guanyin Airport railway station.

== History ==
Before Xuzhou Guanyin Airport was built, Xuzhou's civil aviation services operated out of Xuzhou Daguozhuang Airport (徐州大郭莊機場), which had originally been constructed in the 1930s. On 17 August 1993, the State Council and the Central Military Commission approved the project for Guanyin Airport. Construction began in December 1995, the airport passed inspection on 7 November 1997 and was opened on November 8, 1997.

In December 2007, the airport received approval for temporary opening as a Category‑I port of entry (一類口岸). In June 2009, Phase I expansion and greening works began.

On 26 September 2010, the airport passed national acceptance and was upgraded to a nationally designated port of entry.

In 2011, Phase I expansion and greening works were completed, increasing the airport’s annual passenger capacity from one million to two million. The terminal building was renovated: the exterior canopy was replaced with glass; eleven new domestic VIP lounges were added to the existing one domestic and one international VIP lounge; check‑in counters increased from seven to eleven; security lanes increased from four to seven; and one baggage carousel was added for arrivals. Two new Class‑D aircraft stands were built on the west side of the apron, covering about 15,000 m²; one new boarding bridge was added; and the T2 connector road was widened and upgraded (about 2,500 m²) to meet training requirements for Class‑E aircraft. New international cargo facilities and joint‑inspection infrastructure were constructed, and the airport hotel was renovated.

On 28 March 2011, the direct Xuzhou–Taipei route officially opened, operated by Shanghai Airlines.

On 22 November 2013, Xuzhou Guanyin Airport surpassed one million annual passengers for the first time, becoming the fourth airport in Jiangsu Province—after Nanjing, Wuxi, and Changzhou—and the 58th nationwide to exceed the one‑million‑passenger threshold.

On 30 October 2014, the Jiangsu Provincial Development and Reform Commission approved the feasibility study for Phase II expansion. The project was designed to meet projected 2025 demand of 4.6 million passengers and 50,000 tons of cargo, with a total investment of 1.3 billion yuan. Planned works included: a new 34,000 m² terminal with six boarding bridges; an elevated roadway and expanded apron; a new 3,400‑meter parallel taxiway, one rapid‑exit taxiway, and three perpendicular taxiways; and supporting facilities such as airfield fencing, patrol roads, water supply and drainage, fire‑rescue systems, power supply, and administrative buildings.

On 31 December 2015, with approval from the Civil Aviation Administration of China, Xuzhou Guanyin Airport was officially renamed Xuzhou Guanyin International Airport (徐州观音国际机场).

On 8 June 2018, Terminal 2 of Xuzhou Guanyin International Airport officially entered service. On 18 November 2022, construction officially began on the renovation and expansion of the Terminal 1 building.

The airport consisting of a 20,000-square-metre (220,000 sq ft) terminal building and 3,400-metre (11,200 ft) runway. The construction cost was estimated at $105 million, with most of the cost provided by the Xuzhou municipal government.

=== Terminal 2 ===
The inauguration of Terminal 2 was on June 8, 2018. With 34,000 square meters of space, the new terminal has 8 jet bridges, 20 check-in counters, 10 automated check-in machines, 10 security checkpoints and more than 1,312 seats. With this new facility, the airport can handle another 5 million passengers and 50,000 metric tons of cargo every year. It also adds a natural gas energy system, used to provide refrigeration, heating, and partial power.

Since the opening of Terminal 2, it has been exclusively used for domestic flights, while regional international flights use Terminal 1.

== Airlines and destinations ==
Airlines	Destinations
Air Guilin	Guilin, Guiyang, Haikou, Kunming, Xishuangbanna, Zhangjiajie
China Express Airlines	Chongqing, Dalian, Fuzhou, Quanzhou, Taizhou, Zhoushan, Zhuhai
China Southern Airlines	Guangzhou, Jieyang
Greater Bay Airlines	Hong Kong
GX Airlines	Changsha, Haikou, Nanning
Hainan Airlines	Hohhot, Shenzhen
Jiangxi Air	Nanchang
Loong Air	Changchun, Chengdu–Tianfu, Dalian, Guangzhou, Haikou, Harbin, Kunming, Quanzhou, Shenyang, Shenzhen, Urumqi, Xining, Yinchuan, Zhuhai
Lucky Air	Guiyang, Kunming
Shandong Airlines	Shenyang, Xiamen
Sichuan Airlines	Chengdu–Tianfu, Guiyang, Harbin, Kunming, Shenyang
Tianjin Airlines	Guiyang, Yichang, Yulin (Shaanxi)
Tibet Airlines	Dali, Yibin
West Air	Harbin, Sanya

== See also ==
- List of airports in China
