= Shouning =

Shouning County 寿宁县 Showning
- County
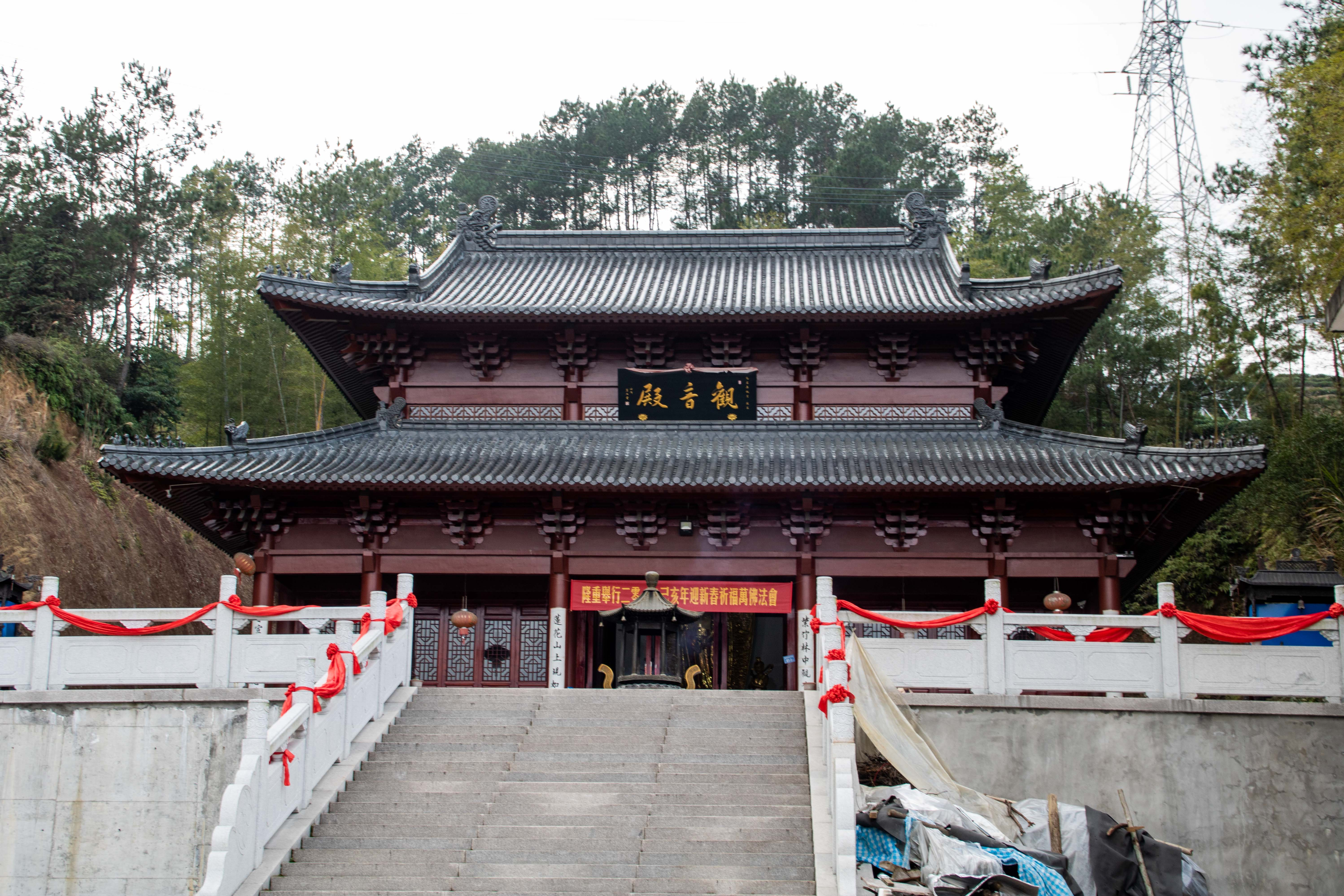
- A temple in Nanyang

- Location of the seat in Fujian
- Coordinates: 27°24′N 119°30′E
- Country: People's Republic of China
- Province: Fujian
- Prefecture-level city: Ningde

Area
  - Total: 1,433 km^{2} (553 sq mi)

Population (2020 census)
  - Total: 177,960
  - Density: 124.2/km^{2} (321.6/sq mi)
- Time zone: UTC+8 (China Standard)

Shouning County (simplified Chinese: 寿宁县; traditional Chinese: 壽寧縣; pinyin: Shòuníng Xiàn; Foochow Romanized: Sêu-nìng-gâing) is a small county located in the northeast of Fujian province of People's Republic of China, bordering Zhejiang province to the northeast. It is under the jurisdiction of Ningde City, An Eastern Min dialect of Min Chinese (similar to the Fuzhou dialect) is spoken there.

There are a number of covered bridges located there, and of the 100 or so woven timber arch "lounge bridges" throughout China, Shouning County has 19. The county hosted the second international conference on Chinese covered bridges from September 20 to 23, 2007.

Beilu opera (also called Luantan), a variety of Min opera, is popular in Shouning County.

The county spans an area of 1,433 square kilometres (553 mi^{2}), and has a population of about 177,960 as of 2020.

== History ==
Shouning County was first established in 1455, under the reign of the Jingtai Emperor of the Ming dynasty.

== Administrative divisions ==
Shouning County comprises eight towns and six townships. These are then divided into 205 administrative villages.

=== Towns ===
The county's eight towns are Aoyang, Xietan, Nanyang, Wuqu, Xixi, Pingxi, Fengyang, and Qingyuan.

=== Townships ===
The county's six townships are Da'an Township, Kengdi Township, Zhuguanlong Township, Qinyang Township, Tuoxi Township, and Xiadang Township.

== Climate ==
Climate data for Shouning, elevation 845 m (2,772 ft), (1991–2020 normals, extremes 1981–2010)
| Month | Jan | Feb | Mar | Apr | May | Jun | Jul | Aug | Sep | Oct | Nov | Dec | Year |
|---|---|---|---|---|---|---|---|---|---|---|---|---|---|
| Record high °C (°F) | 23.2 (73.8) | 26.8 (80.2) | 29.0 (84.2) | 31.1 (88.0) | 33.7 (92.7) | 34.4 (93.9) | 36.7 (98.1) | 35.4 (95.7) | 34.5 (94.1) | 31.4 (88.5) | 30.4 (86.7) | 23.8 (74.8) | 36.7 (98.1) |
| Mean daily maximum °C (°F) | 10.7 (51.3) | 12.3 (54.1) | 15.4 (59.7) | 20.3 (68.5) | 23.8 (74.8) | 26.5 (79.7) | 29.7 (85.5) | 29.0 (84.2) | 25.9 (78.6) | 21.7 (71.1) | 17.4 (63.3) | 12.9 (55.2) | 20.5 (68.8) |
| Daily mean °C (°F) | 5.7 (42.3) | 7.1 (44.8) | 10.2 (50.4) | 15.0 (59.0) | 19.0 (66.2) | 22.2 (72.0) | 24.6 (76.3) | 24.1 (75.4) | 21.3 (70.3) | 16.7 (62.1) | 12.3 (54.1) | 7.4 (45.3) | 15.5 (59.9) |
| Mean daily minimum °C (°F) | 2.4 (36.3) | 3.6 (38.5) | 6.5 (43.7) | 11.0 (51.8) | 15.2 (59.4) | 19.0 (66.2) | 21.0 (69.8) | 20.8 (69.4) | 18.1 (64.6) | 13.1 (55.6) | 8.7 (47.7) | 3.7 (38.7) | 11.9 (53.5) |
| Record low °C (°F) | −8.7 (16.3) | −7 (19) | −5.8 (21.6) | −0.5 (31.1) | 4.6 (40.3) | 8.9 (48.0) | 15.9 (60.6) | 15.3 (59.5) | 9.6 (49.3) | 1.4 (34.5) | −2.8 (27.0) | −9.8 (14.4) | −9.8 (14.4) |
| Average precipitation mm (inches) | 73.5 (2.89) | 100.1 (3.94) | 187.7 (7.39) | 179.3 (7.06) | 238.6 (9.39) | 320.1 (12.60) | 226.4 (8.91) | 304.1 (11.97) | 175.0 (6.89) | 69.8 (2.75) | 73.3 (2.89) | 64.7 (2.55) | 2,012.6 (79.23) |
| Average precipitation days (≥ 0.1 mm) | 15.2 | 15.7 | 19.2 | 18.4 | 19.9 | 20.5 | 17.3 | 20.9 | 15.9 | 9.8 | 11.4 | 11.6 | 195.8 |
| Average snowy days | 2.5 | 2.3 | 0.7 | 0.1 | 0 | 0 | 0 | 0 | 0 | 0 | 0 | 0.7 | 6.3 |
| Average relative humidity (%) | 82 | 83 | 83 | 81 | 82 | 85 | 81 | 83 | 82 | 79 | 81 | 79 | 82 |
| Mean monthly sunshine hours | 107.7 | 99.4 | 106.8 | 125.0 | 127.6 | 122.1 | 202.4 | 176.9 | 144.1 | 155.9 | 123.3 | 130.8 | 1,622 |
| Percentage possible sunshine | 33 | 31 | 29 | 32 | 30 | 29 | 48 | 44 | 39 | 44 | 38 | 41 | 37 |
Source: China Meteorological Administration

== Economy ==
As of 2019, Shouning County's gross domestic product totaled ¥10.06 billion, a 7.7% increase from 2018. Of this, animal husbandry and aquaculture comprised ¥2.82 billion, up 4.2% from 2018. The county's retail sales in 2019 totaled ¥3.28 billion, up 11.5% from 2018. As of 2019, the county's urban residents experienced a per capita disposable income of ¥28,023, a 9.1% increase from 2018; the county's rural residents had a per capita disposable income of ¥15,359, up 10.2% from 2018.

== Notable people ==
Feng Menglong, a famous Chinese writer, once served as the county magistrate of Shouning County.

== In popular culture ==
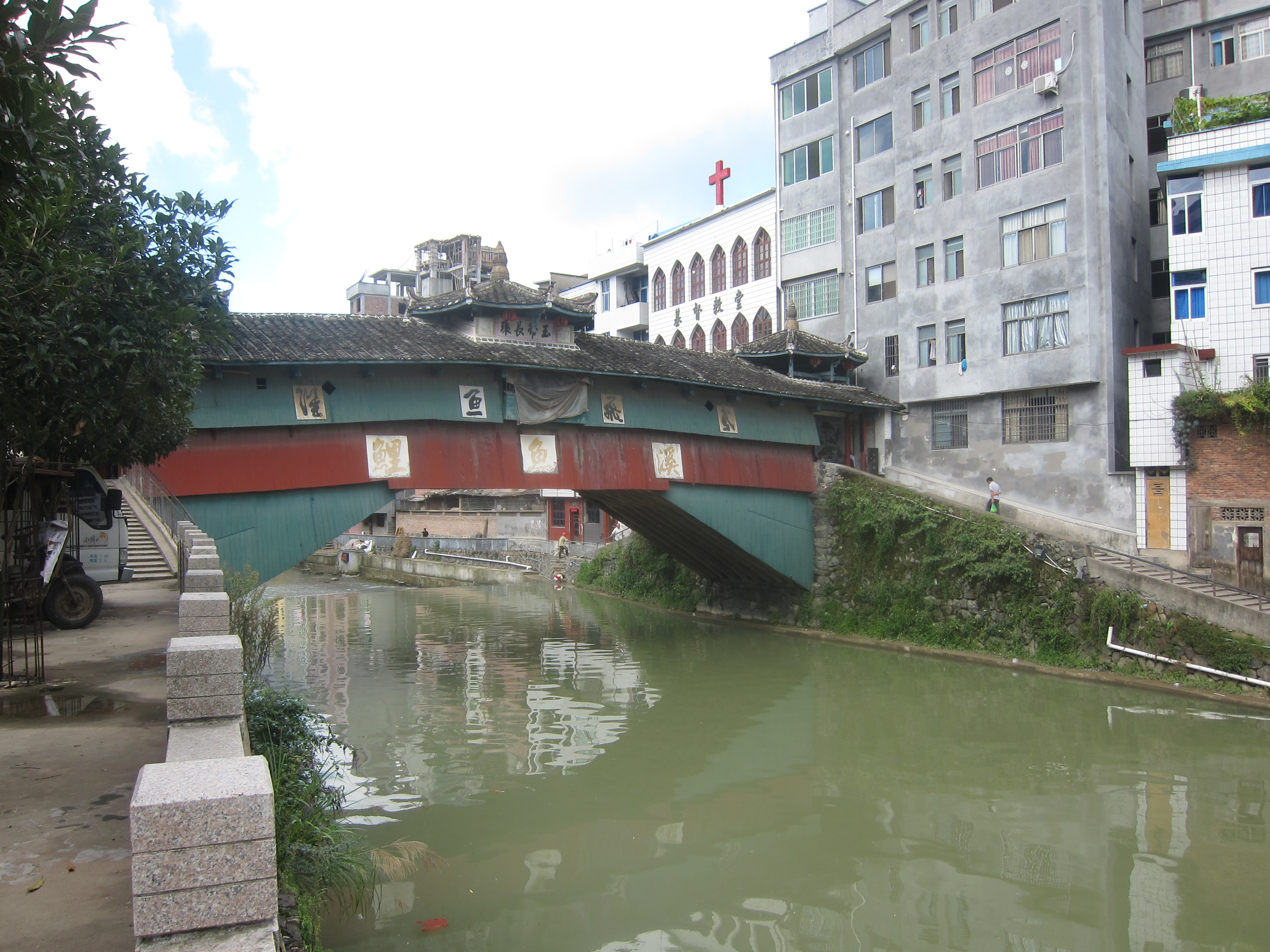
Covered Bridge in county seat

The film "Love on the Covered Bridge" (Chinese: 爱在廊桥) was shot in Shouning County.
