= Summit for Democracy =

Virtual summit hosted by the United States

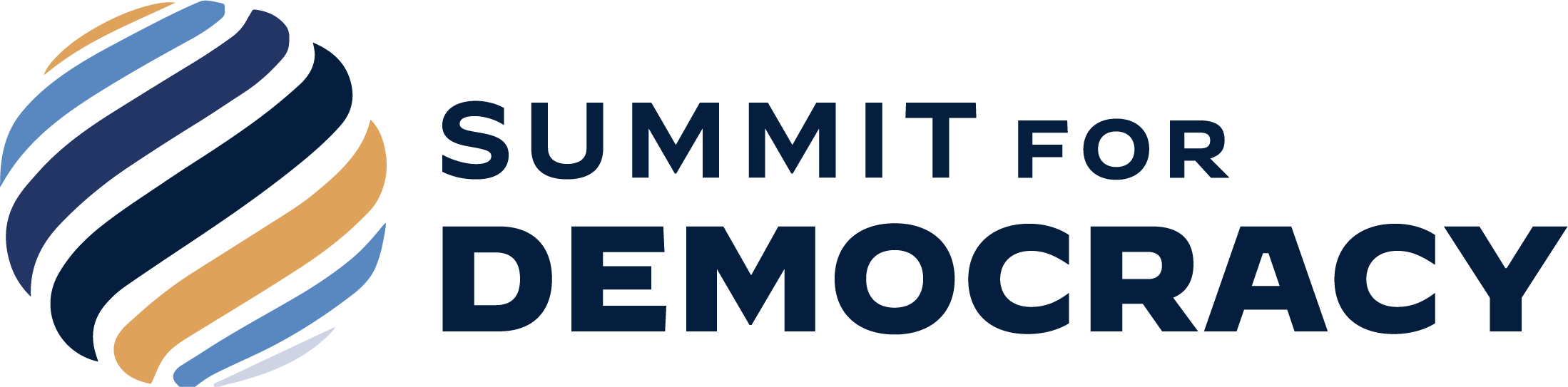

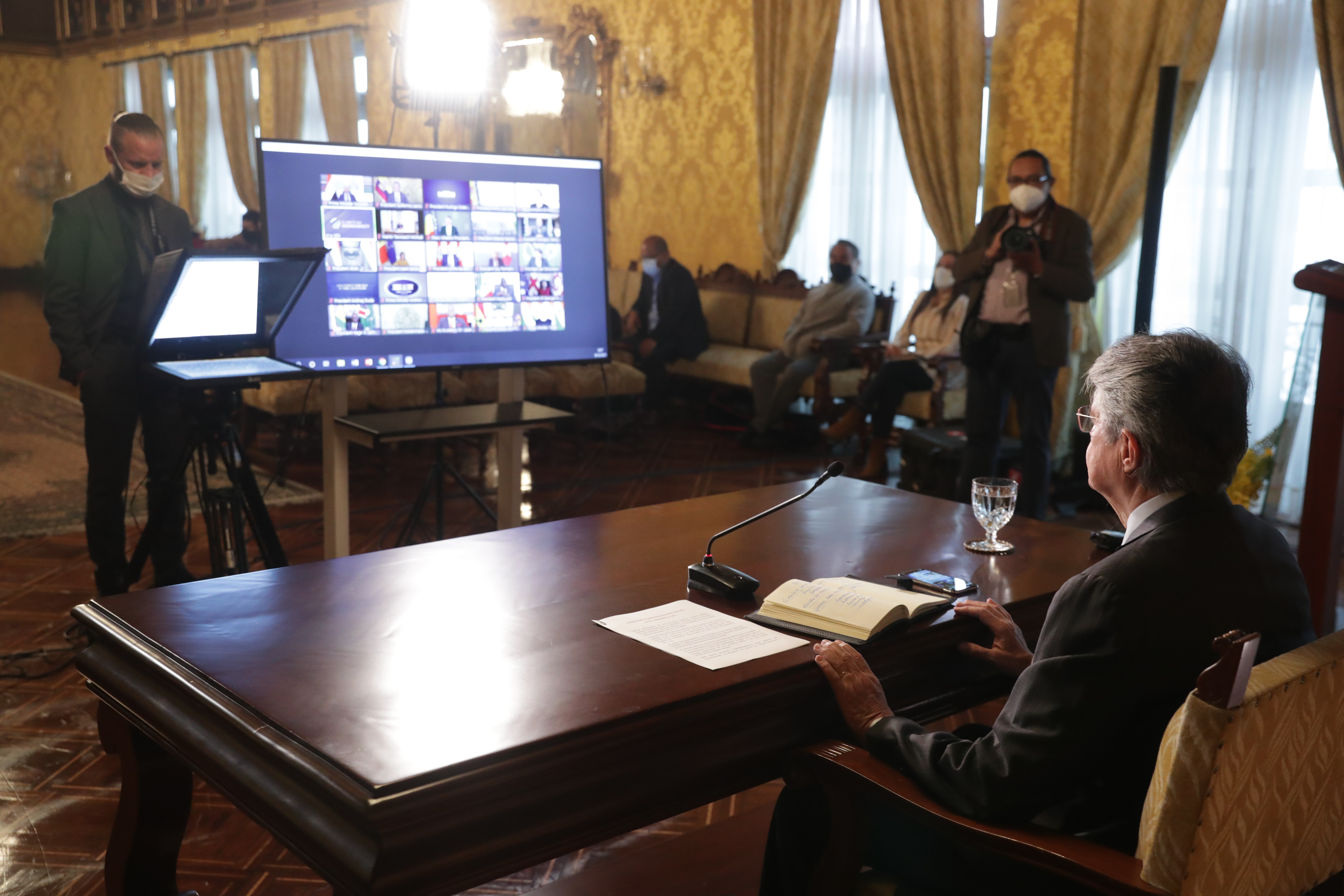
- Guillermo Lasso, the President of Ecuador, participating in the summit
- Host country: United States
- Dates: December 9–10, 2021
- Venues: Virtual
- Participants: 111
- Website: www.state.gov/summit-for-democracy/

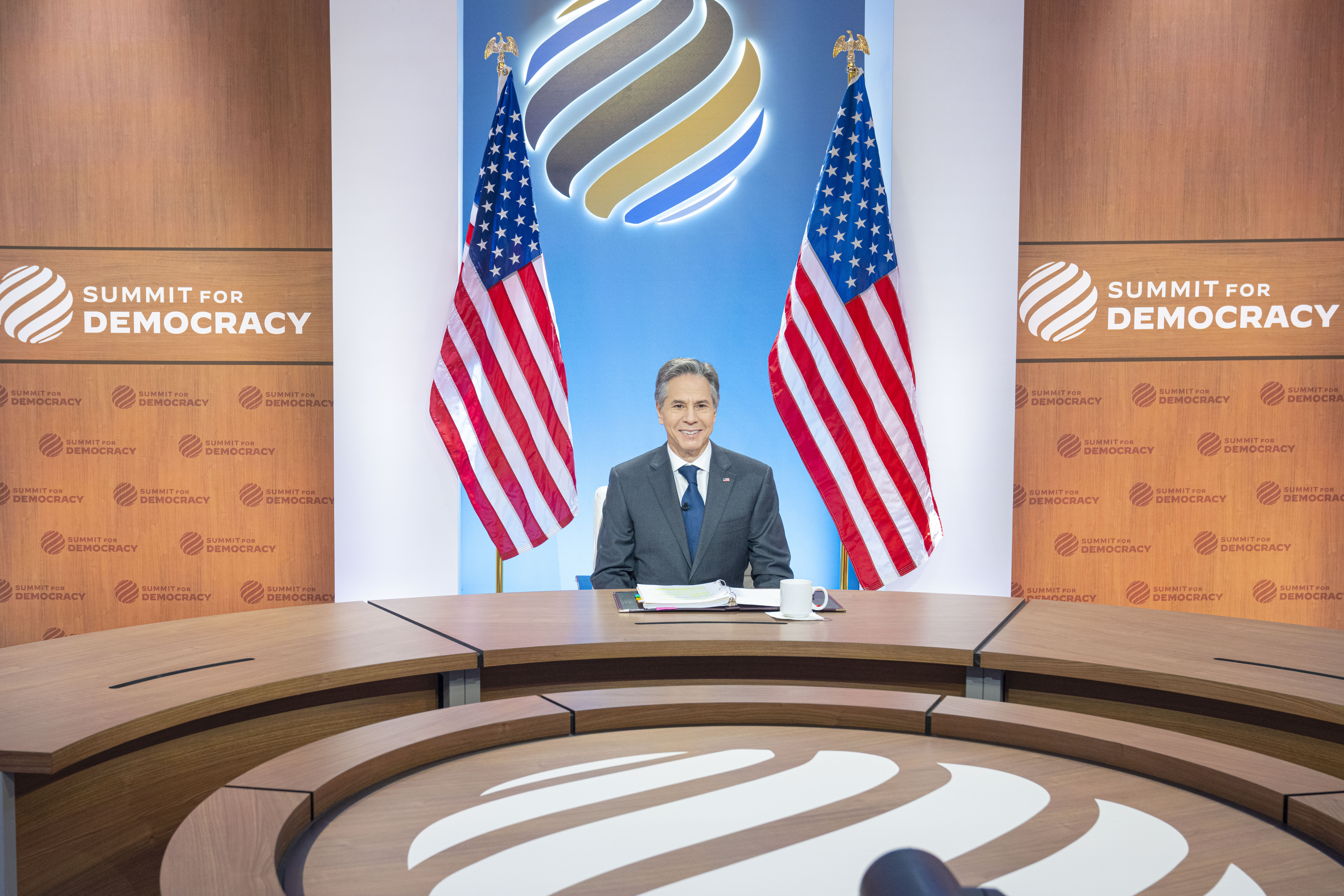
US Secretary of State Antony Blinken

The Summit for Democracy was a virtual summit hosted by the United States during the presidency of Joe Biden "to renew democracy at home and confront autocracies abroad". The first summit was held on December 9–10, 2021. The three themes are defending against authoritarianism, addressing and fighting corruption, and advancing respect for human rights. Contradictory to its themes, multiple un-democratic and authoritarian nations have attended, which has attracted criticism.

The second Summit was held in March 2023 and was co-hosted by United States, Costa Rica, Zambia, Netherlands and Korea.

The third Summit was held in March 2024 hosted in-person and virtually by Republic of Korea.

== Event chronology ==
=== 1st summit in 2021 ===
The schedule was as follows:

==== Day 1 ====
With opening remarks from United States President Joe Biden, the New Zealand Prime Minister Jacinda Ardern made remarks about bolstering democratic resilience in the age of COVID-19 followed by panel discussions. Next topic was about preventing corruption since the conference coincided with the two-day International Anti-Corruption Day and Human Rights Day.

==== Day 2 ====
Discussions about protecting human rights considered the issue of empowering human rights defenders and independent media. During the intersession remarks, Hong Kong democracy activist Nathan Law made a speech. (Note: Hong Kong's democracy index in 2020 was 5.47.) Discussions about strengthening democratic institutions and preventive measures to stop authoritarianism from happening were held. Threats to democracy in the digital age were also discussed regarding digital surveillance. The day ended with closing remarks from Biden.

=== 2nd summit in 2023 ===
The summit was held in hybrid fashion March 28-30 online and across the capitals of the United States, Costa Rica, Zambia, Netherlands and the Republic of Korea.

=== 3rd summit in 2024 ===
The summit was held in hybrid fashion March 18–20. The first two-day sessions were held in Seoul, the capital of South Korea. The last day of the summit was held virtually. South Korean President Yoon Suk Yeol served as the Chair of the Summit.

== List of invited participants ==
=== 1st summit in 2021 ===
Summit for Democracy invited participants Dependent and autonomous territories of invited participants

The United States invited itself and the following countries and territories to virtually attend the summit. Leaders could give a short virtual opening remarks to the participants, for example British Prime Minister gave a three-minute speech.

== Criticism ==
The summit's guestlist was criticized for inviting participants based on the political interests of the United States, not on its democracy ratings. University of Sydney politics professor John Keane said the guestlist was a "cynically drawn up, bureaucratically crafted, agency-structured invitation list that includes states that by any measure are falling way down the democracy rankings or aren't democracies at all".

Philippine President Rodrigo Duterte, accused of crimes against humanity, accepted President Biden's invitation to join the Summit for Democracy. According to ICHRP Chairperson Peter Murphy, "Duterte's reign of terror and mass murder, which have provoked an ICC investigation of crimes against humanity, would seem to disqualify him from providing advice on anything except fascist populism, repression and human rights violations."

Despite several democracy watchdogs calling Brazil a backsliding democracy, Indonesia and Nigeria as other types of democracy, and Pakistan as a banana republic, former Brazilian President Jair Bolsonaro, Indonesian President Joko Widodo, and Nigerian President Muhammadu Buhari participated in the Summit for Democracy, while former Pakistani Prime Minister Imran Khan, though invited, did not. Japanese Prime Minister Fumio Kishida, Canadian Prime Minister Justin Trudeau and former Australian Prime Minister Scott Morrison also participated in the summit.

Some invited countries, such as Angola, the Democratic Republic of the Congo and Iraq, were deemed "not free" in the democracy watchdog Freedom House's latest "Freedom in the World" report. Other invited countries, such as Pakistan, Indonesia, Nigeria, India and Senegal, were deemed "partly free" in the report while Brazil, the United States, Korea, Japan, Canada, Australia and Costa Rica were deemed "free". The report also showed the United States, Korea, Japan, Canada and Australia to be developed democracies and Brazil to be a developing democracy.

== See also ==
- CPC and World Political Parties Summit
