= Min opera =

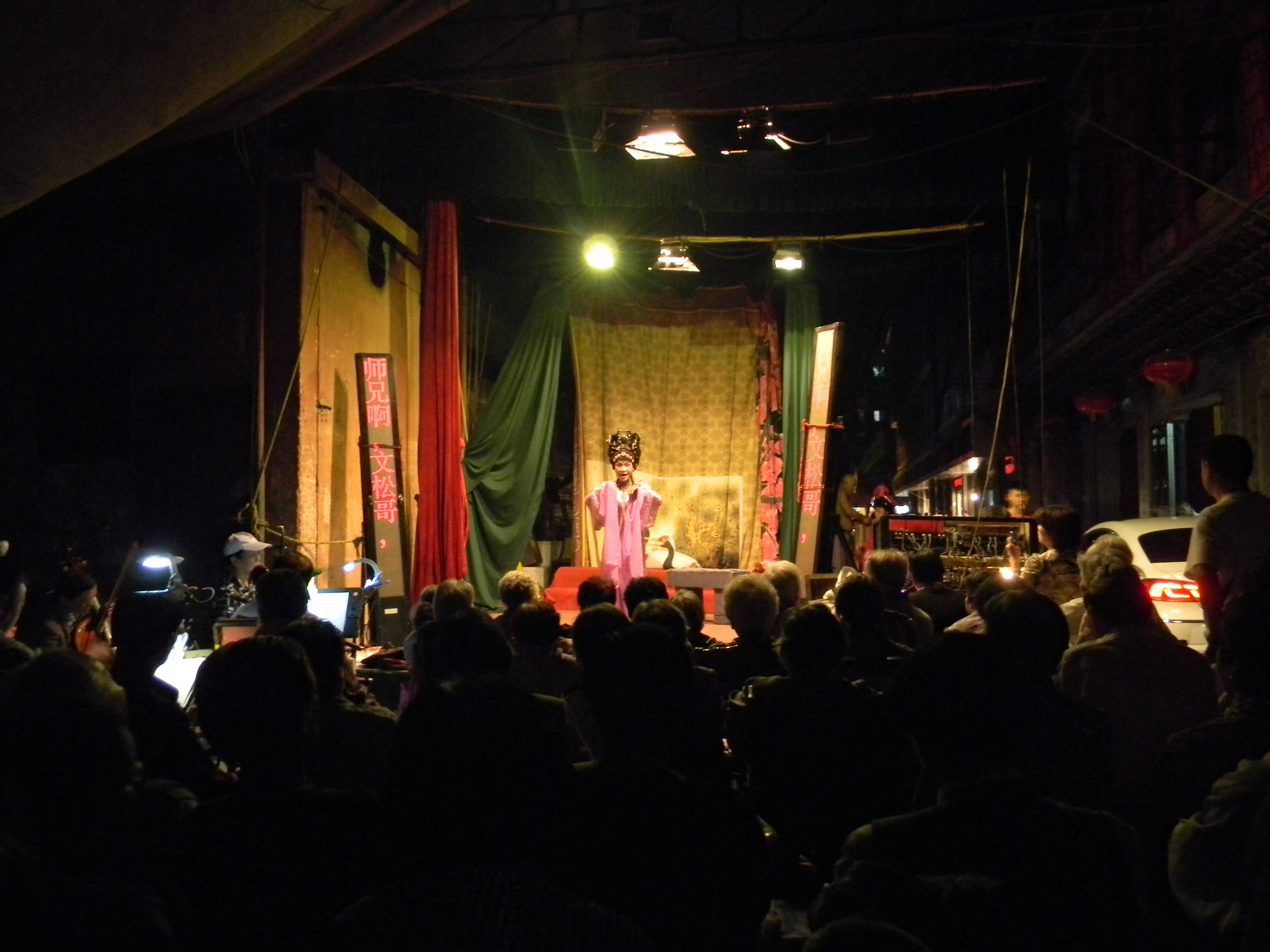
Min opera

Min opera (simplified Chinese: 闽剧; traditional Chinese: 閩劇; pinyin: Mǐnjù; Foochow Romanized: Mìng-kiŏk), also called Fuzhou drama (Chinese: 福州戲; pinyin: Fúzhōuxì; Pe̍h-ōe-jī: Hok-chiu-hì; Foochow Romanized: Hók-ciŭ-hié) or Fuzhou opera, is one of the major forms of traditional opera in Fujian Province. It enjoys great popularity in Fuzhou and surrounding regions in Fujian where the Fuzhou dialect is spoken, as well as in Taiwan and Indonesia, Malaysia, Singapore and Brunei. Min opera had been evolving for over 400 years before expanding greatly in the early twentieth century.

A variety of Min opera called Beilu opera (also called Luantan), is popular in the Eastern Min region of Shouning County, near Zhejiang.
