= Yancheng–Nantong high-speed railway =

High-speed rail line in China

Yancheng–Nantong high-speed railway 盐通高铁

Overview
- Locale: Yancheng; Nantong
- Termini: Yancheng; Nantong West

Service
- Operator: China Railway Shanghai Group

History
- Opened: 30 December 2020

Technical
- Line length: 156.6 km (97 mi)
- Track gauge: 1,435 mm (4 ft 8 1/2 in)
- Operating speed: 350 km/h (217 mph)

The Yancheng–Nantong high-speed railway or Yantong high-speed railway is a high-speed line between Yancheng and Nantong in China. It has a length of 156.6 kilometres (97.3 mi) and a design speed of 350 kilometres per hour (220 mph).The line opened on 30 December 2020. The initial operating speed is 300 kilometres per hour (190 mph).

== History ==
Construction began on 1 May 2018.

== Stations ==
Station Name	Chinese	Location	
Yancheng	盐城	Yancheng	Jiangsu
Yancheng Dafeng	盐城大丰	Yancheng	Jiangsu
Dongtai	东台	Yancheng	Jiangsu
Hai'an	海安	Nantong	Jiangsu
Rugao South	如皋南	Nantong	Jiangsu
Nantong West	南通西	Nantong	Jiangsu
