= Xuzhou–Yancheng high-speed railway =

High speed rail line in China

Xuzhou–Yancheng high-speed railway 徐盐客运专线
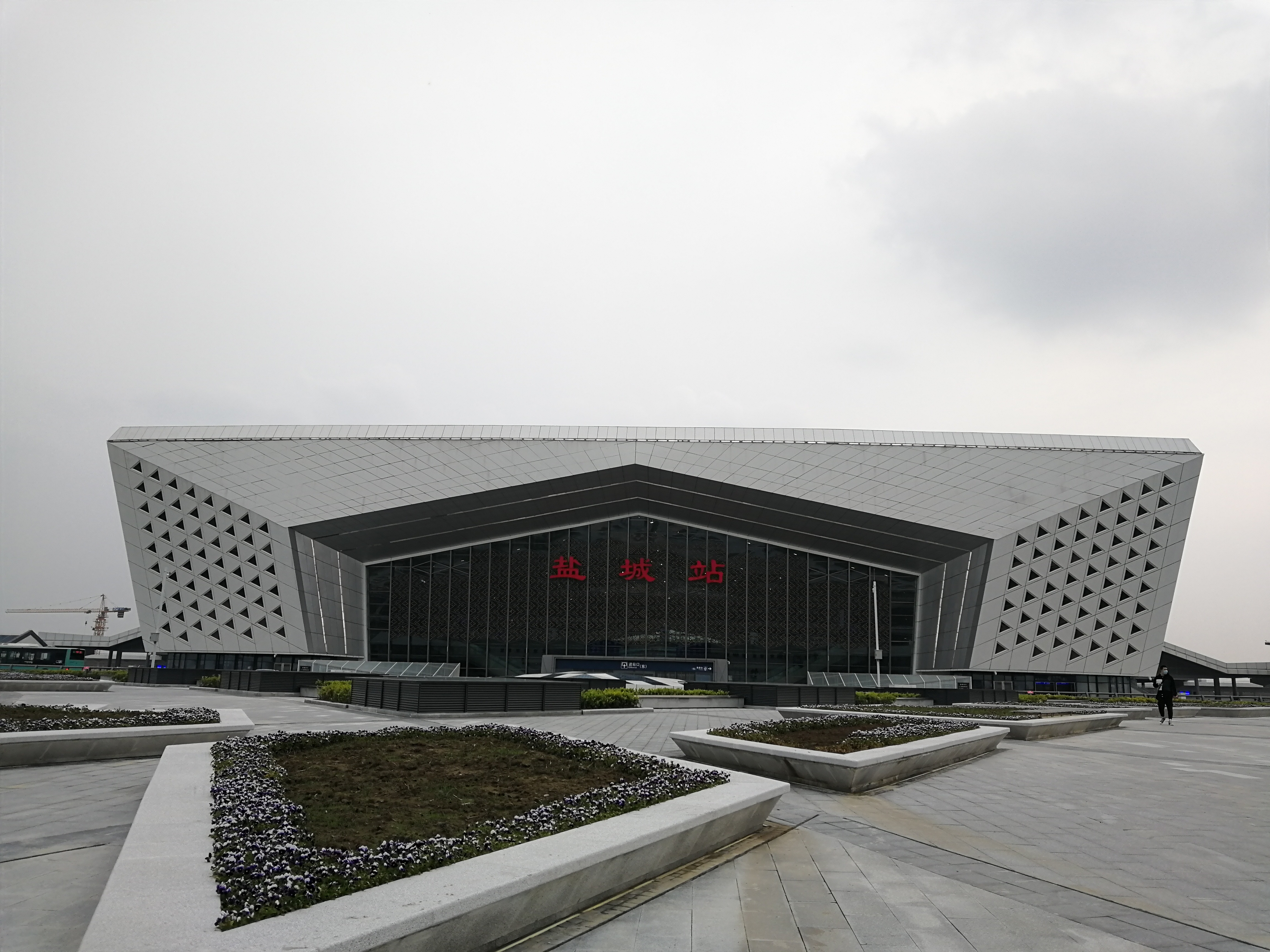
- Yancheng railway station, the southern terminus of the line

Overview
- Status: Operating
- Termini: Xuzhou East; Yancheng
- Stations: 12

Service
- Operator(s): China Railway High-speed

History
- Opened: 16 December 2019

Technical
- Line length: 313 km (194 mi)
- Track gauge: 1,435 mm (4 ft 8 1/2 in)
- Operating speed: 250 km/h (155 mph)

The Xuzhou–Yancheng high-speed railway is a high-speed railway in China. It has a design speed of 250 kilometres per hour (160 mph).

== History ==
In November 2014, construction was expected to take 4.5 years. The line opened on 16 December 2019.

== Route ==
From Xuzhou East, the line heads southeast and serves Guanyin Airport, Suining, and Suqian. The line subsequently meets the Suzhou–Huai'an railway and follows its route, but the two lines don't intersect. Passengers can change between them at Siyang. The line then heads south to Huai'an East, where it joins the Lianyungang–Zhenjiang high-speed railway. After leaving Huai'an, the line heads east to serve Funing South and Jianhu. At Jianhu, passengers can change to the Xinyi–Yancheng railway. Finally, the line terminates at Yancheng. High-speed services continue south on the Yancheng–Nantong high-speed railway.

The Siyang–Huai'an section will form part of the Beijing−Shanghai high-speed railway Second Channel.

== Stations ==
Station Name	Chinese	China Railway transfers/connections	Metro transfers/connections
Xuzhou East	徐州东	Beijing–Shanghai high-speed railway Zhengzhou–Xuzhou high-speed railway	1 Xuzhou Metro Line 1
Guanyin Airport	观音机场		
Suining	睢宁		
Suqian	宿迁		
Siyang	泗阳		
Huai'an East	淮安东	Lianyungang–Zhenjiang high-speed railway	
Funing South	阜宁南		
Jianhu	建湖		
Yancheng	盐城	Qingdao–Yancheng railway Xinyi–Changxing railway Yancheng–Nantong high-speed railway	
