= Nanyang, Shouning County =

Town in Fujian, China

Coordinates: 27.3899°N 119.5922°E

Nanyang (南阳镇) is a Township-level division within Shouning County, in the municipal region of Ningde City, in Fujian Province of eastern China.

== Geography ==
Nanyang borders the county-level city of Fu'an to the southeast.

On all other sides it is bordered by towns and townships forming part of Shouning County:

- Xixi (犀溪乡) to the east;
- Da'an (大安乡) to the north;
- Qinyang (芹洋乡) to the northwest;
- Qingyuan (清源乡) to the west;
- Xietan (斜滩镇) to the southwest;
- Zhuguanlong (竹管垅乡) to the south.
