= CPC and World Political Parties Summit =

International conference of political parties

CPC and World Political Parties Summit 中国共产党与世界政党领导人峰会
- Host country: China
- Date: 6 July 2021 (video conference)
- Motto: For the People's Wellbeing: The Responsibility of Political Parties
- Cities: Various
- Participants: Various (see below)
- Chair: Xi Jinping (CCP general secretary)
- Website: cpc100summit.org

The CPC and World Political Parties Summit was an international relations video conference between various international political parties, including both governing and non-governing parties, held on 6 July 2021, shortly after the 100th Anniversary of the Chinese Communist Party. It was chaired by Xi Jinping, general secretary of the Chinese Communist Party (CPC). The summit involved representatives from 500 political parties across 160 countries and over 10,000 party representatives. The theme of the summit was "For the People's Wellbeing: The Responsibility of Political Parties".

== Background ==
The Summit was organized by the International Department of the Chinese Communist Party. The department, which is tasked with building relationships with political parties internationally, has had its profile increase during the Xi era. In 2014, the department launched a series of annual dialogues in an effort to promote "China's story" to foreign elites. The department has also held a series of themed dialogues with foreign political parties, such as a dialogue organized around the 200th birthday of Karl Marx, and an African dialogue in 2018. The latter brought together leaders of political parties from over forty African countries.

The department developed the CPC and the World Political Parties Summit as a formal follow-up to these efforts.

== Proceedings ==
The summit followed days after the 100th Anniversary of the Chinese Communist Party. International Department Vice Minister Guo Yezhou stated that the Summit's purpose was to "help the international community adjust more quickly to the rise of China," and for the Chinese government to increase its "understanding, support, and companionship" from other nations.

More than twenty heads of state from developing countries made speeches congratulating the party on its one-hundredth anniversary, some of them thanking China for the masks and vaccines provided for COVID-19 response efforts.

Xi Jinping was the keynote speaker. He called on political parties worldwide to shoulder historic responsibility for the pursuit of the people's wellbeing and progress of mankind. He also renewed a call to work towards building a community with a shared future for mankind, and voiced rejection towards technology blockades, developmental decoupling, as well as unilateralism, hegemony, and power politics. Some outside analysts interpreted the summit as an attempt to build a bloc opposed to liberal democracies. Xi stated that China's modernization demonstrated that the Chinese model was a viable alternative to Western modes of development and that China was willing to share its experience with other countries.

== Participating political parties ==
The following is an incomplete list of major attendees:

Country	Political party	Leader	National Leader?
China	Communist Party of China	Xi Jinping (host)	✓ (Paramount leader & President)
South Africa	African National Congress	Cyril Ramaphosa	✓ (President)
Kazakhstan	Nur Otan	Nursultan Nazarbayev	(Former President)
Russia	United Russia	Dmitry Medvedev	(Former President & Prime Minister)
Argentina	Justicialist Party	Alberto Fernández	✓ (President)
Vietnam	Communist Party of Vietnam	Nguyễn Phú Trọng	✓ (de facto leader & former president)
Cuba	Communist Party of Cuba	Miguel Díaz-Canel	✓ (de facto leader & President)
Zimbabwe	ZANU-PF	Emmerson Mnangagwa	✓ (President)
Palestine	Fatah	Mahmoud Abbas	✓ (President)
Serbia	Serbian Progressive Party	Aleksandar Vučić	✓ (President)
Pakistan	Pakistan Tehreek-e-Insaf	Imran Khan	✓ (Prime Minister)
Philippines	PDP–Laban	Rodrigo Duterte	✓ (President)
Cambodia	Cambodian People's Party	Hun Sen	✓ (Prime Minister)
Mozambique	FRELIMO	Filipe Nyusi	✓ (President)
Namibia	SWAPO	Hage Geingob	✓ (President)
Republic of the Congo	Congolese Party of Labour	Denis Sassou Nguesso	✓ (President)
Sri Lanka	Sri Lanka Podujana Peramuna	Mahinda Rajapaksa	✓ (Prime Minister)
Bolivia	Movement for Socialism	Evo Morales	(Former President)
Morocco	Justice and Development Party	Saadeddine El Othmani	✓ (Prime Minister)
South Sudan	Sudan People's Liberation Movement	Salva Kiir	✓ (President)
Spain	Communist Party of Spain	José Luis Centella	✗ (Former party leader)
Jordan	Communist Party of Jordan	Faraj Itmeiza	✗ (Party secretary general)
Brazil	Democratic Labour Party	Carlos Lupi	✗ (Party Secretary General)
Moldova	Party of Socialists of the Republic of Moldova	Igor Dodon	(Former president)
Singapore	People's Action Party		
Malaysia	Malaysian Chinese Association	Wee Ka Siong	✗ (Minister of Transport)
Malaysia	Sarawak United Peoples' Party	Sim Kui Hian	✗ (Deputy Premier of Sarawak)
Vanuatu	Vanua'aku Party		
Vanuatu	Union of Moderate Parties		
Vanuatu	National United Party		
Vanuatu	Vanuatu Cultural Self-Reliance Movement		
Vanuatu	Nagriamel		
India	Communist Party of India (Marxist)	Sitaram Yechury	
India	Communist Party of India	Doraisamy Raja	
India	All India Forward Bloc		
Bangladesh	Bangladesh Awami League	Sheikh Hasina	✓ (Prime Minister)
Bangladesh	Bangladesh Nationalist Party	Khaleda Zia	✗ (Former prime minister)
Bangladesh	Jatiya Party	Ziauddin Ahmed Bablu	
Bangladesh	Communist Party of Bangladesh	Mujahidul Islam Selim	
Bangladesh	Jatiya Samajtantrik Dal	Hasanul Haq Inu	
Bangladesh	Samyabadi Dal	Dilip Barua	
Bangladesh	Workers Party of Bangladesh	Rashed Khan Menon	
Mali	Rally for Mali	Bocary Treta	

George Papandreou, president of the Socialist International, was also in attendance. S. Senthilkumar, member of the Lok Sabha in India, was in attendance. Romano Prodi, former Italian prime minister, was in attendance.

== See also ==
- Foreign relations of China
- Summit for Democracy
- Foreign Policy of Xi Jinping
- Xi Jinping Thought on Diplomacy
