= Yancheng railway station =

Railway station in Jiangsu

Yancheng 盐城站
- Station building (West Plaza, September 2026; station name calligraphed by Zhu Wenquan)

General information
- Location: Tinghu, Yancheng, Jiangsu; China
- Coordinates: 33°22′31″N 120°10′49″E
- Lines: Xinyi–Jingjiang railway; Qingdao–Yancheng railway; Xuzhou–Yancheng HSR; Yancheng–Nantong HSR
- Platforms: 8

History
- Opened: June 2004; 15 December 2019 (new station building)
Location

Yancheng station (Chinese: 盐城站) is located in Tinghu, Yancheng, Jiangsu, China. The Xinyi–Jingjiang railway (the northern section of the Xinyi–Changxing railway), the Qingdao–Yancheng railway, the Xuzhou–Yancheng HSR, and the Yancheng–Nantong HSR pass through the station.

== History ==
=== First-generation station building ===
Yancheng Station was first put into operation in June 2004 with the opening of the Yancheng section of the Xinyi–Changxing railway. The station is located at No. 69 Fangong Road. (Note: The original site was located at 33°23′2.68″N 120°10′10.77″E) Due to the small size of the station building, it was soon insufficient for use. Therefore, the local government invested RMB 210 million to rebuild the station building.

=== Second-generation station building ===
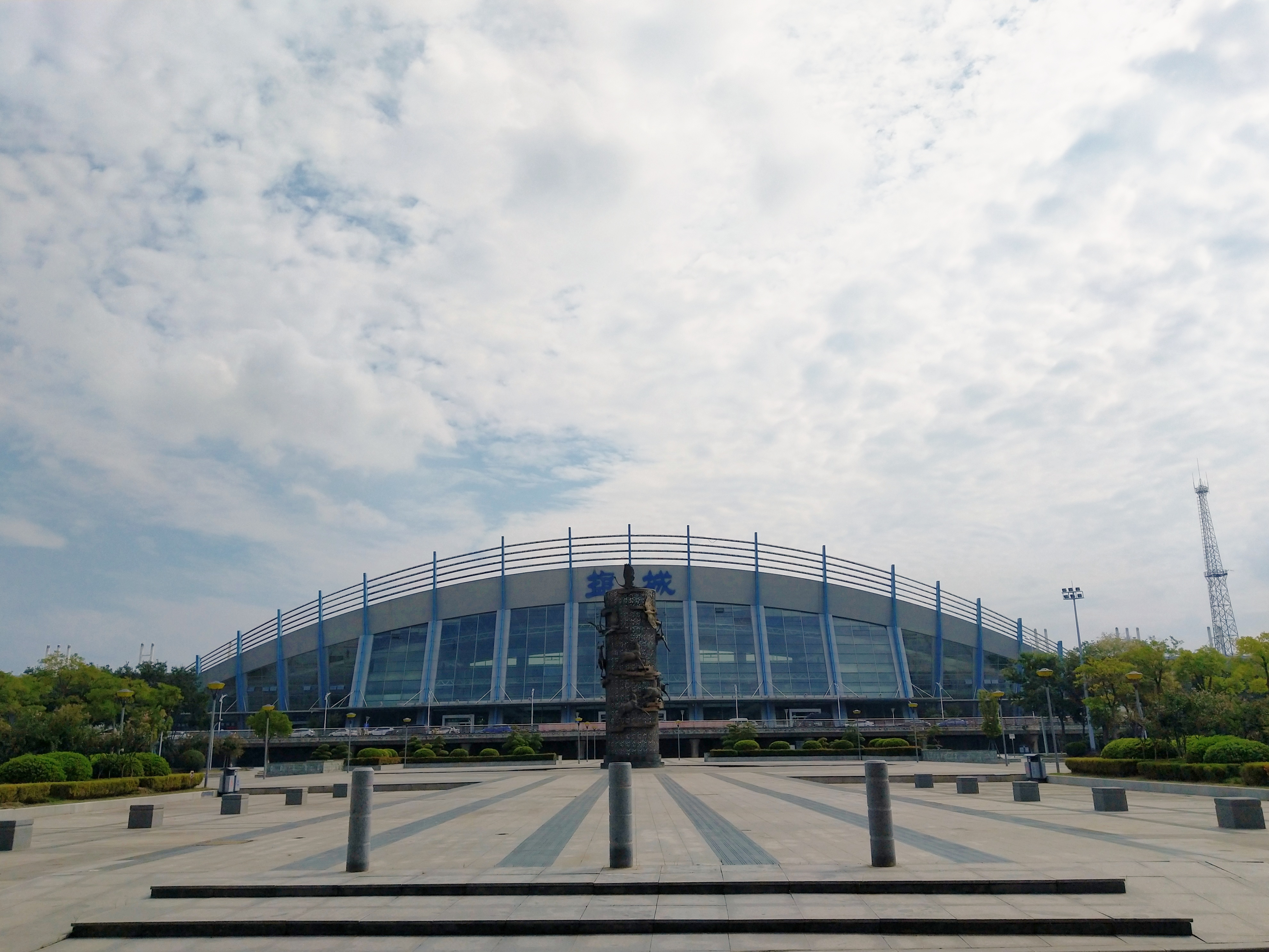
The second-generation station building of Yancheng Railway Station (built in August 2018) has now been transformed into the China Yellow Sea Wetland Museum

The new station building started construction in April 2006 and was put into use on 18 April 2007. It adopts an integrated design with the nearby Yancheng bus station, with a building area of 10,603 m^{2} (114,130 sq ft). The main building has two floors and a partial three-story structure. The station area is covered by a canopy without platform columns, which has won the National Excellent Welding Engineering Award.

After the 2010s, the railway department planned to build five high-speed railway lines. In order to connect to these new lines, the railway department planned to renovate the existing Yancheng hub. The Shanghai Railway Bureau originally planned to renovate and expand the existing Yancheng station building, but the local government of Yancheng preferred to build a new station in another location. After several consultations between the local government and the railway department, China Railway Corporation officially agreed in writing in July 2016 that Yancheng station would be relocated and rebuilt as part of the Xuzhou–Yancheng HSR project. Subsequently, the local government and the railway department began to solicit design schemes for the new station, and finally selected the scheme of the East China Architectural Design Institute and the China Railway Shanghai Design Institute from nine schemes. The second-generation station building was officially closed at 21:00 on 14 December 2019, after handling the last passenger train T216.

After the new Yancheng station was put into use, the second-generation Yancheng Station building was converted into the China Yellow Sea Wetland Museum, which opened on 10 January 2022. The existing two-platform, four-track column-free canopy station was preserved in its original state, and boardwalks were added between the platforms. The ballast was used to build a gabion wall landscape, forming a railway park. The northern part of the station was converted into a hotel lobby.

=== Third-generation station building ===
The building of the new Yancheng Station started on 20 January 2017 and was put into use on 15 December 2019. During the renovation, the Qingdao–Yancheng railway was put into operation on 26 December 2018, and the Yancheng North station temporarily took over the EMU passenger service.

On 30 December 2020, the Yancheng–Nantong high-speed railway was opened to traffic and high-speed trains heading south to Shanghai started running from Yancheng Station.

== Station Structure ==
The station building currently in use at Yancheng Station was put into operation on 15 December 2019, with the design concept of a "salt crystal".

=== Station ===
The new Yancheng Station, which was put into use in 2019, is divided into a high-speed section and a conventional section. The high-speed section is served by the Xuzhou–Yancheng high-speed railway and has one side platform, two island platforms, six arrival and departure tracks, and two main lines. The conventional section has one side platform and one island platform (shared with the high-speed section), with two arrival and departure tracks and two main lines.
