= Tinghu, Yancheng =

Tinghu 亭湖区
- District
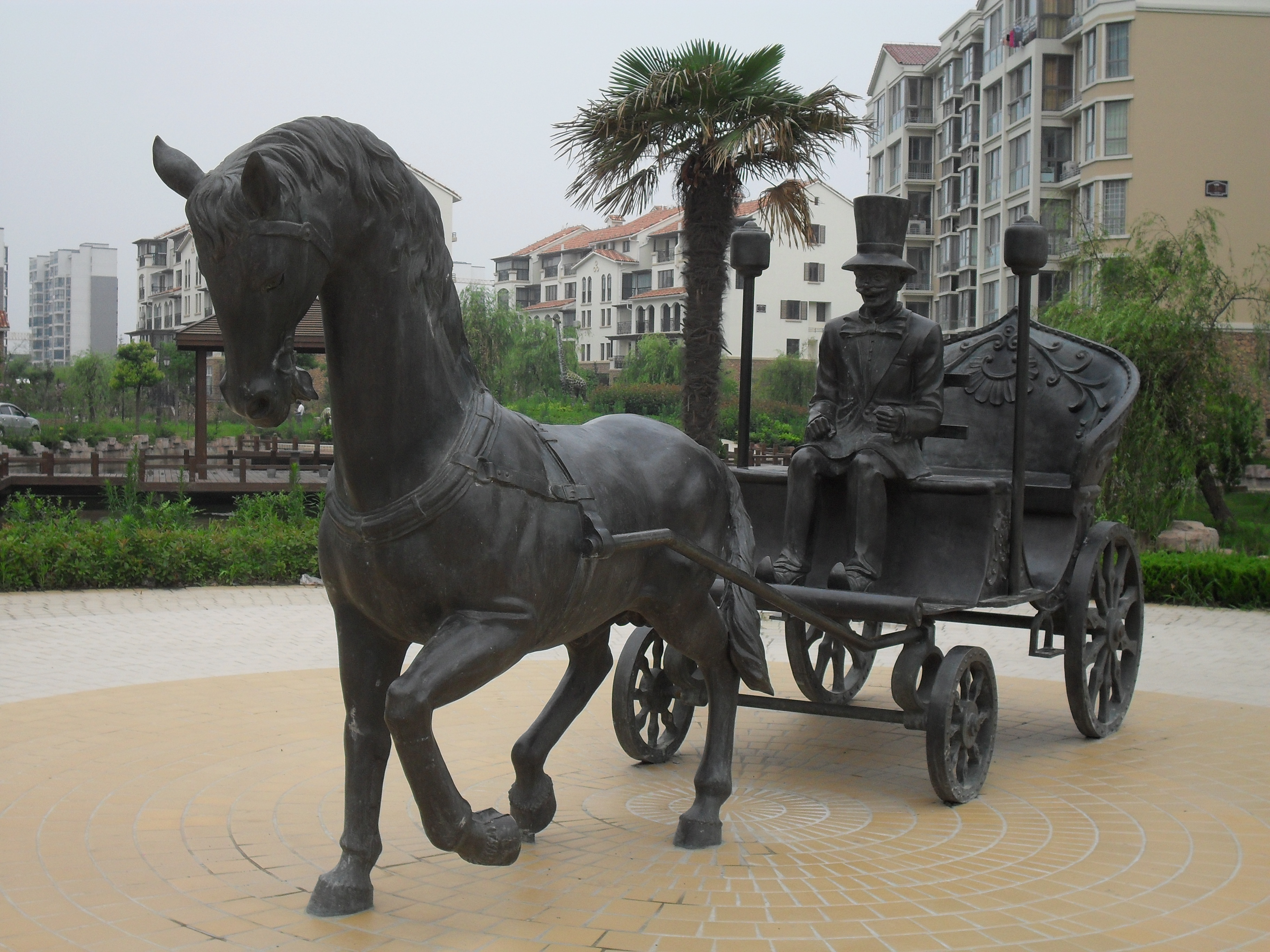
- Bronze sculpture in Tinghu District

- Location in Jiangsu
- Coordinates: 33°23′24″N 120°13′52″E
- Country: People's Republic of China
- Province: Jiangsu
- Prefecture-level city: Yancheng

Area
  - Total: 800 km^{2} (310 sq mi)

Population
  - Total: 911,200
  - Density: 1,100/km^{2} (2,900/sq mi)
- Time zone: UTC+8 (China Standard)
- Postal code: 224001-224005

Tinghu District (simplified Chinese: 亭湖区; traditional Chinese: 亭湖區; pinyin: Tínghú Qū) is one of three districts of Yancheng, Jiangsu province, China. (The other two are Yandu District and Dafeng District). Prior to 2004, Tinghu District was called the Chengqu (城区; 城區; Chéngqū) of Yancheng.

== Administrative divisions ==
At present, Tinghu District has 9 subdistricts and 6 townships.

9 subdistricts

- Wuxing (五星街道
- Wenfeng (文峰街道
- Xianfeng (先锋街道
- Yulong (毓龙街道
- Dayang (大洋街道
- Huanghai (黄海街道
- Xinyang (新洋街道
- Xincheng ((新城街道
- Wuyou (伍佑街道

6 towns

- Nanyang (南洋镇
- Xinxing (新兴镇
- Biancang (便仓镇
- Bufeng (步凤镇
- Huangjian (黄尖镇
- Yandong (盐东镇
