= Line 1 (Xuzhou Metro) =

Metro line in Xuzhou, China

- 1
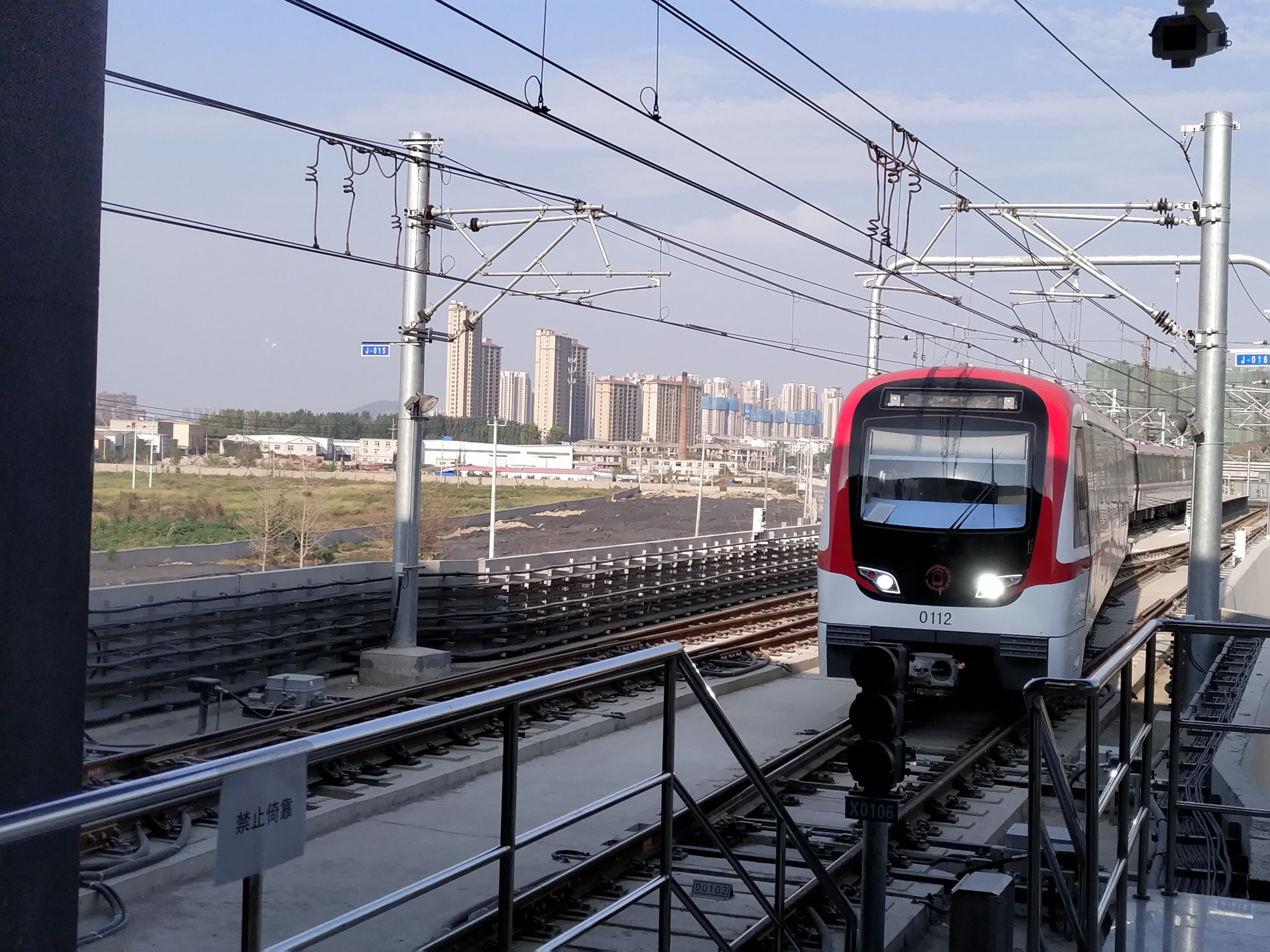
- Line 1 Train approaching Luwo Station

Overview
- Native name: 徐州地铁1号线
- Status: Operational
- Locale: Xuzhou, Jiangsu
- Termini: Luwo; Xuzhoudong Railway Station
- Stations: 18

Service
- Type: Rapid transit
- System: Xuzhou Metro
- Rolling stock: 6-car Type B (CRRC Nanjing Puzhen)

History
- Opened: 28 September 2019; 6 years ago

Technical
- Line length: 21.970 km (13.652 mi)
- Number of tracks: 2
- Character: Underground, elevated
- Operating speed: 80 km/h (50 mph)

Line 1 of the Xuzhou Metro (Chinese: 徐州地铁1号线; pinyin: Xúzhōu dìtiě yī hào xiàn) is a rapid transit line in Xuzhou city, Jiangsu province, China. Construction commenced in February 2014, and the line was opened on September 28, 2019. It is the first metro line to open in Xuzhou.

Line 1 runs primarily east-west through Xuzhou's main commercial areas, from Luwo in the west to Xuzhou East railway station in the east. It connects the old city, Bashan area, Chengdong New Area, People's Square, Huaihai Square, and Pengcheng Square. It also connects to both major railway stations in the city.

== Opening timeline ==
Segment	Commencement	Length	Station(s)	Name
Luwo — Xuzhoudong Railway Station	28 September 2019	21.967 km (13.65 mi)	18	Phase 1

== Line overview ==
Phase 1 stations (from west to east)
Station Name		Platform Type	Connections	Location
English	Chinese	Platform Type	Connections	Location
Luwo	路窝	Elevated, side		Tongshan
Xingshanzi	杏山子	Underground, island	S3	Tongshan / Quanshan
Hanshan	韩山	Underground, island		Quanshan
Gongnonglu	工农路	Underground, island		Quanshan
Renminguangchang	人民广场	Underground, island	5	Quanshan
Sudilu	苏堤路	Underground, island		Quanshan
The Affiliated Hospital of Xuzhou Medical University	徐医附院	Underground, island		Quanshan
Pengchengguangchang	彭城广场	Underground, island	2	Gulou / Yunlong
Minzhubeilu	民主北路	Underground, island		Gulou
Xuzhou Railway Station	徐州火车站	Underground, island	3	Gulou / Yunlong
Zifangshan	子房山	Underground, island		Yunlong
Tongshanlu	铜山路	Underground, island		Yunlong
Huangshanlong	黄山垅	Underground, island	5	Yunlong
Qingfenglu	庆丰路	Underground, island		Yunlong
Xuzhou Medical University	医科大学	Underground, island		Yunlong
Qiaojiahu	乔家湖	Underground, island	4	Yunlong
Jinlonghu	金龙湖	Underground, island		Jiawang
Xuzhoudong Railway Station	徐州东站	Underground, island	6 7	Jiawang

== History ==
As of June 2018, the civil engineering work was reported to be 95% complete, leaving mostly track laying, decorations, and electromechanical installations to be completed. On August 30, 2018, railway work was declared complete, and electromechanical installations and decorations declared as "under intense progress".
