= List of longest subway tunnel sections =

This page presents a list of the longest continuous underground rapid transit tunnel sections of the world, excluding branches from the longest tunnel (branch lines that used to transport passengers should be included).

Note: This article only lists tunnels that are 15 km (9.32 miles) or longer.

== World's longest subway tunnel sections in use ==
Name	System	Country	Stations	Length in km (mi)	Year of completion
Lines 3-11	Suzhou Metro	China	Line 3 and Line 11 are connected at Weiting Station with through trains passing by.	86.54 km (53.77 mi)	2019–2023
M11	Istanbul Metro	Turkey	Gayrettepe – Halkalı	69 km (43 mi)	2023–2025
Line 6	Chengdu Metro	China	Wangcong Temple – Lanjiagou	68.2 km (42.4 mi)	2020
Line 3	Guangzhou Metro	China	Haibang – Airport North	68.2 km (42.4 mi)	2005–2024
Line 19	Chengdu Metro	China	Huangshi to Tianfu	67 km (42 mi)	2020–2023
Line 7	Wuhan Metro	China	Tenglong Boulevard – Qinglongshan Ditiexiaozhen	63.14 km (39.23 mi)	2018–2024
Line 12	Wuhan Metro	China	Circle route	59.9 km (37.2 mi)	2026
Line 1	Qingdao Metro	China	Dongguozhuang to Wangjiagang	59.82 km (37.17 mi)	2020–2021
Line 18	Guangzhou Metro	China	Xiancun to Wanqingsha	58.3 km (36.2 mi)	2021
Bolshaya Koltsevaya line	Moscow Metro	Russia	Circle route	57.54 km (35.75 mi)	2018–2023
Line 10	Beijing Subway	China	Circle route	57.024 km (35.433 mi)	2008–2013
Line 5	Hangzhou Metro	China	East Nanhu - Guniangqiao	56.21km (34.93 mi)	2019–2025
Line 6	Beijing Subway	China	Jin'anqiao–Luyang	55.5 km (34.5 mi)	2012-2025
Line 7	Guangzhou Metro	China	Meidi Dadao – Yanshan	54.24 km (33.70 mi)	2016–2023
Line 2	Wuhan Metro	China	Julong Boulevard – Fozuling	52.9 km (32.9 mi)	2012–2019
Line 8	Zhengzhou Metro	China	Tianjianhu – Lumiao	51.8 km (32.2 mi)	2024
Seoul Subway Line 5 (longest branch)	Seoul Subway	South Korea	Banghwa–Hanam Geomdansan	51.7 km (32.1 mi)	1995–2021
Line 2	Wuhan Metro	China	Julong Boulevard - Fozuling	50.347 km (31.284 mi)	2012–2019
Line 8	Xi'an Metro	China	Circle route	49.9 km (31.0 mi)	2024
Line 16	Beijing Subway	China	Bei'anhe – Wanpingcheng	48.9 km (30.4 mi)	2016–2023
Line 17	Beijing Subway	China	Weilaikexuechengbei (Future Science City North) – Jiahuihu	48.9 km (30.4 mi)	2021–2025
Sokolnicheskaya line	Moscow Metro	Russia	Potapovo – Bulvar Rokossovskogo	47 km (29 mi)	1935–2024
Arbatsko-Pokrovskaya line	Moscow Metro	Russia	Pyatnitskoye Shosse – Shchyolkovskaya	45.1 km (28.0 mi)	1938–2012
Lyublinsko-Dmitrovskaya line	Moscow Metro	Russia	Zyablikovo – Fiztekh	44.3 km (27.5 mi)	1995–2023
Line 11	Guangzhou Metro	China	Longtan – Chisha	43.2 km (26.8 mi)	2024
Zhengxu line	Zhengzhou Metro	China	Chang'an Lu Bei – Baqian	42.9 km (26.7 mi)	2023
Zamoskvoretskaya line	Moscow Metro	Russia	Khovrino – Alma-Atinskaya	42.8 km (26.6 mi)	1938–2018
Line 8	Beijing Subway	China	Yuzhi Lu – Wufutang	42.6 km (26.5 mi)	2012–2021
Line 6	Wuhan Metro	China	Xincheng 11th Road – Dongfeng Motor Corporation	42.5 km (26.4 mi)	2016–2021
Line 15	Shanghai Metro	China	Gucun Park – Zizhu Hi-tech Park	42.3 (26.3)	2021
Line 5	Chengdu Metro	China	Jiudaoyan – Huilong	42.3 (26.3)	2019
Tagansko-Krasnopresnenskaya line	Moscow Metro	Russia	Planernaya – Kotelniki	42.2 (26.2)	1966–2015
Line 1	Xi'an Metro	China	Xianyangxizhan – Fangzhicheng	42.2 (26.2)	2013–2023
Line 14	Beijing Subway	China	Dawayao – Shangezhuang	42 (26)	2015–2021
Line 6	Tianjin Metro	China	Nanhezhuang – Lushuidao	42 (26)	2016–2021
Downtown MRT line	Mass Rapid Transit (Singapore)	Singapore	Bukit Panjang – Expo	41.9 (26)	2013–2017
Line 2	Xiamen Metro	China	Tianzhushan – Wuyuanwan	41.6 (25.9)	2019
Line 3	Nanjing Metro	China	Xinghuolu – Mozhoudonglu	41.5 (25.8)	2015
Line 4	Suzhou Metro	China	Longdaobang — Tongli	41.5 (25.8)	2017
Serpukhovsko-Timiryazevskaya line	Moscow Metro	Russia	Altufyevo – Bulvar Dmitriya Donskogo	41.2 (25.6)	1983–2002
Line 1	Zhengzhou Metro	China	Henan University of Technology – New Campus of Henan University	41.2 km (25.60 mi)	2013–2019
L-12 (Metro Sur)	Madrid Metro	Spain	Circle route	40.96 (25.5)	2003
Toei Oedo Line	Toei Subway	Japan	Hikarigaoka – Tocho-mae	40.7 (25.3)	1991–2000
Seoul Subway Line 9	Seoul Subway	South Korea	Gimpo Airport – VHS Medical Center	40.6 km (25.2 mi)	2018
Line 6	Zhengzhou Metro	China	Donglinsi – Qinghua Fuzhong	40.5 km (25.2 mi)	2022-2024
Line 12	Shanghai Metro	China	Qixin Road – Jinhai Road	40.4 km (25.1 mi)	2015
Line 5	Zhengzhou Metro	China	Circle route	40.4 km (25.1 mi)	2019
Line 7	Beijing Subway	China	Beijing West railway station - Universal Resort	40.3 km (25.0 mi)	2021
Line 6	Xi'an Metro	China	Xi'annanzhan – Fangzhicheng	39.6 km (24.6 mi)	2020–2024
Line 11	Wuhan Metro	China	Jiang'an Road – Gediannan Railway Station	39.4 km (24.5 mi)	2018–2024
Line 4	Chengdu Metro	China	Wansheng – Chengdu University	39.3 km (24.4 mi)	2015–2017
Line 7	Chengdu Metro	China	Circle route	38.6 km (24.0 mi)	2017
Line 8	Wuhan Metro	China	Jintan Road – Military Athletes' Village	38.2 km (23.7 mi)	2017–2021
Kaluzhsko-Rizhskaya line	Moscow Metro	Russia	Medvedkovo – Novoyasenevskaya	37.8 (23.5)	1958–1990
Line 12	Guangzhou Metro	China	Xunfenggang – Higher Education Mega Center South	37.6 (23.36)	2025
Line 1	Chengdu Metro	China	Weijianian – Science City	37.47 (23.3)	2010–2018
Line 2	Shenzhen Metro	China	Chiwan – Xinxiu	35.78 (22.23)	2011
Busan Subway Line 2	Busan Transportation Corporation	South Korea	Jangsan–Dongwon	35.5 (22.06)	1999
Metro North West & Bankstown Line	Sydney Metro	Australia	Cherrybrook – Sydenham	35.5 km (22.1 mi)	2009–2024
Line 4	Xi'an Metro	China	Xi'an Beizhan – Hangtianxincheng	35.2 (21.9)	2018
Seoul Subway Line 6	Seoul Subway	South Korea	Eungam Loop – Bonghwasan	35.1 (21.8)	2001
Seoul Subway Line 7 (longest branch)	Seoul Subway	South Korea	Cheongdam – Bupyeong-gu Office	35.1 (21.7)	2012
Line 5	Tianjin Metro	China	Beichenkejiyuanbei – Liqizhuangnan	34.8 (21.6)	2018–2021
Line 7	Shanghai Metro	China	Panguang Road – Huamu Road	34.4 (21.38)	2010
Line 8	Guangzhou Metro	China	Wanshengwei—Jiaoxin	33.9 (21.1)	2010–2020
Line 1	Ürümqi Metro	China	Santunbei – International Airport	33.7 km (20.9 mi)	2019
Line 2	Xi'an Metro	China	Caotan –Changninggong	33.6 (20.9)	2011–2023
M4	Istanbul Metro	Turkey	Kadıköy – Sabiha Gökçen Havalimanı	33.5 (20.8)	2012–2022
Circle MRT line	Mass Rapid Transit (Singapore)	Singapore	Dhoby Ghaut – HarbourFront	33.3 (20.69)	2009–2012
Line 3	Wuhan Metro	China	Zhuanyang Boulevard – Hongtu Boulevard	33.2 km (20.63 mi)	2015
L-7	Madrid Metro	Spain	Hospital del Henares – Pitis	32.9 (20.5)	2007
U7	Berlin U-Bahn	Germany	Rathaus Spandau-Rudow	31.8 (19.7)	1924–1984
Line 3	Zhengzhou Metro	China	Henan Sports Center - Binhe Xincheng Nan	31.8 (19.7)	2020-2023
Line 3	Mumbai Metro	India	SEEPZ – Cuffe Parade	31.2 km (19.4 mi)	2024–2025
Bucharest Metro Line M1	Bucharest Metro	Romania	Pantelimon – Dristor 2	31.01 km (19.3 mi)	1979–1991
Line 1	Beijing Subway	China	Pingguoyuan – Dawang Lu	31.0 (19.3)	1971–2000
Line 2	Zhengzhou Metro	China	Jiahe – Nansihuan	30.9 km (19.2)	2016–2019
Solntsevskaya line	Moscow Metro	Russia	Aeroport Vnukovo – Delovoy Tsentr	30.9 (19.2)	2014–2023
M5	Istanbul Metro	Turkey	Üsküdar – Sultanbeyli	30.9 (12.5)	2017–2026
IND Eighth Avenue Line and IND Fulton Street Line	New York City Subway	United States	Inwood – 207th Street – Grant Avenue	30.8 (19.14)	1956
Line 2 Orange	Montreal Metro	Canada	Côte-Vertu – Montmorency	30.8 (19.14)	2007
Thomson–East Coast line	Mass Rapid Transit (Singapore)	Singapore	Woodlands North – Gardens by the Bay	30.4 km (18.9 mi)	2020–2022
Line 2	Shanghai Metro	China	East Xujing – Longyang Road	30.2 (18.77)	2010
Moskovsko-Petrogradskaya Line	Saint Petersburg Metro	Russia	Parnas–Kupchino	30.1 (18.7)	1961–2006
Line 8	Shanghai Metro	China	Shiguang Road – Luheng Road	29.7 (18.45)	2009
Kirovsko-Vyborgskaya Line	Saint Petersburg Metro	Russia	Devyatkino – Prospekt Veteranov	29.57 (18.4)	1955–1978
Line 4	Zhengzhou Metro	China	Laoyachen - Langzhuang	29.29 (18.2)	2020
Line 4	Wuhan Metro	China	Yong'antang – Wuhan Railway Station	29.2 (18.1)	2013–2019
Line 8	Chengdu Metro	China	(Phase 2 is 7.94 km)	29.1 (18.1)	2020
Line 13	Chengdu Metro	China	Qiligou – Longhuasi	29.07 km (18.06 mi)	2025
Line 2	Chengdu Metro	China	Tianhe Road – Chengdu Academy of Governance	29.0 (18.0)	2012–2013
Line 3	Wuxi Metro	China	Sumiao – Sunan Shuofang International Airport	28.8 (17.9)	2020
Bannan Line (Taipei Metro Blue Line)	Taipei Metro	Taiwan	Dingpu – Taipei Nangang Exhibition Center	28.2 (17.6)	1999–2015
Line 4	Beijing Subway	China	Anheqiao Bei (N) – Gongyi Xiqiao	28.2 (17.5)	2009–2010
Incheon Subway Line 1	Incheon Subway	South Korea	Bakchon – International Business District	27.9 (17.42)	1999–2009
Line 5	Wuhan Metro	China	East Square of Wuhan Railway Station – Fenghuocun	27.9 (17.42)	2021–2023
Line 14	Paris Métro	France	Saint-Denis–Pleyel – Aéroport d'Orly	27.8 (17.3)	1998–2024
Northern line	London Underground	United Kingdom	Morden – East Finchley	27.8 (17.2)	1890–1940
Nevsko-Vasileostrovskaya Line	Saint Petersburg Metro	Russia	Begovaya–Rybatskoye	27.7 (17.2)	1967–2018
Tanimachi Line	Osaka Metro	Japan	Dainichi–Nagahara	27.1 (16.7)	1967–1983
Line 1	Milan Metro	Italy	The whole line is underground	27 km (17 mi)	1964–2005
Line 7	Zhengzhou Metro	China	Dongzhao – Nangangliu	26.8 (16.7)	2024
M3	Istanbul Metro	Turkey	Bakırköy Sahil – Şehir Hastanesi Viaduct	26.7 (16.6)	2013–2025
Meijo Line	Nagoya Municipal Subway	Japan	Circle route	26.4 (16.4)	1965–2004
B Line	Los Angeles Metro Rail	United States	North Hollywood - Union Station	26.4 (16.4)	1993–2000
Line 30	Chengdu Metro	China	(Phase 1 is 26.28 km)	26.28 km (16.33 mi)	2025
Frunzensko-Primorskaya Line	Saint Petersburg Metro	Russia	Komendantsky Prospekt – Shushary	26.2 (16.3)	1997–2019
Line 1	Suzhou Metro	China	Mudu – Zhongnan Jie	25.7 (16.0)	2012
Line 4	Wuxi Metro	China	Liutan – Wuxi Taihu International Expo Center	25.4 km (15.8 mi)	2021
Line 3	Athens Metro	Greece	Dimotiko Theatro – Doukissis Plakentias	25.3 (15.72)	2023
Line 9	Xi'an Metro	China	Fangzhicheng – Qinlingxi	25.2 (15.7)	2020
Helsinki Metro	Helsinki Metro	Finland	Kalasatama – Kivenlahti	25.2 (15.7)	1982–2022
Orange Line	Taipei Metro	Taiwan	Huilong–Nanshijiao	25.1 (15.6) (longest branch)	1998–2013
Line 3	Santiago Metro	Chile	Plaza de Quilicura - Fernando Castillo Velasco	25 (13.5)	2019–2023
Line 3	Xi'an Metro	China	Yuhuazhai –Guangtaimen	24.8 (15.4)	2016
Line 3	Xuzhou Metro	China	Zhenxingdadao – Gaoxinqu'nan	24.7 (15.3)	2021–2024
Yurakucho Line	Tokyo Metro	Japan	Chikatetsu Narimasu – Tatsumi	24.6 (15.3)	1974–1988
U2	Munich U-Bahn	Germany	Feldmoching – Messestadt Ost	24.4 (15.2)	1980–2001
Line 2	Xuzhou Metro	China	Keyunbei – Xinchengqudong	24.4 (15.1)	2020
Yellow Line	Delhi Metro	India	Guru Tegh Bahadur Nagar – Saket	24 km (15 mi)	2009–2010
L-1	Madrid Metro	Spain	Valdecarros – Pinar de Chamartín	23.88 (14.84)	1919–2007
L-6	Madrid Metro	Spain	Circle route	23.47 (14.58)	1979–2007
Line 9	Shanghai Metro	China	Jiuting – Middle Yanggao Road	23.3 (14.48)	2007–2010
Line 1 Green	Montreal Metro	Canada	Angrignon – Honoré-Beaugrand	23.26 (14.45)	1966–1978
Warsaw Metro M1	Warsaw Metro	Poland	Kabaty–Młociny	23.1 (14.35)	1995–2008
Line 2	Beijing Subway	China	Circle route	23.1 (14.35)	1984–1987
IND Eighth Avenue Line	New York City Subway	United States	207th Street station – High Street	23 (14 mi)	1932–1933
Line 6	Xuzhou Metro	China	Xuzhou Tongshan District Hospital of TCM – Xuzhoudong Railway Station	22.9 (14.2)	2025
Line 19	Wuhan Metro	China	West Square of Wuhan Railway Station – Xinyuexi Park	22.7km (14.1mi)	2023
Bucharest Metro Line M3	Bucharest Metro	Romania	Preciziei – Anghel Saligny	22.20 km (13.79 mi)	1983–2008
Line 9	Chengdu Metro	China	Phase 1 of the second loop line in Chengdu, all underground	22.18 km (13.78 mi)	2020
Line 19	Beijing Subway	China	Mudanyuan – Xingong	20.9 (13)	2021
Line 10	Zhengzhou Metro	China	Zhengzhou Railway Station – Zhengzhouxi Railway Station	21.9 (13.6)	2023
Namboku Line	Tokyo Metro	Japan	Meguro – Akabane-Iwabuchi	21.3 (13.2)	1991–2000
Songshan-Xindian Line (Taipei Metro Green Line)	Taipei Metro	Taiwan	Songshan-Xindian	21.3 (13.2)	1998–2014
Line 4	Shanghai Metro	China	Hailun Road – Yishan Road	21.1 (13.11)	2005–2007
Toei Mita Line	Toei Subway	Japan	Meguro – Shimura-Sakaue	21.1 (13.11)	1968–2000
Victoria line	London Underground	United Kingdom	Walthamstow Central – Brixton	21.0 (13.05)	1968–1971
Obolonsko–Teremkivska line	Kyiv Metro	Ukraine	Heroiv Dnipra–Teremky	20.95 (13.02)	1976–2013
Line 6	Shanghai Metro	China	Boxing Road – Oriental Sports Center	20.34 (12.64)	2007–2011
Line 1	Barcelona Metro	Spain	Fondo – Hospital de Bellvitge	20.2 (12.56)	1926–1989
Tozai Line	Sapporo Municipal Subway	Japan	Miyanosawa – Shin-Sapporo	20.1 (12.4)	1976–1999
M1	Ankara Metro	Turkey	Koru – Atatürk Kültür Merkezi	20.1 (12.4)	1997–2014
Red Line	Baku Metro	Azerbaijan	Icheri Sheher – Hazi Aslanov	20.1 (12.4)	1967–2002
L-5	Madrid Metro	Spain	Alameda de Osuna – Empalme	20.005 (12.5)	1968–2006
Line 9	Barcelona Metro	Spain	Zona Universitaria – Aeroport T1	20.0 (12.5)	2004–2016
North East MRT line	Mass Rapid Transit (Singapore)	Singapore	HarbourFront–Punggol	20.0 (12.43)	2003–2011
Line 7 (longest branch)	Paris Métro	France	La Courneuve–8 mai 1945 – Villejuif–Louis Aragon	19.8 (12.3)	1910–1987
Line 2	Tianjin Metro	China	Caozhuang – Guoshanlu	19.7 (12.2)	2012–2014
Nekrasovskaya line	Moscow Metro	Russia	Nizhegorodskaya – Nekrasovka	19.6 (12.2)	2019–2020
Line 9	Paris Métro	France	Pont de Sèvres – Mairie de Montreuil	19.6 (12.2)	1922–1937
M2	Istanbul Metro	Turkey	Şişhane – Hacıosman; Line is 23,49 km long, but the longest continuous underground section is 19.54 km long.	19.54 (12.14)	2000–2014
Red, Yellow, Blue, and Green Lines	Bay Area Rapid Transit, San Francisco	United States	Balboa Park – West Oakland	19.5 (12.12)	1973
Line 5	Xi'an Metro	China	Huanlegu – Yuedengge	19.5 (12.12)	2020–2024
Kol'tsevaya Line	Moscow Metro	Russia	Circle route	19.4 (12.2)	1950–1954
U3	Munich U-Bahn	Germany	Moosach – Fürstenried West	19.4 (12.05)	1972–2009
Line 4	Tianjin Metro	China	Dongnanjiao – Xinxingcun	19.4 (12)	2021
Line 3	Tianjin Metro	China	Huayuan – Tianshili	19.2 (11.9)	2012–2013
Midosuji Line	Osaka Metro	Japan	Nakatsu – Nakamozu	19.1 (11.87)	1933–1987
Maskoŭskaja line	Minsk Metro	Belarus	Malinawka–Uruchcha	19.1 (11.9)	1984–2014
Sakuradori Line	Nagoya Municipal Subway	Japan	Taiko-dori – Tokushige	19.1 (11.87)	1989–2011
Line 5	Barcelona Metro	Spain	Vall d'Hebron – Cornella centre	19.0 (11.8)	1955–2010
Tsurumai Line	Nagoya Municipal Subway	Japan	Shōnai Ryokuchi Kōen – Akaike	19.0 (11.8)	1977–1993
Warsaw Metro M2	Warsaw Metro	Poland	Bemowo–Bródno	18.9 km (11.7 mi)	2015–2022
Mexico City Metro Line 3	Mexico City Metro	Mexico	La Raza – Universidad	18.7 (11.62)	1970–1983
Bucharest Metro Line M2	Bucharest Metro	Romania	Pipera – Berceni	18.7 (11.6 mi)	1986 - 1987
Line 7 (shorter branch)	Paris Métro	France	La Courneuve–8 mai 1945 – Mairie d'Ivry	18.5 (11.5)	1910–1987
Line A	Rome Metro	Italy	Battistini – Anagnina	18.43 (11.45 mi)	1989–2000
Line 3	Barcelona Metro	Spain	Zona Universitària – Trinitat Nova	18.4 (11.44)	1925–2008
Toei Asakusa Line	Toei Subway	Japan	Nishi-magome – Oshiage	18.4 (11.44)	1960
Chiyoda line	Tokyo Metro	Japan	Yoyogi-koen – Kita-Senju	18.3 (11.37)	1969
U8	Berlin U-Bahn	Germany	Wittenau – Hermannstraße	18.1 (11.25)	1927–1996
Blue Line	Yokohama Municipal Subway	Japan	Konan-Chuo – Kita Shin-Yokohama	18.1 (11.25)	1972–1999
Avtozavodskaya Line	Minsk Metro	Belarus	Kamennaya Gorka – Mogilevskaya	18.1 (11.25)	1990–2005
Line 1	Shanghai Metro	China	Shanghai South Railway – Shanghai Circus World	18.1 (11.25)	1993–2004
Line B	Prague Metro	Czechia	Rajská zahrada – Hůrka	18.0 (11.2)	1998
Line 16	Wuhan Metro	China	South International Expo Center – Dajunshan	17.8 (11.1)	2021–2022
Line 2	Athens Metro	Greece	Anthoupoli – Elliniko	17.9 (11.12)	2013
Line 5	Beijing Subway	China	Huixin Xijie Beikou – Songjiazhuang	17.8 (11.1)	2007
Washington, DC Metro Red Line	Washington Metro	United States	Union Station – Medical Center	17.8 (11.05)	1984
Line 15	Beijing Subway	China	Qinghua Donglu Xikou – Maquanying	17.6 (10.9)	2014
Higashiyama Line	Nagoya Municipal Subway	Japan	Takabata – Issha	17.5 (10.92)	1957–1982
Tozai Line	Kyoto Municipal Subway	Japan	Uzumasa Tenjingawa-Yamashina-Rokujizō	17.5 (10.92)	1997–2008
Line 27	Chengdu Metro	China	Shuxin Road - Fanjia Alley	17.34 km (10.77 mi)	2024
Line 4	Barcelona Metro	Spain	Trinitat Nova – La Pau	17.3 (10.76)	1908–1999
Kholodnohirsko–Zavodska line	Kharkiv Metro	Ukraine	Kholodna Hora – Industrialna	17.3 (10.7)	1975–1978
Line 12	Paris Métro	France	Mairie d'Aubervilliers – Mairie d'Issy	17.2 (10.7)	1910–2022
Line 3	Milan Metro	Italy	Comasina – San Donato	17.105 (10.62)	1990–2011
Tōzai Line	Tokyo Metro	Japan	Nakano–Minami-Sunamachi	17.0 (10.56)	1964–1969
M1	İzmir Metro	Turkey	Narlıdere Kaymakamlık – Basmane; Line is 27 km long, but only 19.8 km of it is underground in two noncontinuous sections. The shorter underground section is 2.9 km long.	16.9 (10.5)	2000–2024
Line 13 (longest branch)	Paris Métro	France	Malakoff–Plateau de Vanves – Saint-Denis-Université	16.8 (10.5)	1911–1998
Hanzomon Line	Tokyo Metro	Japan	Shibuya-Oshiage	16.8 (10.4)	1978–2003
Mexico City Metro Line 1	Mexico City Metro	Mexico	Observatorio – Pantitlán	16.7 (10.38)	1984
Blue Line	Chennai Metro	India	Saidapet - Tondiarpet	16.6 km (10.3 mi)	2018–2021
Line 9	Beijing Subway	China	National Library – Guogongzhuang	16.5 (10.3)	2012
Line 1	Xiamen Metro	China	Gaoqi – Zhenhai Road	16.5 (10.3)	
Line 17	Beijing Subway	China	Shilihe – Jiahuihu	16.5 (10.3)	2021
Line 12	Zhengzhou Metro	China	Longzihu Dong – Lianghu	16.5 (10.3)	2023
L-3	Madrid Metro	Spain	Villaverde Alto – Moncloa	16.42 (10.2)	2007
Line 1	Chongqing Rail Transit	China	Chaotianmen – Shapingba	16.4 (10.2)	2011
Line A	Prague Metro	Czechia	Nemocnice Motol – Depo Hostivař; Line is 17.1 km long, but only 16.4 km of it is underground.	16.4 (10.2)	2015
Hibiya Line	Tokyo Metro	Japan	Ebisu – Minowa	16.4 (10.2)	1961
Kalininskaya line	Moscow Metro	Russia	Tretyakovskaya – Novokosino	16.3 (10.1)	1979–2012
Line 8	Paris Métro	France	Balard – Charenton–Écoles	16.2 (10.1)	1913–1942
L-4	Madrid Metro	Spain	Argüelles – Pinar de Chamartín	16.0 (9.9)	2007
Sviatoshynsko–Brovarska line	Kyiv Metro	Ukraine	Akademmistechko–Dnipro	16.0 (9.9)	1960–2003
Seoul Subway Line 7 (shorter section)	Seoul Subway	South Korea	Suraksan – Konkuk University	16.0 (9.9)	1996
U6	Berlin U-Bahn	Germany	Alt-Mariendorf – Kurt-Schumacher-Platz	15.9 (9.86)	1923–1966
M9	Istanbul Metro	Turkey	Ataköy – Olimpiyat Viaduct	15.8 (9.8)	2013–2024
Line B	Toulouse Metro	France	Borderouge to Ramonville	15.7 (9.8)	2007
M3 Line	Copenhagen Metro	Denmark	Circle route	15.5 km (9.6 mi)	2019
Line 3	Budapest Metro	Hungary	Határ út–Újpest-központ; Line is 17.39 km long, but only 15.5 km of it is underground.	15.5 km (9.6 mi)	1990
Line 1	Tianjin Metro	China	Qinjiandao – Tucheng	15.37 (9.55)	2006
Line 6	Santiago Metro	Chile	Cerrillos – Los Leones	15.3 (9.5)	2017
Syretsko–Pecherska line	Kyiv Metro	Ukraine	Syrets – Pivdennyi Bridge	15.2 (9.4)	1989–2004
Line 4	Milan Metro	Italy	San Cristoforo FS – Linate Aeroporto	15.2 km (9.4 mi)	2022–2024
Blue Line	Kolkata Metro	India	Mahanayak Uttam Kumar – Dum Dum	15.17 km (9.43 mi)	1984–1995
Line 1	Turin Metro	Italy	Fermi – Bengasi	15.1 (9.4)	2006–2021
Line 16	Xi'an Metro	China	Qinchuangyuanzhongxin – Shijingli	15.03 (9.34)	2023
Island line	MTR	Hong Kong	Kennedy Town – Heng Fa Chuen	15.0 (9.32)	1985 (as Hong Kong)–2014
Nagahori Tsurumi-ryokuchi Line	Osaka Metro	Japan	Taisho – Kadoma-minami	15.0 (9.32)	1990–1997
Line 10	Chengdu Metro	China	Taipingyuan – Shuangliu West Railway Station	15.0 (9.32)	2019

== World's longest subway tunnel sections under construction ==
Name	System	Country	Stations	Length	Expected completion
Line 15	Paris Métro	France	Noisy–Champs - Champigny Centre; Circle route, all underground	75 km (47 mi)	Southern section: 2027; Full line: 2031
Cross Island line	Mass Rapid Transit (Singapore)	Singapore	Linear route with branch section, all underground (Excludes potential extension from Punggol to Seletar Airport under planning)	65.5 km (40.7 mi)	2030–2032
Suburban Rail Loop	Melbourne rail network	Australia	SRL East and North is underground (Cheltenham to Airport)	60 km (37 mi)	2035 (SRL East) 2043–2053 (SRL North)
Line 13	Guangzhou Metro	China	underground line (includes Phase II: Yagang – Tianhe Park under construction)	59.2 km (36.8 mi)	Phase 1：2017; Phase 2：2026
L9 / L10	Barcelona Metro	Spain		47.8 km (29.7 mi) (incl. branches)	2009 and 2016 partially; central section: 2028–2029
Line 13	Shenzhen Metro	China	Whole line is underground	45.72 km (28.41 mi)	Phase 1：2024; Phase 2 (North extension)：2025 South extension：2026
Thomson–East Coast line	Mass Rapid Transit (Singapore)	Singapore	Woodlands North to Sungei Bedok (Phases 4 and 5, Gardens by the Bay – Sungei Bedok are 13 km in length and are currently under construction, all underground)	43.4 km (27.0 mi)	Phase 4：2024; Phase 5：2H 2026
Green line	Baku Metro	Azerbaijan	Circle route, all underground	41.8 km (26.0 mi)	Loop's Southern extension to the East: 2030; Full line: 2040
Line 22	Shanghai Metro	China	Jinji Road - Dongtan	40.9 km (25.4 mi)	2026
Troitskaya line	Moscow Metro	Russia	Whole line is underground	40.2 km (25.0 mi)	Phase 1：2024 (25 km (16 mi)); Phase 2：2028–2029 (15.2 km (9.4 mi))
Athens Metro Line 4	Athens Metro	Greece		38.2 km (23.7 mi)	2029 for Phase 1
Metro Manila Subway	Manila Metro Rail Transit System	Philippines	Mindanao Avenue – Ninoy Aquino International Airport (All underground)	36 km (22 mi)	2029
Line 22	Shenzhen Metro	China	Shangsha - Liguang	34.2 km (21.3 mi)	Phase 1: 2029
Line 6	Nanjing Metro	China	Whole line is underground	32.4 km (20.1 mi)	2026
Line 15	Shenzhen Metro	China	Whole line is underground	32.2 km (20.0 mi)	2028
Circular line	Taipei Metro	Taiwan	Y19A – Dapinglin	29.7 km (18.5 mi)	2032
Line 16	Paris Métro	France	Saint-Denis–Pleyel - Noisy–Champs; All underground	27.5 km (17.1 mi)	Phase 1: 2026; Phase 2: 2028
Line 3	Chennai Metro	India	Madhavaram Milk Colony – Tharamani	27.09 km (16.83 mi)	2026–2027
D Line Extension	Los Angeles Metro	United States	Westwood/VA Hospital – Union Station	24.3 km (15.1 mi)	2025–2026
Metro West	Sydney Metro	Australia		24 km (15 mi)	2032
Metro Western Sydney Airport	Sydney Metro	Australia		23 km (14 mi)	2026
Line C	Toulouse Metro	France	Underground from Colomiers Gare to Montaudran Gare, full line will be 27 km long.	22 km (14 mi)	2028
Blue Line	Stockholm Metro	Sweden	The extension to Nacka will be around 8 km, all underground, total 22 km including older sections.	22 km (14 mi)	2030
M2	İzmir Metro	Turkey	Üçyol – Fuar İzmir; All underground	17.8 km (11.1 mi)	2027
Bucharest Metro Line M6	Bucharest Metro	Romania	Gara de Nord – Aeroportul Otopeni	17.8 km (11.1 mi)	2028–2029

== See also ==
- List of longest tunnels
- List of long tunnels by type
- List of longest railway tunnels
- List of long railway tunnels in China
- List of metro systems
