= Line 6 (Xuzhou Metro) =

Metro line in Xuzhou, Jiangsu

- 6
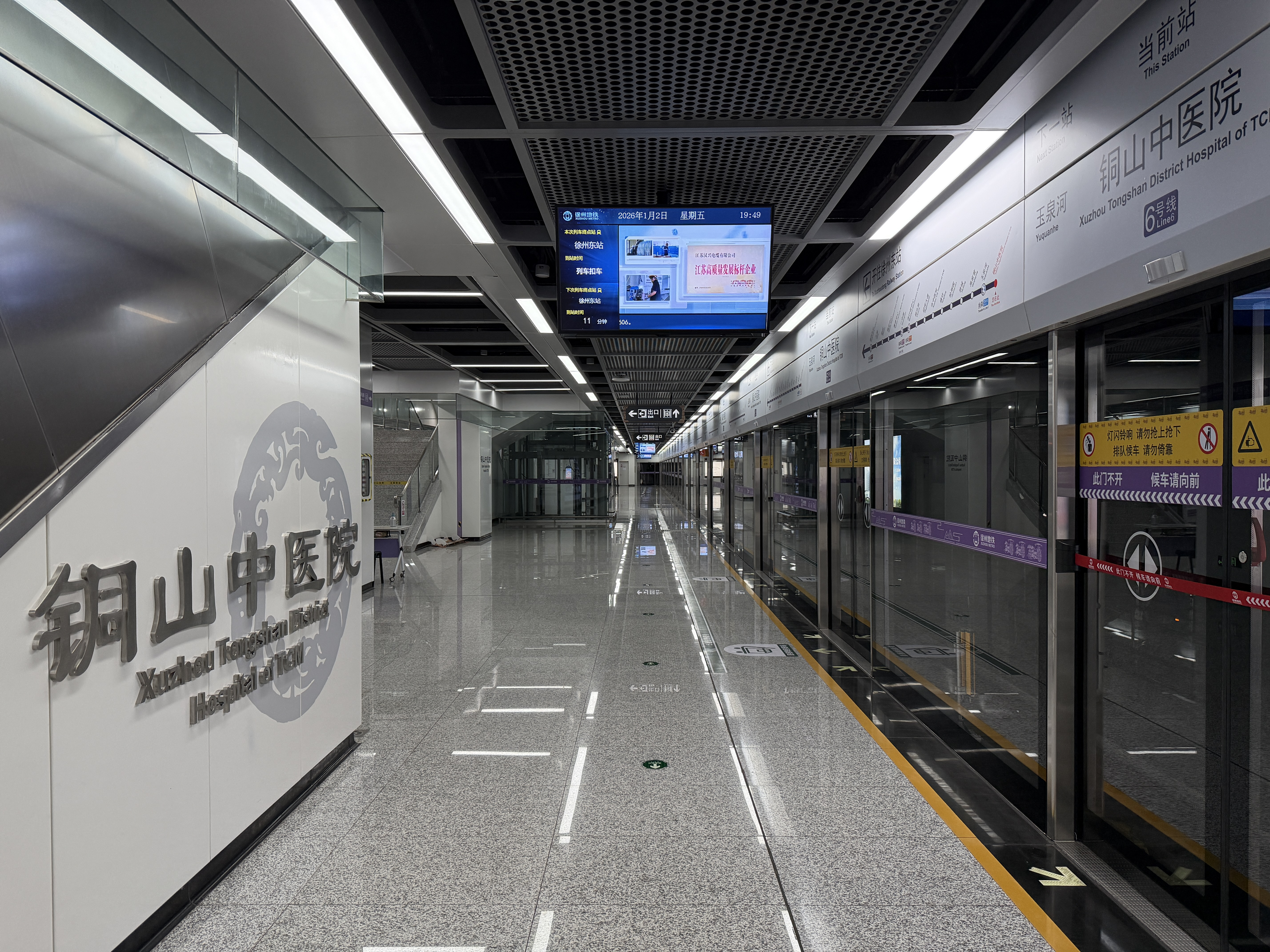
- Xuzhou Tongshan District Hospital of TCM station platform

Overview
- Status: Operational
- Owner: Xuzhou Metro
- Locale: Xuzhou, Jiangsu, China
- Termini: Xuzhou Tongshan District Hospital of TCM; Xuzhoudong Railway Station
- Stations: 16

Service
- Type: Rapid transit
- System: Xuzhou Metro
- Operator(s): Xuzhou Metro
- Depot(s): Wangzhuang Depot, Gaotie Parking Lot (高铁停车场)
- Rolling stock: CRRC Nanjing Puzhen 4 cars type B

History
- Opened: 28 September 2025; 8 months ago

Technical
- Line length: 22.9 km (14.2 mi)
- Number of tracks: 2
- Track gauge: 1,435 mm (4 ft 8 1/2 in)
- Electrification: 1,500 V DC Overhead catenary
- Operating speed: 80 km/h (50 mph) (Maximum design speed)

Line 6 of the Xuzhou Metro (Chinese: 徐州地铁6号线) is a rapid transit line in Xuzhou, Jiangsu, China. The first phase opened on 28 September 2025 with 16 stations, spanning 22.9 km long. Line 6 is the first fully automated metro line using GoA4 automation level in Xuzhou.

== History ==
On 28 November 2020, the groundbreaking ceremony of the second phase of Line 3 and the first phase of Line 6 were held at Municipal Administrative Center station.

On 27 May 2025, Line 6 passed the acceptance of the civil engineering of the depot for entry and exit lines in the first phase of the project.

On 5 June 2025, Line 6 started trial operation in 3 months with no passengers and passed the acceptance on 10 September 2025.

On 20 September 2025, Line 6 opened a three-day trial ride activity for the public.

On 28 September 2025, the first phase of Line 6 officially put into operation.

== Stations ==
All 16 stations are underground.

The line operates from 6:00 to 22:30. The peak interval on weekdays is about 6 minutes and 34 seconds, the peak interval is about 8 minutes and 52 seconds, the peak interval on weekends is about 8 minutes and 05 seconds, the interval between flat peak trains is about 9 minutes and 53 seconds, and the one-way running time of trains is about 39 minutes and 18 seconds.

Station name		Transfer	Distance km	Location
English	Chinese	Transfer	Distance km	Location
Xuzhou Tongshan District Hospital of TCM	铜山中医院			Tongshan District
Yuquanhe	玉泉河	3		Tongshan District
Gaojiaying	高家营			Tongshan District
Yicheng	驿城			Tongshan District
Jianceyuan	检测园			Yunlong District
Tangfang	塘坊			Yunlong District
Xuzhou City Hospital of TCM	市中医院			Yunlong District
Yingbindadao	迎宾大道			Yunlong District
Lishuilu	丽水路			Yunlong District
Municipal Administrative Center	市行政中心	2		Yunlong District
Yizhongnan	一中南			Yunlong District
Xuzhou Olympic Sports Center	奥体中心			Yunlong District
Huaihai International Expo Center	博览中心			Yunlong District
Zhaowu	赵武			Yunlong District
Dahu	大湖			Jiawang District
Xuzhoudong Railway Station	徐州东站	1		Jiawang District
