= Line 2 (Xuzhou Metro) =

Metro line in Xuzhou, China

- 2
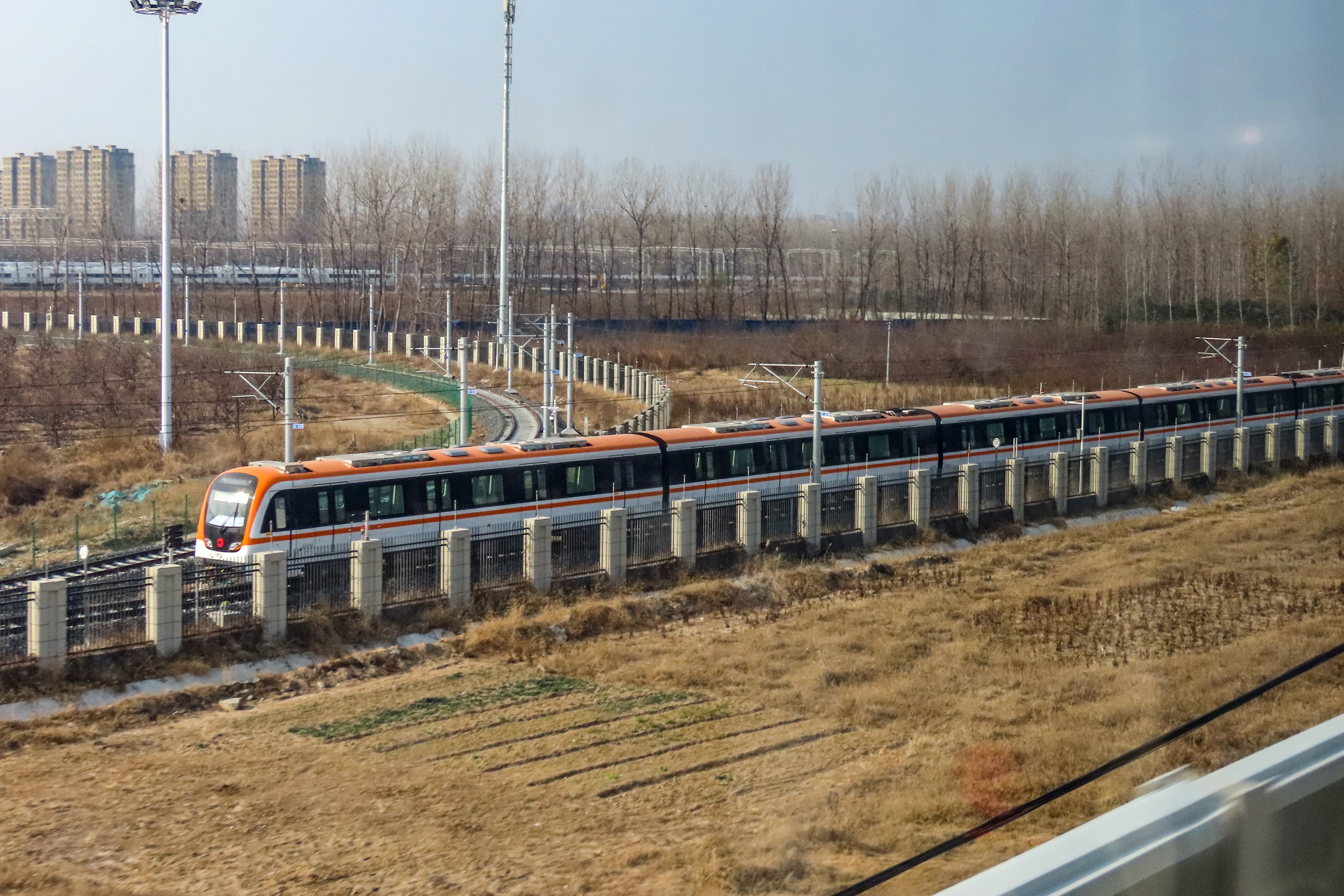
- Line 2 train at depot

Overview
- Native name: 徐州地铁2号线
- Status: Operational
- Locale: Xuzhou, Jiangsu
- Termini: Keyunbei; Xinchengqudong
- Stations: 20

Service
- Type: Rapid transit
- System: Xuzhou Metro
- Rolling stock: Type B (CRRC Nanjing Puzhen)

History
- Commenced: 2016
- Opened: November 28, 2020; 4 years ago

Technical
- Line length: 24.363 km (15.138 mi)
- Number of tracks: 2
- Character: Underground
- Operating speed: 80 km/h (50 mph)

Line 2 of the Xuzhou Metro (Chinese: 徐州地铁2号线; pinyin: Xúzhōu dìtiě èr hào xiàn) is a rapid transit line in Xuzhou city, Jiangsu province, China. Construction commenced in February 2016, and the line was opened on November 28, 2020. It is the second metro line to open in Xuzhou.

Line 2 runs primarily north–south through Xuzhou's CBD and Xuzhou New District, from North Coach Station in the north to Xinchengqu East in the south.

== Line overview ==
Phase 1 stations (from north to south)
| Station Name | | Platform Type | Connections | Location |
| English | Chinese | Platform Type | Connections | Location |
|---|---|---|---|---|
| Keyunbei | 客运北站 | Underground, island | | Gulou |
| Liwo | 李沃 | Underground, island | | Gulou |
| Jiulishan | 九里山 | Underground, island | | Gulou |
| Bentengdadao | 奔腾大道 | Underground, island | 7 | Gulou |
| Jiulonghu | 九龙湖 | Underground, island | | Gulou |
| Qingyunqiao | 庆云桥 | Underground, island | | Gulou |
| Pengchengguangchang | 彭城广场 | Underground, island | 1 | Gulou / Yunlong |
| Hubushan | 户部山 | Underground, island | | Yunlong |
| Jiangsu Normal University Yunlong Campus | 师大云龙校区 | Underground, island | 5 | Yunlong |
| Xuzhou Central Hospital | 中心医院 | Underground, island | | Quanshan |
| Huaita | 淮塔 | Underground, island | 3 | Quanshan |
| Kejicheng | 科技城 | Underground, island | | Quanshan |
| Qiligou | 七里沟 | Underground, island | 4 | Quanshan |
| Baiguoyuan | 百果园 | Underground, island | | Quanshan |
| Tuolongshan | 拖龙山 | Underground, island | | Yunlong |
| Dalonghu | 大龙湖 | Underground, island | | Yunlong |
| Municipal Administrative Center | 市行政中心 | Underground, island | 6 | Yunlong |
| Hanyuandadao | 汉源大道 | Underground, island | | Yunlong |
| Xinyuandadao | 新元大道 | Underground, island | 5 | Yunlong |
| Xinchengqudong | 新城区东 | Underground, island | S2 | Jiawang |

== History ==
Xuzhou Metro Line 2 officially began construction on February 22, 2016. As of September 2018, about half of the stations have begun main structure construction, while the other half have been capped successfully. Tunneling has begun on most stations, with eight stations having tunneled through for both tracks on the line.

Civil engineering work on Line 2 is expected to complete in May 2019, with railway work completing in October 2019. Installation of electromechanical equipment will complete in March 2020, railway adjustment work will complete in June 2020, rolling stock will be tested on the line from July 1 to September 30, 2020, and the line opened to traffic in November 2020.

As of 2018, the second phase has not begun construction; it will include six elevated stations to the south of Xinchengqu East Station.
