= Line 3 (Xuzhou Metro) =

Metro line in Xuzhou, China

- 3
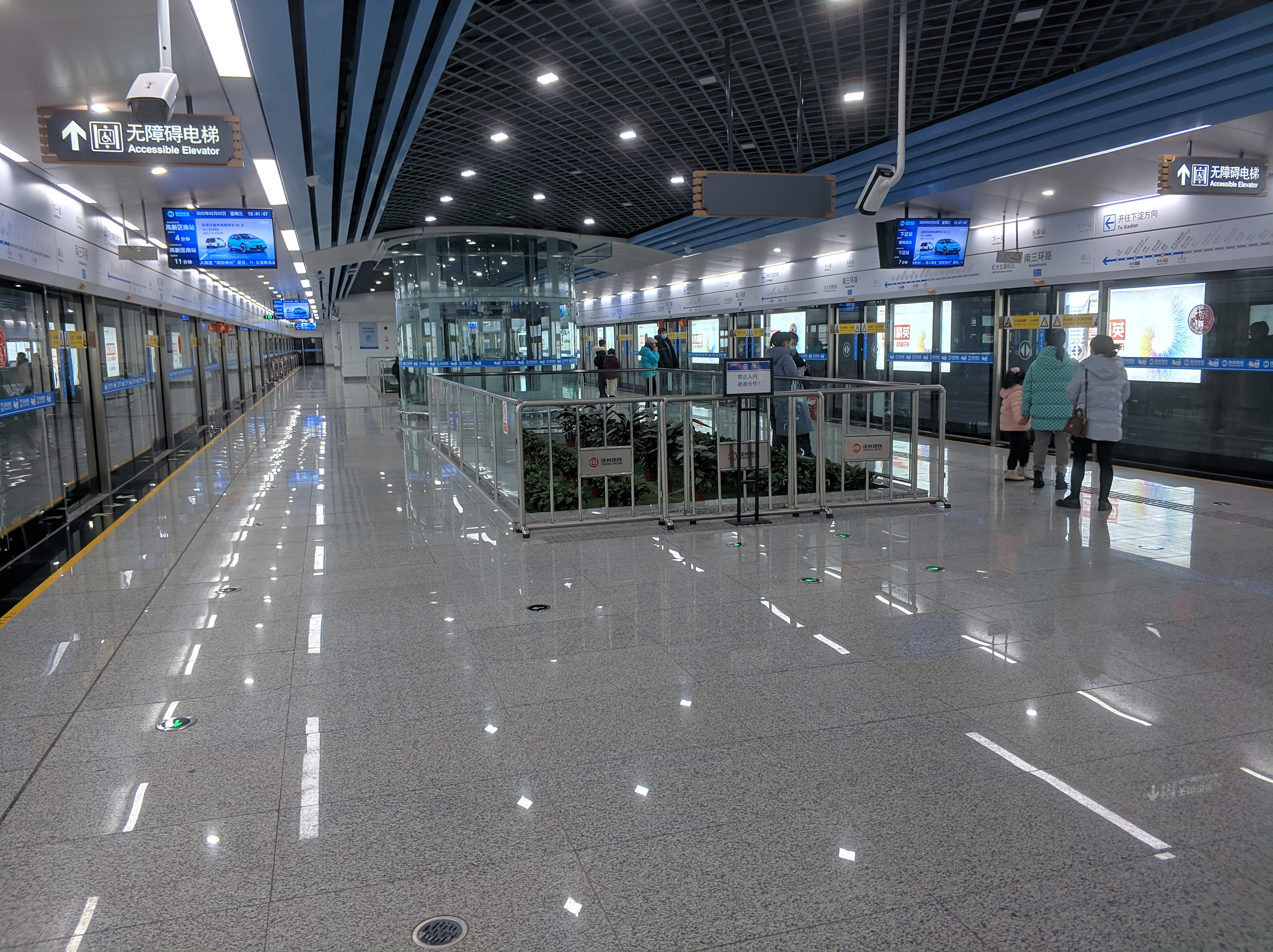
- Nansanhuanlu station

Overview
- Native name: 徐州地铁3号线
- Status: Operational
- Locale: Xuzhou, Jiangsu
- Termini: Zhenxingdadao; Yinshan
- Stations: 22

Service
- Type: Rapid transit
- System: Xuzhou Metro
- Rolling stock: Type B (CRRC Nanjing Puzhen)

History
- Opened: June 28, 2021; 4 years ago

Technical
- Line length: 26.26 km (16.32 mi)
- Number of tracks: 2
- Character: Underground and Elevated
- Operating speed: 80 km/h (50 mph)

Line 3 of the Xuzhou Metro (Chinese: 徐州地铁3号线) is a rapid transit line in Xuzhou city, Jiangsu province, China. It is the third metro line to open in Xuzhou.

== History ==
=== Phase 1 ===
Phase 1 of Line 3 was opened on June 28, 2021. It is 18.13 km in length and fully underground.

=== Phase 2 ===
Phase 2 of Line 3 opened on 3 December 2024. It added 6 stations (5 stations in the Northern extension and 1 station in the Southern extension) and a total of 8.13 km in length (1.57 km South extension and 6.56 km North extension). The South extension is elevated and the North extension is underground.

== Stations ==
Station name		Connections	Distance km		Location
English	Chinese	Connections	Distance km		Location
Zhenxingdadao	振兴大道		0	0	Gulou
Pantao	蟠桃				Gulou
Jiangsu Xuzhou Higher Vocational School of Economics & Trading	经贸学校	4			Gulou
Jinshanqiao	金山桥				Gulou
Yangzhuang	杨庄				Gulou
Xiadian	下淀				Gulou
Baiyunshan	白云山				Gulou
Xuzhou Railway Station	徐州火车站	1 XCH			Gulou / Yunlong
Tianqiao	天桥				Yunlong
Hepingdaqiao	和平大桥				Yunlong
Huaita	淮塔	2			Quanshan
CUMT Wenchang Campus	矿大文昌校区				Quanshan
Nansanhuanlu	南三环路	4			Quanshan
Zhaishan	翟山				Quanshan
Jiangsu Normal University	师范大学				Tongshan
Yuquanhe	玉泉河	6			Tongshan
Wumingshan Park	无名山公园				Tongshan
Pujianglu	浦江路				Tongshan
Jiaoshan	焦山				Tongshan
Qianjianglu	钱江路				Tongshan
Gaoxinqu'nan	高新区南				Tongshan
Yinshan	银山				Tongshan
