= Xuzhou railway station =

Railway station in Jiangsu Province, China

Xuzhou 徐州
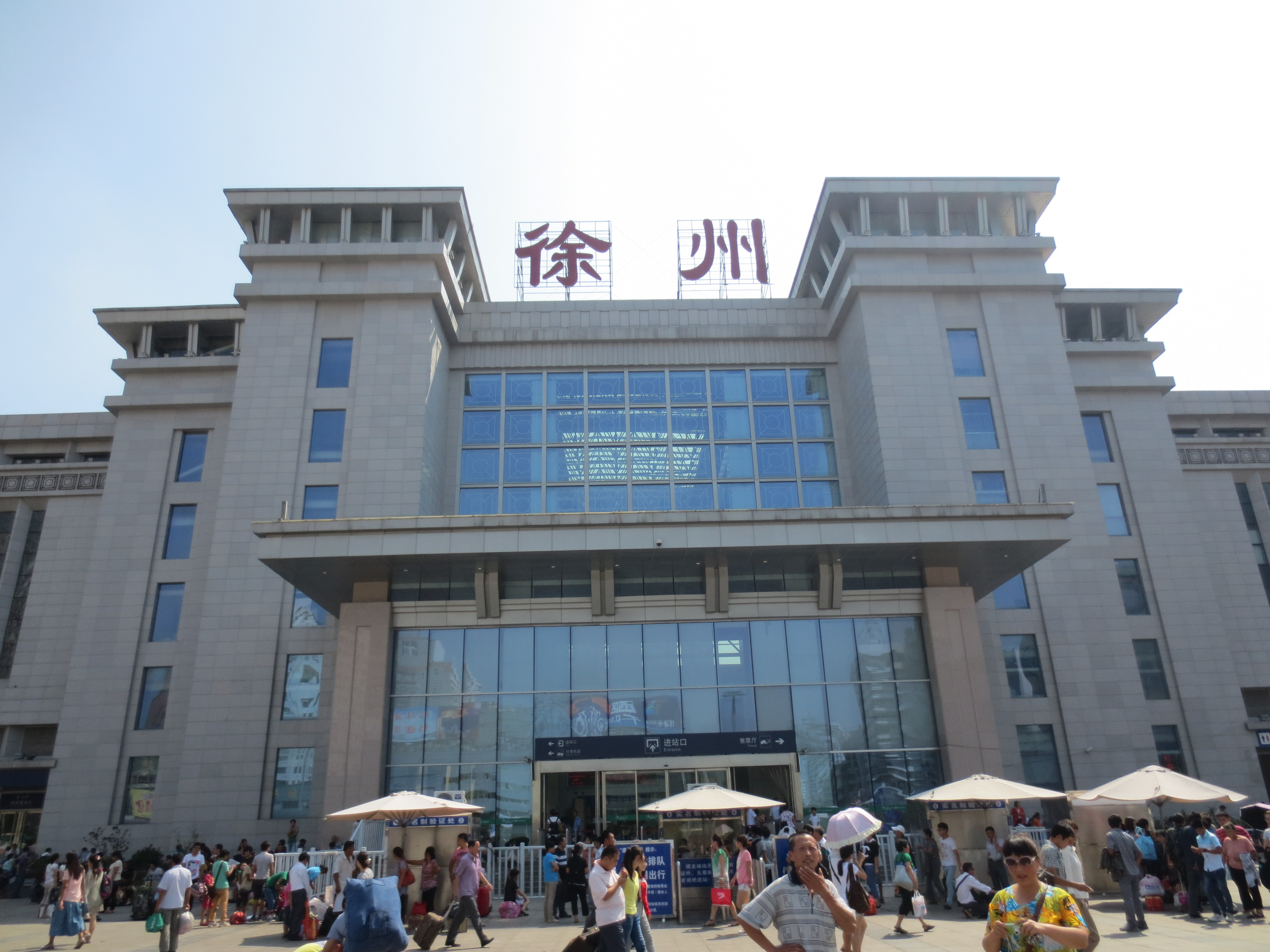
- Xuzhou railway station

General information
- Location: 202 Jinpu West Road; Yunlong District, Xuzhou, Jiangsu; China
- Coordinates: 34°16′2″N 117°12′2″E
- Operator: CR Shanghai
- Lines: Beijing–Shanghai railway; Longhai Railway
- Platforms: 9 (1 side platform and 4 island platforms)
- Tracks: 9
- Connections: Bus terminal; Xuzhou Metro: 1 3

Other information
- Station code: 16628 (TMIS code); XCH (telegraph code); XZH (Pinyin code)
- Classification: Top Class station (特等站)

History
- Opened: 1910
- Former names: Xuzhoufu (Chinese: 徐州府); Tongshan (Chinese: 铜山)

Services
Preceding station	China Railway	Following station
Zaozhuang West towards Beijing	Beijing–Shanghai railway	Suzhou towards Shanghai
Pizhou towards Lianyungang East	Longhai railway	Huangkou towards Lanzhou
Location
- Location within Jiangsu Location within China

Xuzhou railway station (Chinese: 徐州站; pinyin: Xúzhōu zhàn) is a railway station at the intersection of the north–south Beijing–Shanghai railway and the east–west Longhai Railway. The station is located in Yunlong District, Xuzhou, Jiangsu, China.

== History ==
The station was opened in 1910 as Xuzhoufu railway station (Chinese: 徐州府站) on Tianjin–Pukou railway (Chinese: 津浦铁路, now part of Beijing–Shanghai railway). In 1915, the station was connected with Longhai railway.

In 1927, the station was renamed as Xuzhou railway station and was later renamed as Tongshan railway station (Chinese: 铜山站) in 1936. The station was destroyed in the Battle of Xuzhou in 1938 and the Japanese invaders took control of the station after the battle and reconditioned it.

The name of the station was changed back to Xuzhou railway station after the war against Japan. The station was again destroyed in Huaihai Campaign in 1948, and was reconditioned after the Communists took over Xuzhou in December 1948.

After the war, the station have been expanded and renovated several times. The latest renovation, including new platform canopies and refurbishment of the facade of the station building, started in September 2008 and was finished in February 2010.

== Metro station ==
The station is served by Line 1 and Line 3 of the Xuzhou Metro.

== Gallery ==
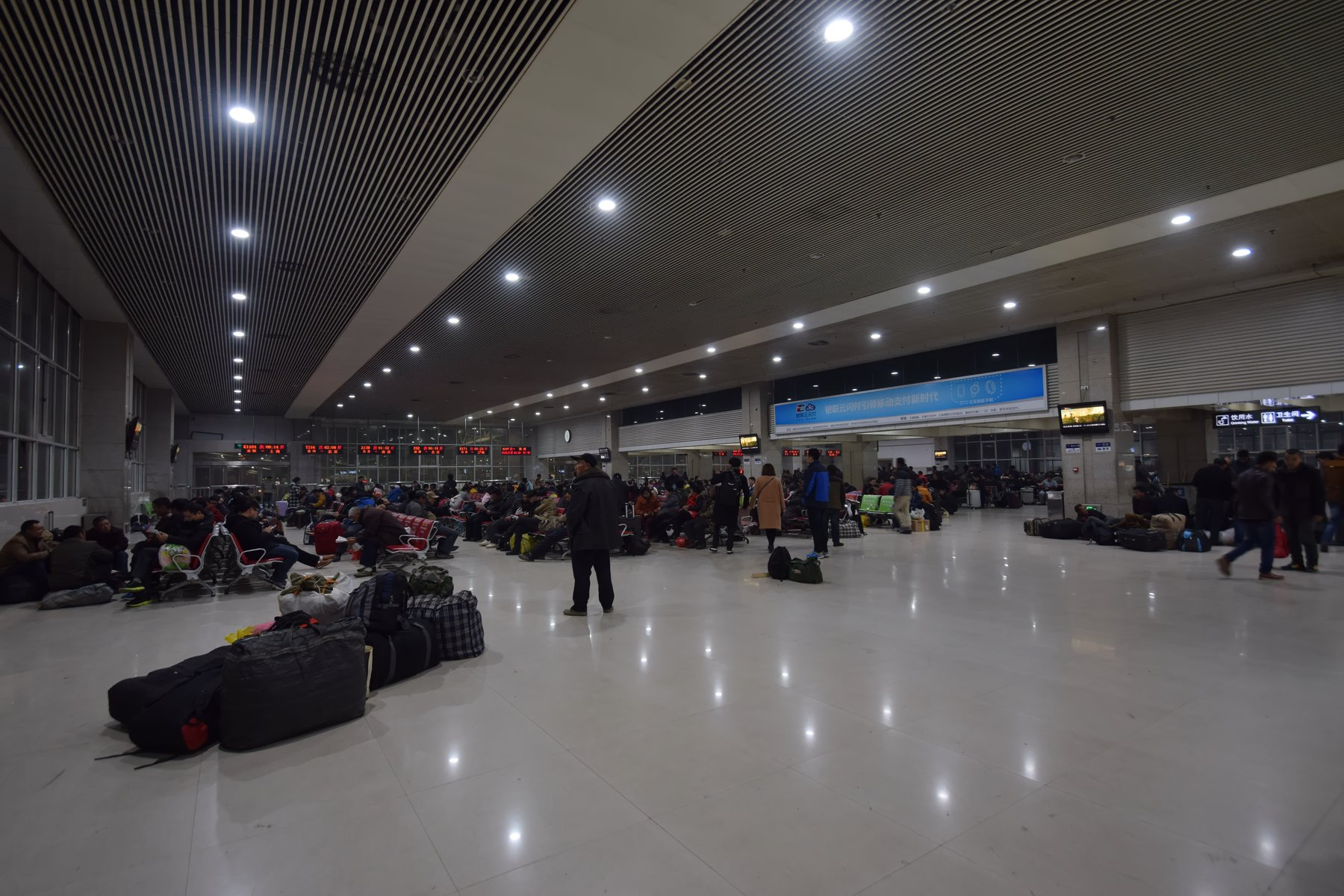
Waiting room 4

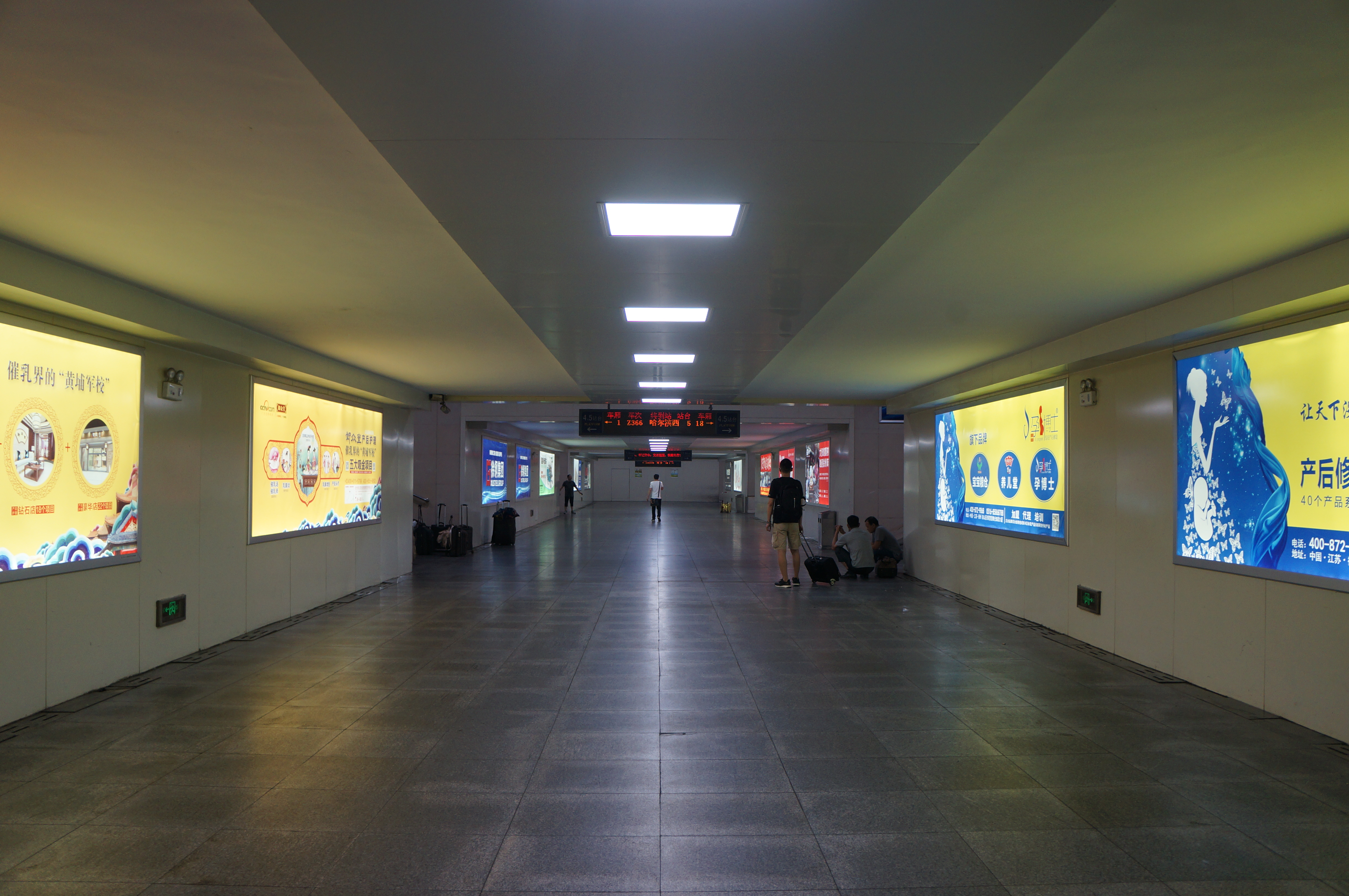
Exit tunnel of the station

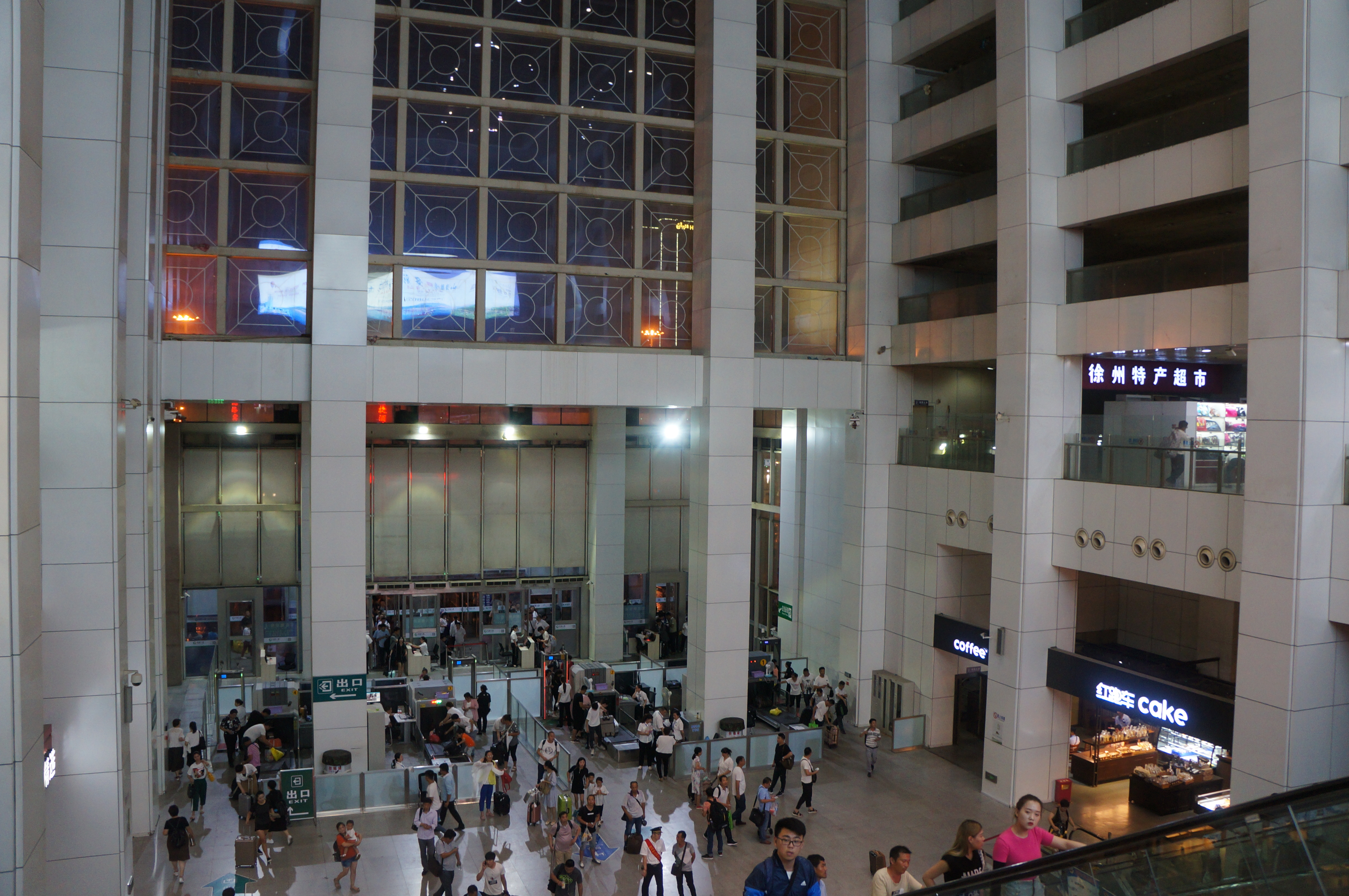
Entrance of the station
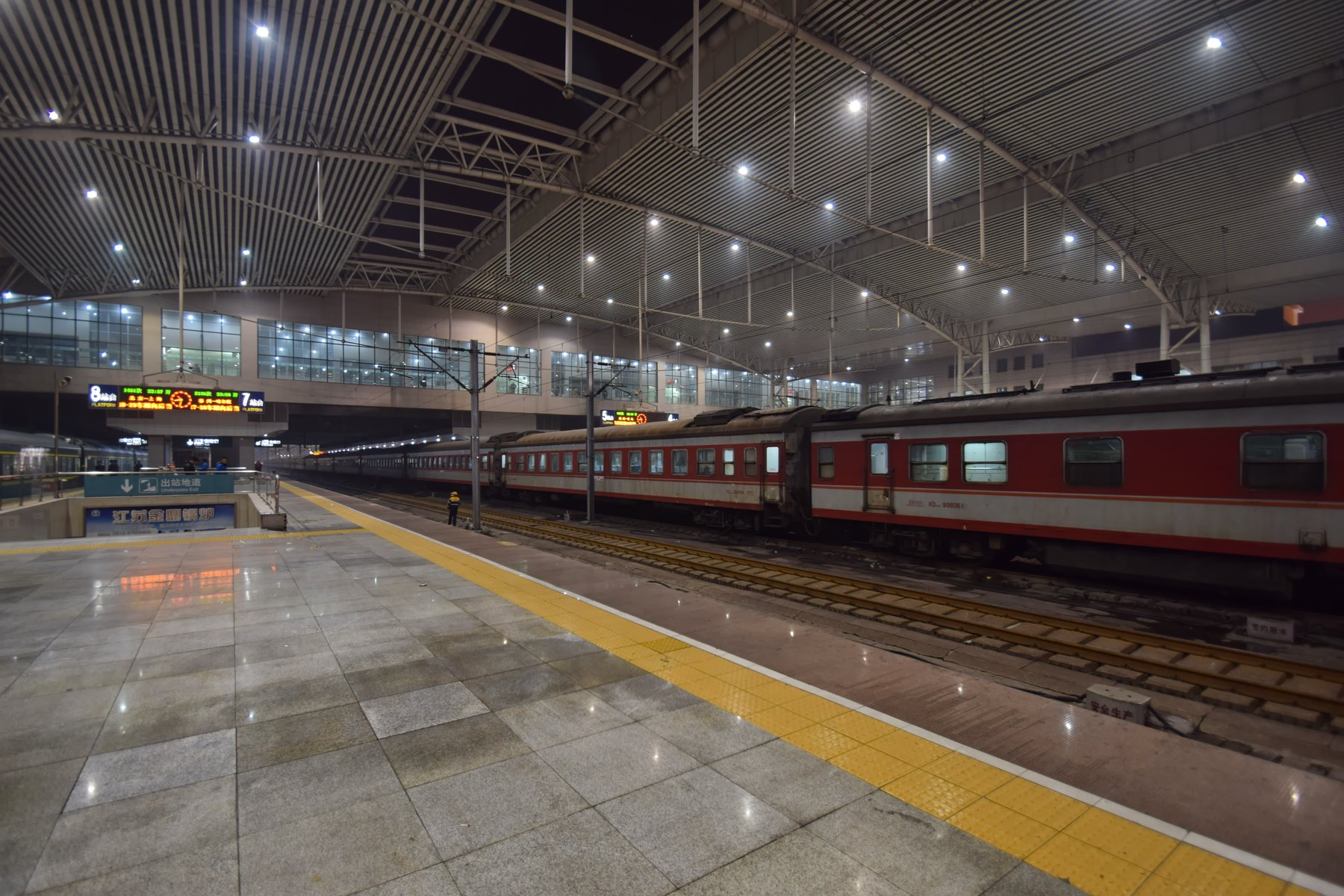
Platforms of the station

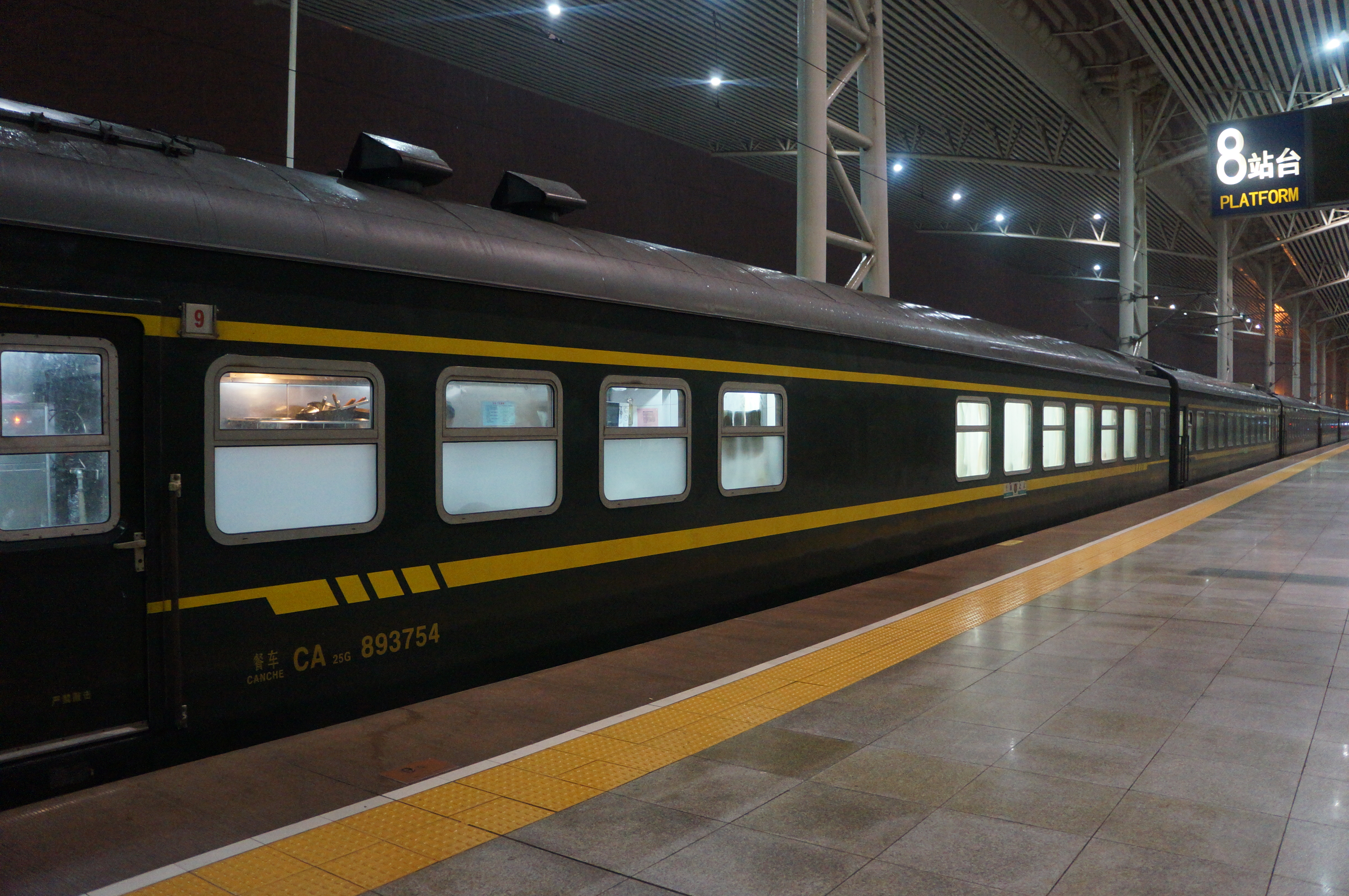
Train 1462 at the station

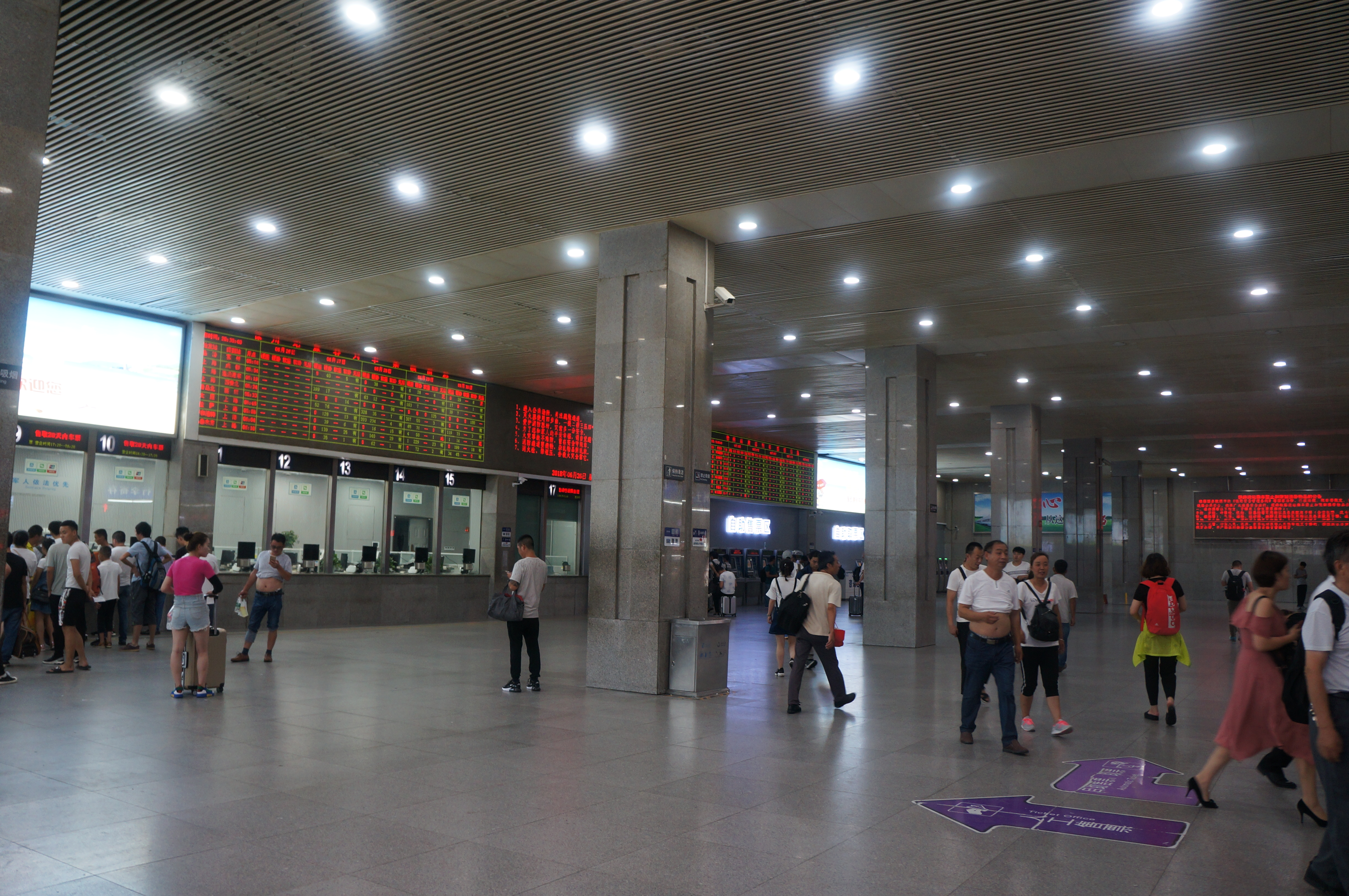
Ticket office
