= PJH =

PJH may refer to:

- Pirjhalar railway station (Indian Railways station code: PJH), a railway station in Madhya Pradesh, India
- Pizhou railway station (Telegraph code: PJH), a railway station in Xuzhou, Jiangsu, China
