= Cuipingshan Subdistrict =

Cuipingshan Subdistrict 翠屏山街道
- Subdistrict
- Location in Jiangsu
- Coordinates: 34°15′36″N 117°16′41″E
- Country: People's Republic of China
- Province: Jiangsu
- Prefecture-level city: Xuzhou
- District: Yunlong District
- Time zone: UTC+8 (China Standard)

Cuipingshan Subdistrict (Chinese: 翠屏山街道; pinyin: Cuìpíngshān Jiēdào) is a subdistrict in Yunlong District, Xuzhou, Jiangsu, China. As of 2020, it administers the following two residential communities and three villages:

- Dongjun Community (东郡社区)
- Shangdong Community (上东社区)
- Qiaojiahu Village (乔家湖村)
- Changshan Village (长山村)
- Tushansi Village (土山寺村)

== See also ==
- List of township-level divisions of Jiangsu
