= Xuzhou Metro =

Rapid transit system in Jiangsu Province, China

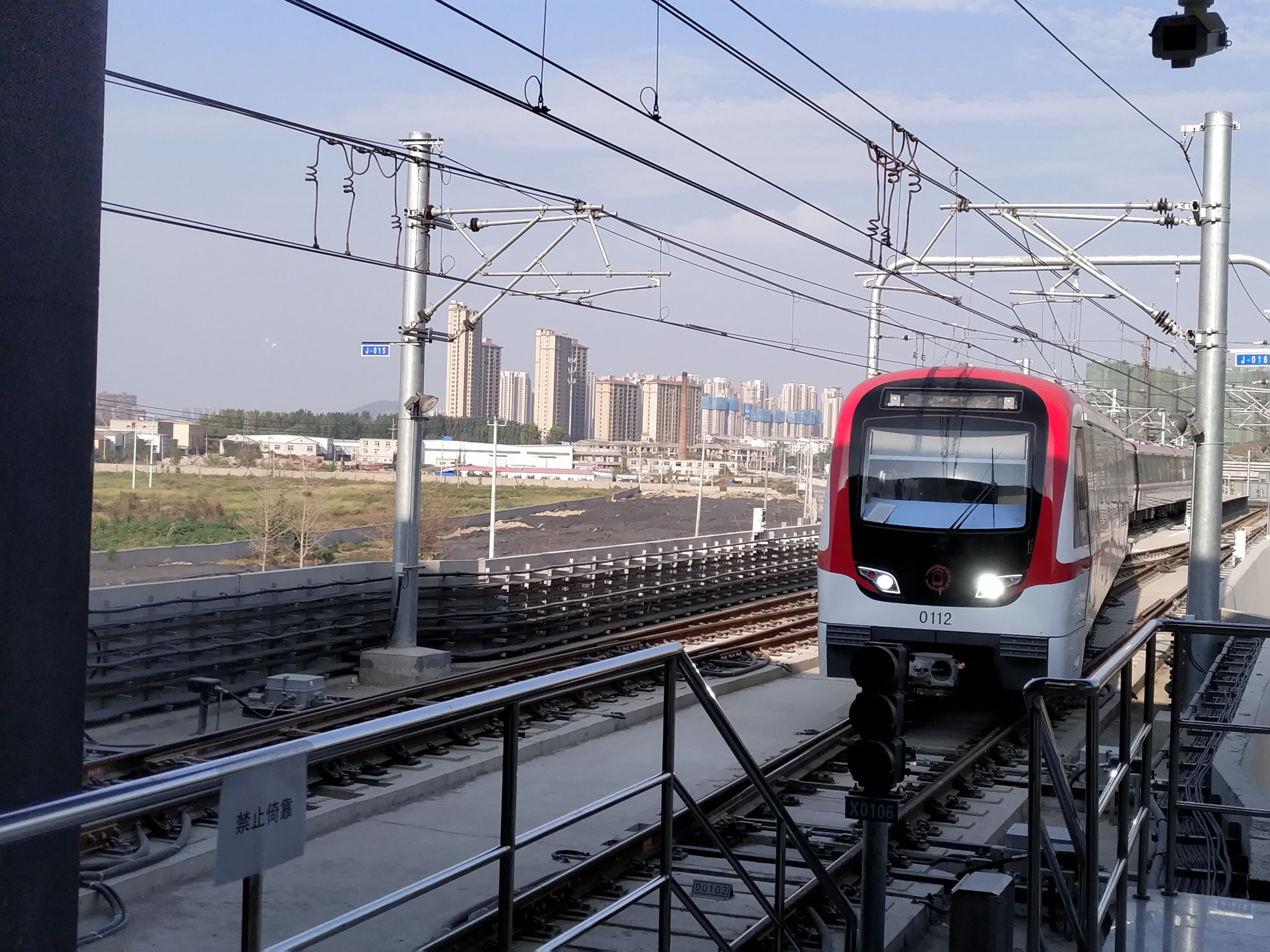

Overview
- Native name: 徐州地铁
- Owner: Xuzhou Metro Group
- Locale: Xuzhou, Jiangsu, China
- Transit type: Rapid transit
- Number of lines: 4 (another 2 lines under construction)
- Line number: 1 2 3 6
- Number of stations: 70
- Daily ridership: 829,100 (September 20, 2025 record)
- Annual ridership: 109.6 million (2024)
- Website: http://xzgdjt.com/

Operation
- Began operation: September 28, 2019; 7 years ago
- Operators: Xuzhou City Rail Transit Co., Ltd.
- Character: Underground, elevated

Technical
- System length: 95.44 km (59.30 mi)
- Track gauge: 1,435 mm (4 ft 8 1/2 in) standard gauge
- Electrification: 1.5 kV DC overhead lines
System map
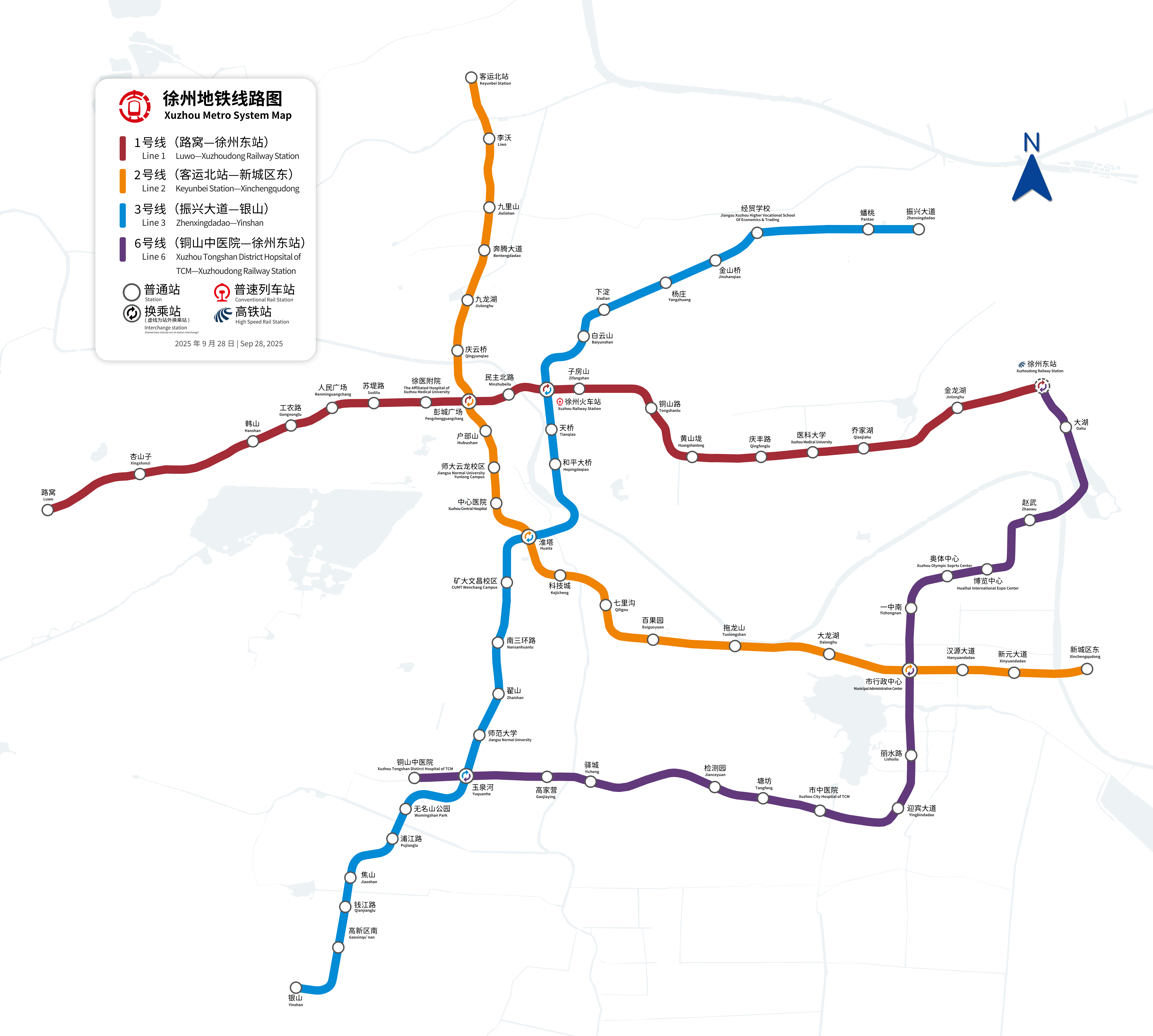

The Xuzhou Metro (Chinese: 徐州地铁; pinyin: Xúzhōu dìtiě) is a rapid transit system in Xuzhou, Jiangsu Province, China. Construction began in February 2014, and Line 1 was opened on September 28, 2019, Line 2 was opened on November 28, 2020, Line 3 was opened on June 28, 2021, and Line 6 was opened on September 28, 2025.

By 2020, the network is scheduled to comprise three lines with a total length of about 67 kilometres (42 mi). The total investment is expected to be 44.3 billion renminbi. The system is planned to comprise 11 lines and 323 kilometres (201 mi) of track when fully built out.

In its first year of operation the ridership was 7.5 million (2019).

== Lines in operation ==
Line	Terminals (District)		Commencement	Newest Extension	Length km	Stations
1	Luwo (Tongshan)	Xuzhoudong Railway Station (Jiawang)	September 28, 2019		21.97	18
2	Keyunbei Station (Tongshan)	Xinchengqudong (Jiawang)	November 28, 2020		24.25	20
3	Zhenxingdadao (Gulou)	Yinshan (Tongshan)	June 28, 2021	December 3, 2024	26.26	22
6	Xuzhou Tongshan District Hospital of TCM (Tongshan)	Xuzhoudong Railway Station (Jiawang)	September 28, 2025		22.91	16
Total					95.44	70

=== Line 1 ===
Line 1 began construction in February 2014. The first phase is 21.967 kilometres (13.6 mi) in length, and has 18 stations (17 underground and one elevated). It runs from Luwo in the west to Xuzhoudong Railway Station in the east. In June 2018, the civil engineering construction work was reported to be 95% complete, leaving mostly track laying, decorations, and electromechanical installations to be completed. On August 30, 2018, railway work was declared complete, and electromechanical installations and decorations was in progress.

Line 1 opened on September 28, 2019. it runs in an east–west direction, stretching from Luwo Station in Tongshan District in the west to Xuzhoudong Railway Station in Jiawang District in the east. The line traverses Quanshan District, Gulou District, and Yunlong District, serving as a vital corridor for east–west passenger traffic within Xuzhou City. It connects key areas in downtown Xuzhou, the Bashan Area, and Chengdong New District to commercial hubs like People's Square, Pengcheng Square, Huaihai Square, and Wanda Plaza, facilitating rapid access to Xuzhou Railway Station and Xuzhoudong Railway Station, the city's major transportation hubs.

As of November 2020, Line 1 spans a total length of 21.97 km (13.65 mi), with 0.571 km (0.355 mi) of the line being elevated, 20.996 km (13.046 mi) underground, and 0.4 km (0.25 mi) at-grade. The line comprises a total of 18 stations, including one elevated station and 17 underground stations. Line 1 operates with six-section B-type trains. By November 2020, the average daily ridership on Line 1 stood at 56,500, with a single-day ridership peak of 150,000 recorded on October 2, 2019. In 2020, the annual ridership on Line 1 reached 19 million passengers.

=== Line 2 ===
Line 2, opened on November 28, 2020, spans a length of 24.25 kilometers (15.07 mi) and features 20 underground stations. This line operates entirely underground and represents the second metro line to open in Xuzhou city. Serving as a pivotal north–south to east–west backbone, Xuzhou Metro Line 2 traverses the old city and Xuzhou New District, encompassing the north and southeast passenger traffic zones of the city. It facilitates connectivity between the Jiulishan area, the old city, and the new city.

=== Line 3 ===
Line 3 commenced operations on June 28, 2021, with an initial phase spanning 18.13 kilometers (11.27 mi) and featuring 16 underground stations, including two transfer stations. This line operates between Xiadian and Gaoxinqunan, linking the North Zone, Central Zone, and South Zone of Xuzhou city.

Line 3 is colored "Technological Blue", selected in a poll.

== Lines under construction ==
Line	Terminals		Commencement	Length km	Stations
4	Tuolanshanlu	Qiaoshangcun	Under construction	29.4	19
5	Olympic Sports Center South	Xukuangcheng	Construction postponed	24.6	20

== Future development ==
=== Second phase ===
Construction is planned begin on the second phase of the Xuzhou Metro, including Line 4, Line 5, Line 6, and the second phase of Line 3. Construction is expected to be completed in 2024. The second phase will add 79.3 kilometres (49.3 mi) to the system.

Line 4 is planned to be 25.4 kilometres (15.8 mi) long with 19 underground stations. It will run between Tuolanshan and Qiaoshangcun.

Line 5 is planned to be 24.6 kilometres (15.3 mi) long with 20 underground stations. It will run between Olympic Sports Center South and Xukuangcheng.

Line 6 is planned to be 22.9 kilometres (14.2 mi) long with 15 underground stations. It will run between Huangshanlu and Xuzhoudong Railway Station.

These lines was approved by the National Development and Reform Commission on January 20, 2020.

=== Third phase ===
The third phase of metro lines, currently in the planning stage, will finalize the plans for the Xuzhou Metro, consisting of 7 urban metro lines and 4 suburban lines. This phase will encompass the extension of Line 1 and Line 2 into their second phases, the full development of Line 7, and the incorporation of suburban lines S1, S2, S3, and S4 into the expanding metro network of Xuzhou.
