= Pipa Subdistrict =

Pipa Subdistrict 琵琶街道
- Subdistrict
- Location in Jiangsu
- Coordinates: 34°18′0″N 117°12′5″E
- Country: People's Republic of China
- Province: Jiangsu
- Prefecture-level city: Xuzhou
- District: Gulou District
- Time zone: UTC+8 (China Standard)

Pipa Subdistrict (Chinese: 琵琶街道; pinyin: Pípá Jiēdào) is a subdistrict in Gulou District, Xuzhou, Jiangsu province, China. As of 2020, it has 11 residential neighborhoods under its administration:

- Pipa Community
- Wanzhai Community (万寨社区)
- Taizi Community (台子社区)
- Liwo Community (李沃社区)
- Bali Community (八里社区)
- Yinzhuang Community (殷庄社区)
- Binhe Community (滨河社区)
- Qingshuiwan Community (清水湾社区)
- Pipahuayuan Community (琵琶花园社区)
- Yiju Community (宜居社区)
- Zehuijiayuan Community (泽惠嘉园社区)

== See also ==
- List of township-level divisions of Jiangsu
