= Pizhou railway station =

Railway station in Pizhou, Jiangsu, China

Pizhou 邳州

General information
- Location: 1 Jiefang Road; Pizhou, Xuzhou, Jiangsu; China
- Coordinates: 34.3184°N 117.9530°E
- Operator: CR Shanghai
- Line: Longhai railway
- Platforms: 3 (1 side platform and 1 island platform)
- Tracks: 12
- Connections: Bus terminal

Other information
- Station code: 38579 (TMIS code); PJH (telegraph code); PZH (Pinyin code)
- Classification: Class 2 station (二等站)

History
- Opened: 1923
- Former names: Yunhe (Chinese: 运河); Pixian (Chinese: 邳县)

Services
| Preceding station | China Railway | Following station |
|---|---|---|
| Pizhou East towards Lianyungang East | Longhai railway | Xuzhou towards Lanzhou |
Location
- Location within Jiangsu Location within China

Pizhou railway station (Chinese: 邳州站) is a station on Longhai railway in Pizhou, Xuzhou, Jiangsu.

== History ==
The station was established in 1923. Since Longhai railway crossed over the Grand Canal here, it was named as Yunhe railway station (Chinese: 运河站, literally Canal railway station) initially.

The station was renamed as Pixian railway station (Chinese: 邳县站, literally Pi County railway station) in 1954. In 1992, Pi County was promoted to Pizhou City, but the station name remained unchanged until 2005.

The station has been closed in 2022.
