= Xuzhou East railway station =

Railway station in Xuzhou, China

Xuzhoudong 徐州东
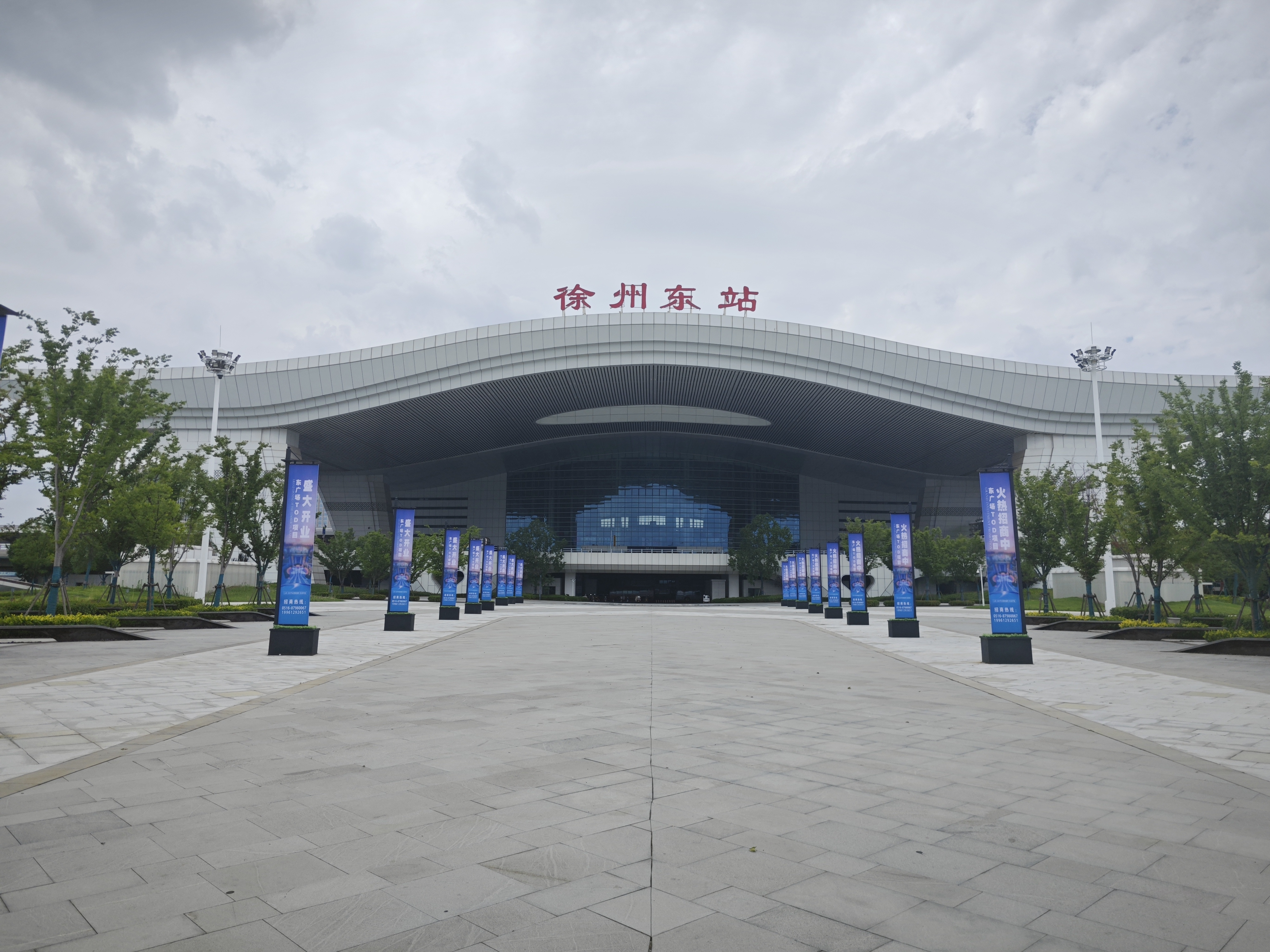

General information
- Other names: Xuzhou East
- Location: Dongjiao Economic Development Zone, Jiawang District, Xuzhou, Jiangsu; China
- Coordinates: 34.267609°N 117.296594°E
- Operated by: Shanghai Railway Bureau; China Railway Corporation
- Line(s): Beijing–Shanghai High-Speed Railway; Xuzhou–Lanzhou High-Speed Railway; Lianyungang–Xuzhou high-speed railway
- Connections: Xuzhou bus Xuzhou Metro (from 2019)

Other information
- Station code: 66827 (TMIS code)

History
- Opened: June 30, 2011

Passengers
- 2011: 13.27 million/year

Xuzhou East railway station (Chinese: 徐州东站; pinyin: Xúzhōu dōng zhàn; or Xuzhoudong railway station) is a station dedicated for high-speed railways in Xuzhou, Jiangsu, People's Republic of China. It is served by the Beijing–Shanghai high-speed railway and Xuzhou-Lanzhou high-speed railway (Eurasia Continental Bridge passageway).

The new station for high-speed rail services was officially put into use on June 30, 2011. It is located at the approximate halfway point between Beijing and Shanghai on the Beijing-Shanghai railway.

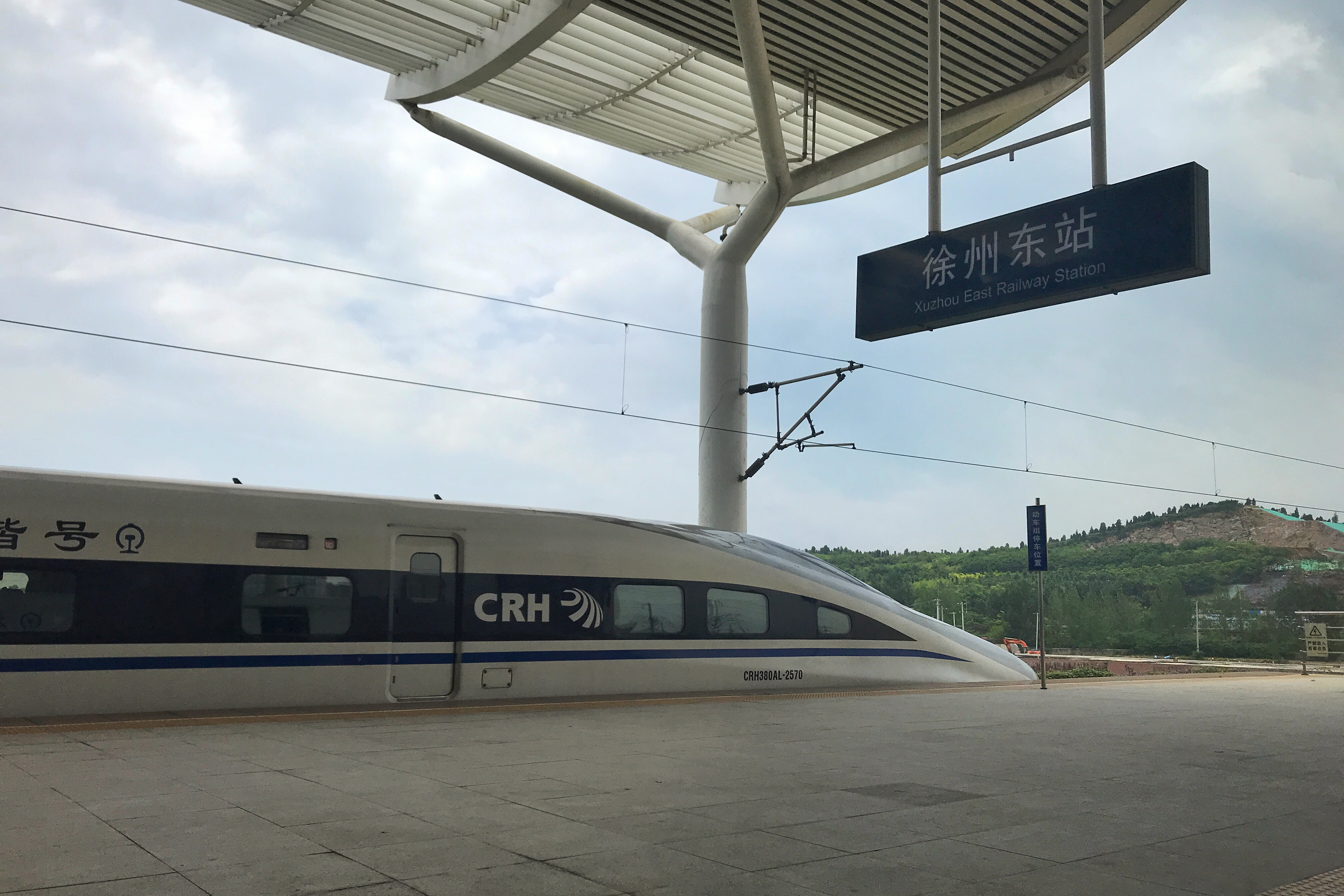
Platform of Xuzhou East Railway Station

== History ==
On April 18, 2008, Xuzhou East Station officially began construction. After CRH380A rolling stock tests in December 2010, it opened for high-speed rail traffic on June 30, 2011.

=== Expansion ===
An expansion project for the station was announced by the Xuzhou High-Speed Railway Investment Company in August 2017 to change the east square of the station into an "integrated passenger transportation hub". Groundbreaking on the project is expected to begin by the end of 2018.

The expanded station will include 13 island platforms and 28 tracks, serving roughly 80,000 passengers per day. Total investment in the project is around 1.5 billion renminbi. It was completed on December 16, 2019 with the opening of the Xuzhou-Yancheng high-speed railway.

== Metro station ==
The station has been served by Line 1 of the Xuzhou Metro since its opening on 28 September 2019.

Preceding station	China Railway High-speed	Following station
Zaozhuang towards Beijing South or Tianjin West	Beijing–Shanghai high-speed railway	Suzhou East towards Shanghai Hongqiao
Xiaoxian North towards Zhengzhou East	Zhengzhou–Xuzhou high-speed railway	Terminus
Terminus	Xuzhou–Yancheng high-speed railway	Guanyin Airport towards Yancheng
