= Quanshan, Xuzhou =

Quanshan 泉山区
- District
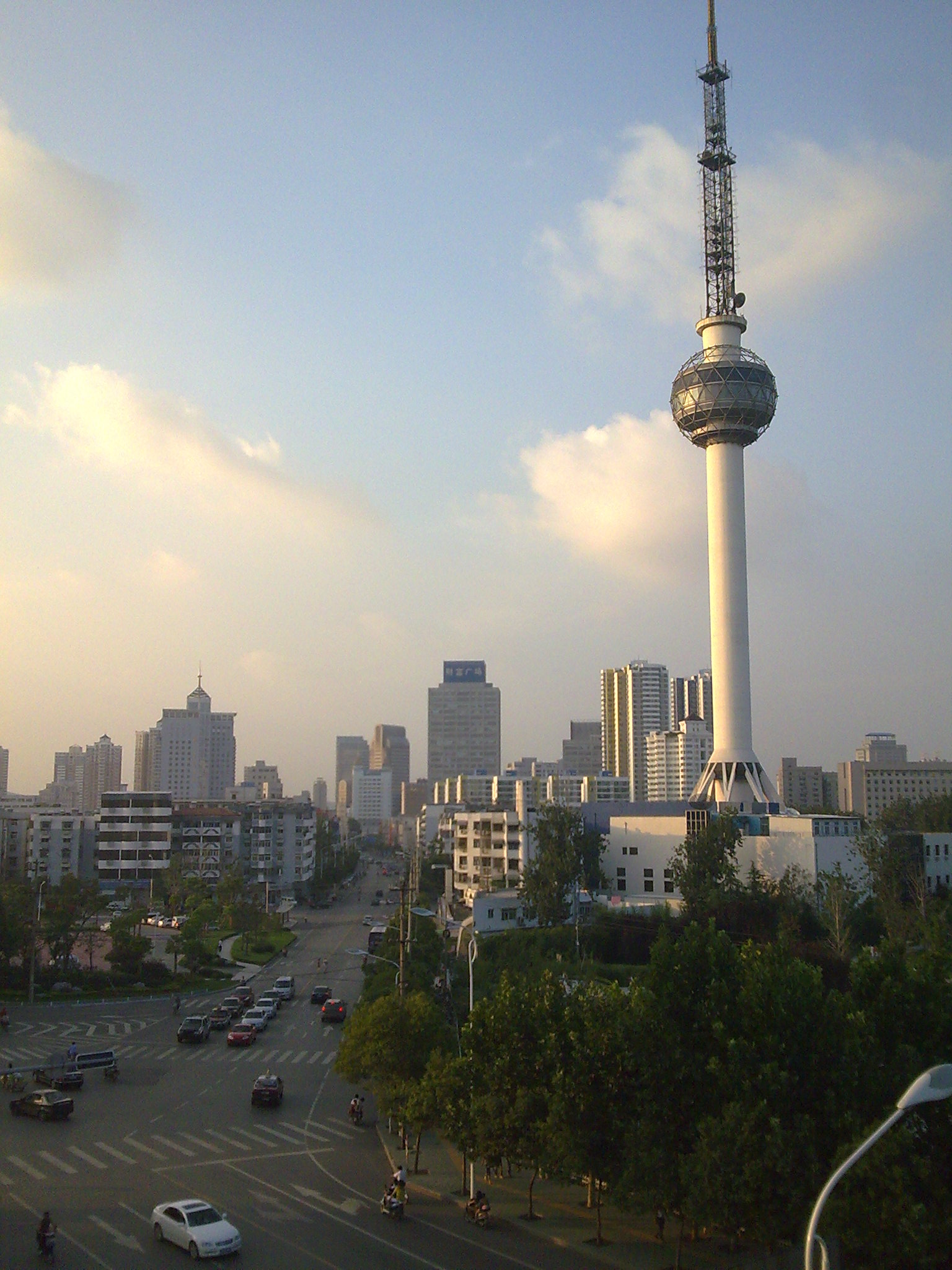
- Xuzhou TV Tower

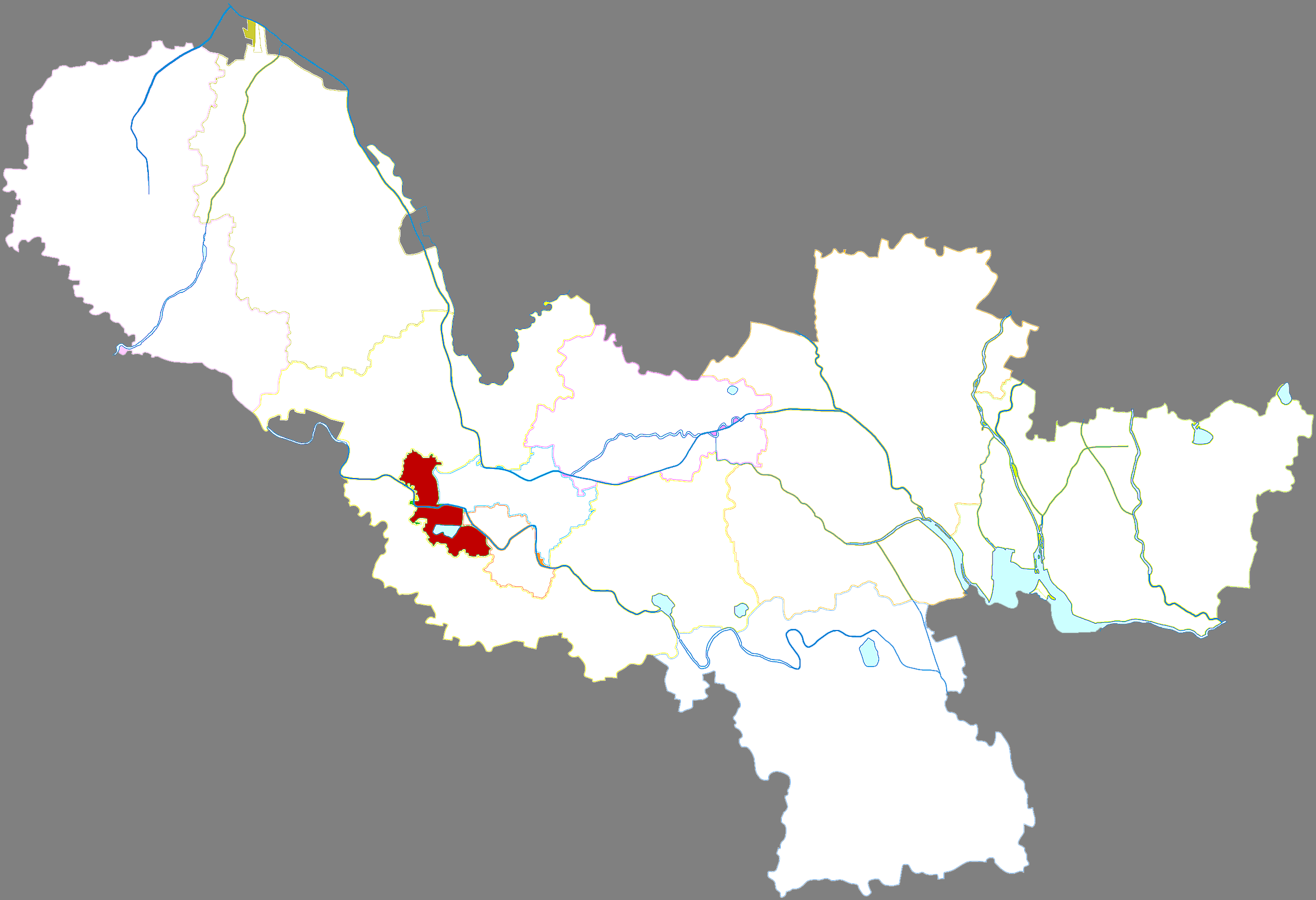
- Location in Xuzhou

- Xuzhou in Jiangsu
- Coordinates: 34°16′54″N 117°09′22″E
- Country: People's Republic of China
- Province: Jiangsu
- Prefecture-level city: Xuzhou

Area
  - Total: 100 km^{2} (39 sq mi)

Population (2018)
  - Total: 732,300
  - Density: 7,300/km^{2} (19,000/sq mi)
- Time zone: UTC+8 (China Standard)
- Postal Code: 221000

Quanshan District (simplified Chinese: 泉山区; traditional Chinese: 泉山區; pinyin: Quánshān Qū; lit. 'spring mountain') is one of six districts of Xuzhou, Jiangsu province, China.

== Administrative divisions ==
In the present, Quanshan District has 14 subdistricts.

14 subdistricts

- Wangling (王陵街道)
- Yong'an (永安街道)
- Hubin (湖滨街道)
- Duanzhuang (段庄街道)
- Zhaishan (翟山街道)
- Kuishan (奎山街道)
- Heping (和平街道)
- Taishan (泰山街道)
- Jinshan (金山街道)
- Qiligou (七里沟街道)
- Huohua (火花街道)
- Sushan (苏山街道)
- Taoyuan (桃园街道)
- Pangzhuang (庞庄街道)
