= Gulou, Xuzhou =

Gulou 鼓楼区
- District
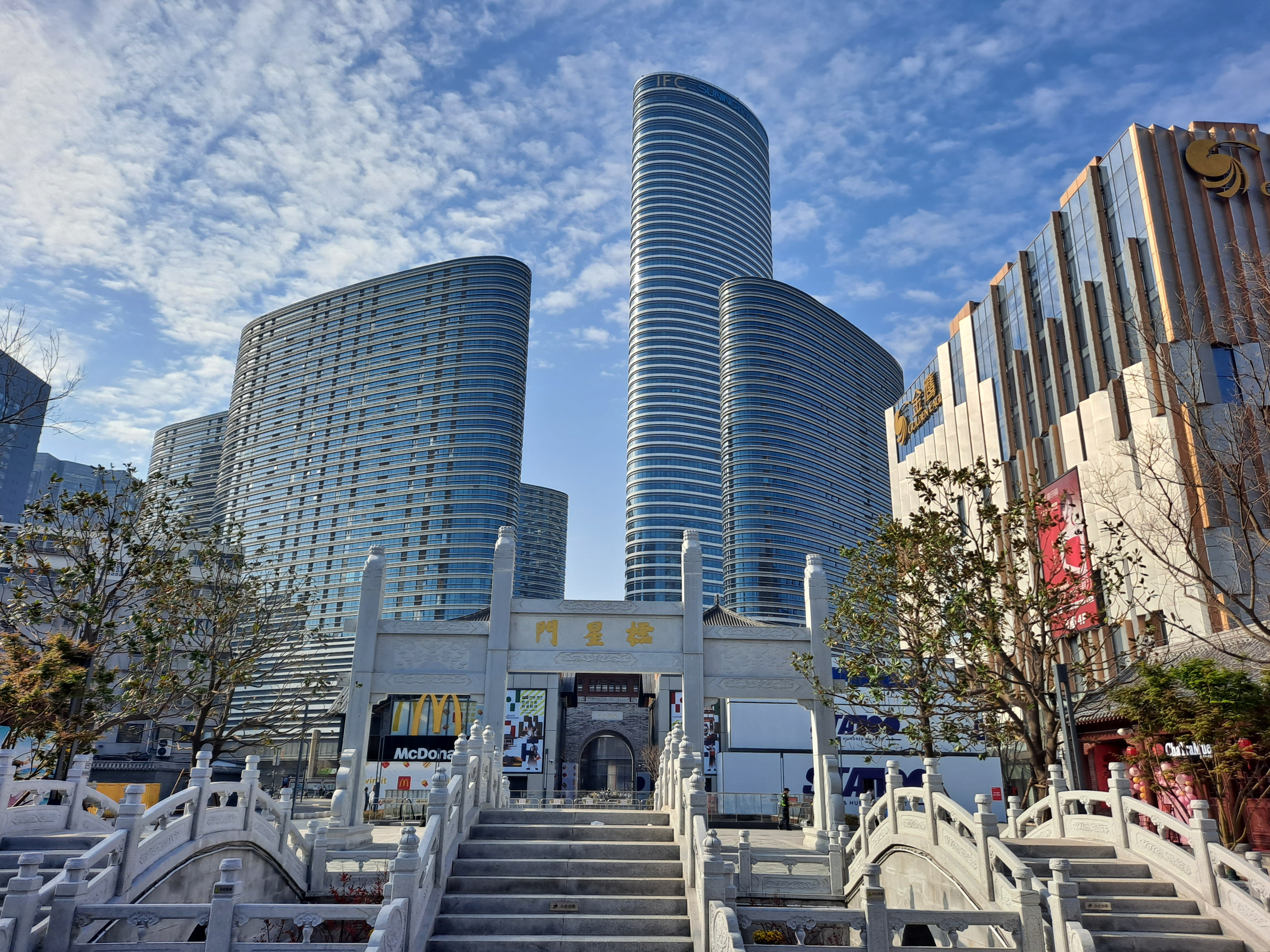

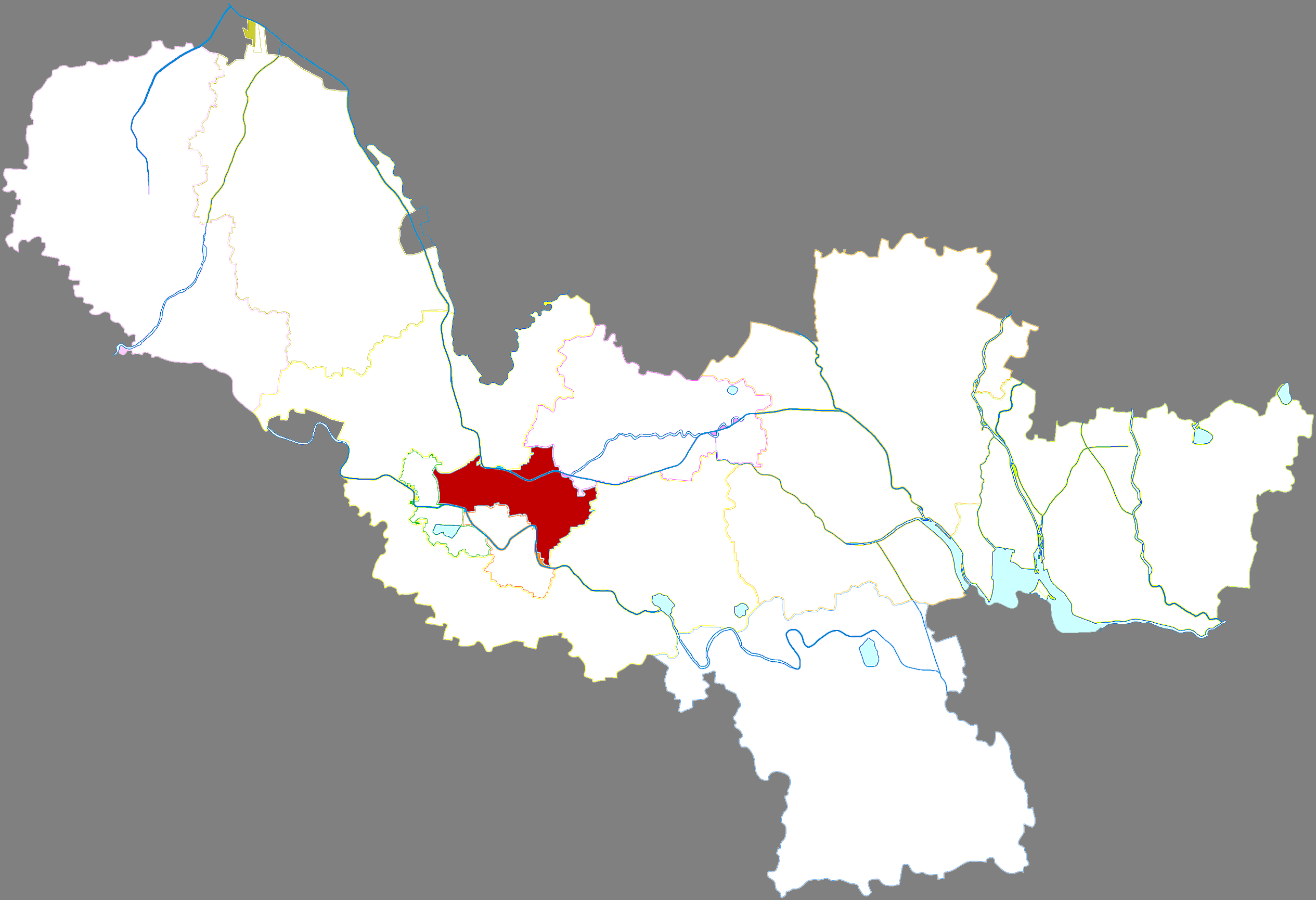
- Location in Xuzhou

- Xuzhou in Jiangsu
- Coordinates: 34°16′29″N 117°15′57″E
- Country: People's Republic of China
- Province: Jiangsu
- Prefecture-level city: Xuzhou

Area
  - Total: 90.8 km^{2} (35.1 sq mi)

Population (2016)
  - Total: 384,500
  - Density: 4,230/km^{2} (11,000/sq mi)
- Time zone: UTC+8 (China Standard)
- Postal code: 221005
- Website: www.xzgl.gov.cn

Gulou District (simplified Chinese: 鼓楼区; traditional Chinese: 鼓樓區; pinyin: Gǔlóu Qū) is a district of the city of Xuzhou, Jiangsu province, China. It is named after the drum tower of Xuzhou, which built in 1379 but ruined in 1952 because of falling into disrepair. Gulou District was a traditional business district before its expansion.

== History ==
In 1938, the urban area of Tongshan County, namely the former No. 1 District was separated out to establish Xuzhou City by the occupying Imperial Japanese military. KMT retained this administrative division after capitulation of Japan. It was renamed Gulou in 1955. After the Cultural Revolution began, it was renamed Yan'an (named after former communist revolutionary headquarter, Yan'an) in 1967, thereafter was restored its former name in 1980. Xuzhou Economic and Technological Development Zone was transferred to Gulou from Tongshan in 2005.

== Administrative districts ==
In the present, Gulou District has 8 subdistricts and 1 towns.

Administrative division	Population	Area (km^{2})	Density (per km^{2})
Pipa Subdistrict (琵琶街道)	29,593 (2010)	17.7	1,672
Huanglou Subdistrict (黄楼街道)	42,900 (2010)	1.8	23,833
Fengcai Subdistrict (丰财街道)	76,713 (2010)	9.7	7,909
Huancheng Subdistrict (环城街道)	83,311 (2010)	3.6	23,142
Pailou Subdistrict (牌楼街道)	22,012 (2010)	4.45	4,947
Tongpei Subdistrict (铜沛街道)	50,756 (2010)	6	8,459
Donghuan Subdistrict (东环街道)	24,932 (2010)	3.7	6,738
Jinshanqiao Subdistrict (金山桥街道)	31,598 (2010)	7	4,514
Miaoshan Town (庙山镇)	-	-	N/A

- Jiuli Subdistrict (九里街道) is merged to other.
