= Jiawang, Xuzhou =

Jiawang 贾汪区
- District
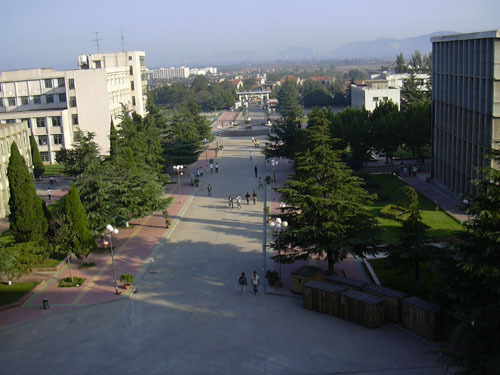

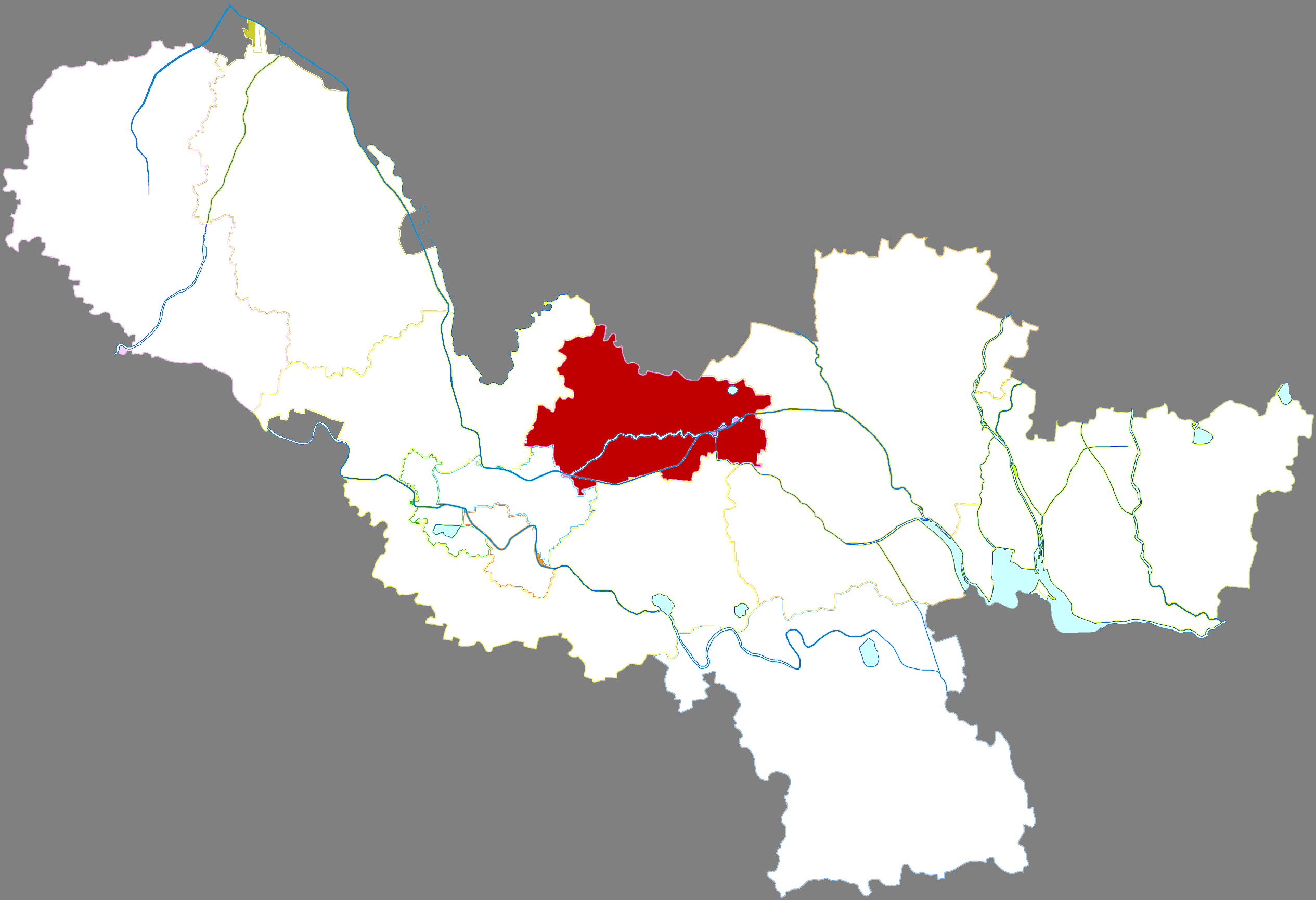
- Location in Xuzhou

- Location in Jiangsu
- Coordinates: 34°25′06″N 117°30′12″E
- Country: People's Republic of China
- Province: Jiangsu
- Prefecture-level city: Xuzhou

Area
  - Total: 690 km^{2} (270 sq mi)

Population (2020 census)
  - Total: 453,555
  - Density: 660/km^{2} (1,700/sq mi)
- Time zone: UTC+8 (China Standard)
- Postal Code: 221011
- Website: xzjw.gov.cn

Jiawang District (simplified Chinese: 贾汪区; traditional Chinese: 賈汪區; pinyin: Jiǎwāng Qū) is a suburban district of Xuzhou, Jiangsu province, China. It is located in the northern part of Xuzhou and adjacent to the prefecture-level city of Zaozhuang, Shandong in the north.

Originally a coal town and later a specialized industrial and mining area, Jiawang's economy was centered on coal production until the 2000s. The district initiated an economic diversification program alongside environmental remediation of legacy mining subsidence areas. In 2019, the State Council of China cited Jiawang as a model case for the redevelopment of resource-exhausted regions.

== History ==
Jiawang (贾汪; 賈汪; Chia-wang) contracts Jiajiawang (贾家汪; 賈家汪; Chia-chia-wang), a settlement established by the Jia clan near a local pond. Historical records also frequently substitute the homophonous variant (贾旺; 賈旺).

In 1880, flood erosion exposed coal outcrops, which prompted the Qing government to initiate industrial planning in 1882. Due to funding constraints, the project pivoted exclusively to coal. Founded in 1898, the Chiawang Mining Co. initially struggled with persistent losses due to poor transportation and manual extraction methods.

In 1912, the company was sold to the family of Yuan Shikai, who modernized operations by constructing a narrow-gauge railway to Liuquan (Liuchuan) to connect with the Tianjin–Pukou railway. Daily production soon exceeded 500 tons. Despite ownership transfers to Shanghai merchants during warlord conflicts, Chiawang developed into a modern enterprise with annual output surpassing 200,000 tons. Jiawang was officially recognized as a coal town in 1928.

Despite its expansion, the firm faced chronic capital shortages and heavy debt under the guaranteed dividend system. In the 1930s, entrepreneur Liu Hongsheng reorganized it into the Hua-tung (Huadong) Coal Mining Co., with annual production reaching 350,000 tons by 1936. However, miners faced harsh conditions and frequent wage arrears, triggering recurrent strikes from 1928 onwards.

By the mid-1930s, the company maintained a highly leveraged capital structure, with significant liabilities held by domestic lenders and the Deutsch-Asiatische Bank. After the 1937 invasion, management invoked German interests for nominal immunity. These maneuvers proved insufficient to deter expropriation, and the Imperial Japanese Army formally seized the mines in late 1938, renaming the operation Liuchuan Coal Mine (柳泉炭鉱, Ryūsen Tankō; 柳泉炭礦) under the North China Development Co., Ltd.

Meiji Mining provided technical support in 1943, and jurisdiction shifted to the Central China Development Co., Ltd. in March 1945. Following the war, managing director Saito Tasukushu (斉藤弼州) was convicted as a Class C war criminal for "forcible land acquisition" and "killing of residents." However, the Nationalist government reduced his sentence for ensuring the mining facilities were handed over intact.

In November 1948, during the Huaihai campaign, Generals He Jifeng and Zhang Kexia defected to the Communist forces at Jiawang with 23,000 troops, breaching Xuzhou's northeastern defenses. From 1949 to 1952, the town was officially renamed as the variant (贾旺) while serving as the seat of Tongshan county under Shandong's administration. Its original characters (贾汪) were restored when it returned to Jiangsu province in 1952.

Following the nationalization of the mines, the Jiawang Mining Bureau was established to manage in 1953, before being abolished in June 1958, and its mines were subordinated to the Xuzhou Mining Bureau in October. Soviet experts helped extend the lifespan of local shafts, and new deposits were discovered at Panjia'an and Dahuangshan. Jiawang District was officially established in 1965. Around 2000, most mines began closing due to resource depletion. In 2011, Jiawang was designated a national resource-exhausted district; its last coal mine was sealed in 2016.

== Administrative divisions ==
Jiawang District has 8 subdistricts and 5 towns.

Subdistricts

- Daquan (大泉)
- Laokuang (老矿)
- Pan'anhu (潘安湖)
- Dawu (大吴)
- Zhuyushan (茱萸山)
- Damiao (大庙)
- Dahuangshan (大黄山)
- Jinlonghu (金龙湖)

Towns

- Qingshanquan (青山泉)
- Zizhuang (紫庄)
- Tashan (塔山)
- Biantang (汴塘)
- Jiangzhuang (江庄)

== Geography ==
In northeastern Xuzhou, Jiawang occupies a transition zone between the southern fringes of the Shandong hills and the Huang-Huai alluvial plain. The regional topography consists of residual hills interspersed with alluvial plains, descending in elevation from the northwest toward the southeast. The district encompasses over 300 individual hills, primarily concentrated in the northern and eastern sectors. The Bulao River traverses the southern perimeter of the district, linking to the Grand Canal; on the eastern periphery, Mount Dadong [elevation 361 metres (1,184 ft)] serves as the highest point within the Xuzhou municipality.

== Public services ==
The district is served by three major medical institutions: Jiawang District People's Hospital, and the Jiawang and Dahuangshan campuses of Xuzhou Mining Group General Hospital. Educational infrastructure includes the main campus of the Kewen College of Jiangsu Normal University.
