= Yunlong, Xuzhou =

Yunlong 云龙区
- District
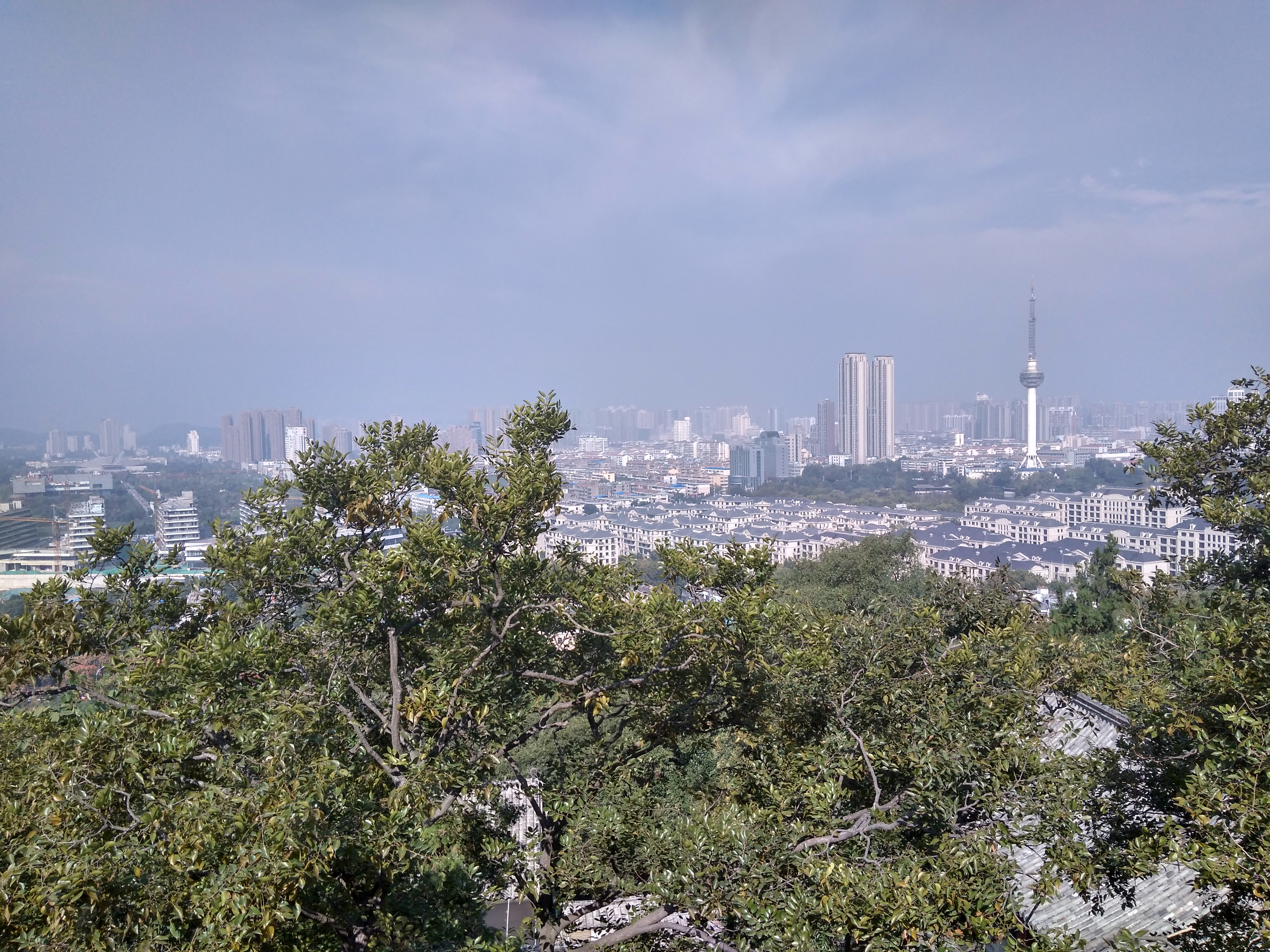

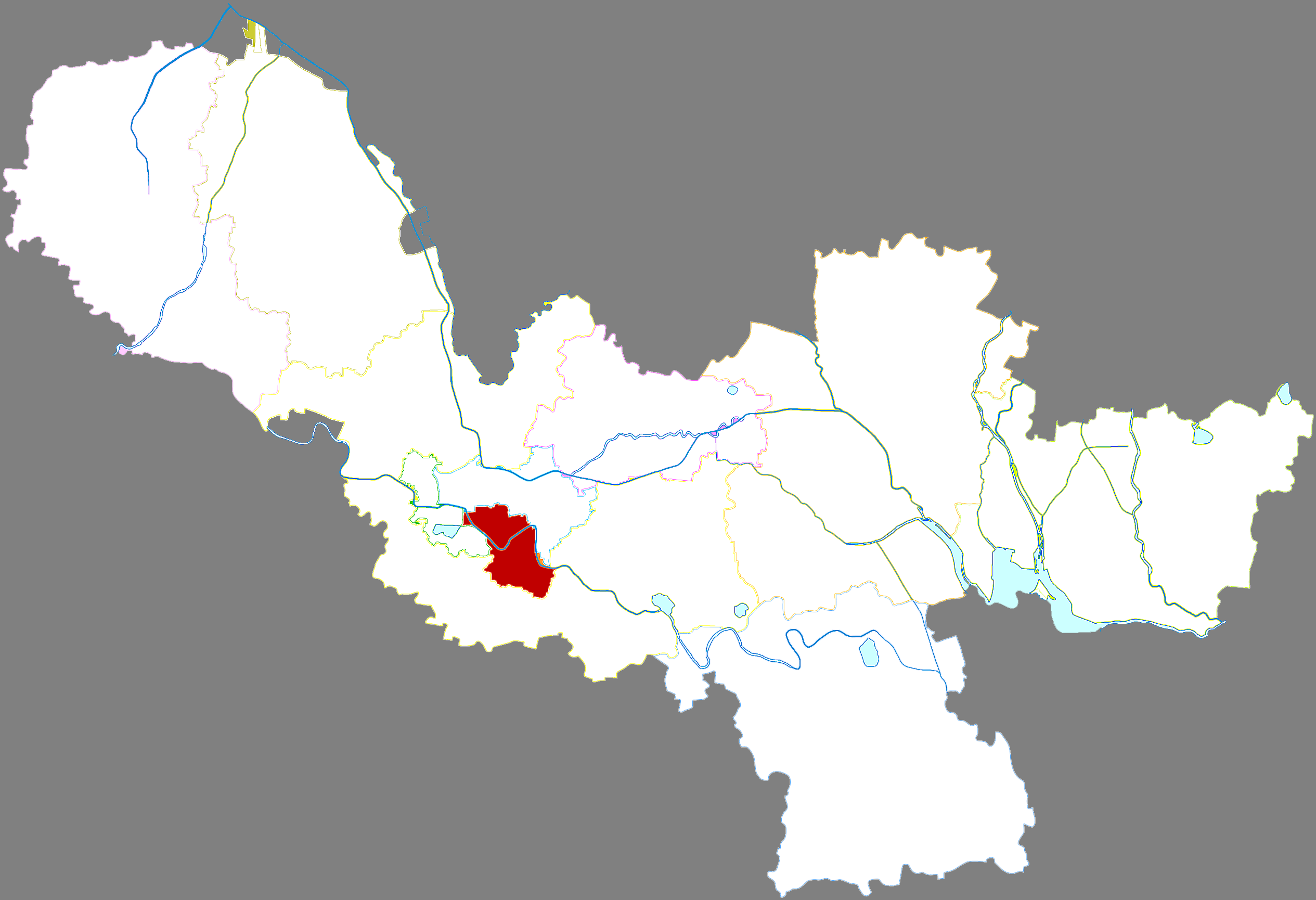
- Location in Xuzhou

- Xuzhou in Jiangsu
- Coordinates: 34°12′40″N 117°15′43″E
- Country: People's Republic of China
- Province: Jiangsu
- Prefecture-level city: Xuzhou

Area
  - Total: 118 km^{2} (46 sq mi)

Population (2020 census)
  - Total: 471,566
  - Density: 4,000/km^{2} (10,400/sq mi)
- Time zone: UTC+8 (China Standard)
- Postal code: 221000
- Website: www.xzyl.gov.cn

Yunlong District (simplified Chinese: 云龙区; traditional Chinese: 雲龍區; pinyin: Yúnlóng Qū; lit. 'cloud dragon') is one of six districts of Xuzhou, Jiangsu province, China.

== History ==
At the beginning of the Republic of China, the government abolished Xuzhou Prefecture and attached it to Guo Tongshan County. Later, Xu Haidao was established with its seat in Tongshan (modern Xuzhou). The Japanese pseudo by Tongshan County analyzed Xuzhou City, which was the capital of the pseudo-Huaihai Province. Yunlong District was founded in 1938, then known as the third district of Xuzhou City. After the founding of the People's Republic of China in 1952, the third district of Xuzhou was renamed Yunlong District. In 1968, Yunlong District was renamed Hongwei District, and in 1975, it reverted to being called Yunlong District again.

== Administrative divisions ==
In the present, Yunlong District has 9 subdistricts.

9 subdistricts

- Pengcheng (彭城街道)
- Qingnian (青年街道)
- Tianqiao (天桥街道)
- Zifang (子房街道)
- Huangshan (黄山街道)
- Luotuoshan (骆驼山街道)
- Daguozhuang (大郭庄街道)
- Cuipingshan (翠屏山街道)
- Pantang (潘塘街道)
