= Baiju =

Baiju may refer to:

- Nanjing baiju, a Chinese folk art form from Nanjing involving singing and storytelling
- Baiju, Jiangsu, a town in Yancheng, Jiangsu, China

== People with the given name ==
- Baiju Noyan (fl. 13th-century), a Mongol commander and noyan in Persia, Anatolia and Georgia
- Baiju Bawra ("Baiju the Insane", 1542–1613), Indian dhrupad singer
- Baiju Parthan (born 1956), Indian painter
- Baiju Dharmajan (born 1968), Indian guitarist
- Baiju Santhosh (born 1970), Indian film actor in Malayalam films
- Baiju Bhatt (born 1984/1985), American billionaire, co-founder of Robinhood
- Aarsha Chandini Baiju (born 2000), Indian film actress
- Mamitha Baiju (born 2000), Indian film actress

== See also ==
- Baijiu, Chinese distilled alcoholic beverage
