= Yuhuan guci =

Chinese performance art form

Yuhuan guci (simplified Chinese: 玉环鼓词; traditional Chinese: 玉環鼓詞; pinyin: Yùhuán Gǔcí), also known as changci (唱词) or "ballad-singing", is a traditional form of Chinese storytelling and quyi folk art. It is a regional offshoot of Wenzhou guci that was transmitted into Yuhuan, a county-level city on the coast of Taizhou in eastern Zhejiang Province, and subsequently sung in the local Taizhou dialect (specifically the Taiping dialect). Originally performed in the Wenzhou dialect and confined to the harbor-south (Xuanmen Bay area) of Yuhuan, the art was later adapted by third-generation performers into Taizhou dialect, gradually spreading across the entire county and enjoying considerable popularity in the mid-twentieth century. After a marked decline from the late 1970s onward, Yuhuan guci has been revived in the early twenty-first century through the efforts of local inheritors and was inscribed on the fifth batch of Zhejiang Province's intangible cultural heritage list in December 2016.

== History ==
=== Origins ===
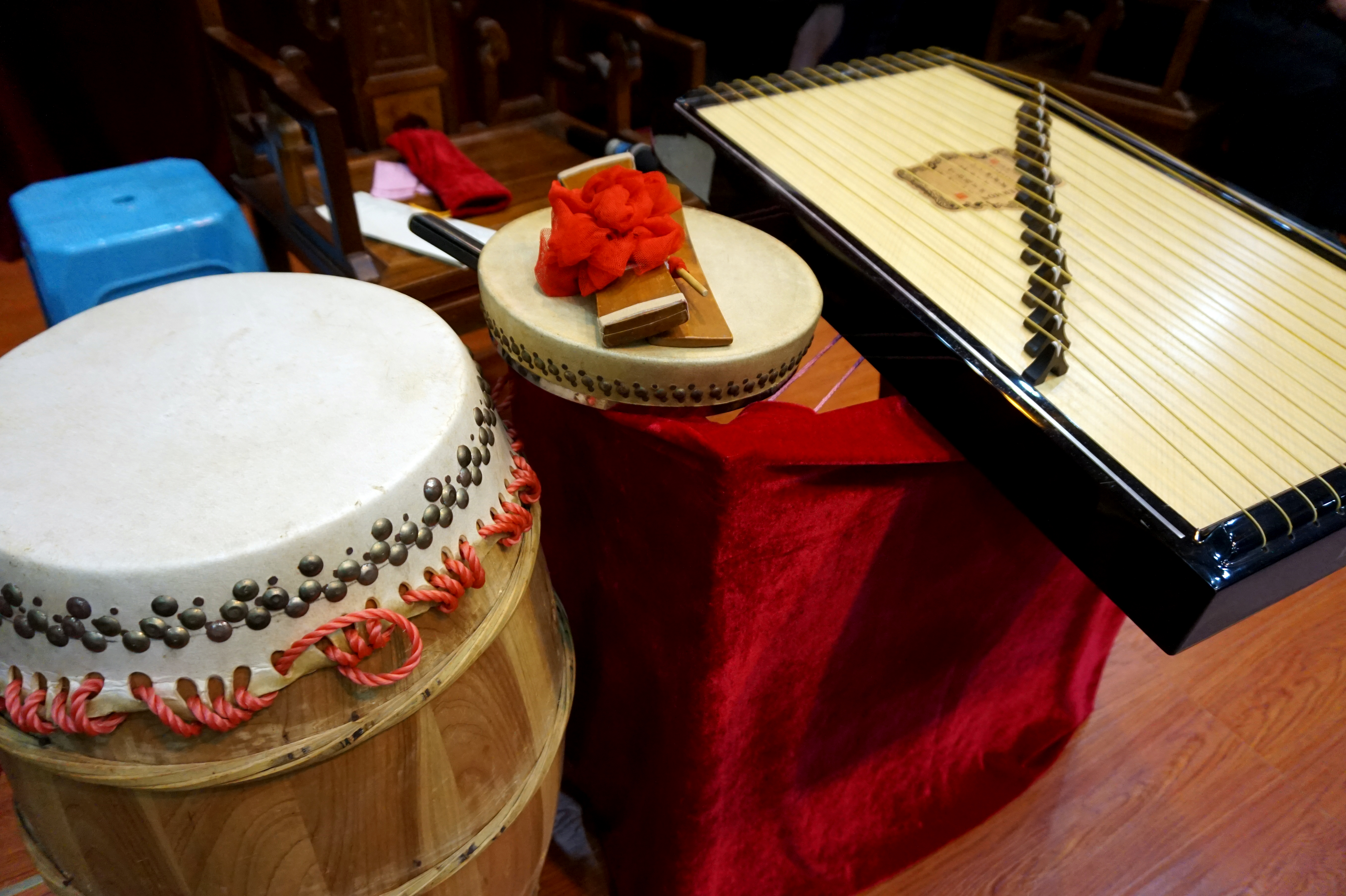
Instruments of Wenzhou guci. From left to right: large drum, sanliban, flat drum, and niujin qin (ox-bow zither).

Wenzhou guci first reached the harbor-south region of Yuhuan (the area south of Xuanmen Bay) during the late Qing dynasty, more than a century ago. Locally the art came to be called "changci" (literally "sung words"). The term "guci" (literally "drum words") itself derives from the principal instrument used in early performances, the flat drum. In its earliest form in Yuhuan, the singing was carried out in the Wenzhou dialect, and the repertoire consisted of adaptations of traditional material drawn from classical novels, myths, biographies, and folk legends. The musical line was relatively flat and monotonous, and the instrumental accompaniment was rudimentary, consisting of only a single drum and a yase (a simple percussion clapper). Because the majority of early performers were blind men who used the art as a means of livelihood, the transmission of the tradition faced serious structural difficulties.

After 1951, the Yuhuan County Guci Association (玉环县鼓词协会) was established, and individual performers were organised into the collective. Their activities became more frequent, and in 1964 a formal Yuhuan performing troupe was created, opening the field to educated young men and women. In the harbor-north area of Yuhuan (north of Xuanmen Bay), a third generation of performers led by Lin Taichuan (林太川) and Zhang Gengqing (张庚清) began to sing in the Taizhou dialect (including the local Taiping speech) used across the northern side of the bay, and the art gradually won acceptance in that region. Performances soon extended to the entire county, with performers touring the countryside. In addition to the traditional repertoire, they adapted and created new works based on themes of revolutionary struggle, which proved very popular. The performers also absorbed elements from local opera and a variety of other musical traditions. The accompaniment was expanded to include the erhu, the sanxian, the harmonica, as well as gongs and cymbals among the percussion, and the performance format itself evolved from solo singing to duets, three-person ensembles, and four-person group shows, considerably widening the audience for Yuhuan guci. At its height, the influence of Yuhuan guci extended across the whole of the prefecture-level city of Taizhou.

Following the end of the Cultural Revolution, Yuhuan guci experienced a brief revival in the late 1970s. It then entered a long period of decline. In an attempt to reverse the trend, Zhang Gengqing and other performers took on apprentices and toured with their disciples through the harbor-north countryside and the neighboring cities of Wenling, Huangyan, and Linhai, performing in the Taizhou dialect, but the effort ultimately failed to halt the decline. From the 1990s onward, with the spread of television and film into ordinary households and the diversification of popular entertainment, Yuhuan guci progressively lost its audience. Performances came to be confined largely to local temple fairs, and the art withdrew from the main stage, surviving only with great difficulty. Between 2008 and 2009 the tradition crossed the point of no return from prosperity to decline. Only a small number of performers remained active, and the audience had shrunk dramatically compared with earlier decades; Yuhuan guci survived, as local commentators put it, "in the cracks."

=== Transmission and protection ===
In an effort to preserve Yuhuan guci, on New Year's Day 2008 Zhang Gengqing and his disciples self-funded a touring campaign entitled "Yuhuan Guci, Singing Across Taizhou" (玉环鼓词，唱响台州), which took in more than ten villages in the prefecture. They composed new items that engaged with contemporary life and added comic elements to the performance. When the Yuhuan County Intangible Cultural Heritage Survey was completed later that year, Yuhuan guci was entered into the county-level list of surveyed items. In June 2009, the art was placed on the third batch of the Taizhou municipal intangible cultural heritage list, becoming the object of a local support policy. Public attention to the art form increased steadily thereafter, and Yuhuan guci was also performed at the China Yuhuan Island Cultural Festival (中国·玉环海岛文化节).

By 2010, only a dozen or so performers were still active, most of them over the age of forty, and almost no young performers were entering the field. On 28 October 2010, Mo Lingzhi (莫灵芝), a young woman born in 1984, formally apprenticed herself to Zhang Gengqing. Other representative inheritors of Yuhuan guci include Bao Kongde (鲍孔德), Bao Disheng (鲍迪胜) and Jiang Xingping (蒋兴平). Bao Kongde began studying under Zhang Gengqing at the age of seventeen and later served as vice-chairman of the Taizhou Quyi Artists' Association, the first time a guci artist had entered the leadership of the association. Bao Disheng became a person with disability in 1985 following an accident and took up Yuhuan guci two years later; by 2015 he had been performing for more than thirty years.

Jiang Xingping was introduced to the art in 1989 and was formally apprenticed to Zhang Gengqing, becoming a sixth-generation inheritor of Yuhuan guci. While continuing to respect tradition, he has combined popular contemporary themes with the inherited form to create works that engage with everyday life. In the second half of 2008 he founded the "Morning Star" (晨之星) Peasant Art Troupe, later renamed "Man Haowang" (蛮好望, a phrase meaning "very nice to look at" in the Yuhuan dialect), which recruited enthusiasts of the performing arts to perform in the countryside. In 2013 he carried out a further reform of the tradition, integrating guci into a situational drama format. In March 2016, Jiang Xingping registered and founded the Zhejiang Man Haowang Cultural Communication Company Limited (浙江蛮好望文化传播有限公司), thereby launching the professional operation of the art. On 2 November 2016 the company was designated as one of the first batch of Yuhuan City Intangible Cultural Heritage Inheritance Bases (Yuhuan City Intangible Cultural Heritage Inheritance Bases). Jiang Xingping has also organised performances of Yuhuan guci in local schools.

On 30 December 2016, the Zhejiang Provincial People's Government promulgated the fifth batch of Zhejiang Province Intangible Cultural Heritage Representative Items List, which includes Yuhuan guci. With this designation, Yuhuan guci has been placed on the intangible cultural heritage protection lists at the Yuhuan, Taizhou, and Zhejiang levels. At the same time, through continuous reform and adaptation to the times, the art has gradually attracted renewed attention from all sectors of society. On the afternoon of 15 August 2020, the Yuhuan Guci Art and Culture Exhibition Hall (玉环鼓词艺术文化展示馆) opened in the Wendan Huakai Creative Industrial Park in Qinggang Town, with Jiang Xingping serving as its director. The hall displays the props and instruments used in guci performances and is equipped with recording facilities, allowing visitors to listen to and personally try out the instruments, experiencing the unique charm of the art.

== Characteristics and instruments ==
In performance, Yuhuan guci places emphasis on clear diction, rounded vocal tone, and steady rhythm. The textual sources of the sung material fall into three traditional forms: "zheshuer" (折书儿, "folded-book" pieces), "xiaoshuo" (小说, "novels"), and "bushu" (部书, "book-length" works). The verse is built primarily on seven- and ten-character lines, with five-character lines and dieban (叠板, "stacked-board") passages also used. The rhyming is natural and harmonious, with attention to the musical quality of the syllables. A single performer handling a solo programme may play as many as four to six instruments at once while simultaneously portraying the male, female, painted-face, and clown roles familiar from Chinese opera. The performer must switch between characters of widely differing personality, temperament, and emotional state, imitating a variety of voices and giving a finely drawn account both of the characters and of the unfolding plot.

The instrumental ensemble of Yuhuan guci is conventionally described as "one qin, one drum, one pai, and one bang" (一琴一鼓一拍一梆). The "qin" is the niujin qin (literally "ox-bow zither"), whose strings are made of ox sinew; it carries fifteen strings, is fitted with a single guzhu, and is held vertically in front of the performer, who strikes it with the drumstick to produce a sound that is sweet and resonant, somewhat heavier than that of an ordinary zither. In the earliest period there was no zither at all, only a drum. The "drum" is the biangu (flat drum), also called the "ci drum" (词鼓), with a head made of cowhide. The "pai" refers to the sanliban (三粒板, "three-grain clappers"), also known as the yase (押瑟) or sanlipai (三粒拍); it consists of two thin and one thick piece of jujube wood, with two of the pieces glued together and joined to the third by a red cord, and is played in a manner similar to the kuaiban ("quick clappers"). The "bang" is called the baoyue (抱月, "embracing the moon"), a small wooden block.

In performance, four wooden stools are turned upside down and bound together with cords to form a net-like frame. The flat drum is placed on the right-front of this frame, the niujin qin is laid horizontally in the centre, and the baoyue is tied to the right-hand stool-leg, with a curtain hung in front. The performer sits on a chair holding the sanliban in the left hand and the guzhu in the right. By striking the niujin qin the performer can produce the five notes of the Chinese pentatonic scale (gong, shang, jue, zhi, and yu), while simultaneously tapping the sanliban against the left wrist to keep the rhythmic pulse of the music.

== Value ==
Yuhuan guci is a narrative and lyrical form of expression. Its lines are plain and accessible, reflecting the regional aesthetic of the Yuhuan area. The art has a strong local colour, distinctive artistic features, and a unique cultural identity. It has value for the humanities in terms of language and script, literary and artistic form, and social custom. Yuhuan guci is said to have a moralising influence on its listeners, producing an educative effect.

== See also ==
- Wenzhou guci
- Quyi
- Intangible cultural heritage
