= Suwenxue congkan =

Facsimile collection of Chinese drama

- Country: Taiwan
- Language: Chinese
- Discipline: Chinese literature, Chinese opera, Quyi
- Publisher: Shin Wen Feng Print Company
- Published: 2002–2016
- No. of books: 620

Suwenxue congkan (Chinese: 俗文學叢刊; pinyin: Súwénxué cóngkān; lit. 'Book series of folk literature'), with the English-language subheading Folk Literature: Materials in the Collection of the Institute of History and Philology, is a 620-volume collection of photomechanically reproduced Chinese performative literature issued by Shin Wen Feng Print Company (新文豐出版公司) in Taipei from 2002 to 2016. One of the most prominent Chinese collections, it includes over 10,000 Quyi and Chinese opera texts from the 18th century in the holdings of the Fu Ssu-Nien Library of the Institute of History and Philology at the Academia Sinica in Taiwan.

== Significance ==
Suwenxue congkan is one of the most important sources of Chinese performative literature research in current times. The collection contains performative texts from the Qianlong period (1736–1795) to the early Republican times. They were issued in China until the 1930s and are freely available. The quality of the copies varies greatly; masters’ delicate editions come with obvious mass production. The materials were collected by the historian Fu Ssu-nien (1896–1950), the founding director of the Institute of History and Philology at the Academia Sinica.

A digital database in which all work titles of the collection are indexed has been established by the East Asian Faculty of Ruhr-Universität Bochum.

== Content ==
The Collection issued approximately 20,000 titles in more than 10,000 fascicles. The printed anthology is divided into Generalia (including reproductions of entire special journals, sheet music and materials for instrument lessons) and the main part with photomechanical reproduction of performative texts. These are sorted by genres and historical periods in which the plays take place. The drama texts belong to different regional genres, including Gaoqiang (高腔), Kunqu, Peking opera, Hui opera, Teochew opera and Cantonese opera.

There are also texts for shadow plays, tanhuang (彈簧), ballads, and folklores. Volumes 501 to 600 should be attached with an entire index, for all quyi texts.

== Sources ==
- Sūwénxué cóngkān 俗文學叢刊 / Folk Literature: Materials in the Collection of the Institute of History and Philology. 2002–2016. Taipei: Shin Wen Feng.
