= Kuaibanshu =

Kuaibanshu (simplified Chinese: 快板书; traditional Chinese: 快板書; pinyin: Kuàibǎnshū; lit. 'fast boards') is a form of oral storytelling performance that is popular in northern China. It is a type of shuochang, somewhat similar to Vietnamese vè or rapping.

== Background ==
Kuaiban literally means fast boards. It is also known as kuai shu, literally meaning fast books. In Beijing dialect, the art form is known as kuaibanr.

"Kuaiban" is a performance that highly emphasize on “repetition”; in each performance, the rhythm is the same. Its name refers to bamboo clappers, a set of small bamboo boards or bones, which the performer rattles to produce an accompanying beat (similar to rapping).

Bamboo has a special sacred meaning. In Chinese tradition culture, bamboo symbolizes the elasticity, longevity, happiness and spiritual truth of life. It is used as a writing instrument in all parts of the East; for Buddhist and Taoist writers and artists, the straight lines and hollow structure of bamboo have extremely profound symbolic meanings.

The free rhyming style is called "flower point". The line should have seven words. This rule, however, is not strictly followed if the rhythmic beat and rhyme coincide to allow more words or fewer words.

== History ==
While bones have been used as musical instruments in China for thousands of years, kuaiban in its modern form was pioneered by Li Runjie of Tianjin in the 1940s.

== Performance ==
During weekend evenings, groups of middle-aged and elderly people perform kuaiban on the south side of the hill in Jingshan Park in Beijing.
