= Bamboo clapper =

Musical instrument

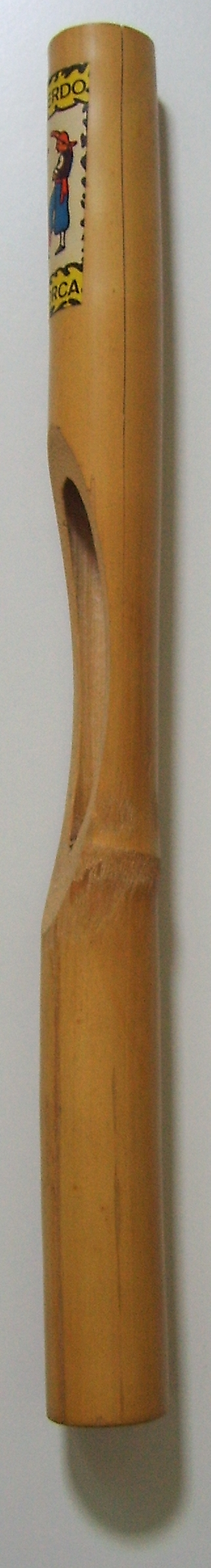
Bamboo clapper (ဝါးလက်ခုပ်)

Bamboo clappers are a traditional Chinese percussion instrument and a traditional Burmese instrument. Reflecting its name, it is made with boards of bamboo. Bamboo clappers are used in Chinese kuaiban storytelling performances.

== See also ==
- Chinese music
- List of Chinese musical instruments
- Traditional Japanese musical instruments
