= Jingshan Park =

Historic park in Beijing, China

- 景山公园
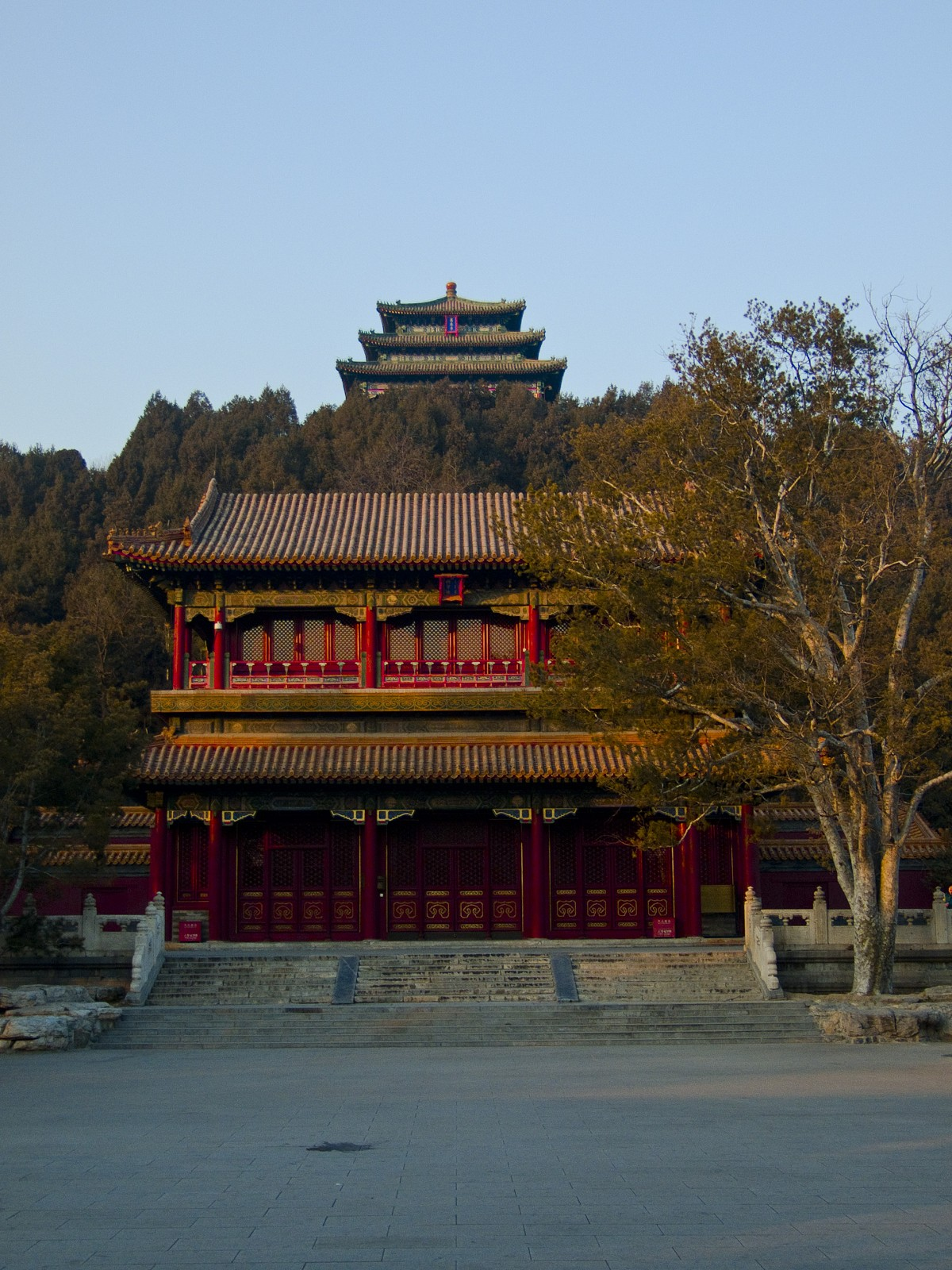
- One of the peaks of Jingshan

- Location within Beijing Location within China
- Type: Urban park
- Location: Beijing, China
- Coordinates: 39°55′25″N 116°23′26″E
- Area: 23 ha (57 acres)
- Created: 11th century (built the hill); 1179 (as imperial garden); 1267 (rebuilt); 1651 (rebuilt); 1928 (as public park)

Jingshan
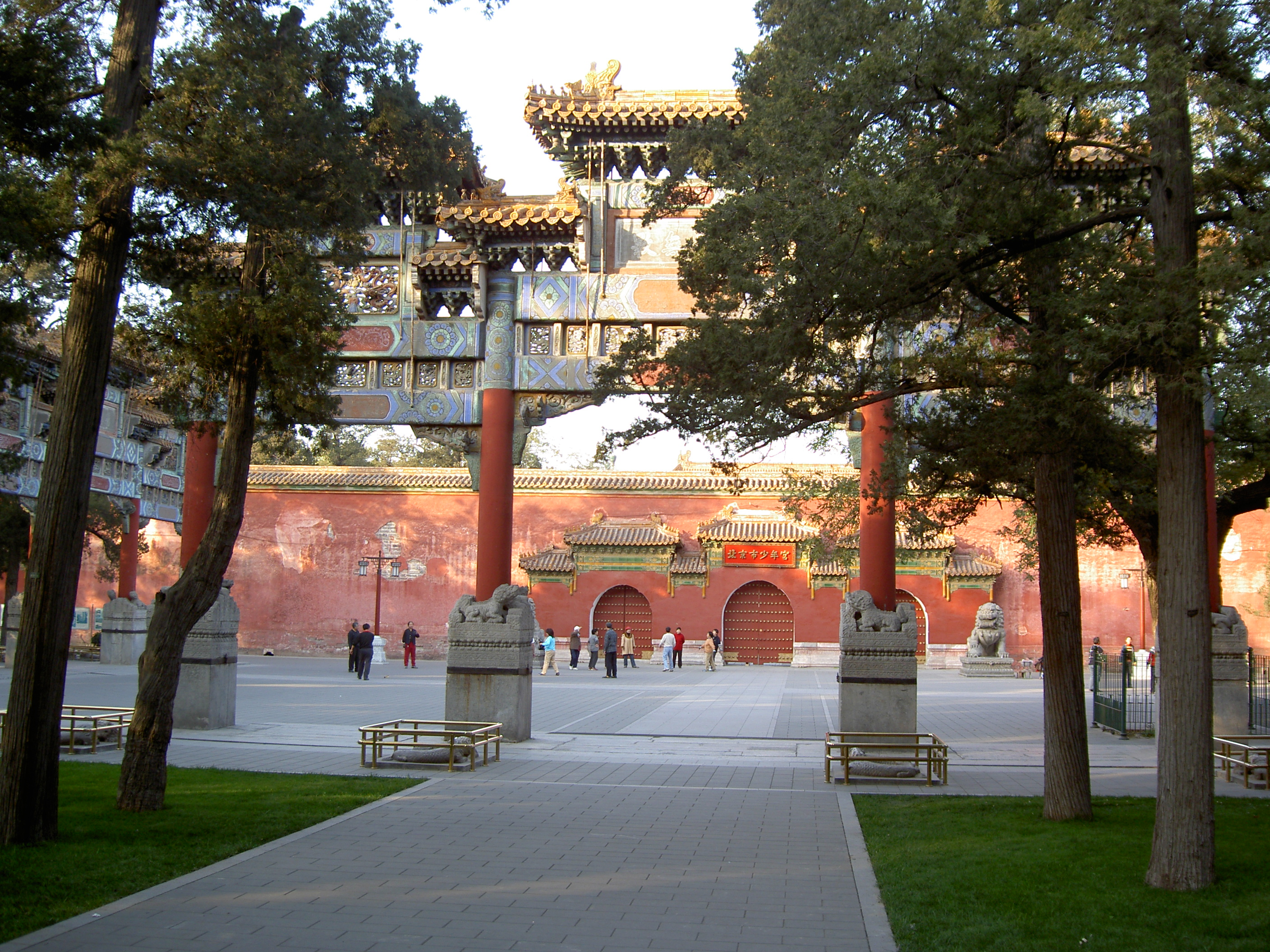
- Paifang
- Chinese: 景山
- Literal meaning: Prospect Hill
Transcriptions
Standard Mandarin
- Hanyu Pinyin: Jǐngshān
- Wade–Giles: Ching-shan

Wansui Hill
- Traditional Chinese: 萬歲山
- Simplified Chinese: 万岁山
- Literal meaning: Long-life Hill; Ten-Thousand Year Hill
Transcriptions
Standard Mandarin
- Hanyu Pinyin: Wànsuìshān
- Wade–Giles: Wan-sui Shan

Feng Shui Hill
- Traditional Chinese: 風水山
- Simplified Chinese: 风水山
Transcriptions
Standard Mandarin
- Hanyu Pinyin: Fēngshuǐshān
- Wade–Giles: Feng-shui Shan

Coal Hill
- Chinese: 煤山
Transcriptions
Standard Mandarin
- Hanyu Pinyin: Méishān
- Wade–Giles: Mei-shan

Jingshan Park is an imperial park covering 23 hectares (57 acres) immediately north of the Forbidden City in the Imperial City area of Beijing, China. The focal point is the artificial hill Jingshan (景山, lit. 'Prospect Hill'). (Note: The term 景 translated here as "prospect" is actually a term of art in Chinese gardening, referring to "the scenic and emotional focal points in a garden’s design, the sites of richest sensory experience".) Formerly a private imperial garden attached to the grounds of the Forbidden City, the grounds were opened to the public in 1928. The park was formally established in 1949. It is listed as a Key State Park and is administratively part of Xicheng District in downtown Beijing.

== History ==
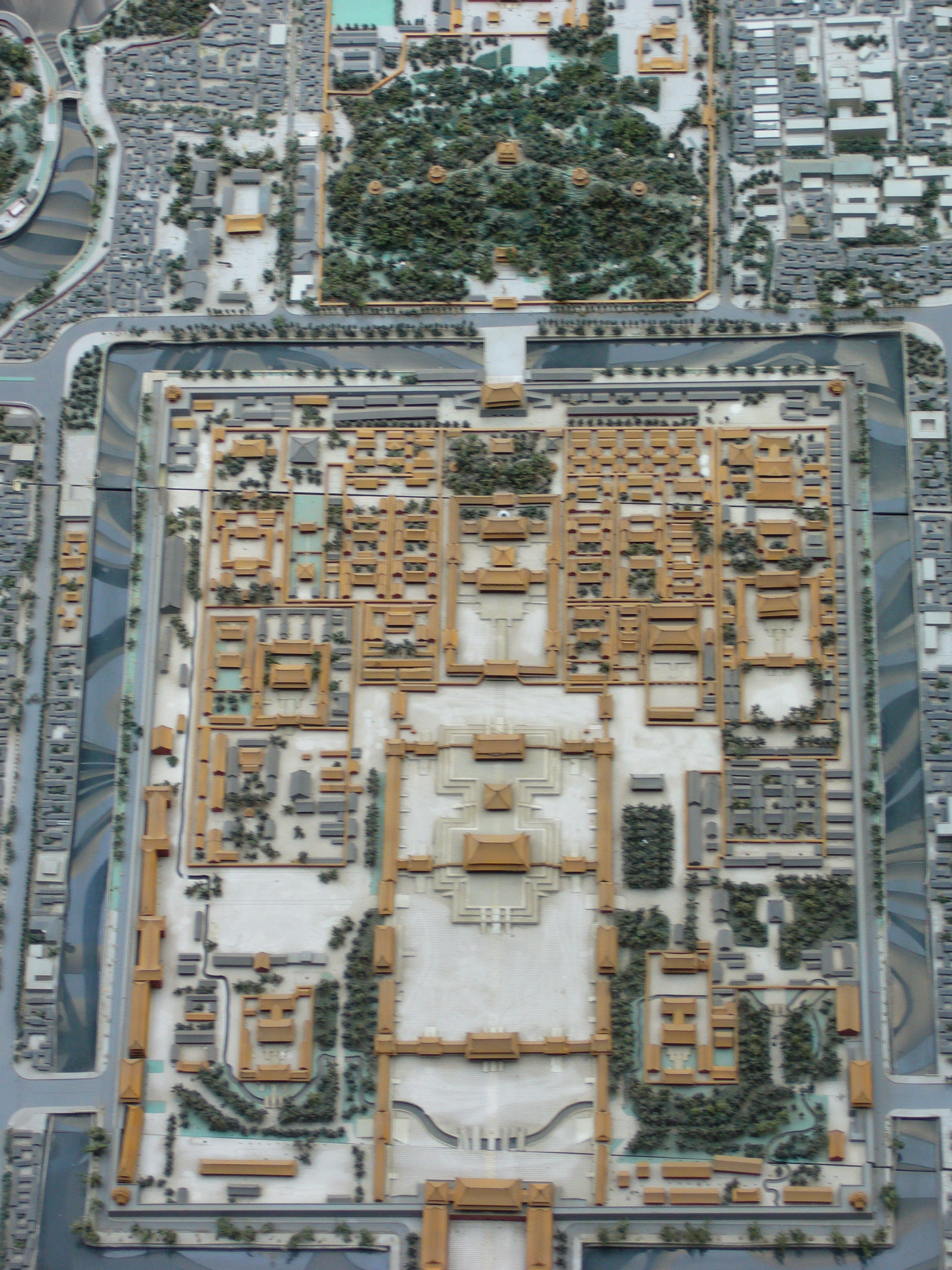
Model showing Jingshan Park north of the Forbidden City.

Jingshan's history dates to the Liao and Jin dynasties, almost a thousand years ago. The 45.7-meter (150 ft) high artificial hill was constructed in the Yongle era of the Ming dynasty entirely from the soil excavated in forming the moats of the Imperial Palace and nearby canals. All of this material was moved by manual labor and animal power. Jingshan consists of five individual peaks, and on the top of each peak there lies an elaborate pavilion. These pavilions were used by officials for gathering and leisure purposes. These five peaks also draw the approximate historical axis of central Beijing.

The dictates of feng shui long praised tombs and residences sited south of a nearby hill, serving to channel both harmful yin and cold northern winds. With Jingshan serving that purpose, it gained the name Feng Shui Hill. It is also well known to locals as Coal Hill, from an old rumor that the emperors kept a hidden stash in the park.

The Chongzhen Emperor, the last ruler of the Ming dynasty, committed suicide by hanging himself from a tree in Jingshan in 1644 after Beijing fell to Li Zicheng's rebel forces.

== Relationship with the Forbidden City ==
Jingshan Hill is separated from the Forbidden City by the palace moat. However, until 1928 the park sat directly by the moat and was accessible on the south side only from the Forbidden City via the Gate of Divine Might. In 1928, a new road (New Jingshan Street) was built to the north of the palace moat. This fully separated Jingshan Hill from the Forbidden City. The Gate of Divine Might became the back door of the Palace Museum, and the front gate of Jingshan Park now stood to the north of the new road.

The street addresses of both the Forbidden City and Jingshan Park are on New Jingshan Street. Jingshan Park is now a popular place for people to gather and socialize. One can often find elderly folks dancing, singing opera and doing other cultural activities, such as kuaiban, at Jingshan Park.

== Access ==
The park has four entrances, one in each of the cardinal directions, but only three are currently open to the public. The south entrance is located across Jingshan Front Street from the Forbidden City and is accessible by Beijing Bus routes 101, 103, 109, 124, 202, 211, 609 and 685. The west entrance on Jingshan West Street and Doushan Street is a short walk from the east gate of Beihai Park and is accessible by Bus routes 5 and 609. Trolleybus routes 111 and 124 stop at the east entrance. The north entrance is currently closed to the public. It is at the T-intersection between Jingshan Back Street and Di'anmen Inner Street and is accessible by Bus routes 5, 111, 124 and 609.

== Gallery ==
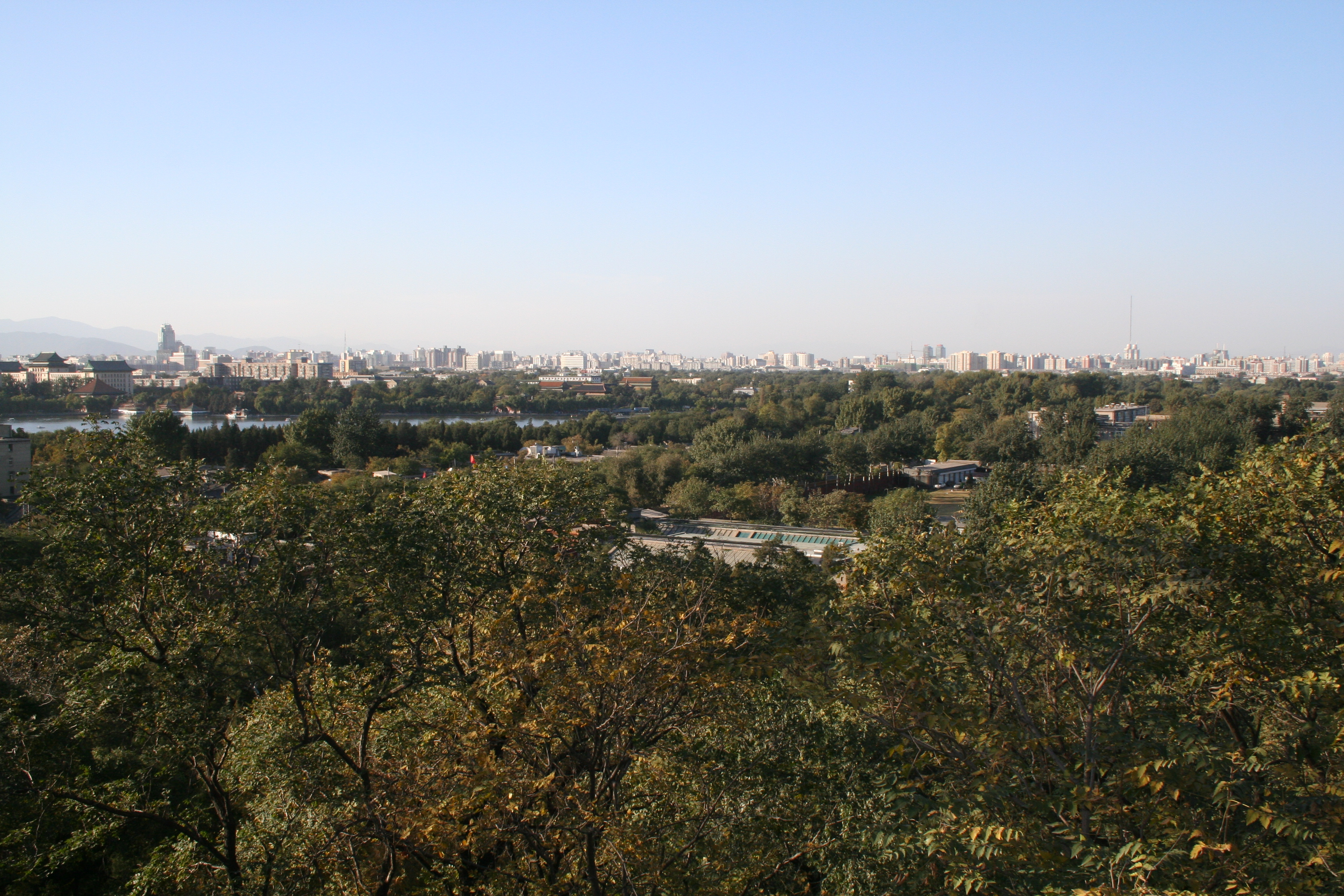
View from the top of Jingshan

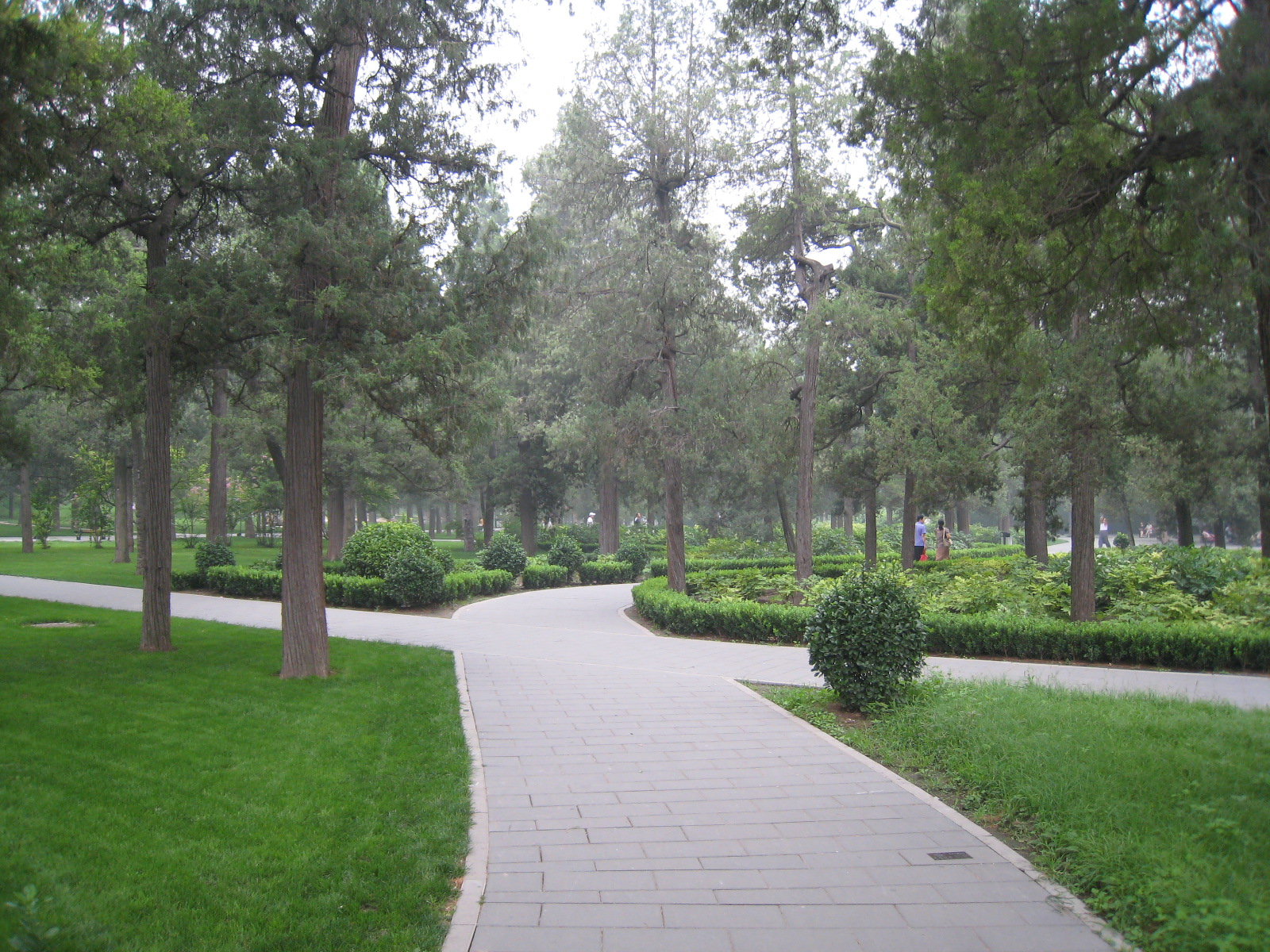
A walk through the park

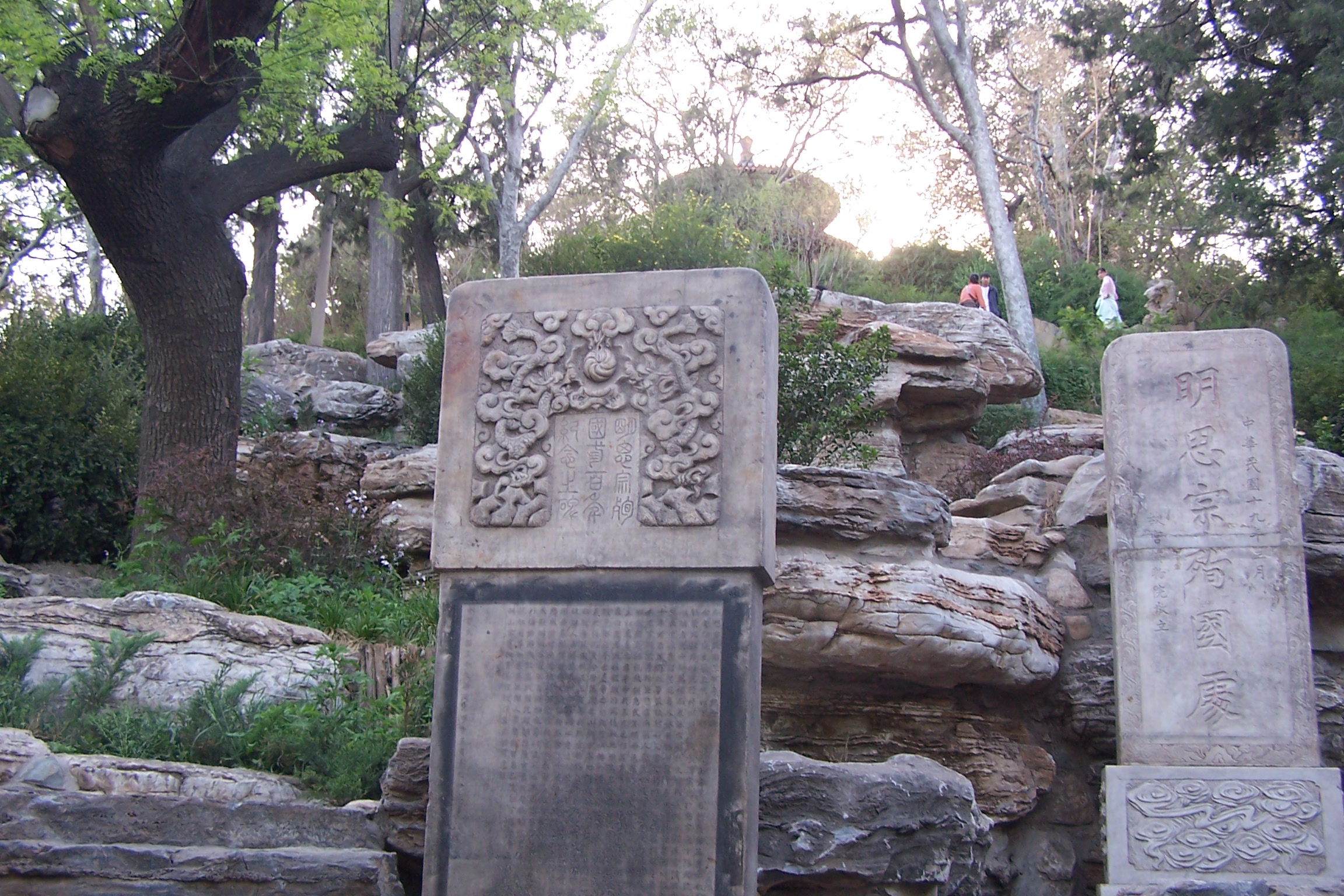
Stone tablets in Jingshan

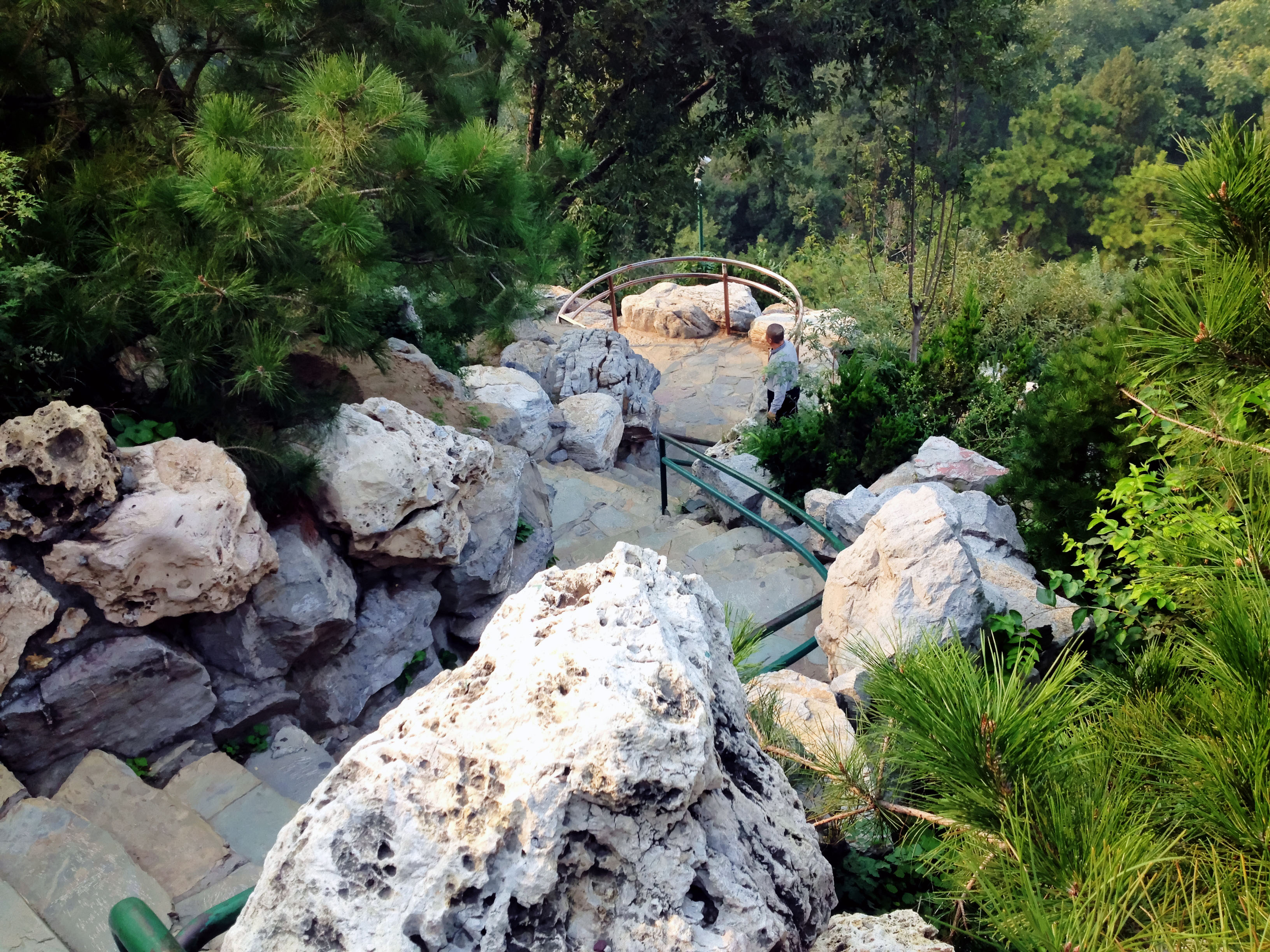
Steps leading uphill

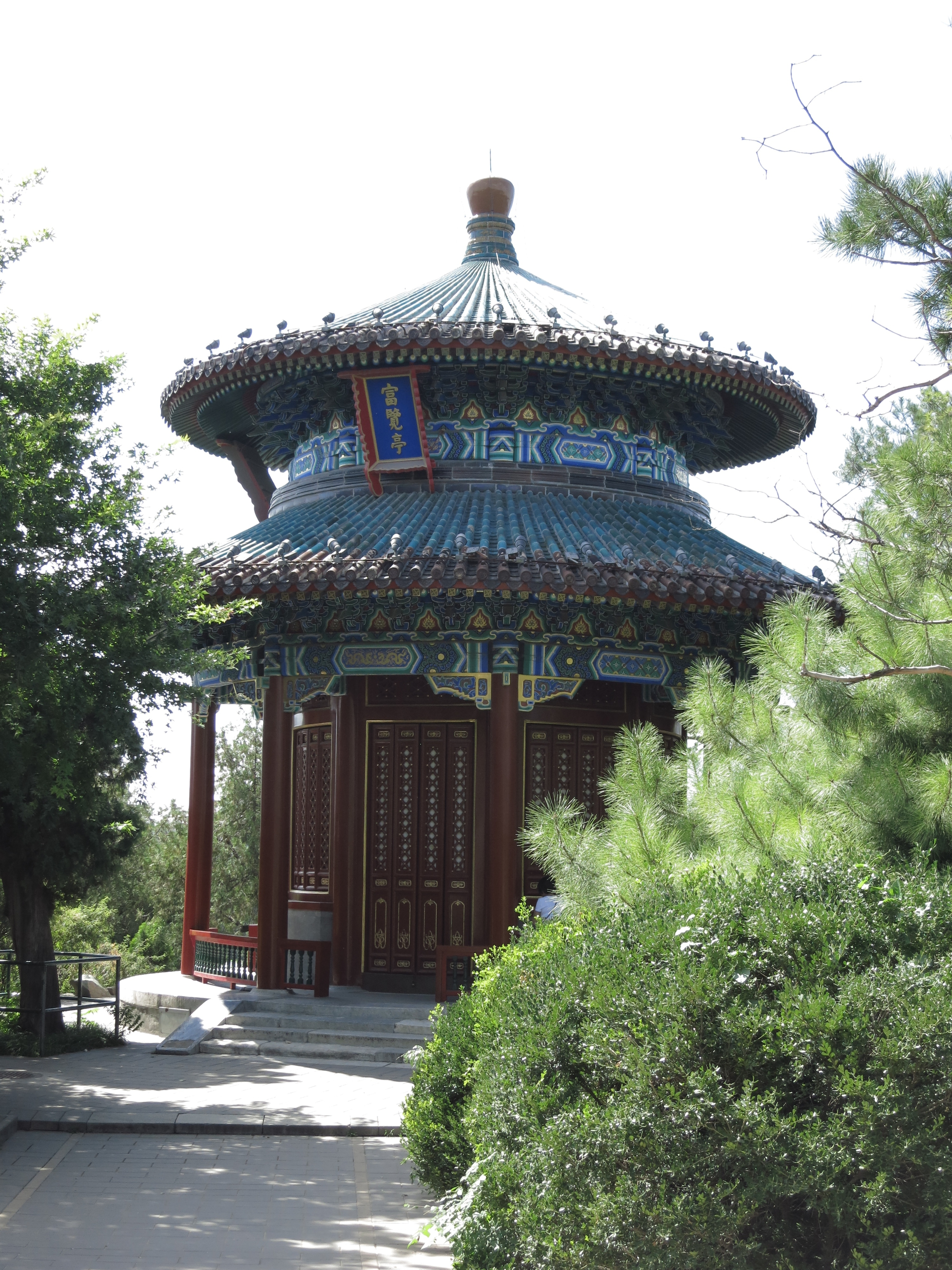
Fulan Pavilion (富览亭)

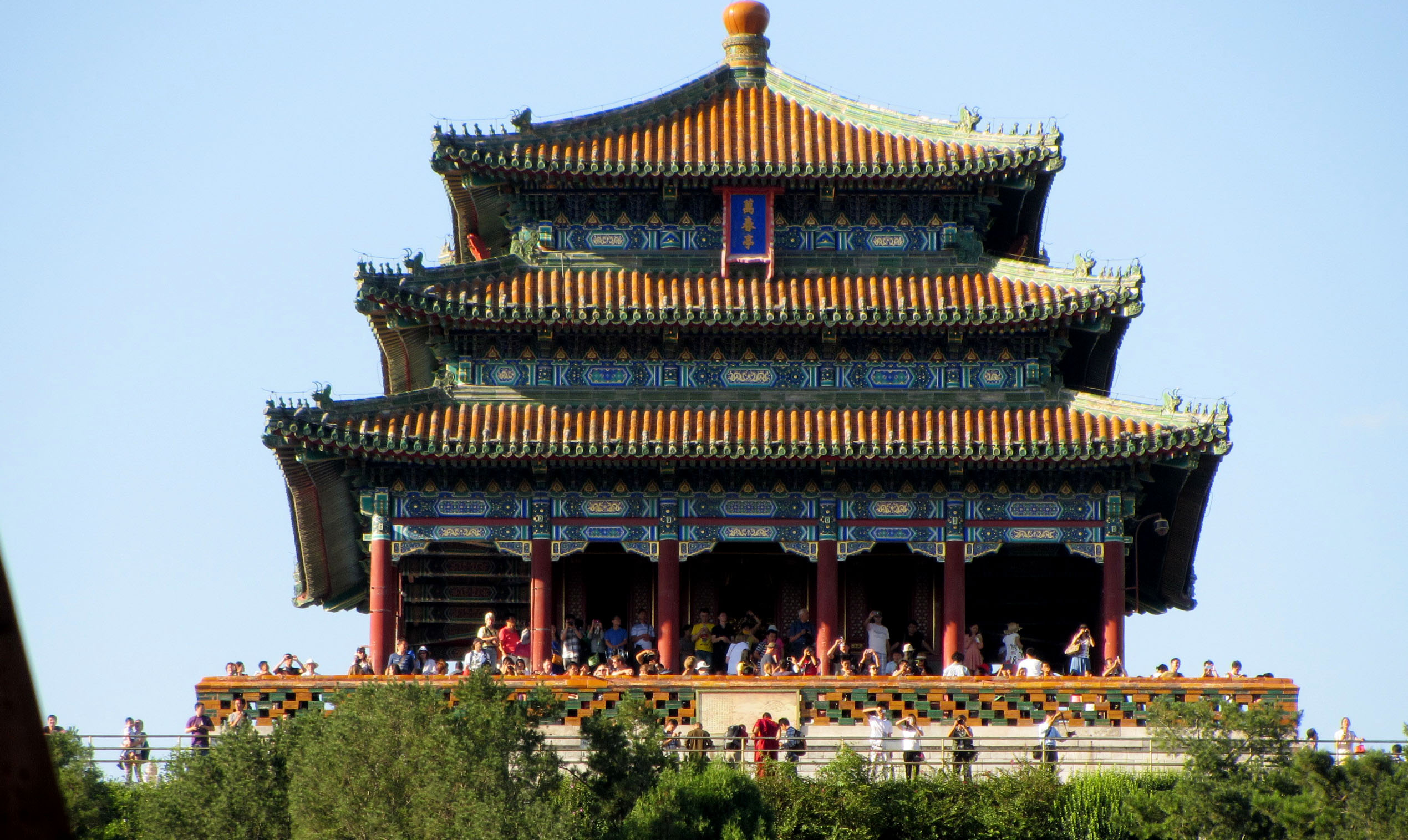
Wanchun Pavilion (万春亭)

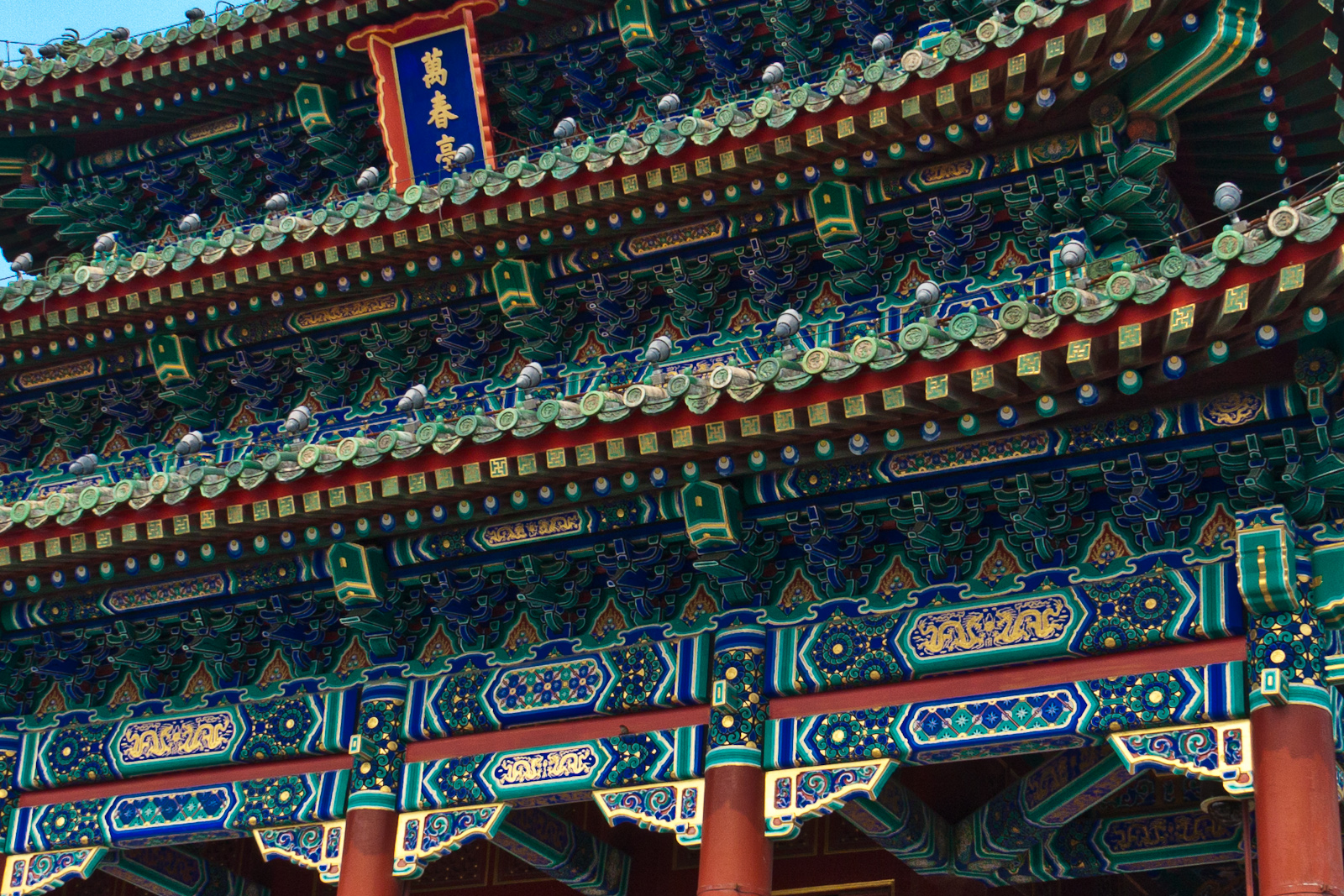
Wanchun Pavilion close-up

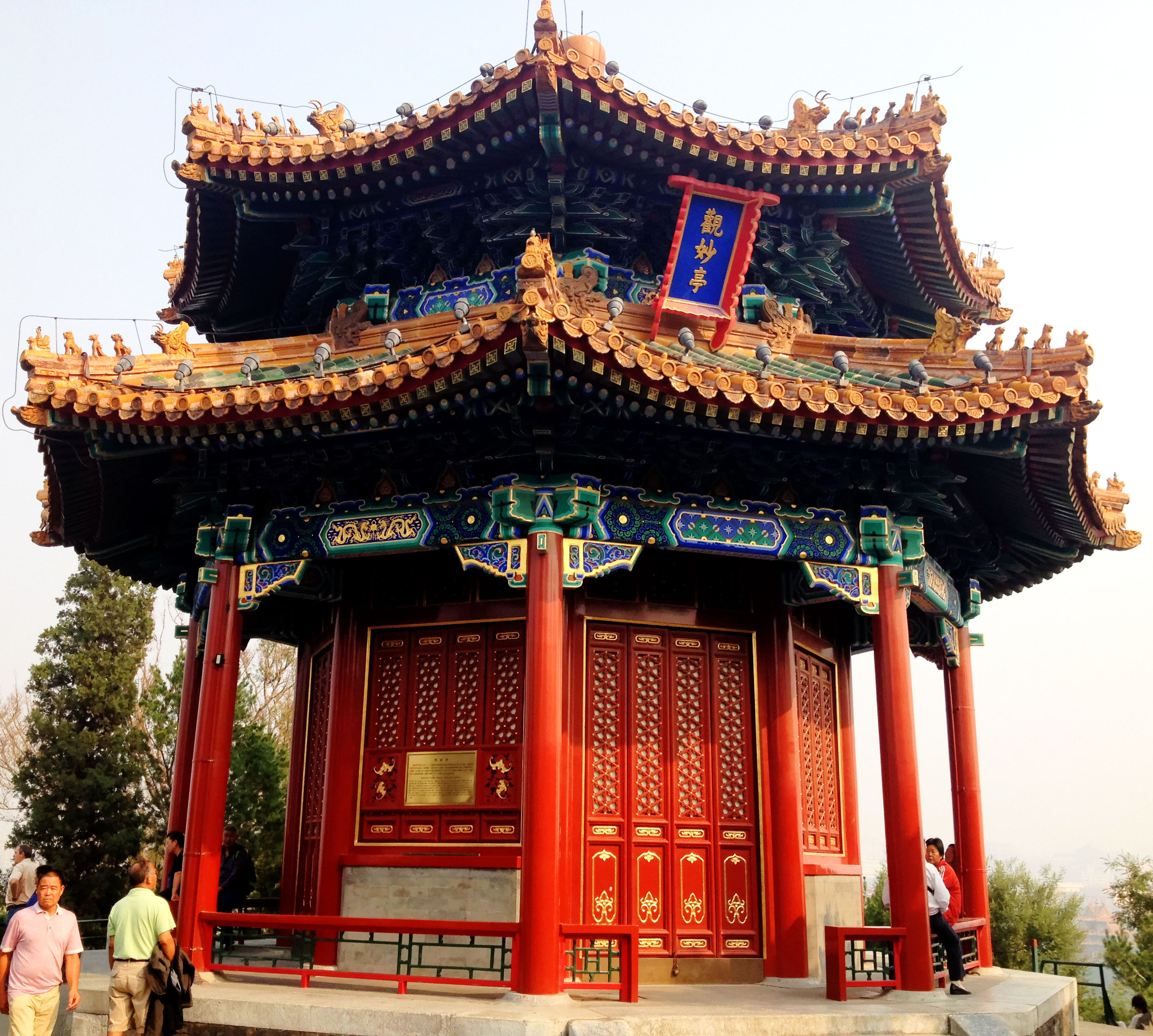
Guanmiao Pavilion (观妙亭)

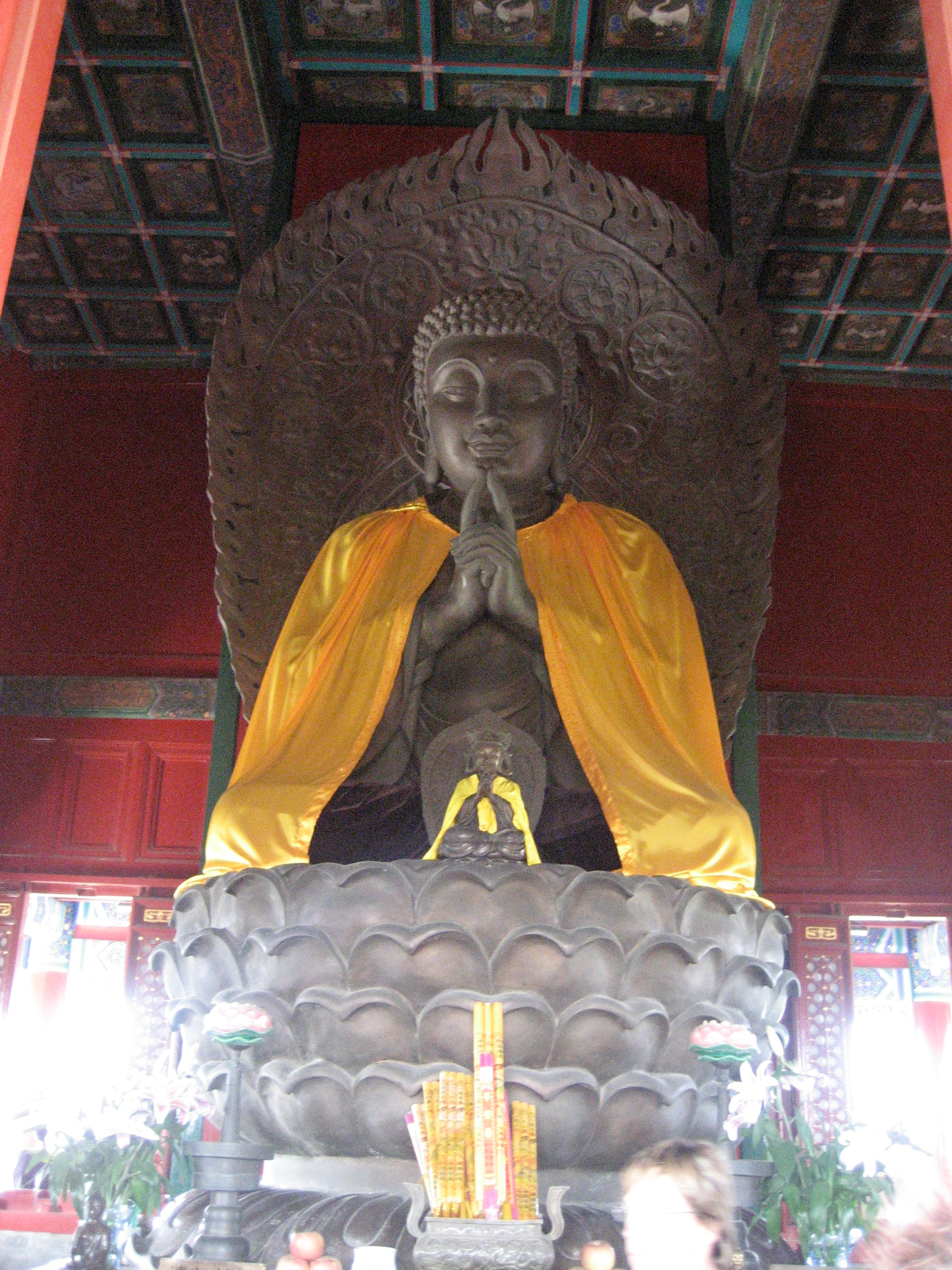
Vairocana Buddha statue in Wanchun Pavilion

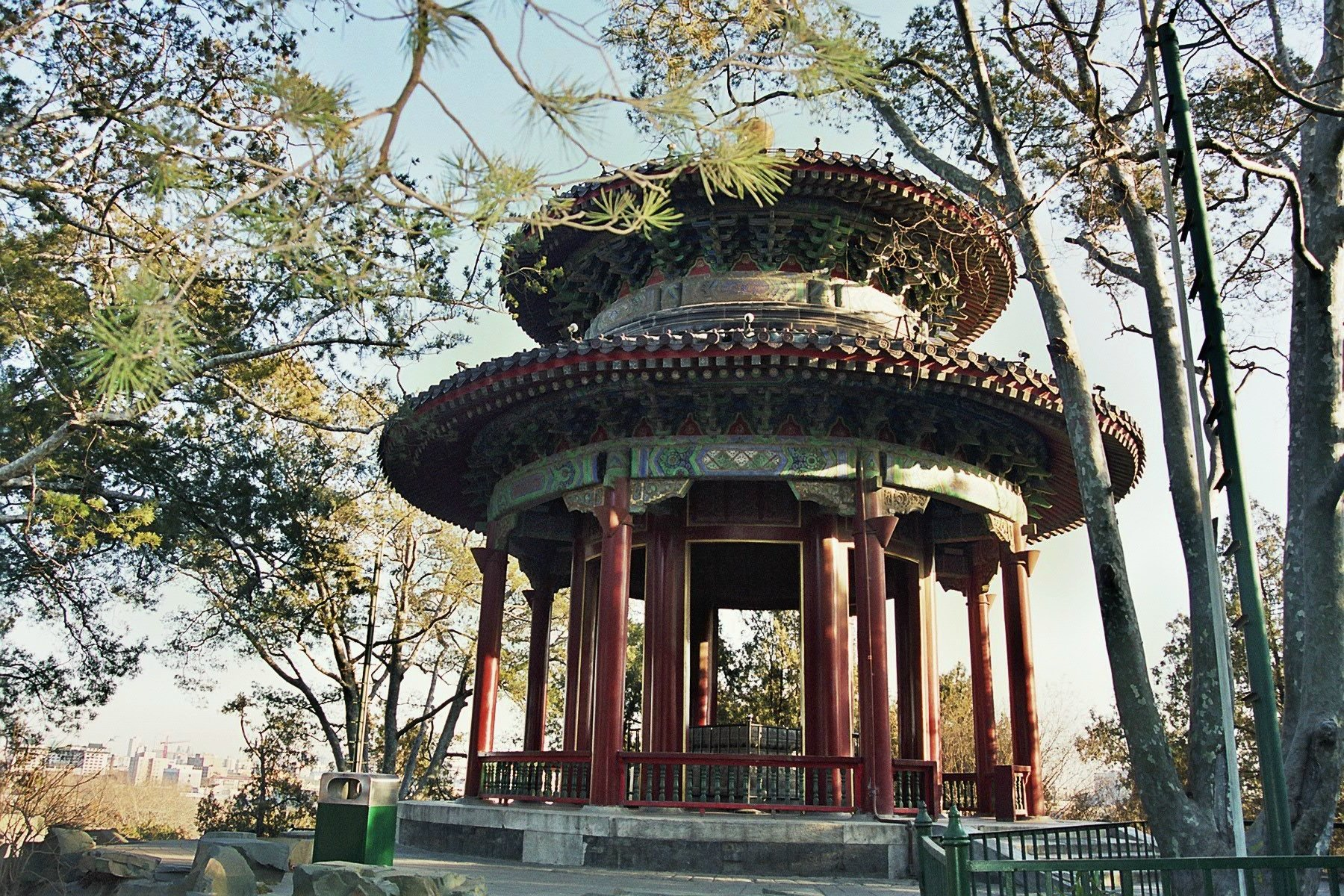
Zhoushang Pavilion (周赏亭)

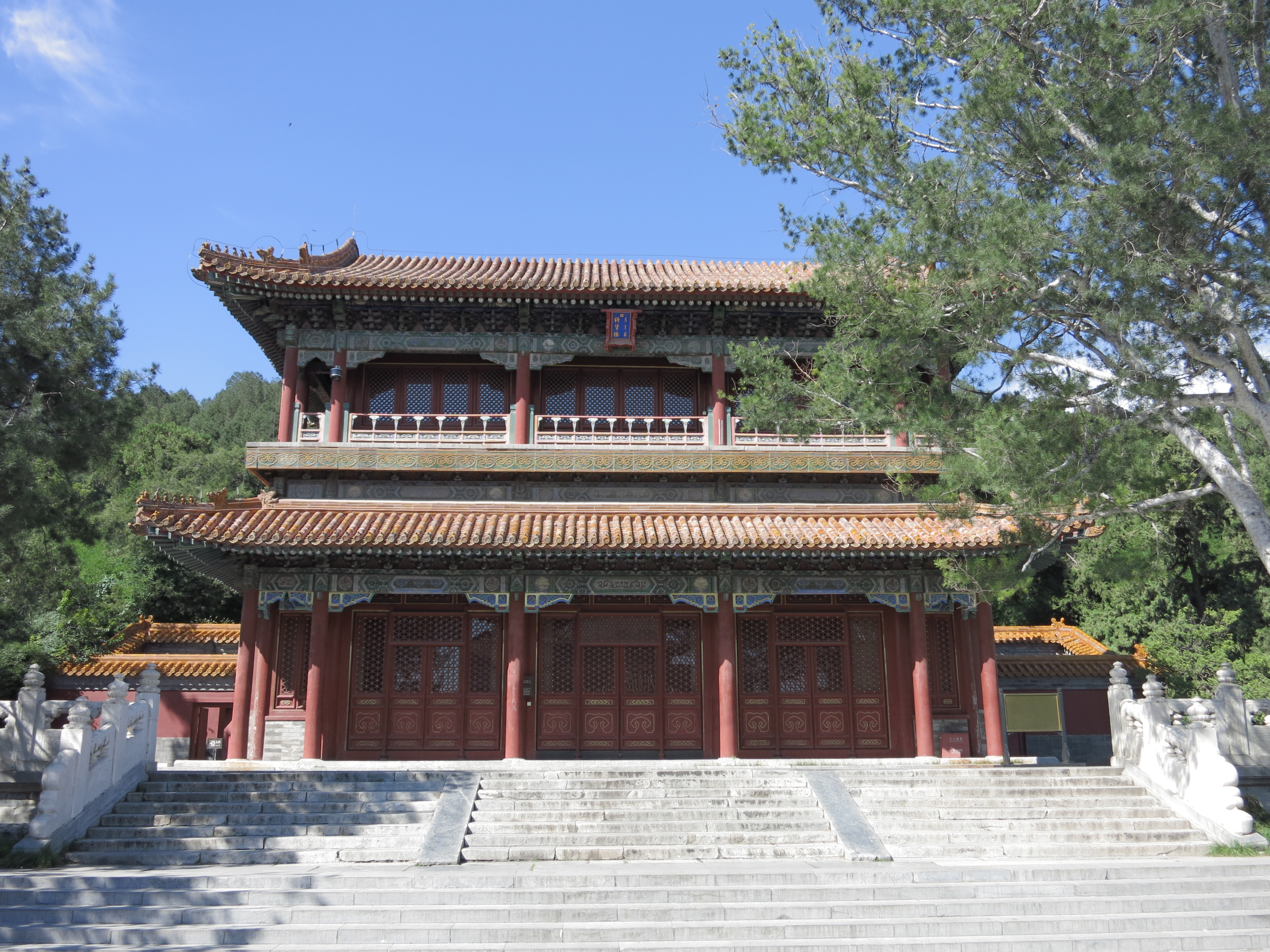
Yiwang Building (倚望楼)

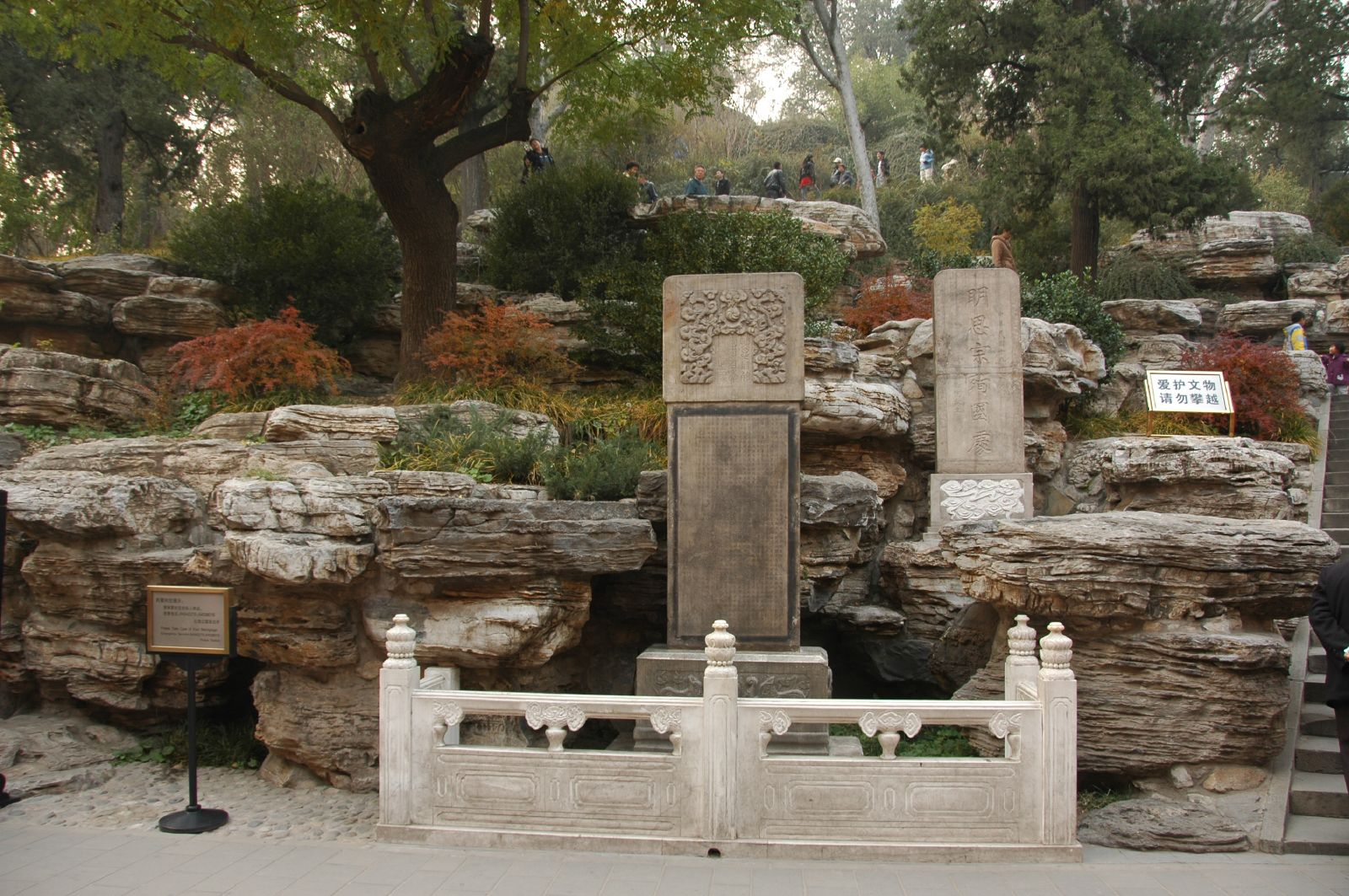
The place where Chongzhen Emperor of Ming dynasty committed suicide

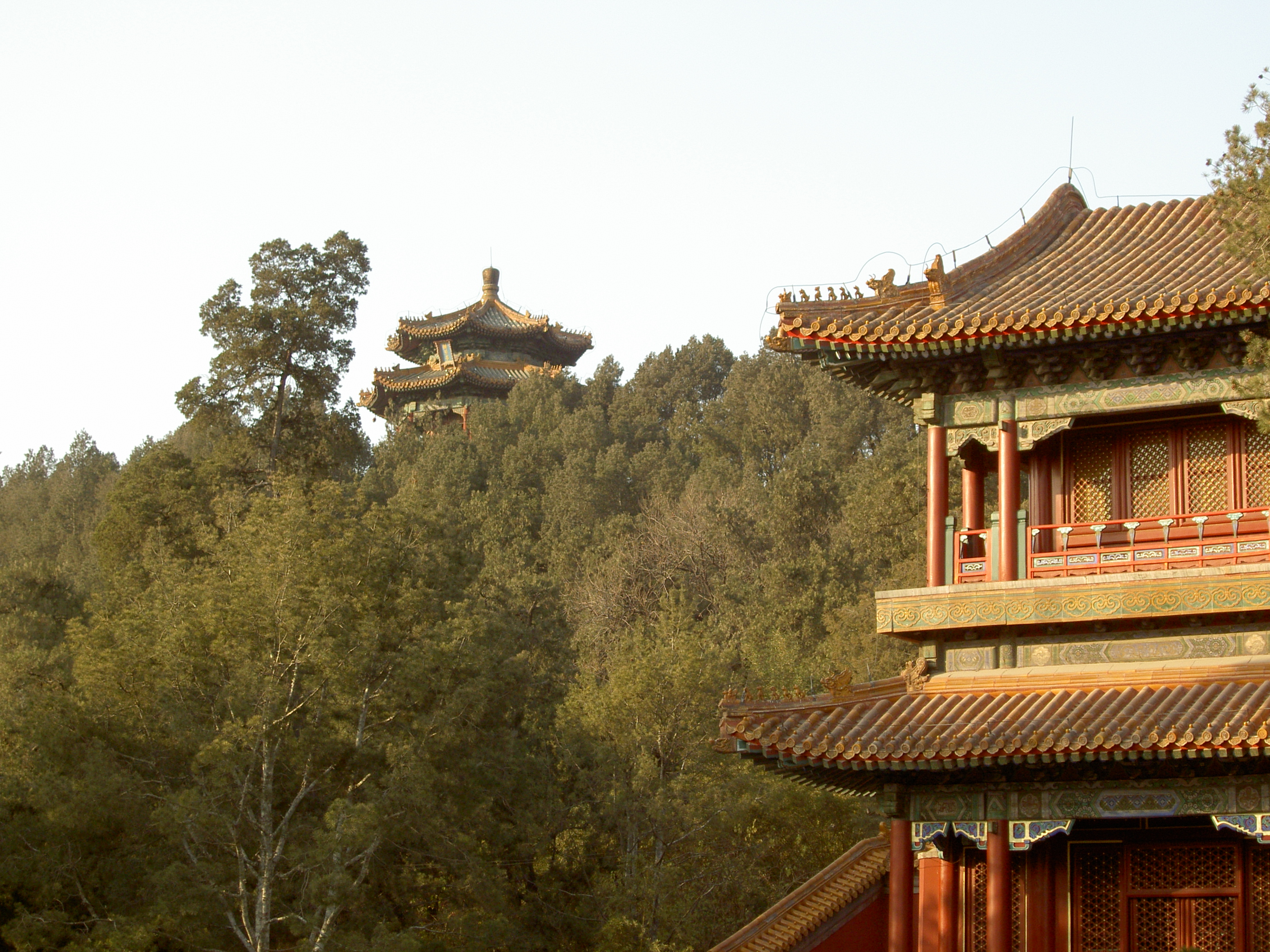
View of hilltop pavilion, 2005

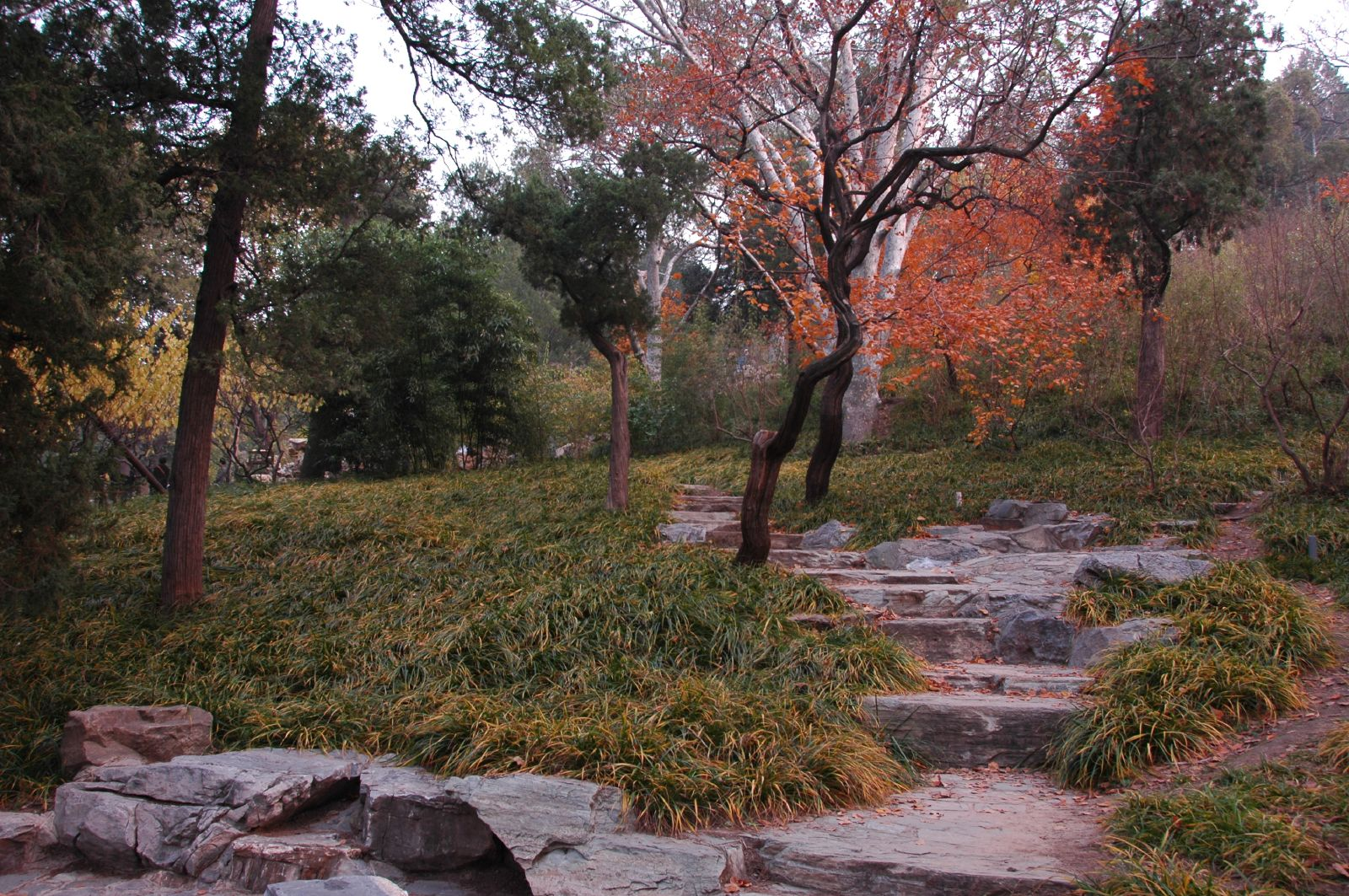
Jingshan in autumn, 2007

== See also ==
- Jingshan (disambiguation)
- Zuihuai
- Nine Altars and Eight Temples
- List of Beijing landmarks
- Zhongnanhai
- Summer Palace
- Old Summer Palace
