= Dafeng, Yancheng =

Coastal district in Jiangsu, China

Dafeng District 大丰区
- District
- Location in Jiangsu
- Coordinates: 33°14′56″N 120°33′43″E
- Country: People's Republic of China
- Province: Jiangsu
- Prefecture-level city: Yancheng

Area
  - Total: 3,059 km^{2} (1,181 sq mi)

Population (2020 census)
  - Total: 645,603
  - Density: 211.1/km^{2} (546.6/sq mi)
- Time zone: UTC+8 (China Standard)
- Postal code: 224100

Dafeng District (simplified Chinese: 大丰区; traditional Chinese: 大豐區; pinyin: Dàfēng Qū) is a coastal district in Yancheng, Jiangsu province, China. Located on the Jiangsu North Plain with a coastline of 112 km (70 mi), Dafeng was historically one of the largest salt-making areas in China and now is famed for its well preserved eco-system and numerous national conservation parks. The district has the largest national nature reserve for a rare deer species, Père David's Deer or Milu (麋鹿) in Chinese. It borders the prefecture-level city of Taizhou to the southwest.

The district nicknamed "the enclave of Shanghai" was a major destination for the sent-down youth from the city. Part of the county was put under Shanghai to establish a municipal farm since 1950, and there are still several farms and two prisons administered by Shanghai at present.

== History ==
Zhang Jian established Ts'ao-yen-ch'ang Ta-feng Salt&Cultivation Limited Company (Chinese: 草堰場大豐鹽墾股份有限公司; pinyin: Cǎoyànchǎng Dàfēng Yánkěn Gǔfèn Yǒuxiàn Gōngsī) in 1917, at Caoyan, a town of Dafeng nowadays. The northern Dongtai under the CPC became a separate county in 1942. The county was designated Taipei (臺北) for its location (north [pei] of Dongtai [abbreviated to tai]). Considering its namesake in Taiwan, it was renamed Dafeng, derived from Zhang's company in 1951.

== Geography, resources, and climate ==
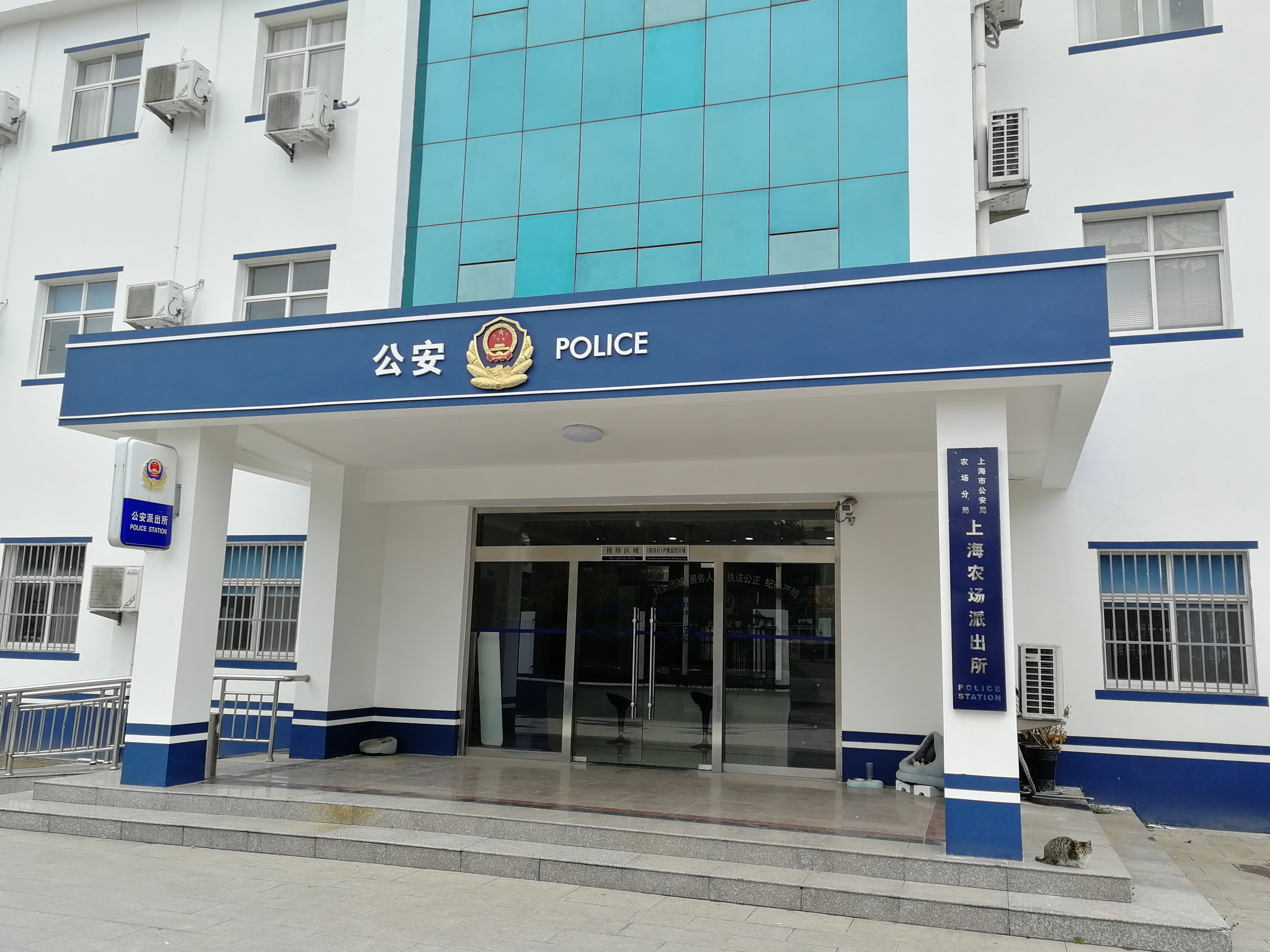
Shanghai Farm Police Station

Dafeng borders four counties including Dongtai, Sheyang, Yancheng and Xinghua. The county has a coastline of 112 km (70 mi) and a magnificent size of the wetland along its coastline, which is around near 800,000 hectares, sheltering enormous numbers of species of insects, fish, wild animals, and millions of migrating birds.

Upon the completion of Sutong Bridge, the district will significantly reduce the driving time to two hours to Shanghai and the south of Jiangsu.

Dafeng has a warm and wet subtropical climate and is influenced by the East Asian monsoon. It has distinct seasons and an abundant sunshine. The average annual temperature is close to 15 °C and the normal precipitation is over 1,000 mm yearly.

Climate data for Dafeng, elevation 3 m (9.8 ft), (1991–2020 normals, extremes 1981–present)
Month	Jan	Feb	Mar	Apr	May	Jun	Jul	Aug	Sep	Oct	Nov	Dec	Year
Record high °C (°F)	19.0 (66.2)	25.1 (77.2)	32.4 (90.3)	32.9 (91.2)	34.9 (94.8)	37.4 (99.3)	37.6 (99.7)	38.4 (101.1)	35.6 (96.1)	31.4 (88.5)	28.4 (83.1)	20.9 (69.6)	38.4 (101.1)
Mean daily maximum °C (°F)	6.5 (43.7)	8.7 (47.7)	13.3 (55.9)	19.5 (67.1)	24.8 (76.6)	28.0 (82.4)	31.1 (88.0)	30.6 (87.1)	26.9 (80.4)	22.1 (71.8)	15.9 (60.6)	9.1 (48.4)	19.7 (67.5)
Daily mean °C (°F)	2.0 (35.6)	3.8 (38.8)	8.0 (46.4)	13.7 (56.7)	19.2 (66.6)	23.2 (73.8)	27.0 (80.6)	26.7 (80.1)	22.5 (72.5)	16.8 (62.2)	10.6 (51.1)	4.2 (39.6)	14.8 (58.7)
Mean daily minimum °C (°F)	−1.5 (29.3)	0.1 (32.2)	3.8 (38.8)	8.9 (48.0)	14.5 (58.1)	19.5 (67.1)	23.8 (74.8)	23.7 (74.7)	18.9 (66.0)	12.4 (54.3)	6.2 (43.2)	0.4 (32.7)	10.9 (51.6)
Record low °C (°F)	−11.7 (10.9)	−11.2 (11.8)	−7.3 (18.9)	−2.3 (27.9)	3.7 (38.7)	10.6 (51.1)	16.6 (61.9)	16.3 (61.3)	9.1 (48.4)	0.8 (33.4)	−5.4 (22.3)	−9.6 (14.7)	−11.7 (10.9)
Average precipitation mm (inches)	36.2 (1.43)	34.7 (1.37)	60.3 (2.37)	55.0 (2.17)	83.9 (3.30)	146.6 (5.77)	245.7 (9.67)	204.6 (8.06)	89.7 (3.53)	53.2 (2.09)	56.3 (2.22)	30.5 (1.20)	1,096.7 (43.18)
Average precipitation days (≥ 0.1 mm)	6.9	7.5	8.4	8.1	9.4	10.0	13.2	12.2	8.6	7.1	7.7	6.2	105.3
Average snowy days	2.7	2.4	0.8	0	0	0	0	0	0	0	0.2	0.7	6.8
Average relative humidity (%)	75	76	76	75	76	80	84	84	81	78	77	74	78
Mean monthly sunshine hours	148.9	146.4	178.3	204.3	208.6	171.9	191.9	208.3	184.1	188.3	157.1	155.9	2,144
Percentage possible sunshine	47	47	48	52	48	40	44	51	50	54	51	51	49
Source: China Meteorological Administration

== Transport ==
- Yancheng Dafeng railway station

== Administrative divisions ==
At present, Dafeng District has 11 towns and 2 subdistricts.

11 Towns

- Sanlong (三龙镇)
- Xinfeng (新丰镇)
- Caoyan (草堰镇)
- Baiju (白驹镇)
- Liuzhuang (刘庄镇)
- Xituan (西团镇)
- Xiaohai (小海镇)
- Daqiao (大桥镇)
- Caomiao (草庙镇)
- Wanying (万盈镇)
- Nanyang (南阳镇)

2 Subdistricts

- Fenghua Subdistrict (丰华街道)
- Dazhong Subdistrict (大中街道)
