= Dafeng Milu Nature Reserve =

Nature reserve in Jiangsu, China

Coordinates: 32.984°N 120.81°E

Designations

Ramsar Wetland
- Official name: Dafeng National Nature Reserve
- Designated: 11 January 2002
- Reference no.: 1145

Dafeng Milu Nature Reserve is located in Dafeng, Jiangsu Province and near the Yellow Sea coast in eastern China, with the whole area 78000 ha, the core area 2668 ha, the buffer area 2220, and the experimental area 73112. The Geological landforms are typical coastal wetland, including tidal flats, seasonal stream and part of artificial wetland together with a lot of forest land, salt marsh, and bare land. The city of Dafeng belongs to subtropical and warm temperate zone, where thermophilic crops can grow well and influenced by the East Asian monsoon. The average annual temperature is 14.5 °C and the normal precipitation is over 750 mm per year.

== Milu’s Extinction in China ==
Milu is also known as Père David's deer or elaphure, a species of deer that is currently extinct in the wild. They are native to the subtropics of China, preferring marshland environment and grazing mainly on grass and aquatic plants. Early in Neolithic times, the milu's range extended across the majority of mainland China. Archaeologists have found milu antlers at settlements from the Liao River in the north to Jiangsu (including Dafeng) and Zhejiang Province and across the Yellow and Yangtze River Basins in Shaanxi and Hunan Province. However, in the late 19th century, there was only one herd belonged to Tongzhi, the Emperor of China and maintained in the Nanyuan Royal Hunting Garden. Then in 1900, the garden was occupied by German troops and some of the deer were shot and eaten by the German soldiers, some were illegally transported to Europe for exhibition and breeding.

== Characteristics of Dafeng Milu Nature Reserve ==
Dafeng Milu Nature Reserve is a second reintroduction of Milu into China in 1986 where 36 milu were chosen from five UK zoological gardens with the bulk of the deer coming from Whipsnade Wild Animal Park sponsored by National Forestry Department of China and World Wildlife Fund. It is an unpolluted wetland and has been recognized as a fabulous conservation land for Milu. In 2006, the population at this Nature Reserve had researched around 950 with an average annual population increases 17%. It is now the largest Milu Nature Reserve in the world, and in 1997 it was awarded as the National Nature Reserve in China. The reserve has been designated as a Ramsar site since 2002.

The Reserves have 14 species of animals, 182 species of birds, 27 reptiles and amphibian species, and more than 299 kinds of insects relying on the immense coastline and wetland, which is the paradise of the wildlife. The ecosystem of forest, grassland, water, deer and bird is being created in the Reserve and these species are living in a harmonious biological cycle. Milu have been listed as extinct in the wild, as all populations are under captive management. In Dafeng Nature Reserve, free-ranging projects have been put forward since 1986, after 10 years’ exploring, the free-ranging population has increased 13.2% by year and formed the herd of 118 free-ranging milu. Until 2013.9, the population has increased to 2027 in the Reserve.

== Tourism Destination ==
Since it was opened to the public as the tourism attraction, until now more than 1 million tourists have visited the Reserve and were educated for wildlife conservation and the importance of environmental protection. There are some tourism measures that meet the sustainable development:

- Fengshen Tower (water tower)

The water tower was constructed to memorize 39 milu coming back in 1986, which has the main function to storage water in order to resolve the water shortage problem in the Reserve. Tourist can also step onto the top of the tower to overview the Reserve.

- Deer viewing Platform

The Platform was the imitation of that in Nanyuan Royal Hunting Garden, which can facilitate the tourists to enjoy the sight of peaceful deer from a distance.

- The Tomb for 39 returning Milu

In order to memorize those 39 milu, the tomb was constructed for telling the history for tourists and informing the complexity of the range of deer become larger.

- Tourists Route

In order to protect Milu and other species, tourist can travel in the outer circle by golf car and observe them from a distance.
