= Jingshan =

Jingshan may refer to the following locations:

- The Jing Mountains (荊山), Hubei
- Jingshan, Hubei (京山市), county-level city of Jingmen, Hubei
- Jingshan Park (景山公园), in Beijing
- Beijing Jingshan School, in Beijing
- Beijing–Shanhaiguan railway, or Jingshan railway (京山铁路), railway from Beijing to Shanhaiguan, Hebei

Subdistricts

- Jingshan Subdistrict, Wuhu (荆山街道), subdivision of Jinghu District, Wuhu, Anhui
- Jingshan Subdistrict, Nanchang (京山街道), subdivision of Qingyunpu District, Nanchang, Jiangxi

Written as "景山街道":

- Jingshan Subdistrict, Beijing, subdivision of Dongcheng District, Beijing
- Jingshan Subdistrict, Wenzhou, subdivision of Ouhai District, Wenzhou, Zhejiang

Towns

- Jingshan, Jilin (景山镇), subdivision of Jingyu County, Jilin
- Jingshan, Hangzhou (径山镇), subdivision of Yuhang District, Hangzhou, Zhejiang
