= Baiju, Jiangsu =

Baiju 白驹镇
- Town
- Location in Jiangsu
- Coordinates: 33°3′55″N 120°18′29″E
- Country: People's Republic of China
- Province: Jiangsu
- Prefecture-level city: Yancheng
- District: Dafeng District
- Time zone: UTC+8 (China Standard)

Baiju (simplified Chinese: 白驹; traditional Chinese: 白駒; pinyin: Báijū) is a town in Dafeng District, Yancheng, Jiangsu province, China. As of 2020, it administers Haining Residential District (海宁) and the following 16 villages:

- Yandi Village (沿堤村)
- Majia Village (马家村)
- Minyao Village (民窑村)
- Qiliqiao Village (七里桥村)
- Tuanjie Village (团结村)
- Sanlishu Village (三里树村)
- Shizikou Village (狮子口村)
- Tangshe Village (汤舍村)
- Tangxi Village (唐西村)
- Xiao'ao Village (肖坳村)
- Jinbu Village (进步村)
- Xinduo Village (新垛村)
- Zhushe Village (朱舍村)
- Dongyao Village (东窑村)
- Yaogang Village (窑港村)
- Yangxin Village (洋心村)

== See also ==
- List of township-level divisions of Jiangsu
