= Nanjing baiju =

Baiju
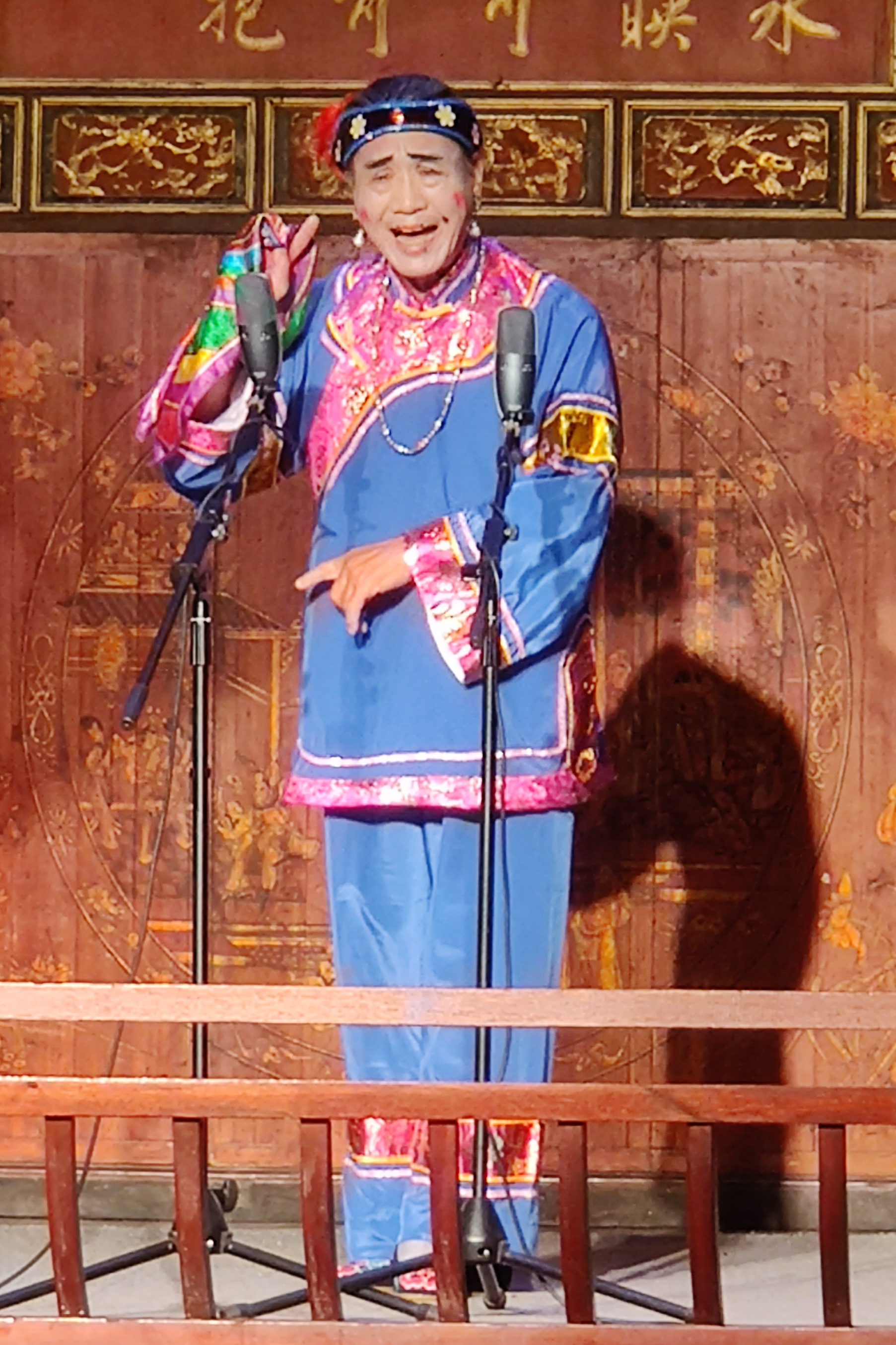
- Baiju in Nanjing, 2019
- Other names: Baiqu
- Origin: Yuan dynasty
- Major region: Nanjing
- Typical instruments: Pipa, erhu, sanxian, dizi, and guban
- Topolect: Nanjing dialect

Baiju
- Chinese: 白局
- Literal meaning: Free show
Transcriptions
Standard Mandarin
- Hanyu Pinyin: bái jú

Baiqu
- Chinese: 百曲
- Literal meaning: Hundred tunes
Transcriptions
Standard Mandarin
- Hanyu Pinyin: bǎi qǔ

Baiju (Chinese: 白局) or Nanjing baiju, also called baiqu (Chinese: 百曲), is a traditional type of Chinese singing-storytelling and a form of quyi, formed in the rural Luhe District in the city of Nanjing during the Yuan dynasty more than 600 years ago. Though belittled by the upper class, baiju was very popular among the lower classes. It is also the only kind of old local opera in Nanjing, known as a native art which includes singing and telling in the Nanjing dialect, and is particularly rich in rhyme. Baiju is often performed in the form of a solo monologue or a dialogue, like xiangsheng (a traditional Chinese oral art). When acted, it needs from two to five performers. It is very easy to understand, with strong local characteristics, but unfortunately, due to the decline of both performers and audiences, the prospects for baiju are not optimistic. The origin of its name is performers not receiving any pay for their show ("bai" here means "free", and "ju" means " a show").

== History ==
Baiju has a history of over 600 years, although its earliest performers and tunes are untraceable now. Baiju originated between the end of the Ming dynasty and the beginning of the Qing dynasty, like other folk arts in China which were ignored by the ruling class and literary men. The earliest known of baiju is mentioned in a book by Li Dou (李鬥; a Qing dynasty drama writer), A Record of Yangzhou Gaily-Painted Pleasure-Boats (揚州畫舫錄). The book mentions a labelled tune of Yangzhou (揚州清曲), named the "Nanjing Tune" (南京調), which was becoming more and more popular. This "Nanjing Tune" was one tune label in baiju then, and it is still a basic tune label in baiju today.

Baiju was transmitted only by the laboring people. It started from workers in brocade workshops. As a derivative of cloud-pattern brocade, the entertainment during breaks in work at the cloud-pattern brocade loom rooms marked the beginning of the baiju art. The brocade workers lived a painful life. It is a complex and monotonous job to weave cloud-pattern brocades, and a journeyman must spend years to finish one. Due to Nanjing's climate, cold in winter and hot in summer, the workers labored in harsh conditions for low pay. To divert themselves from the monotony of their jobs, workers started singing popular ditties, which developed into baiju. At that time, these workers sang about history, folktales and social news, to the tunes of Ming and Qing dynasty folk songs.

Another folk art form in Nanjing called "hongju" (紅局) had a close relationship with baiju. Associated with the fact that baiju was becoming more and more popular among the citizens, and that many cloud-pattern brocade workers lost their jobs in the low season, some of them changed their careers. They sang tunes which were sung in the loom rooms before asking for monetary reward, and the same tunes they sang there were called "hongju". Therefore, researchers consider these two labelled tunes as the same art form.

== Artistic characteristics ==
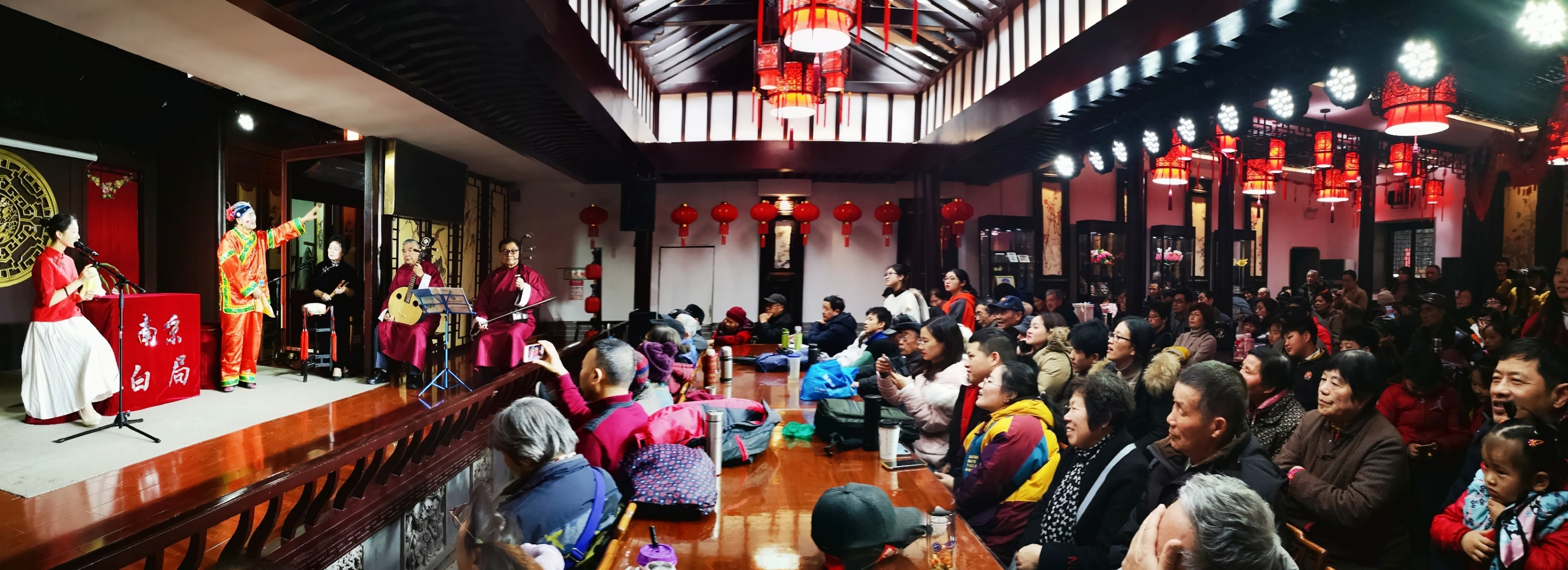
A baiju performance in Nanjing, 2019.

Baiju is the most important folk art form in the Nanjing region at present, which features singing in the form of the typical Nanjing dialect. It has many local characteristics that are subordinate to the language, on the premise that languages obey their contents. Performers sing baiju by the typical Nanjing dialect, on the basis of the Nanjing public language. The basic structure of the libretto, the processing of each rhythm, and the singing form are all in close connection with the language law of the Nanjing dialect.

The second feature of baiju is that it can sing the news to reflect a major societal event in a timely manner. In the old days, workers who made yunjin worked all day without other activities. In order to divert themselves from boredom they echoed each other in their native language about the news of the day. This way of talking and singing news spread fast, was easy to understand (unlike the official press as written, which is not easy to accept), with strong time (as long as we compile what happened, we can immediately sing). These news scripts criticize the current social evils sharply and had a far effect. They have become unique tracks of baiju. The pieces reflect the significant events in a timely manner, plus with simple music, humor and vivid language, so are welcomed by the Nanjing normal people.

== Cultural values ==
- A reflection of Nanjing dialect's quintessence: Experts can find valuable research materials from baiju so that they can push on the study in Nanjing local language and ancient Chinese language. Nanjing local language stems from two parts: one is ancient Chinese vernacular, the other was labor people. In baiju plays, words' pronunciations are in accordance with languages which are mentioned above.
- Reproduction of local peoples' real life: Most of these plays retain a large sum of customs and conditions of the people at that time. Some tracks sing the praises of happiness and luckiness. Some are concerned with folk and history stories. Some show the beauty of landscape. Some reflected important news during those days.
- During the course of transmission, baiju was affected by Yangzhou melody and Ming and Qing dynasty folk songs. Finally, baiju formed with unique characteristics.
- Inspiration in contemporary education: In the globalization times, many countries had paid attention to the development of national culture. Some people may regard baiju as low-grade music, while this kind of opinion is contrary to culture diversification. Only when we look back on the local music can we understand the true value of local culture.

== Development ==
The development of Nanjing baiju depended on the brocade industry in Nanjing. Over 30,000 brocade looms were in Nanjing in the Qing dynasty, through the reigns of the Kangxi, Yongzheng and Qianlong emperors. Because of the weavers' cooperation, many baiju tunes became widely popular among them, such as "Picking Immortal Peaches".

Baiju became a totally theatrical form which possesses narratives, talking, singing, characters and a number of tune names. Zhang Yuanfa was an aged Yun brocade artist who was born during the reign of the Guangxu Emperor. According to his utterance, baiju performance was held in Han Mansion. His father said it would also be held at Ullambana as a Buddhist festival. During this festival, Taiping Heavenly Kingdom held a ceremony for soldiers in its capital, Tianjing.

Baiju was prevalent at Ullambana during the reign of the Guangxu Emperor. It created stories based on social news and big events.

== Recent times ==
Xu Chunhua is a Nanjing dialogue teacher from the film The Flowers of War directed by Zhang Yimou. She has established the group of Nanjing baiju in Nanjing Normal University, which has drawn great attention by the media. From her point of view, this cultural heritage must not only protected but also developed and recreated. This must be done by the young people. The aim of the group is to keep the initial feeling of baiju. "It's pretty popular between college students," she said, "Because they are accustomed to rock and roll and such things, when given a new way to treat the ancient culture, they feel really good."
