= Vè =

Vè (chữ Nôm: 噅) or Đồng dao (chữ Hán: 童謠) is a poetic and song form for children, most typical of Vietnam.

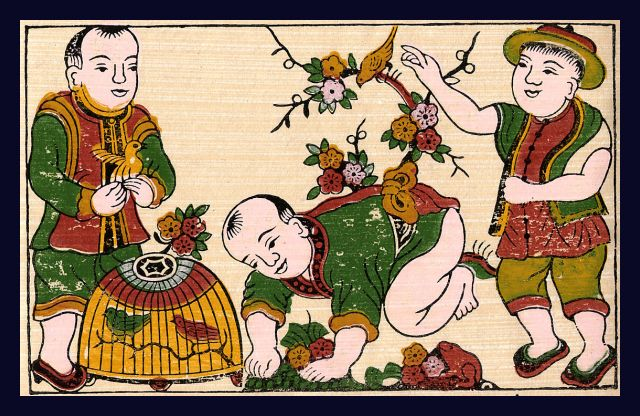

== History ==
It is used primarily in satirical poems, and is also performed with the accompaniment of percussion instruments. It is often used to make humorous observations about a certain topic, as a form of social criticism.

A vè poem or song consists of rhyming couplets, in which the final syllable of every other row rhymes with the final syllable in the next row. The rhyme scheme (Vietnamese: Nhịp đuổi) is therefore :

1. xxxa
2. xxxb
3. xxxb
4. xxxc
5. xxxc
6. xxxd

etc.

The following is an example of vè, in which the words that rhyme are highlighted. Some examples:

Tri tri trình trình Cái đinh nổ lửa Con ngựa đứt cương Tam vương ngũ đế Cấp kế đi tìm Ù à ù ập Ngồi sập xuống đây	Trọc gì ? Trọc đầu. Đầu gì ? Đầu tàu. Tàu gì ? Tàu hỏa. Hỏa gì ? Hỏa tốc. Tốc gì ? Tốc hành. Hành gì ? Hành củ. Củ gì ? Củ khoai. Khoai gì ? Khoai lang. Lang gì ? Lang trọc. Trọc gì ? Trọc đầu.	Bao giờ cho đến tháng ba, Ếch cắn cổ rắn tha ra ngoài đồng. Hùm nằm cho lợn liếm lông, Một chục quả hồng nuốt lão tám mươi. Nằm xôi nuốt trẻ lên mười, Con gà be rượu nuốt người lao đao Lươn nằm cho trúm bò vào, Một đàn cào cào đuổi bắt cá rô. Lúa mạ nhảy lên ăn bò, Cỏ năng cỏ lác rình mò bắt trâu. Gà con đuổi bắt diều hâu, Chim ri đuổi đánh vỡ đầu bồ nông.	Bà chằng lửa Sửa cầu tiêu Ba giờ chiều Đứt dây thiều Lọt cầu tiêu Ăn bún riêu Nhớ người yêu	Ve vẻ vè ve Nghe vè lá lốt Anh Kiên cũng tốt Chị Thơm cũng xinh Hai bên xập xình Gia đình đồng ý Đi ra đăng kí Ủy ban không cho Không cho cứ lấy Tôi yêu cô ấy Đã mấy năm rồi Chẳng nói lôi thôi Ngày mai cứ cưới Ai thích thì đi Khi qua đầu cầu Đánh rơi nải chuối Cô dâu chết đuối Chú rể khóc nhè Cô dâu vào bếp Ăn vụng cơm nếp Chú rể vào bếp Cháy hết cả râu
Củ cà rốt Đốt cháy nhà Ông cụ già Kêu oai oái Nhắn con gái Lái ô tô Lên thủ đô Thăm bác Hồ; Bác Hồ bảo	Thằng cu Tí; Đi chăn trâu Ăn quả dâu Bị đau bụng Bố nó đánh Mẹ nó can	Ông công an Đến giải quyết Tôi không biết Chuyện gia đình Chát xình xình	Bố thằng Bình; Đi Liên Xô; Trúng xổ số Được triệu hai Mua cái đài Còn triệu mốt	Mua cà rốt Còn năm trăm Mua dao găm Còn năm chục Mua súng lục Còn năm xu Mua thằng cu Về nhắm rượu

== Culture ==
Song Defense of the fortress (Trấn thủ lưu đồn) by oral folks :

- Paragraph 1 : Time of departure

Ngang lưng thì thắt bao vàng,
Đầu đội nón đấu, vai mang súng dài.
Một tay thì cắp hỏa mai,
Một tay cắp giáo, quan sai xuống thuyền.
Thùng thùng trống đánh ngũ liên,
Bước chân xuống thuyền nước mắt như mưa.

- Paragraph 2 : Time of quarter

(chữ Hán); Tam thập niên trấn thủ Lưu Đồn, Nhật tuần điếm, dạ hành sự quan. Trảm trúc, cứ mộc thượng lâm, Hữu thân, hữu khổ bình đàm đồng ai. Khẩu thực duẩn trúc, duẩn mai, Chư mai, chư trúc dĩ ai hữu bằng. Thủy tỉnh trạm ngư đắc cung thân thượng hạ hoành.	(chữ Nôm A); Ba năm trấn thủ lưu đồn, Ngày thì canh điếm tối dồn việc quan. Chém tre đẵn gỗ trên ngàn, Hữu thân hữu khổ phàn nàn cùng ai. Miệng ăn măng trúc măng mai, Những giang cùng nứa lấy ai bạn cùng. Nước giếng trong con cá nó vẫy vùng.	(chữ Nôm B); Ba-mươi năm trấn-thủ lưu-đồn, Ngày thì canh điếm tối dồn việc quan. Chém tre đẵn gỗ trên ngàn, Có thân có khổ nói-bàn cùng ai. Miệng ăn măng-trúc măng-mai, Những giang cùng nứa lấy ai bạn cùng. Nước giếng trong con cá nó vẫy-vùng.

Song Defense of the fortress by Phạm Duy :

[P. 1] Đất ngài đây thanh lịch Đất có hữu tình Có đường vô sảnh tới dinh quan lưu đồn Ba năm bác còn đương trấn thủ Tình dẫu cái mà tình ơi	[P. 2] Trấn thủ lưu đồn, ngày thời canh điếm, sớm tối dồn việc quan Anh chém cành tre còn như ngả gỗ Tình dẫu mà tình ơi Ngả gỗ trên ngàn, than thân rằng khổ, biết phàn nàn cùng ai Anh hãy phàn nàn những trúc cùng mai Có cái cây măng nứa, có cái cây ngô đồng
[P. 3] Xót xót xa còn như muối đổ Tình dẫu mà tình ơi Muối đổ trong lòng, đồ ăn kham khổ, biết lấy gì làm ngon Kìa mi khoe còn như mi đẹp Tình dẫu mà tình ơi Mi đẹp mi ròn, so cái bề nhan sắc, mi hãy còn kém xa	[P. 4] Thì anh muốn cho còn như đó vợ Tình dẫu mà tình ơi Đó vợ đây chồng Đó bế con gái để tôi tôi bồng con trai Kìa con xinh còn như vợ đẹp Tình dẫu mà tình ơi Vợ đẹp nhất ở trên đời

== See also ==
- Vietnamese literature
