= Quyi =

Umbrella term for regional genres of Chinese oral performing arts

- Traditional Chinese: 曲藝
- Simplified Chinese: 曲艺
- Literal meaning: melody art
Transcriptions
Standard Mandarin
- Hanyu Pinyin: qǔyì
- Yale Romanization: chyǔ-yì

Shuochang yishu
- Traditional Chinese: 說唱藝術
- Simplified Chinese: 说唱艺术
- Literal meaning: speak sing art
Transcriptions
Standard Mandarin
- Hanyu Pinyin: shuōchàng yìshù
- Yale Romanization: shwō-chàng yì-shù

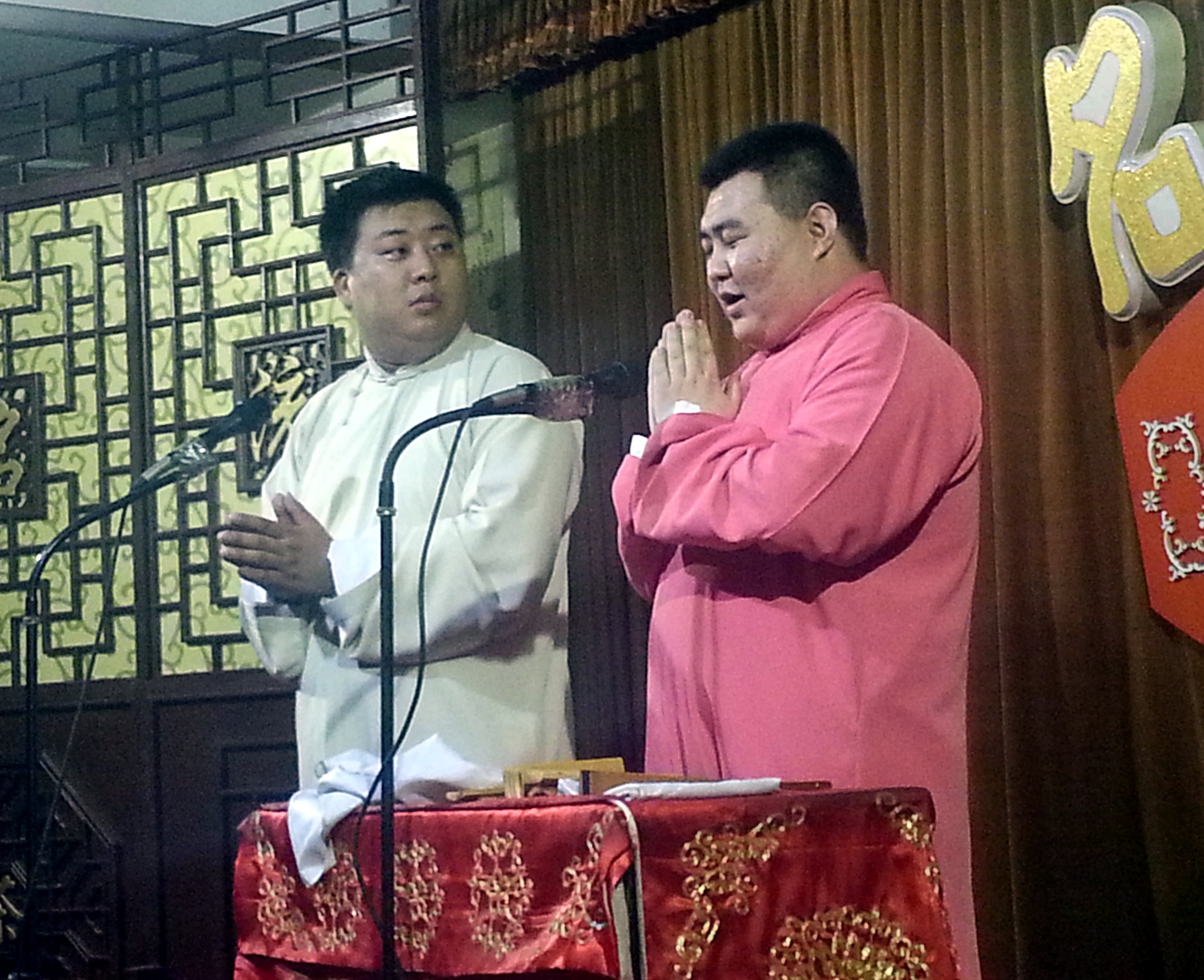
Xiangsheng

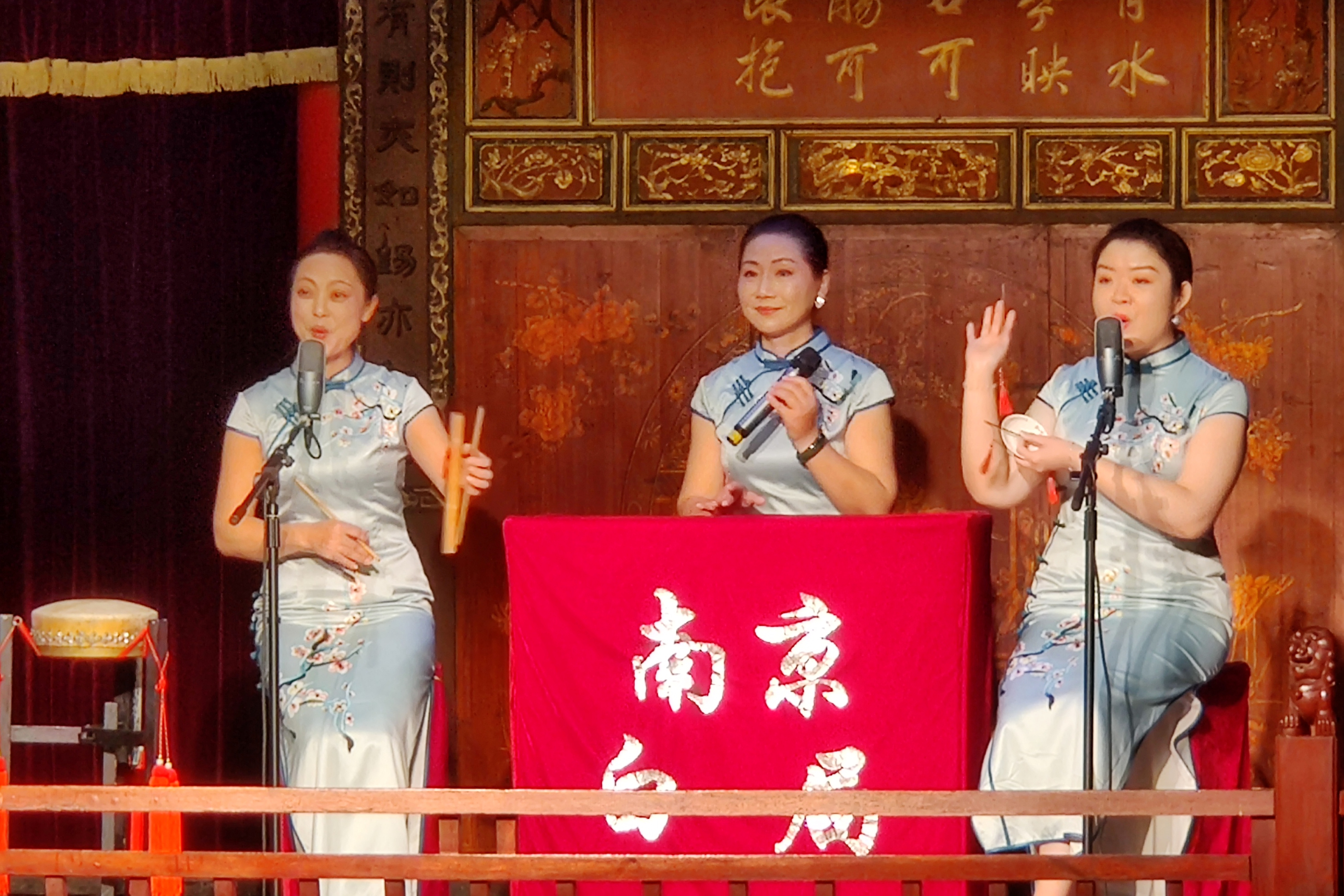
Nanjing baiju

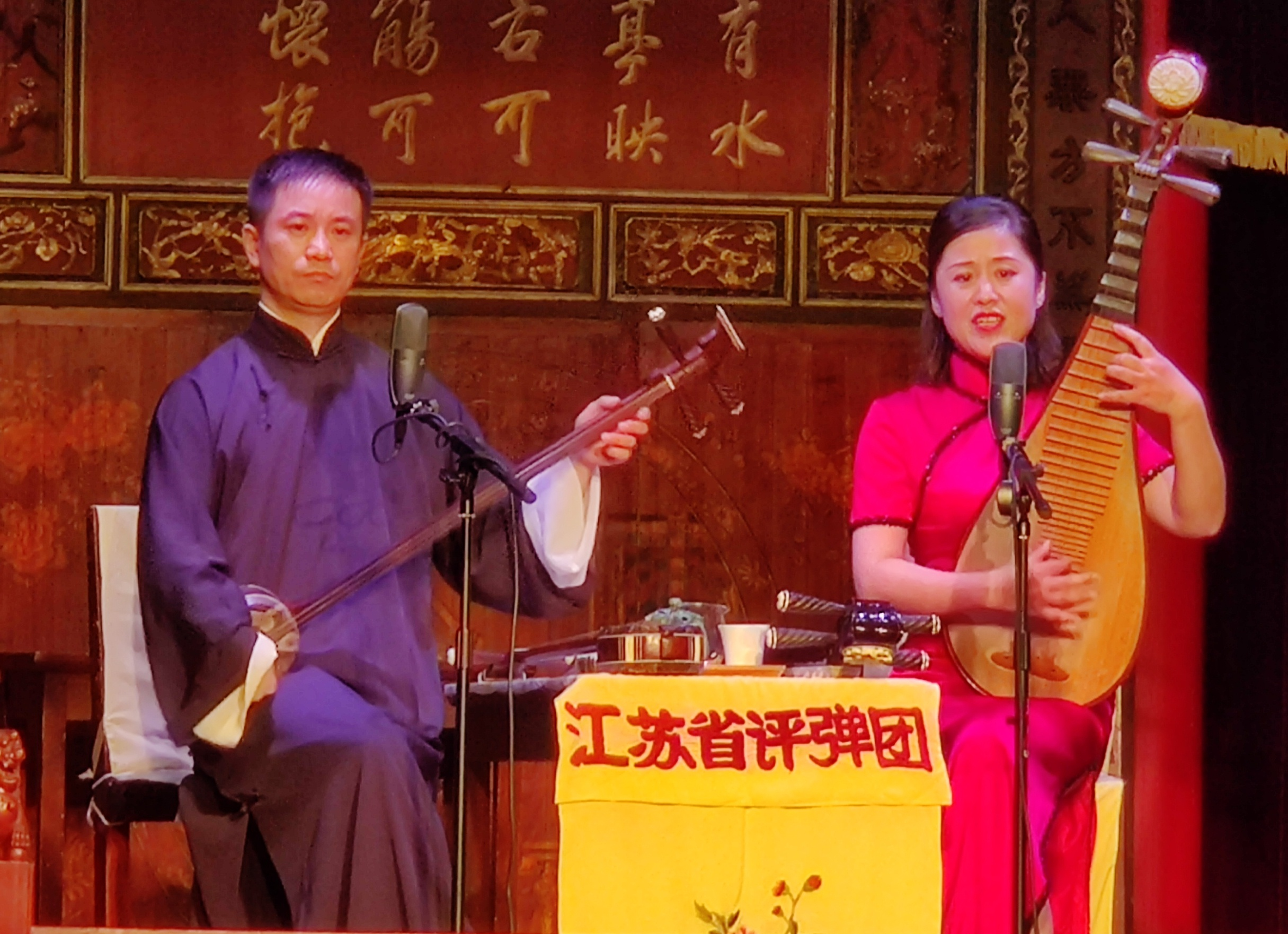
Suzhou pingtan

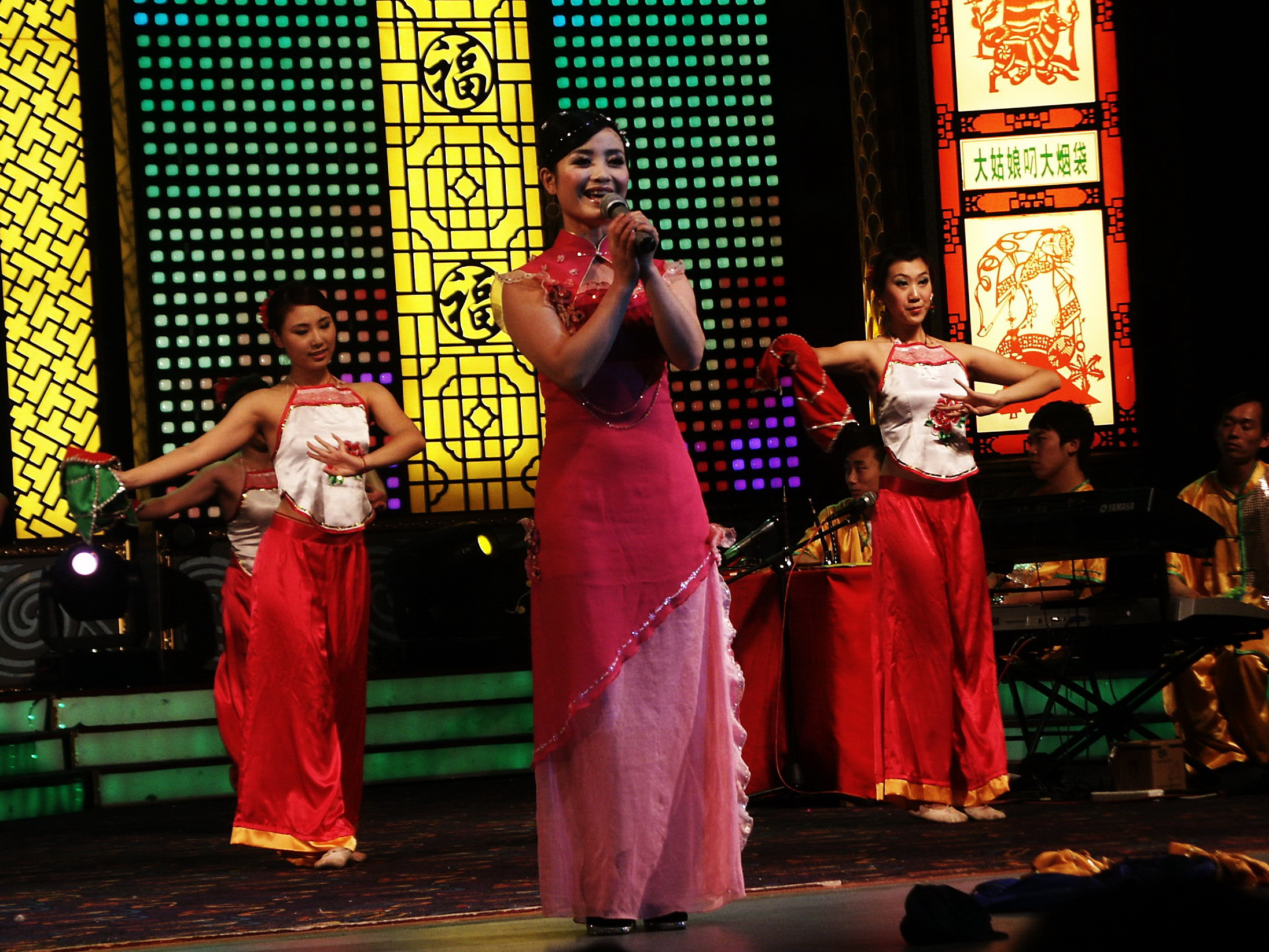
Errenzhuan

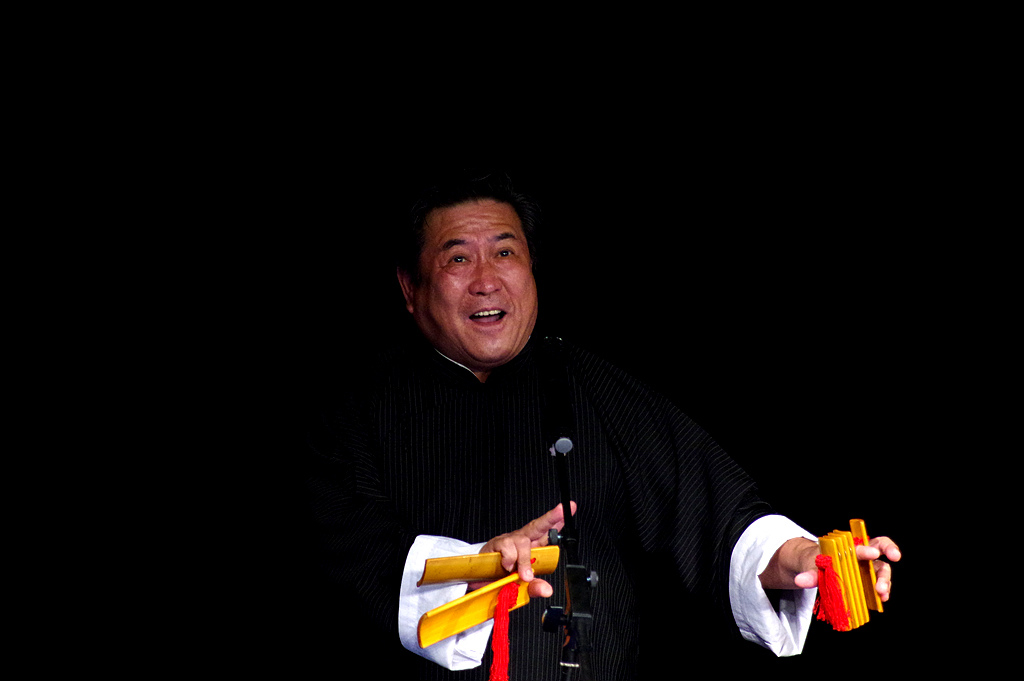
Kuaibanshu

Quyi ("melodious art") and shuochang yishu ("speaking and singing art") are umbrella terms for over 300 regional genres of traditional Chinese oral performing arts. Quyi is distinguished from xiqu (Chinese opera) by its emphasis on narration, as opposed to acting, although they share many elements including the same traditional stories. Quyi artists generally wear no to little makeup. Musical instruments like drums, wooden clappers, pipa, yangqin, or sanxian are commonly seen in quyi, as are hand fans.

== History ==
While the storytelling art concept has been around for centuries, the narrative art concept was mostly recognized in the 1920s. Only after 1949 with the founding of the People's Republic of China did the term quyi become widely used. Prior to this, it was just classified as shuochang yishu. This is one of the art category that gained momentum since the New Culture Movement. With the exception of the Cultural Revolution period, a great number of stories written for this art are preserved.

== Presentation ==
The story is usually told by a small number of people. The most standard number is one or two, sometimes extending to four or more. Quyi is often accompanied by clappers, drums, or stringed instruments, with the presenter wearing costumes at times. Unlike Chinese operas which has a fixed style for costume, quyi costumes vary depending on the era of the story plot. Costumes range from dynastic period hanfu to the more modern qipao or even suits.

The language used is usually associated with the spoken dialect of the local area. Sometimes it uses rhymed verse, sometimes in prose, and sometimes a combination. A lot of body movements may be used in the portrayal of the characters in the story. Each person may play multiple roles for multiple characters in the story. It is also this local and regional feel for the art that some would classify it as Chinese folk art.

== Regions ==
Outside of mainland China, this entertainment form is also found in Taiwan.

== Varieties ==
- Baiju (白局) - Nanjing
- Dagu (大鼓)
  - Jingdong dagu (京东大鼓) – Tianjin
  - Jingyun dagu (京韵大鼓)
  - Xihe Dagu (西河大鼓)
- Danxian (单弦) – Beijing zh
- Kuaiban (快板)
- Lianhualao (莲花落) – Taiyuan, Shanxi
- Pinghua (评话)
- Pingshu (评书)
- Pingtan (评弹)
- Shuoshu (说书)
- Tanci (弹词)
- Xiangsheng (相声)
- Xiangshu (相書)
- Yangzhou pinghua (扬州评话) – Yangzhou, Jiangsu
- Zhuizi – Henan
Suzhou Pingtan sample
