= Village (China) =

Lowest level subdivision in China

formally Village-level divisions

Chinese name
- Simplified Chinese: 村级行政区
- Traditional Chinese: 村級行政區
Transcriptions
Standard Mandarin
- Hanyu Pinyin: Cūn Jí Xíngzhèngqū

Alternative Chinese name
- Chinese: 村
Transcriptions
Standard Mandarin
- Hanyu Pinyin: Cūn

Second alternative Chinese name
- Chinese: 嘎查
Transcriptions
Standard Mandarin
- Hanyu Pinyin: Gāchá

Tibetan name
- Tibetan: གྲོང་ཚོ
Transcriptions
- Wylie: grong tsho
- Tibetan Pinyin: Chongco

Zhuang name
- Zhuang: Cunh

Mongolian name
- Mongolian Cyrillic: тосгон (typical villages, 村) гацаа (gatsaa) translate as Gaqa (嘎查)
- Mongolian script: ᠲᠣᠰᠬᠣᠨ ᠭᠠᠴᠠᠭ᠎ᠠ
Transcriptions
- SASM/GNC: tosgon gaqaa

Uyghur name
- Uyghur: كەنت
Transcriptions
- Latin Yëziqi: kent

Kazakh name
- Kazakh: قىستاق қыстақ qıstaq

Kyrgyz name
- Kyrgyz: قىشتاق кыштак kıştak

Villages (Chinese: 村; pinyin: Cūn), formally village-level divisions (村级行政区; Cūn Jí Xíngzhèngqū) in China, serve as a fundamental organizational unit for its rural population (census, mail system). Basic local divisions like neighborhoods and communities are not informal, but have defined boundaries and designated heads (one per area). In 2000, China's densely populated villages (>100 persons/square km) had a population greater than 500 million and covered more than 2 million square kilometers, or more than 20% of China's total area. By 2020, all incorporated villages (with proper conditions making it possible) had road access, the last village to be connected being a remote village in Sichuan province's Butuo County.

== Types of villages ==
=== Urban ===
- Residential community (simplified Chinese: 社区; traditional Chinese: 社區; pinyin: shèqū)
  - Residents' committee (simplified Chinese: 居民委员会; traditional Chinese: 居民委員會; pinyin: jūmín wěiyuánhuì)
    - Residential groups (simplified Chinese: 居民小组; traditional Chinese: 居民小組; pinyin: jūmín xiǎozǔ

Note
Urban village (Chinese: 城中村; pinyin: chéngzhōngcūn) one that spontaneously and naturally exists within urban area, which is not an administrative division.

=== Rural ===
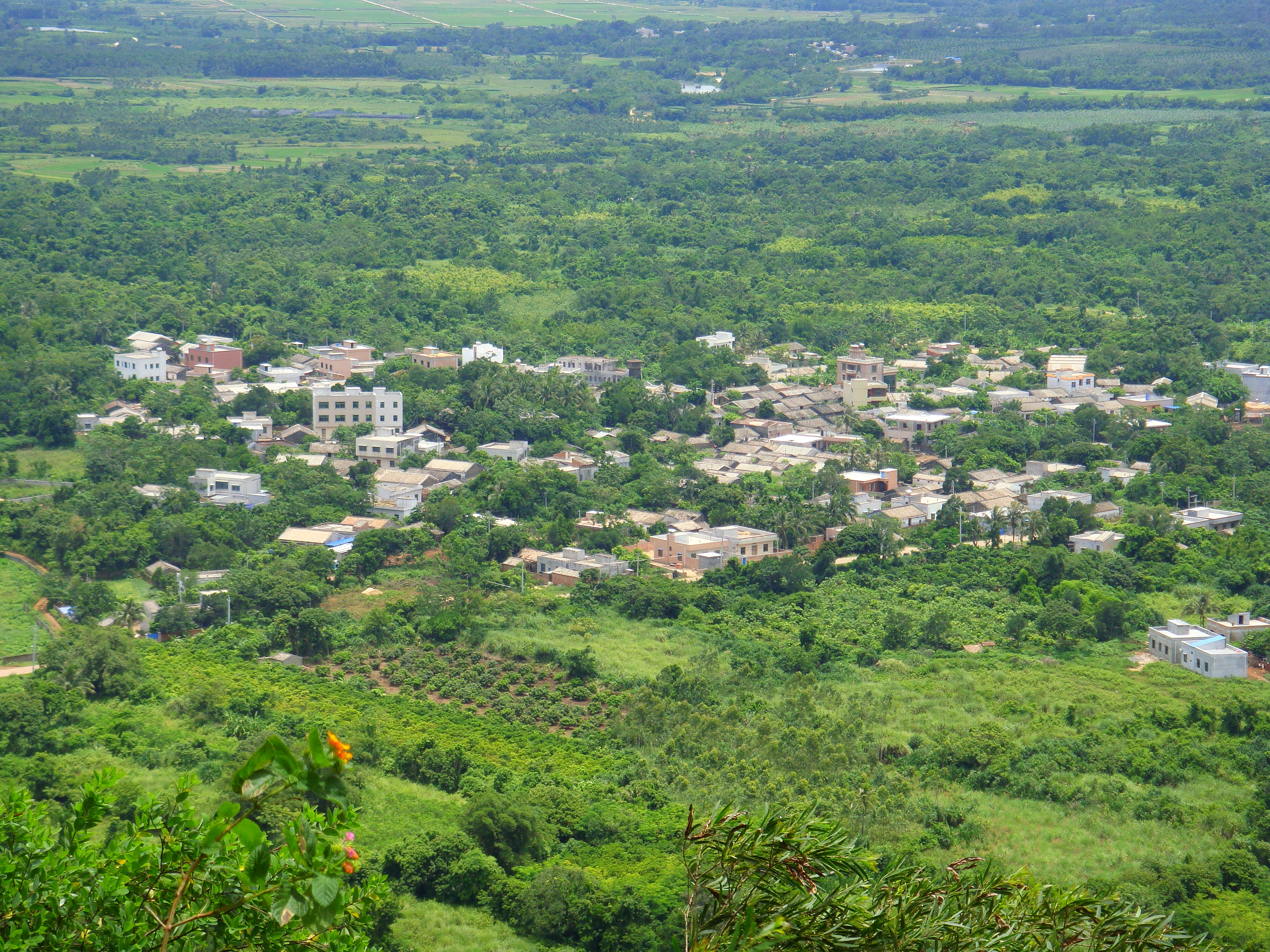
A typical rural village in Hainan, China

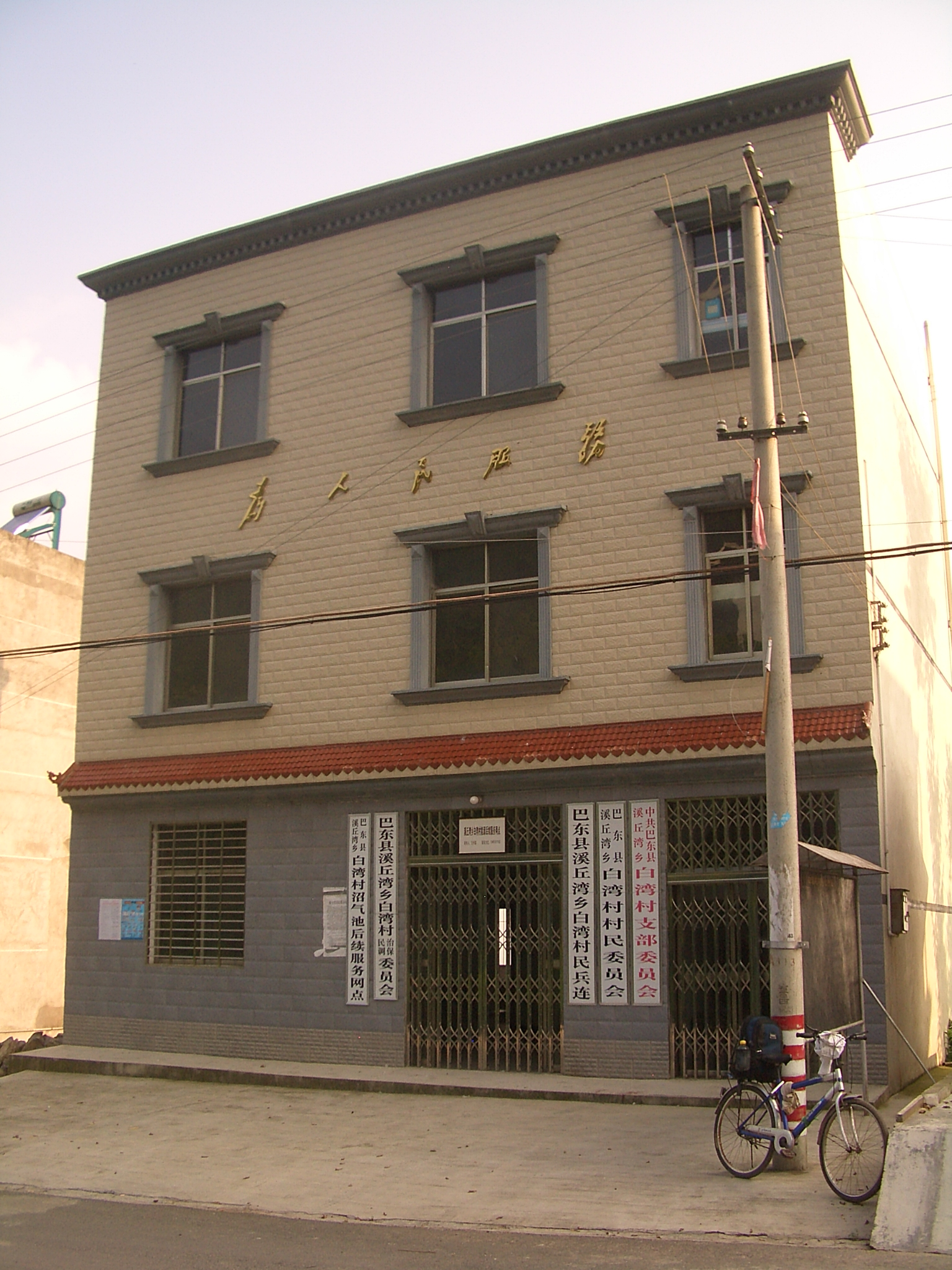
The building housing the local village committee and other government offices and organizations in Baiwan Village, Xiqiuwan Township, Badong County, Hubei

- Administrative village or Village (Chinese: 行政村 or 村; pinyin: xíngzhèngcūn or cūn)
- Hamlet or Band (Chinese: 屯; pinyin: tún)
- Gacha (Chinese: 嘎查; pinyin: gāchá) only for Inner Mongolia.
- Ranch (Chinese: 牧委会; pinyin: mùwěihuì) only for Qinghai.
- Ethnic village (Chinese: 民族村; pinyin: mínzúcūn) only for village populated by Ethnic minority.
  - Village committees (simplified Chinese: 村民委员会; traditional Chinese: 村民委員會; pinyin: cūnmín wěiyuánhuì)
    - Villager groups (simplified Chinese: 村民小组; traditional Chinese: 村民小組; pinyin: cūnmín xiǎozǔ)

=== Natural village ===
Natural villages (Chinese: 自然村; pinyin: zìráncūn) are residential communities as a social concept, which are often described as a village. They do not have formally defined boundaries, although during the late Qing dynasty and Republic of China era, rules defined who was a resident of a particular natural village. They are often named as cun (村), tun (屯), ying (营), zhaizi (寨子), zhuang (庄), wanzi (湾子), or bang (浜), depending on the region. An estimated 2 million of these villages exist in China, with their number decreasing rapidly at a rate of over 100 a day due to urbanisation and consolidation.

== Lists of village-level divisions ==
Villages (村)

List of villages in China

Provinces

- List of village-level divisions of Anhui
- List of village-level divisions of Fujian
- List of village-level divisions of Gansu
- List of village-level divisions of Guangdong
- List of village-level divisions of Guizhou
- List of village-level divisions of Hainan
- List of village-level divisions of Hebei
- List of village-level divisions of Heilongjiang
- List of village-level divisions of Henan
- List of village-level divisions of Hubei
- List of village-level divisions of Hunan
- List of village-level divisions of Jiangsu
- List of village-level divisions of Jiangxi
- List of village-level divisions of Jilin
- List of village-level divisions of Liaoning
- List of village-level divisions of Qinghai
- List of village-level divisions of Shaanxi
- List of village-level divisions of Shandong
- List of village-level divisions of Shanxi
- List of village-level divisions of Sichuan
- List of village-level divisions of Yunnan
- List of village-level divisions of Zhejiang

Autonomous areas

- List of village-level divisions of Guangxi
- List of village-level divisions of Inner Mongolia
- List of village-level divisions of Ningxia
- List of village-level divisions of the Tibet Autonomous Region
- List of village-level divisions of Xinjiang

Municipalities

- List of village-level divisions of Beijing
- List of village-level divisions of Chongqing
- List of village-level divisions of Shanghai
- List of village-level divisions of Tianjin

== See also ==
- Ethnic villages of China
- Organic Law of Village Committees
- Urban-type settlement, a similar concept used in the Soviet Union and present day Russia
