= Guangzhou Jianye Building fire =

2013 fire in Guangzhou, China

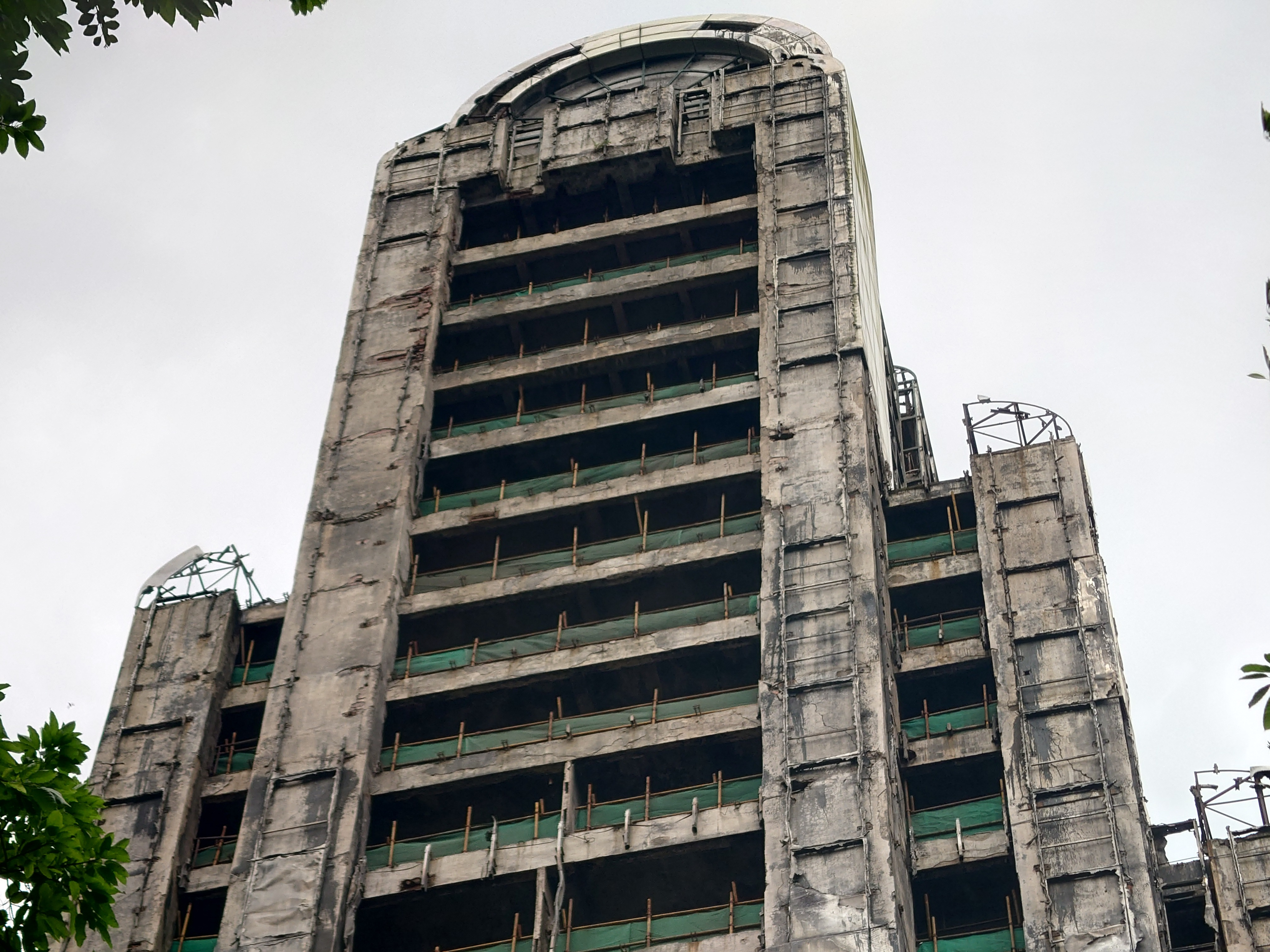
Cracks in the building's exterior walls after the fire2

On December 15, 2013, an accidental fire started at the Jianye Building in Yuexiu District, Guangzhou, Guangdong, China after a short circuit in the main power line on the first floor, which ignited combustible materials in the corridor. The burned area reached 12,500 square meters, with no casualties reported. The Guangzhou fire department dispatched a total of 28 squadrons, 58 fire engines, and 380 officers and firefighters to the scene to extinguish the fire. According to preliminary official estimates, the accident caused about RMB 40 million in economic losses. The final confirmed economic loss was RMB 40.66 million. However, the Guangzhou Wenzhou Chamber of Commerce stated that 32 Wenzhou merchants who rented warehouses in Jianye Building suffered total losses of nearly RMB 80 million.

== Background ==
Jianye Building was an unfinished building located in Guangzhou, at No. 271-231 Guangzhou Qiyi Road, Yuexiu District. It was originally planned to have three underground floors for parking and equipment rooms, floors 1 to 5 as a shopping mall, and floors 6 to 25 as office space, with a total floor area of 26,044 square meters. The building was invested in and developed in 1993, began construction and external sales in 1995, and was originally scheduled for delivery in 1998. However, due to the Asian financial crisis, the developer suffered a funding breakdown, and construction stopped in 1998 after the main structure was completed.

After 2000, the building was leased out as a parking lot and warehouse. The first floor was used as a parking lot, while floors 2 to 25 became warehouses for many shoe stores on nearby Jiefang Road to store shoes. The exterior of Jianye Building had already been fitted with glass curtain walls, but there was no surrounding wall or main gate. Only one pillar bore the handwritten words “Jianye Building” and the building number in white paint. The interior of the building had not been renovated, and many pipes and wires were exposed.

== Course of the fire ==
=== December 15 ===
At around 18:37 on December 15, 2013, a short circuit occurred in the main power line on the first floor of Jianye Building, igniting combustible materials in the corridor. According to survivors, at around 19:00, security guards notified people inside the building that a fire had broken out. By that time, open flames were already visible on floors 3 to 5. Another survivor said that floors 1 to 5 had all caught fire due to an electrical short circuit. Some survivors stated that the fire occurred on a Sunday, when there were relatively few people in the building.

At 20:20, a fireball suddenly burst out from around the 18th floor of the building. Floors above the 10th floor were engulfed in flames, and several explosions were heard. Some metal sheets from the exterior wall were burned by the fire and drifted through the air, while debris fell to the ground. Glass from several floors shattered and flew toward the ground due to excessive heat.

=== December 16 ===
At around midnight the next day, flames from Jianye Building shot into the sky, and the thirty-story building was completely engulfed in fire. Thick smoke poured out of the building, a pungent burnt smell filled the air, and sparks from burning materials fell from high above. At around 2:00, the fire was still burning fiercely.

At 5:55, the open flames on the upper floors of the building had basically been extinguished. Only the interior of about three floors in the middle section was still burning, but the flames were gradually weakening. A large amount of white smoke was coming from the eastern side of the building, while the sky above was surrounded by black smoke.

At around 7:00, the main fire in Jianye Building had been extinguished, but there were still several small open flames from the bottom to the top of the building. Large amounts of thick smoke rose from the burning areas, blocking the sky and surrounding buildings. At around 10:00, a few flames remained inside the building. Several high-elevation water cannon fire engines were still spraying water onto the floors, and large amounts of white smoke continued to rise from inside. Sounds of glass and building materials falling could be heard, and all kinds of debris from the burning building were scattered around the surrounding area. At around 14:25, three high-elevation water cannon fire engines withdrew. Only thin smoke drifted around Jianye Building, with no visible open flames, and the building itself had basically stopped emitting smoke. After the fire was extinguished, the building revealed a blackened exterior and exposed steel bars.

== Rescue and firefighting ==
To extinguish the fire, the Guangzhou Fire Bureau mobilized 28 squadrons, 58 fire engines, and 380 commanders and firefighters. The Guangdong Provincial Fire Corps also sent reinforcements from its special service brigade, Dongguan detachment, Foshan detachment, and Shenzhen detachment, including a total of 8 aerial ladder trucks and 7 high-elevation water cannon trucks. Since the building had not been completed, its internal fire protection system could not be activated. Firefighters could only first attempt to fire hoses and enter the interior fire scene. Later, as the fire intensified, firefighters inside the building withdrew, and the main firefighting effort shifted to fire engines and fire monitors set up on surrounding rooftops.

At 18:50 on December 15, the 119 command center received the fire report. The Yuexiu Squadron, Jiefangbei Squadron, and Yuexiu District Brigade then rushed to the scene. Five minutes later, the Yuexiu Squadron saw thick smoke from Danan Road and requested reinforcements. At 19:55, three trapped people on the 22nd and 25th floors were rescued by firefighters. The fire on floors 1 to 5 gradually weakened under the control of fire engines. At 20:20, as the fire intensified, the number of fire engines at the scene increased to 15, and Qiyi Road was also closed. At 21:10, the closed-off area continued to expand.

At 2:30 on December 16, the fire department brought in two high-elevation water cannon fire engines for reinforcement. However, the water jets could only reach a little above the 10th floor and could not deal with the fire on the top floors. Because the temperature of the fire in the building was very high, the water jets sprayed toward the fire were often evaporated before reaching the flames. At around 14:25, three high-elevation water cannon fire engines withdrew. At 16:00, one fire engine was still spraying water toward the building. The firefighting teams at the scene did not officially leave until 12:00 on December 18.

During the firefighting process, although the water supply company increased the pressure of the fire hydrants, it still could not meet the needs of such a long firefighting operation. Firefighters once considered using helicopters to extinguish the fire, but the glass curtain wall on the top of the building and the floor slabs on each level would have blocked the water flow, so the plan was ultimately not carried out.

== Evacuation and resettlement ==
The fire caused 1,600 nearby residents to be evacuated.

At 21:10 on December 15, with the assistance of firefighters, Guangdong Overseas Chinese High School, located near the building, dismissed students early. At the same time, the closed-off area continued to expand. Starting from 22:15, residential areas near the building began to evacuate. Residents’ committees relocated residents to temporary shelters, such as Guangzhou Huimin Primary School, while some residents who did not meet staff from the residents’ committees went elsewhere on their own to take refuge.

At around 1:00 on December 16, to avoid the danger of the building collapsing, nearby police stations began evacuating residents door by door within a 100-meter radius of the fire scene. Since Huimin Primary School was already full, the remaining residents were relocated to Chaotian Road Primary School and the Guangzhou Office of the Shaanxi Provincial People’s Government. At Huimin Primary School, staff registered the identities of arriving residents and arranged them one by one into nearby hotels.

Although the fire was brought under control on the afternoon of December 16, the building still faced the risk of collapse. Therefore, at 19:00 that day, residents at Huimin Primary School were transferred to Chaotian Road Primary School. By 20:00, staff were still collecting information on residents at the evacuation sites.

== Official investigation and accountability ==
=== Opening of the investigation ===
At 15:00 on December 20, an accident investigation team led by the Guangzhou Public Security Fire Bureau and composed of members from the supervisory bureau and the work safety bureau held its first meeting at the fire scene.

=== Investigation findings ===
==== Direct cause ====
On January 28, 2014, the Yuexiu District People’s Procuratorate filed a public prosecution. It stated that the direct cause of the accident was that an electrician surnamed Jin, who was responsible for installing, inspecting, repairing, and maintaining the electrical circuits of Jianye Building, violated technical operating procedures while rectifying and installing the main power line of the warehouse where the fire started. This caused a short circuit in the main power line and ignited combustible materials.

In the Investigation Report on the Guangzhou “12·15” Major Fire Accident, released by Guangzhou Fire on May 31, 2014, the direct cause of the accident was identified as a short circuit in the main power line on the first floor of Jianye Building, which ignited combustible materials. Because the building’s fire protection facilities and other overall engineering works had not been completed, and because the building had a large fire load, the fire spread rapidly and took a long time to extinguish.

==== Indirect causes ====
The Investigation Report on the Guangzhou “12·15” Major Fire Accident, released by Guangzhou Fire on May 31, 2014, stated that the indirect causes of the fire were as follows:

- Jianye Building failed to fulfill its main responsibility for fire safety and engaged in illegal business operations.
- The building’s daily fire safety management was inadequate. Electrical equipment and wiring were installed and arranged in violation of regulations, and a large number of fire hazards had long existed.
- Relevant personnel from the municipal mediation and coordination office and other departments committed serious dereliction of duty in organizing and coordinating the reconstruction and revitalization of Jianye Building.
- The Yuexiu District Public Security Sub-bureau failed to effectively perform its duties in fire supervision and management.
- The Yuexiu District Government, the Guangta Subdistrict Office of Yuexiu District, and the Guangta office of the Yuexiu District Administration for Industry and Commerce failed to properly perform their local regulatory duties.

=== Handling of officials ===
On December 18, 2013, Yuexiu police in Guangzhou issued a notice stating that five responsible persons related to Jianye Building, including a person surnamed Li, had been criminally detained by the Yuexiu District Public Security Sub-bureau on suspicion of the crime of causing a fire safety accident.

On May 31, 2014, the Guangzhou Municipal People’s Government reviewed and approved the conclusion of the Investigation Report on the Guangzhou “12·15” Major Fire Accident, determining that the accident was a major fire safety responsibility accident. The investigation report stated that 41 people bore responsibility for the accident, of whom 30 were staff members of regulatory departments. In the end, six people were arrested and prosecuted for conviction on charges of “dereliction of duty.” They were:

- Lin Jianshu, deputy director of the Mediation Work Management Division of the Guangzhou Municipal Justice Bureau;
- Yao Zhixiang, deputy director of the Real Estate Construction and Development Division of the Guangzhou Municipal Urban and Rural Construction Commission;
- Chen Yurong, principal staff member of the Fire Prevention Section of the Yuexiu District Public Security Bureau;
- Huang Lichuan, director of Guangta Street Police Station;
- Chen Yunqiao, deputy director of Beijing Street Police Station;
- Huang Juefeng, police officer at Kuangquan Street Police Station.

However, after court hearings, only bribery charges resulted in criminal sentencing. In Chen Yunqiao’s case, the Liwan District People’s Court held that Chen had carried out inspection work, imposed a series of penalties, and reported the building’s situation in a timely manner. Since he had also left the post by the time the fire occurred, the crime of dereliction of duty was not established.

== Compensation ==
Because Jianye Building was an unfinished building, the owners of the warehouses inside the building had not obtained property ownership certificates. In addition, the developer could not be located, making compensation claims difficult. Wu Yanjun, secretary of the Yuexiu District Committee, also stated that the leasing relationship between the merchants and the property owners was illegal, and that the government would not accept compensation applications, but could only provide legal assistance. A legal adviser from the Guangzhou Municipal Land Resources and Housing Administrative Bureau said that the owners could sue the developer for breach of contract and could also sue the building management company to recover losses caused by poor management.

== Aftermath ==
After the Jianye Building fire, the building remained enclosed by green construction hoarding for a long period. On May 6, 2025, the Guangzhou Municipal Planning and Natural Resources Bureau announced that the reconstruction plan for the Jianye Building had passed review by the Guangzhou Environmental Art Committee. The original building had already begun to be demolished and was about to enter the implementation stage.
