= Henglida Chemical =

Chinese chemical company

Xiangshui Henryda Tech Chemical Co., Ltd.
- Industry: Dyes & Dye Intermediates
- Founded: 21 July 2010; 15 years ago Xiangshui County, Jiangsu
- Headquarters: Xiangshui Ecological Chemical Industrial Park, Xiangshui County, Yancheng, Jiangsu, China
- Products
- Operating income: CN¥650.8610 billion (2017)
- Net income: CN¥83.8104 billion (2017)
- Total assets: CN¥920.4686 billion (2017)
- Number of employees: 100-500
- Parent: Jiangsu Wuzhong Group Co. Ltd.
- Divisions: Sales headquarters in Suzhou
- Website: www.henryda-chem.com/template/index-e.html

Henglida Chemical
- Simplified Chinese: 响水恒利达科技化工有限公司
- Traditional Chinese: 響水恆利達科技化工有限公司
Transcriptions
Standard Mandarin
- Hanyu Pinyin: Xiǎngshuǐ hénglìdá kējì huàgōng yǒuxiàn gōngsī

Henryda Chemical (often transliterated as Henglida Chemical) is a chemical plant in the Xiangshui Ecological Chemical Industrial Park, Jiangsu, China. It is a wholly owned subsidiary of Jiangsu Wuzhong Group Co. Ltd..

== History ==
In July 2016, acquisition by Jiangsu Wuzhong Group was completed.

On Apr 18, 2018, CCTV-2's Economy 30 Minutes reported environmental pollution issues along the lower reaches of Guanhe River.

On Apr 19, 2018, Environmental Protection Department of Jiangsu required a "thorough checking" of pollution issues in the three industrial zones (Yanweigang, Duigougang and Chenjiagang. Henryda Chemical was ordered to stop production afterwards.

On Dec 28, 2018, Henryda Chemical announced that it would continue production on Dec 29, as permitted by the County Government.

On Mar 21, 2019, an explosion occurred in Tianjiayi Chemical, of the same industrial zone. Henryda Chemical was affected by the blast wave. The roof collapsed. Windows and doors were blown out. Production was stopped again, with no known resuming date.

== See also ==
- 2019 Xiangshui chemical plant explosion
- Tianjiayi Chemical
- Chenjiagang Town
