= Xu Zonghan =

Chinese doctor

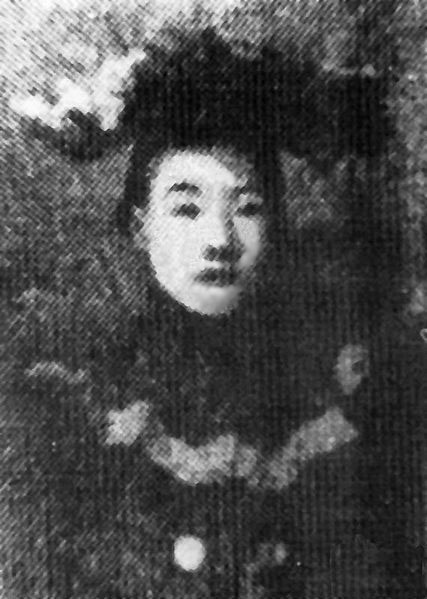

Xu Zonghan (Chinese: 徐宗漢; 1877 - 8 March 1944) was a Chinese doctor during the 1911 Revolution, which overthrew China's Qing Dynasty in 1911. She was a companion of the revolutionary general, Huang Xing.

== Biography ==
=== Early revolutionary career ===
Xu Zonghan was born in 1876 in Zhuhai, Guangzhou into a family of compradors and tea merchants. She lived with her father in Shanghai from a young age, attending private schools. At 18, she married a man named Li Jinyi, a native of Haifeng County. In 1907, her husband died, leaving her a widow. Due to her close relationship with Zhang Zhujun, a former Christian physician, she was influenced by her and converted to Christianity between 1901 and 1902. She sold her entire dowry to help Zhang Zhujun establish the Tifu and Nanfu hospitals in Guangzhou, as well as the Yuxian Girls' School.

In 1907, during the 33rd year of the reign of Emperor Guangxu, Xu Zonghan travelled to Southeast Asia at the invitation of her second sister, Xu Peiyao, who was teaching in Penang. While in Penang, she joined the Tongmenghui (Chinese Revolutionary Alliance) and subsequently assisted Wu Shirong, Huang Jinqing, Chen Xinzheng, and others in promoting revolution among overseas Chinese . In the autumn of 1908, she returned to China. While passing through Hong Kong, she visited Feng Ziyou at the China Daily newspaper office and established contact with the Tongmenghui there. She was then instructed to return to Guangzhou to organize a new branch of the Tongmenghui with artists Gao Jianfu and Pan Dawei.

Shortly thereafter, Xu Zonghan and others established the Shouzhen Zhebi Bookstore in Guangzhou, which served as the secret liaison office and venue for the Tongmenghui. Due to the efforts of Xu Zonghan and others, the number of Tongmenghui members in Guangzhou continued to increase. During this period, female doctors like Liang Huanzhen, Chen Ruiyun, Luo Daoying, Yang Lehan, were introduced to the Tongmenghui by Xu Zonghan. In September of the first year of the Xuantong reign (October 1909), the Tongmenghui established a Southern Branch in Hong Kong, preparing to launch the New Army Uprising in Guangzhou. Xu Zonghan participated in the preparations for the uprising and made more than a hundred blue sky, white sun and red earth flags with Sun Mei, Yang Dechu, Chen Shuzi (wife of Hu Hanmin), Li Ziping (wife of Feng Ziyou) and others. She was also ordered to secretly transport bombs into Guangzhou with Chen Shuzi and Li Ziping. She also went to Datang on the south bank of the Pearl River to contact the secret society. In December 1909, Xu Zonghan was ordered to re-establish an office in Yi'anli, with his nephew Li Yingsheng and others. On the 14th day of the first lunar month in the second year of the Xuantong reign (February 12, 1910), the Guangzhou New Army uprising broke out. Xu Zonghan seized the opportunity to set fire to the Yi'anli office, attempting to disrupt the "Qing officials' eyes and ears." However, the fire was extinguished by local police, and the flag of the Tongmenghui, the Blue Sky with a White Sun, sewn into a quilt, was seized by the police. After the "plot was exposed," Xu Zonghan and Zhuang Hanqiao fled to Hong Kong together.

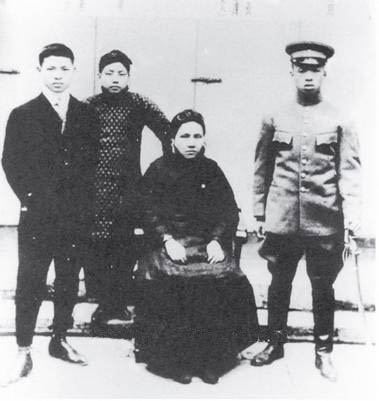
In 1911, when Xu Zonghan (seated in the middle) was the captain of the Guangdong Northern Expedition Bomb Squadron, he and his team members (from right) Li Yingsheng, Zhuo Guoxing, and Li Peiji took a photo at the Nanjing Garrison Office.

In March 1911, on the eve of the Huanghuagang Uprising, Xu Zonghan was assigned to Hong Kong to transport firearms and ammunition. He also set up bomb-making facilities in Hong Kong's Lyndhurst Street and Guangzhou's Xixia. After the Huanghuagang Uprising failed, the leader, Huang Xing, fled to the Xixia headquarters. Xu Zonghan bandaged his injured finger and provided meticulous care for him. On April 29, 1911, Xu Zonghan escorted Huang Xing from Guangzhou to Hong Kong on the night ferry Hadean. They arrived in Hong Kong on April 30, 1911. Xu Zonghan arranged for Huang Xing to be admitted to Alice Hospital for treatment. Because the hospital required a relative's signature before surgery, Xu Zonghan signed on behalf of his wife. After Huang Xing recovered from his injuries and was discharged from the hospital, they married.

In October 1911, the Wuchang Uprising succeeded. Huang Xing, invited by the Central Headquarters of the Tongmenghui and the Hubei Military Government, traveled north with Xu Zonghan. The couple arrived in Shanghai on October 24, 1911. At the time, the Qing government tightened its blockade of the Yangtze River ports. Xu Zonghan enlisted the help of Zhang Zhujun, a Shanghai-based doctor. Under the guise of battlefield service, Zhang Zhujun established a Red Cross rescue team and sent them to the Hubei front. Huang Xing, disguised as a nurse, and Xu Zonghan, likewise, joined the team, arriving in Hankou on October 28, 1911. During the Battle of Wuhan, Xu Zonghan participated in treating the wounded. When the militia abandoned Hankou, the Qing army blocked the Yangtze River. Xu Zonghan and Zhang Zhujun used a Red Cross ferry to transport Huang Xing to Wuchang. In February 1912, peace talks between the North and the South were successful. Yao Yuping, commander of the Fourth Army of the Guangdong Northern Expedition, led his troops back to Nanjing from the Xuzhou front, bringing with him hundreds of children who had been orphaned during the war. Huang Xing then raised funds to establish the First Orphanage in Nanjing to commemorate the founding of the People's Republic of China. Sun Yat-sen inscribed the name for the institution, and Xu Zonghan and Zhou Qiyong were in charge of it.

In 1913, after the Second Revolution failed, Xu Zonghan and Huang Xing fled into exile in Japan. In July 1914, Sun Yat-sen reorganized the Kuomintang into the Chinese Revolutionary Party in Japan. Huang Xing disagreed with the reorganization of the new party and decided to go to the United States. Xu Zonghan and his son Huang Yimei accompanied him, along with his cousin Xu Shenbo as translator, and secretaries Shi Taojun and Li Shucheng. Between July and August 1916, Xu Zonghan and Huang Xing left the United States and returned to China via Japan. Huang Xing died of illness in Shanghai on October 31, 1916, and Xu Zonghan remained in Shanghai thereafter.

=== After the May Fourth Movement ===
In 1919, when the May Fourth Movement broke out, Xu Zonghan and Li Guo, principal of Shanghai Bowen Girls' School, initiated the establishment of the Shanghai Women's Federation, with Xu Zonghan becoming one of its leaders. That same year, she became president of the All-China Women's Federation, with Li Dazhao 's wife, Wang Huiwu, serving as secretary, and Qu Qiubai 's wife, Wang Jianhong, as clerk. On December 13, 1921, under the planning of Li Dazhao and Chen Duxiu, the Shanghai Women's Federation launched the women's magazine "Women's Voice" the first women's publication of the Chinese Communist Party. Li Dazhao served as editor-in-chief. As a representative of the Shanghai Federation of All Circles, she participated in the preparatory work for the establishment of the National Federation of All Circles initiated by the Tianjin Federation of All Circles, and served as a member of its standing committee. After the May Fourth Movement, she sponsored young people to study and work in France.

In 1921, a severe famine struck Soviet Russia, and the Russian Disaster Relief Association was established in Shanghai. She served as the director of the association's speech department and travelled around to give speeches and raise funds.

=== Taking over the orphanage ===
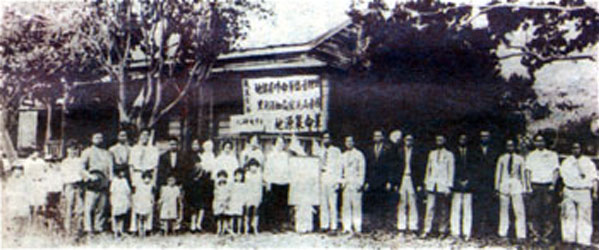
Xu Zonghan was photographed on May 18, 1930, when he visited Honolulu Island to raise funds.

After the National Revolutionary Army captured Nanjing during the Northern Expedition in 1927, Xu Zonghan took over the First Orphanage for Children, which she had helped to establish. In 1932, she also founded a farm in Maoshi, a northern township in Xuancheng, Anhui, as a place for students from the orphanage to practice their labour.

In 1931, Xu Zonghan traveled to the United States to solicit donations from overseas Chinese to raise funds for an orphanage. During this time, the September 18th Incident broke out, and she remitted the donations she had raised in the United States to the anti-Japanese frontline soldiers. She also raised donations in the United States, Mexico, Brazil, Cuba, Peru, and other countries, raising 450,000 pesos in Mexico alone.

After the outbreak of the Second Sino-Japanese War in 1937, the orphanage was moved to Xuancheng, and later moved to Chongqing and disbanded.

In early 1938, Xu Zonghan took some monetarily poor children to Siam (modern Thailand) to visit overseas Chinese, promoting the cause of resistance against Japan and raising funds for the poor. After returning to China in 1939, she founded the Yunnan branch of the First Founding of the People's Republic of China Poor Children's Orphanage at the Zunsheng Pagoda on Jizu Mountain in Yunnan. However, due to funding difficulties, it soon closed.

=== Lives in Chongqing ===
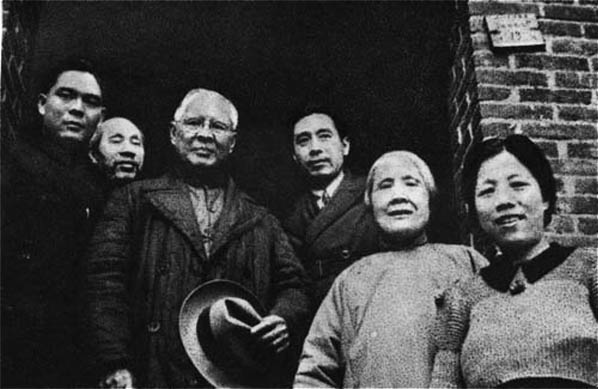
In December 1941, Zhou Enlai and others received Situ Meitang, Xu Zonghan and others at the Eighth Route Army Chongqing Office. From left: Situ Zhu (Situ Meitang's eldest son), Dong Biwu, Situ Meitang, Zhou Enlai, Xu Zonghan, Deng Yingchao

In 1940, Xu Zonghan moved to Chongqing. Thereafter, she frequently interacted with representatives of the Chinese Communist Party in Chongqing, including Zhou Enlai, Dong Biwu, and Deng Yingchao. She even posed for a photo with them at the Eighth Route Army's Chongqing office. Huang Xing's youngest son, Huang Nai (originally named Huang Yihuan, born to Huang Xing's first wife, Liao Danru), had studied at the Anti-Japanese Military and Political University in Yan'an during the early years of the Second Sino-Japanese War (he later served in the Propaganda Department of the CPC Central Committee and the Enemy Work Department of the General Political Department of the Eighth Route Army). Xu Zonghan then asked Zhou Enlai and Deng Yingchao to deliver daily necessities and a personal letter to Huang Nai, urging him to "study hard and see you later."

On March 8, 1944, Xu Zonghan died of liver disease at the age of 68.

== Legacy ==
In 2011, on the 100th anniversary of the Revolution of 1911, Xu Zonghan's hometown of Zhuhai, named her "the most influential Zhuhai woman in a century".

== Popular culture ==
In Jackie Chan's film "1911" it recounts the historical events of the 1911 Revolution. Xu Zonghan is played by Li Bingbing. The film received mixed reviews.
