= Organic Law of Village Committees =

Law of the People's Republic of China

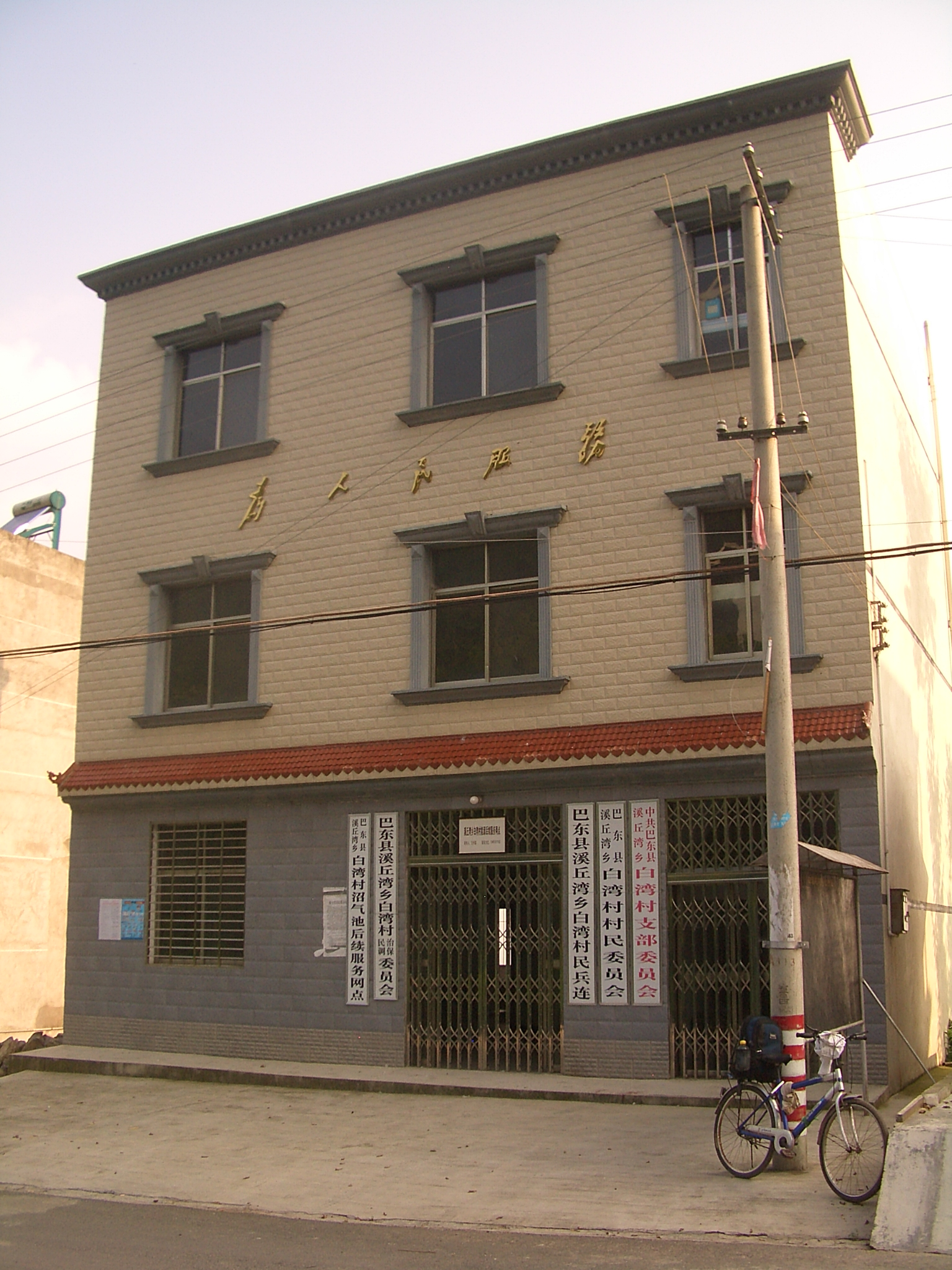
The building housing the local village committee and other organizations in Baisha Village, Xiqiuwan Township, Badong County, Hubei

The Organic Law of Village Committees of the People's Republic of China (Chinese: 中华人民共和国村民委员会组织法; pinyin: Zhōnghuá Rénmín Gònghéguó cūnmín wěiyuánhuì zǔzhīfǎ) consists of 30 articles about self-governance, self-education and elections in Chinese villages.

== See also ==
- Law of the People's Republic of China
- National People's Congress
- Villagers' committee (cunweihui)
- Residents' committee (juweihu)
