= List of village-level divisions of Jiangsu =

Location of Jiangsu province in China

This is a list of an approximate rendering of the names of the village-level divisions of the province of Jiangsu, People's Republic of China (PRC) into a romanized form derived from Standard Mandarin Pinyin.

== Yancheng ==
=== Xiangshui ===
==== Chenjiagang ====
Division names	Division level	Authority	Statistical division code
Hai'an 海安 (Hǎi'ān)	Zhen-Xiang(town & township) combination zone	海安居委会	320921101001
Dawan 大湾 (Dàwān)	Zhen-Xiang combination zone	大湾居委会	320921101002
Zhongxing 中兴 (Zhōngxīng)	Zhen-Xiang combination zone	中兴居委会	320921101003
Xinmin 新民 (Xīnmín)	Zhen-Xiang combination zone	新民居委会	320921101004
Xinzhong 新中 (Xīnzhōng)	Zhen-Xiang combination zone	新中居委会	320921101005
Gangbei 港北 (Gǎngběi)	Zhen-Xiang combination zone	港北居委会	320921101006
Jingang 金港 (Jīngǎng)	Zhen(town) central area	金港居委会	320921101007
Mangniu 蟒牛 (Mǎngniú)	Zhen-Xiang combination zone	蟒牛居委会	320921101008
Gangnan 港南 (Gǎngnán)	Zhen-Xiang combination zone	港南居委会	320921101009
Caogang 草港 (Cǎogǎng)	Zhen-Xiang combination zone	草港居委会	320921101010
Shadang 沙荡 (Shādàng)	Zhen central area	沙荡居委会	320921101011
Wangshang 王商 (Wángshāng)	Zhen-Xiang combination zone	王商居委会	320921101012
Xiaxin 下辛 (Xiàxīn)	Village	下辛村委会	320921101203
Hexin 合心 (Héxīn)	Village	合心村委会	320921101204
Xiaogang 小港 (Xiǎogǎng)	Village	小港村委会	320921101205
Sigang 四港 (Sìgǎng)	Village	四港村委会	320921101206
Lili 立礼 (Lìlǐ)	Village	立礼村委会	320921101210
Liugang 六港 (Liùgǎng)	Village	六港村委会	320921101211
Xingang 新光 (Xīnguāng)	Village	新光村委会	320921101212
