= Hai'an, Chenjiagang =

Hai'an Ji 海安集
- Zhen-Xiang(town & township) combination zone
- Location in Jiangsu
- Coordinates: 34°18′50″N 119°45′08″E
- Country: People's Republic of China
- Province: Jiangsu
- Prefecture-level city: Yancheng
- County: Xiangshui
- Time zone: UTC+8 (China Standard)
- Postal code: 224637
- Area code: 0515

Hai'an Ji (Chinese: 海安集; pinyin: Hǎi'ān jí), often shortened as Hai'an (Chinese: 海安; pinyin: Hǎi'ān), is a town-level region in Chenjiagang, Xiangshui County, Jiangsu, China.

== Administrative divisions ==
On July 3, 2001, Hai'an Ji xiang(township) (海安集乡) was merged into Chenjiagang zhen(town) (zh:陈家港镇). No change was made to location names.

This area is currently recognized as a Zhen-Xiang(town & township) combination zone by the National Bureau of Statistics of China.

=== Villager groups ===
This list is incomplete.

- Hai'an 1st Group (海安一组)
- Hai'an 2nd Group (海安二组)
- Hai'an 3rd Group (海安三组)
- Hai'an 4th Group (海安四组)
- Hai'an 5th Group (海安五组)

== Education ==
- Hai'an Ji Central Elementary School (响水县海安集中心小学)
- Chenjiagang Xinmin Elementary School (陈家港新民小学), previously Hai'an Ji Xiang Xinmin Elementary School (海安集乡新民小学)
- Hai'an Ji Middle School (响水县海安集中学)

== Notable places ==
- Hai'an Fireworks Factory (海安花炮厂)
- Chenjiagang grain storage - a 50,000-tons grain storage spot located in Hai'an Ji.

== See also ==
- Chenjiagang Town
- 2019 Xiangshui chemical plant explosion
