= 2019 Xiangshui chemical plant explosion =

Fatal explosion in Jiangsu, China

- Date: 21 March 2019
- Location: Chenjiagang Chemical Industry Park (陈家港生态化工园区), Xiangshui County, Yancheng, Jiangsu, China; 34°20′31″N 119°46′41″E
- Cause: Chemical plant explosion
- Deaths: 78
- Injuries: 617

2019 Xiangshui chemical plant explosion (Jiangsu)

On 21 March 2019, a major explosion occurred at a chemical plant in Chenjiagang Chemical Industry Park, Chenjiagang, Xiangshui County, Yancheng, Jiangsu, China. According to reports published on 25 March, 78 people were killed and 617 injured.

The State Council of China officially recognized the severity of the accident, often referred to as the "3.21 Explosive Accident".

== Background ==
The facility—located in Yancheng's industrial park—was operated by Tianjiayi Chemical (江苏天嘉宜化工有限公司), and was used to produce fertilizer or pesticides. Some sources reported that the plant produced organic chemicals, including some highly flammable compounds. Tianjiayi Chemical had been penalized six times for infractions of pollution and waste management laws, and China Daily reported fines over safety issues. This plant has had fires and deaths in the past; there is no government program to keep chemical plants like this one up to standard to prevent such disasters.

According to the South China Morning Post, this chemical plant paid bribes to journalists and local officials to avoid negative publicity or possible closure. This information came from an engineer who helped to create this plant and similar plants that have disregarded multiple safety regulations. General Secretary of the Chinese Communist Party Xi Jinping and State Council premier Li Keqiang are "demanding the government to shut down these chemical firms when they do not comply to safety regulations".

On 27 November 2007, an explosion occurred in one of the chemical factories in Chenjiagang Chemical Zone (陈家港生态化工园区), with seven killed and around 50 injured. On 23 November 2010, more than 30 people were poisoned by a toxic gas release. In the early morning of 11 February 2011, rumors of toxic chemical release and potential imminent explosions in the Chenjiagang Chemical Industry Park led over ten thousand residents to evacuate in panic from the towns of Chenjiagang and Shuanggang (双港镇), during which four people died and many were injured. On the afternoon of 18 May, and again on 26 July in 2011, there were explosions at local factories.

== Explosion ==
The 21 March 2019 explosion occurred at a local time of 14:48 (06:48 GMT). Seventy-eight people were killed, and at least 94 were severely injured, 32 of whom were critically injured. Around 640 people required hospital treatment and were taken to 16 hospitals. The injured included children at a local kindergarten. CENC detected an M_{L}2.2 artificial earthquake whose epicenter is at 34.331°N 119.724°E.

The force of the blast started numerous fires in Yancheng, knocked down several buildings, and reportedly shattered windows several kilometers away. The fire was under control by 03:00 local time. Considerable damage was caused to nearby factories and offices; the roof of Henglida Chemical Factory, 3 kilometres (1.9 mi) from the explosion, fell in. At least one of the people killed was in another building destroyed by the blast. Windows were reported to have been blown out up to 6 kilometres (3.7 mi) away from the explosion, and houses and other buildings were damaged in the nearby village-level administrative divisions including Hai'an Town (Haianju) (海安社区) and Shadang (沙荡社区). This explosion was strong enough that it registered on earthquake sensors and could be seen by satellites. The blast created a crater resulting in a magnitude 2.2 seismic shock that took over 900 firefighters to get the fire under control.

=== Aftermath ===
The search for survivors was ongoing on 23 March; one survivor was rescued from the site on the same morning, but 25 of the 28 people earlier reported missing were found dead. According to the Jiangsu environmental protection bureau, the monitored levels of benzene, toluene, and xylene in the area were not abnormal, and levels of acetone and chloroform outside the explosion area were within normal limits. However, according to the South China Morning Post article entitled "Devastation at blast site after China chemical plant explosion leaves at least 64 dead, 640 injured" the surrounding three rivers were polluted with exceedingly high levels of dichloroethane and dichloromethane, at 2.8x and 8.4x the normal level, according to national water quality standards. The 170-metre-wide (560 ft) crater, 2 m (6 ft) deep, is required to be filled in, along with neutralizing the soil to prevent contamination to the surrounding community. "This chemical plant was flattened, along with the surrounding 16 factories that also have varying degrees of damage" per the South China Morning Post.

The precise cause of the explosion is not yet known. There were no reports of anything abnormal at the plant before the explosion. A worker at the plant reported the cause was a fire in a natural gas tanker that spread to the benzoyl storage tank, but this has not been confirmed.

On 4 April 2019, the Standing Committee of the Yancheng Committee of the Chinese Communist Party had a meeting where it was decided to definitively close down the Xiangshui Chemical Industry Park.

On 15 November 2019, the State Council approved the investigation report, presented by the investigation team of the State Council. The report asserts that the explosion accident was a serious production safety accident: there was a long-term practice of illegal storage of hazardous waste, resulting in spontaneous combustion and explosion.

The CCP Central Commission for Discipline Inspection and the State Supervisory Commission issued warnings to Fan Jinlong and Fei Gaoyun, Jiangsu Provincial People's Government executive deputy governor and deputy governor, respectively. At the same time, investigations and criminal charges were filed against 44 enterprises and executives, for illegal storage of dangerous substances, significant violations of labor safety measures, environmental pollution, and forgery of certification documents.

=== Controversy ===
There were reports of censorship following the blast, with news articles and posts on social media discussing the incident removed by officials.

According to Radio Free Asia, during the disaster, the local government used anti-drone technology to stop drones being used by journalists (jamming technologies or actively shooting them down). The local government prevented foreign media from entering the disaster area and hospitals to prevent them from conducting interviews. Interviews were only granted to some in the Chinese media.

The Beijing News ridiculed the local government for enforcing the principle of "prevent fire, prevent theft, and prevent journalists".

== See also ==
- 2015 Tianjin explosions
- 2020 Beirut explosions
- Domino effect accident
- List of explosions
