= Shadang, Chenjiagang =

Shadang Village 沙荡村
- Town central area
- Location in Jiangsu
- Coordinates: 34°21′14″N 119°45′45″E
- Country: People's Republic of China
- Province: Jiangsu
- Prefecture-level city: Yancheng
- County: Xiangshui
- Subdistrict: Xiangshui Ecological Chemical Industrial Park
- Time zone: UTC+8 (China Standard)
- Postal code: 224637
- Area code: 0515

Shadang Village (simplified Chinese: 沙荡村; traditional Chinese: 沙盪村; pinyin: Shādàng Cūn) is a town central area located in Chenjiagang, Xiangshui County, Jiangsu, China.

On Mar 21, 2019, an explosion occurred in Tianjiayi Chemical, a chemical plant 1 kilometer away from Shadang. Buildings in Shadang Village were seriously affected by the blast wave. Shutter doors and windows were torn out of shape. Residents were not evacuated as of 20:00 (UTC+8).

== Administrative divisions ==
This area is currently recognized as a Zhen(town) central area by the National Bureau of Statistics of China.

It belongs to the subdistrict of Xiangshui Ecological Chemical Industrial Park and is administrated by Shadang Neighborhood Committee (Chinese: 沙荡居委会).

== See also ==
- Chenjiagang Town
- 2019 Xiangshui chemical plant explosion
