= Huang Kuo-chu =

Huang Kuo-chu (Chinese: 黄国柱; pinyin: Huáng Guózhù; born November 1952), pen name Huangfu (皇甫), is a retired People's Liberation Army (PLA) major general and writer from Xiangshui County, Jiangsu Province, China. He formerly served as the editor-in-chief and president of the People's Liberation Army Daily, and was a member of the 11th Chinese People's Political Consultative Conference(CPPCC).

== Career ==
Huang enlisted in the People's Liberation Army in 1969 and joined the Chinese Communist Party in March 1975. He graduated in 1982 from the Department of Chinese Language and Literature at Jilin University. Over his military and media career, he held various posts, including soldier and clerk in an infantry regiment, officer in the Cultural Department and the Propaganda Department of the Shenyang Military Region, and editor at the Cultural Division of the PLA Daily.

He later served as head of the Political Work Section and the Distribution Department of the newspaper, and as president of the PLA branch of Xinhua News Agency. Huang began publishing literary works in 1975 and became a member of the China Writers Association in 1988.

In May 2006, he was appointed director and editor-in-chief of the PLA Television Publicity Center (now the CCTV Military Program Center), holding a deputy corps-level rank. He was promoted to the rank of major general in July of the same year. In 2008, he was elected to the 11th CPPCC National Committee, representing the press and publishing sector, and was assigned to Group 44.

Huang became editor-in-chief of the PLA Daily in 2009 and was promoted to president of the newspaper in April 2012. He retired from active service in 2013 upon reaching the mandatory retirement age.

== Selected works ==
Huang Guozhu has authored several collections of essays, literary criticism, and reportage. His major publications include:

- The Desolate History (《苍凉的历史》) – A collection of critical essays that received the Third Prize for Outstanding Achievement in Contemporary Chinese Literary Studies.
- Confusion and Choice (《困惑与选择》) – A commentary on political and ideological dilemmas.
- The Glory of the North (《北国的辉煌》) – Reflections on northern China's revolutionary legacy and development.
- The Sacred Land Is Not Far Away (《圣土并不遥远》) – Winner of the 3rd People's Liberation Army Literary Award.
- Singing in the Vast and Lonely Sky (《寂寥长天唱大风》) – Recipient of a PLA Literary Award.
- The Sail on the Sea of Bitterness (《苦海的帆》) – A collection of prose and reportage literature.
