= List of village-level divisions of Anhui =

Location of Anhui province in China

This is a list of an approximate rendering of the names of the village-level divisions of the province of Anhui, People's Republic of China (PRC) into a romanized form derived from Standard Mandarin Pinyin. After province, prefecture, county-level divisions, and township-level divisions, village-level divisions constitute the formal fifth-level administrative divisions of the PRC. This list is divided first into the prefecture-level, then the county-level divisions, then township-level divisions.

== Huangshan City ==
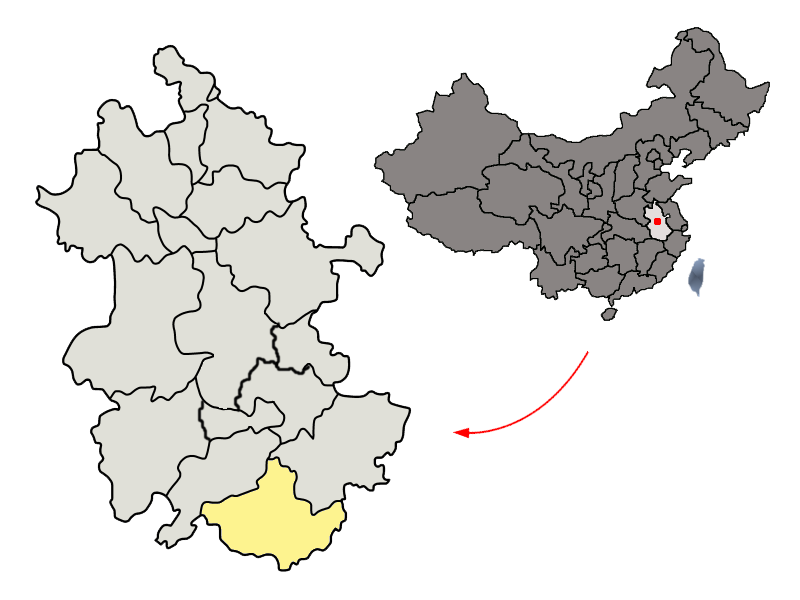
Location of Huangshan City in the province

=== Qimen County ===
Towns:

- Qishan (祁山镇), Pingli (平里镇), Jinzipai (金字牌镇), Shanli (闪里镇), Likou (历口镇), Xiaolukou (小路口镇), Anling (安凌镇), Fufeng (凫峰镇)

Townships:

- Rongkou Township (溶口乡), Tafang Township (塔坊乡), Luxi Township (芦溪乡), Guxi Township (古溪乡), Xin'an Township (新安乡), Ruokeng Township (箬坑乡), Baixi Township (柏溪乡), Qihong Township (祁红乡), Datan Township (大坦乡), Zhukou Township (渚口乡)

==== Likou ====
Thirteen villages:

- Shiqi (石碛村), Wuling (武陵村), Guanghui (光辉村), Xu (许村), Xitang (西塘村), Zhengchong (正冲村), Shendu (深都村), Xiangdong (湘东村), Lixi (历溪村), Penglong (彭龙村), Huansha (环砂村), Fuling (甫岭村), Yechen (叶陈村)
