= Chenjiagang =

Chenjiagang 陈家港镇
- Town
- Location in Jiangsu Chenjiagang (China)
- Coordinates: 34°22′26″N 119°48′02″E
- Country: People's Republic of China
- Province: Jiangsu
- Prefecture-level city: Yancheng
- County: Xiangshui

Area
  - Total: 85.18 km^{2} (32.89 sq mi)

Population (2009)
  - Total: 51,358
  - Density: 602.9/km^{2} (1,562/sq mi)
- Time zone: UTC+8 (China Standard)
- Postal code: 224637
- Area code: 0515

Chenjiagang (simplified Chinese: 陈家港镇; traditional Chinese: 陳家港鎮; pinyin: Chénjiāgǎng Zhèn; lit. 'Chen family's Port'), often abbreviated to Chengang (simplified Chinese: 陈港; traditional Chinese: 陳港; pinyin: Chéngǎng; lit. 'Chen's Port'), is a town in Xiangshui County, Jiangsu, China.

== Administrative divisions ==
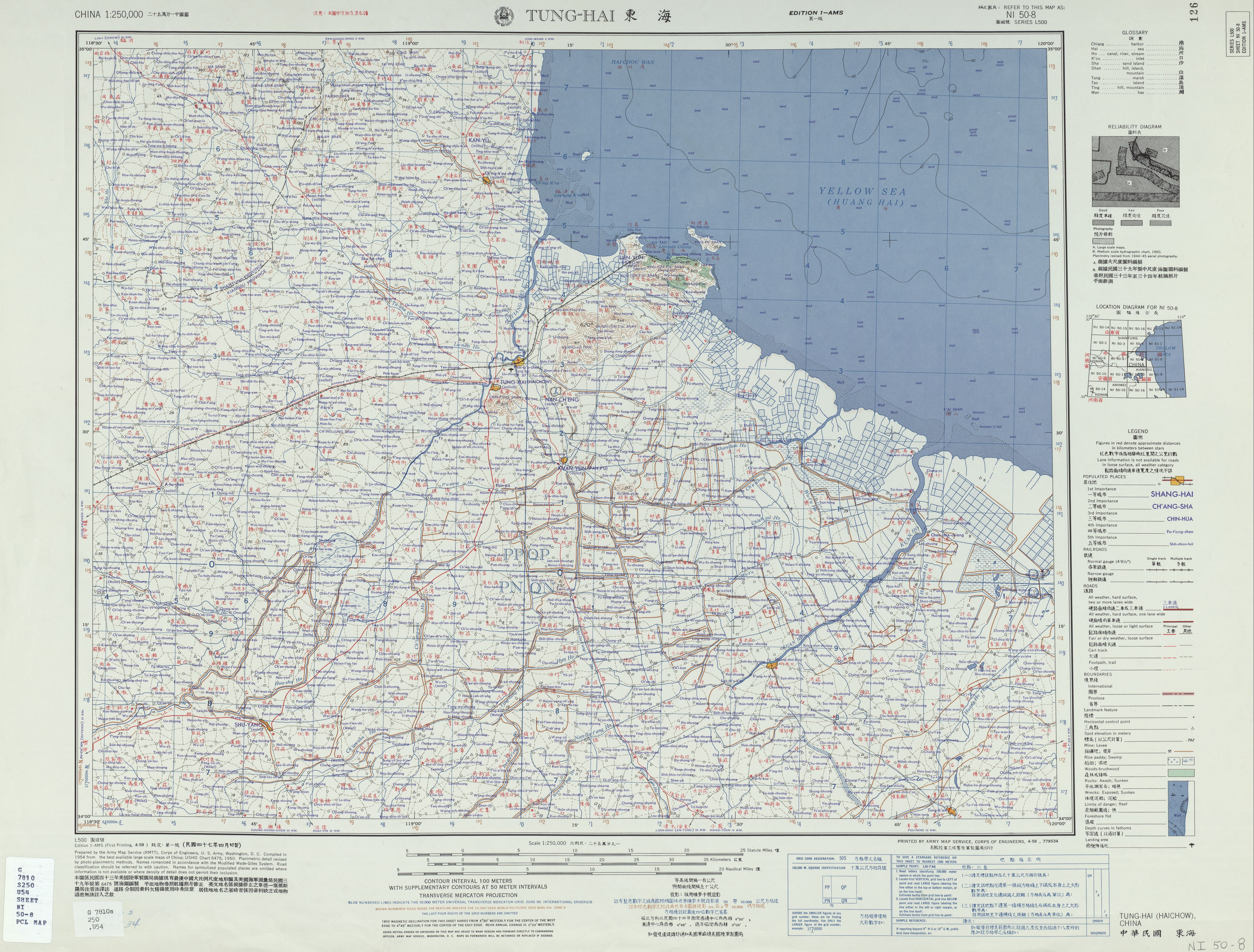
Map including Chenjiagang (labeled as Chen-chia-chiang 陳家港) (1954)

On July 3, 2001, Hai'an Ji xiang(township) (海安集乡) was merged into Chenjiagang zhen(town). No change was made to location names.

Division names	Division level	Authority	Statistical division code
Hai'an 海安 (Hǎi'ān)	Zhen-Xiang(town & township) combination zone	海安居委会	320921101001
Dawan 大湾 (Dàwān)	Zhen-Xiang combination zone	大湾居委会	320921101002
Zhongxing 中兴 (Zhōngxīng)	Zhen-Xiang combination zone	中兴居委会	320921101003
Xinmin 新民 (Xīnmín)	Zhen-Xiang combination zone	新民居委会	320921101004
Xinzhong 新中 (Xīnzhōng)	Zhen-Xiang combination zone	新中居委会	320921101005
Gangbei 港北 (Gǎngběi)	Zhen-Xiang combination zone	港北居委会	320921101006
Jingang 金港 (Jīngǎng)	Zhen(town) central area	金港居委会	320921101007
Mangniu 蟒牛 (Mǎngniú)	Zhen-Xiang combination zone	蟒牛居委会	320921101008
Gangnan 港南 (Gǎngnán)	Zhen-Xiang combination zone	港南居委会	320921101009
Caogang 草港 (Cǎogǎng)	Zhen-Xiang combination zone	草港居委会	320921101010
Shadang 沙荡 (Shādàng)	Zhen central area	沙荡居委会	320921101011
Wangshang 王商 (Wángshāng)	Zhen-Xiang combination zone	王商居委会	320921101012
Xiaxin 下辛 (Xiàxīn)	Village	下辛村委会	320921101203
Hexin 合心 (Héxīn)	Village	合心村委会	320921101204
Xiaogang 小港 (Xiǎogǎng)	Village	小港村委会	320921101205
Sigang 四港 (Sìgǎng)	Village	四港村委会	320921101206
Lili 立礼 (Lìlǐ)	Village	立礼村委会	320921101210
Liugang 六港 (Liùgǎng)	Village	六港村委会	320921101211
Xingang 新光 (Xīnguāng)	Village	新光村委会	320921101212

== Education ==
- Little Sun Kindergarten (小太阳幼儿园)
- Guandong Elementary School (响水县灌东小学)
- Chenjiagang Central Elementary School (陈家港中心小学)
- Chenjiagang Middle School (响水县陈家港中学)
- Guandong Middle School (陈家港镇灌东中学)
- Hai'an Ji: Hai'an Ji Central Elementary School (响水县海安集中心小学)
- Hai'an Ji: Xinmin Elementary School (陈家港新民小学), previously Hai'an Ji Xiang Xinmin Elementary School (海安集乡新民小学)
- Hai'an Ji: Hai'an Ji Middle School (响水县海安集中学)
- Hexin Cun: Yixin Elementary School (陈家港义新小学)
- Lili Cun: Lili Elementary School (陈家港立礼小学)
- Xiaogang Cun: Xiangshui DFM Middle School (响水县东风中学)
- Wangshang Cun: Wangshang Elementary School (陈家港王商小学)

== Notable places ==
- Xiangshui Ecological Chemical Industrial Park, previously known as Chenjiagang Chemical Concentration Zone (陈家港化工集中区).
- Chenjiagang grain storage - a 50,000-tons grain storage spot located in Hai'an Ji.

== See also ==
- 2019 Xiangshui chemical plant explosion
