= Jianye Building =

Building in Guangzhou, China

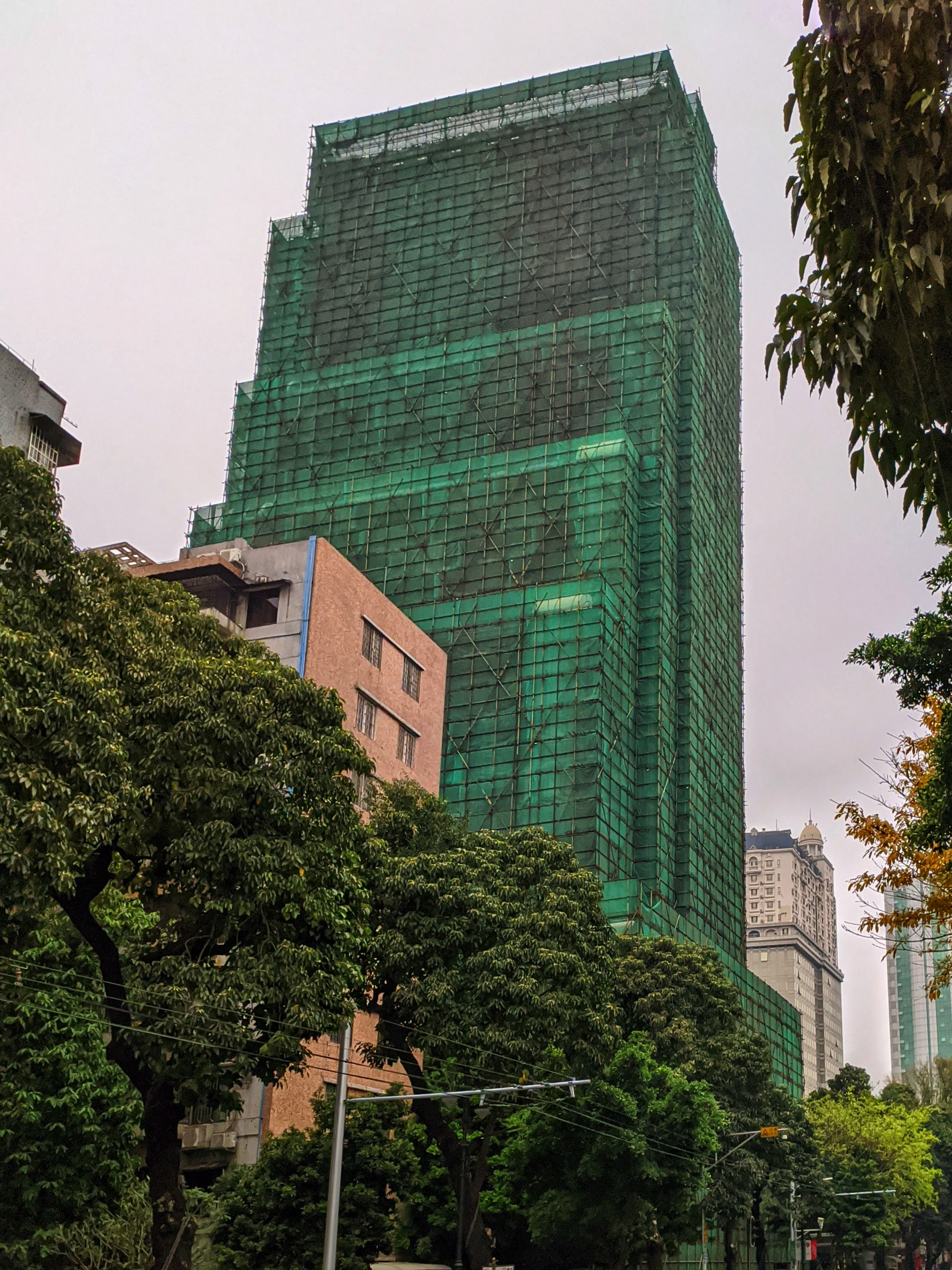
A building wrapped in a construction shed after a fire, 2020

Jianye Building is an unfinished building in Guangzhou that is currently being demolished. It is located at No. 271-231, Guangzhou Qiyi Road Yuexiu District. Construction of the building began in 1995 and was originally scheduled to be completed in 1998. Due to the Asian financial crisis, the developer ran out of funds and construction was suspended. Since 2000, its parking lot and warehouse have been rented out. A major fire broke out in Jianye Building on December 15, 2013. In April 2024, the construction shed surrounding the building began to be demolished, and then the demolition and reconstruction of Jianye Building began .

== History ==
=== Planning and construction ===
The building was approved in 1993. Construction and sales began in 1995, with the building originally scheduled for completion in 1998.

=== Funding shortage ===
Affected by the Asian financial crisis, the developer ran out of funding and construction was suspended after topping out. The building could not be put into use as it had not passed the required inspections.

=== Private transformation ===
In 2000 the building began to be rented out for use as a parking lot and warehouse, particularly for use by the large number of nearby shoe stores on Jiefang Road.

=== Fire ===
At around 18:37 on December 15, 2013, the main power line on the first floor of Jianye Building short-circuited, igniting combustibles in the corridor. The building's fire protection systems failed due to the reliance on a temporary power system. The fire began at 20:20 and burned for 19 hours. The fire did not cause any deaths or injuries, but resulted in estimated damages of RMB 40.66 million.

=== Demolition and reconstruction ===
After the fire, the Jianye Building was surrounded by a green construction shed. There were rumors that the building would be demolished, but the building will remain enclosed until 2024.

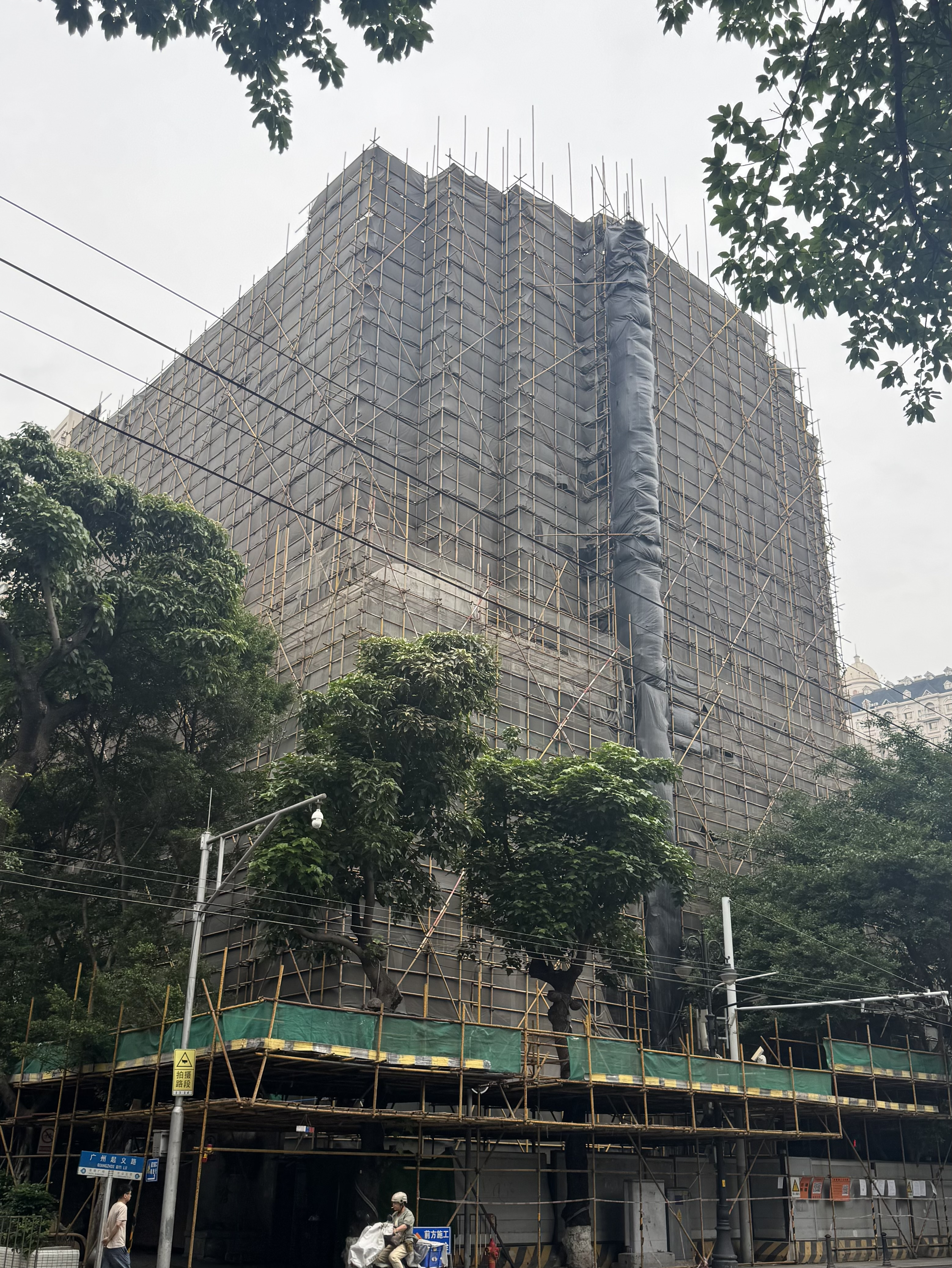
Jianye Building is being dismantled during the construction shed demolition, taken on April 19, 2024

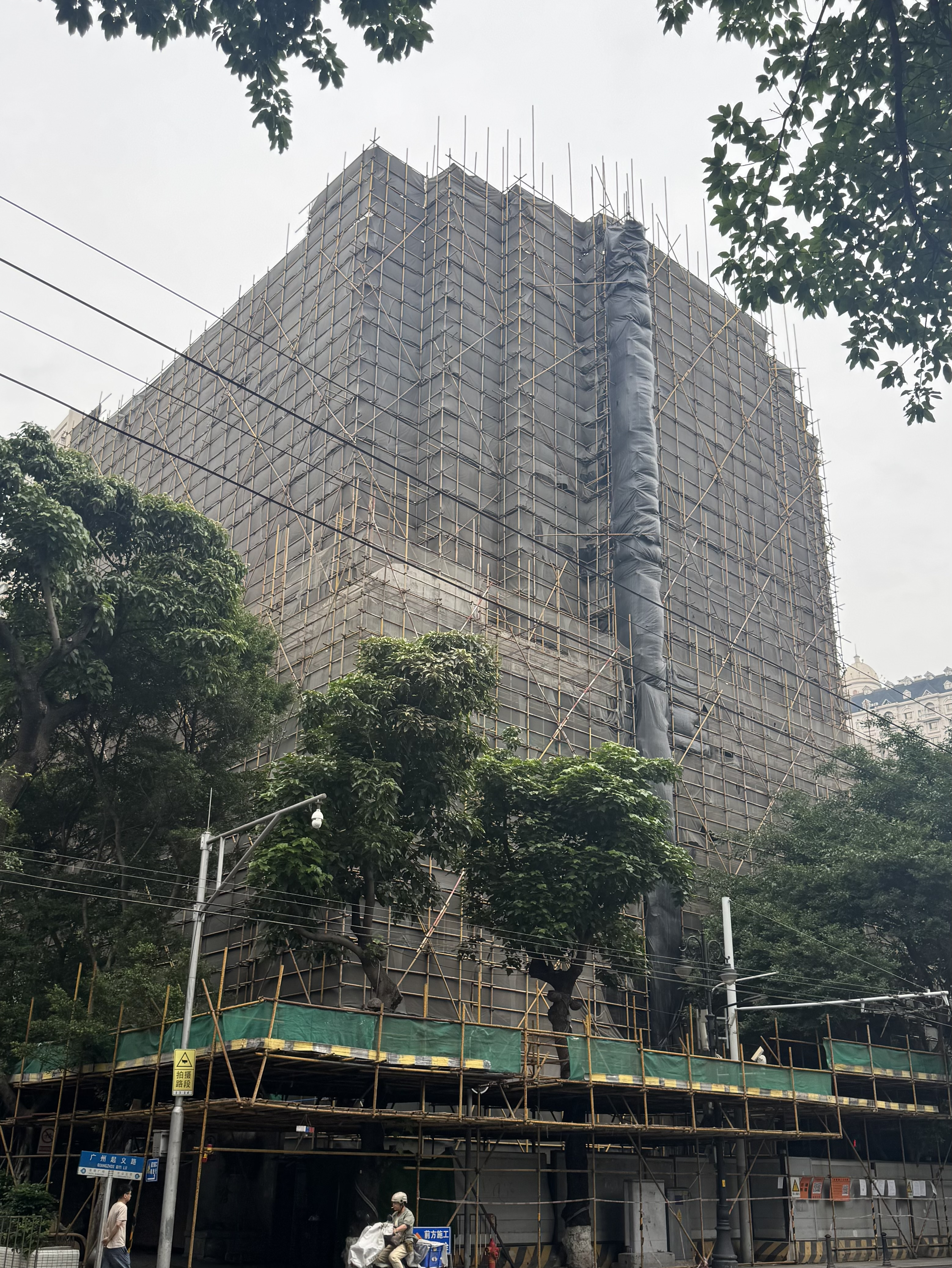
Jianye Building being demolished, taken on May 25, 2025
