= Villagers' committee =

- Simplified Chinese: 村民委员会
- Traditional Chinese: 村民委員會
- Literal meaning: Village committee
Transcriptions
Standard Mandarin
- Hanyu Pinyin: cūnmín wěiyuánhuì

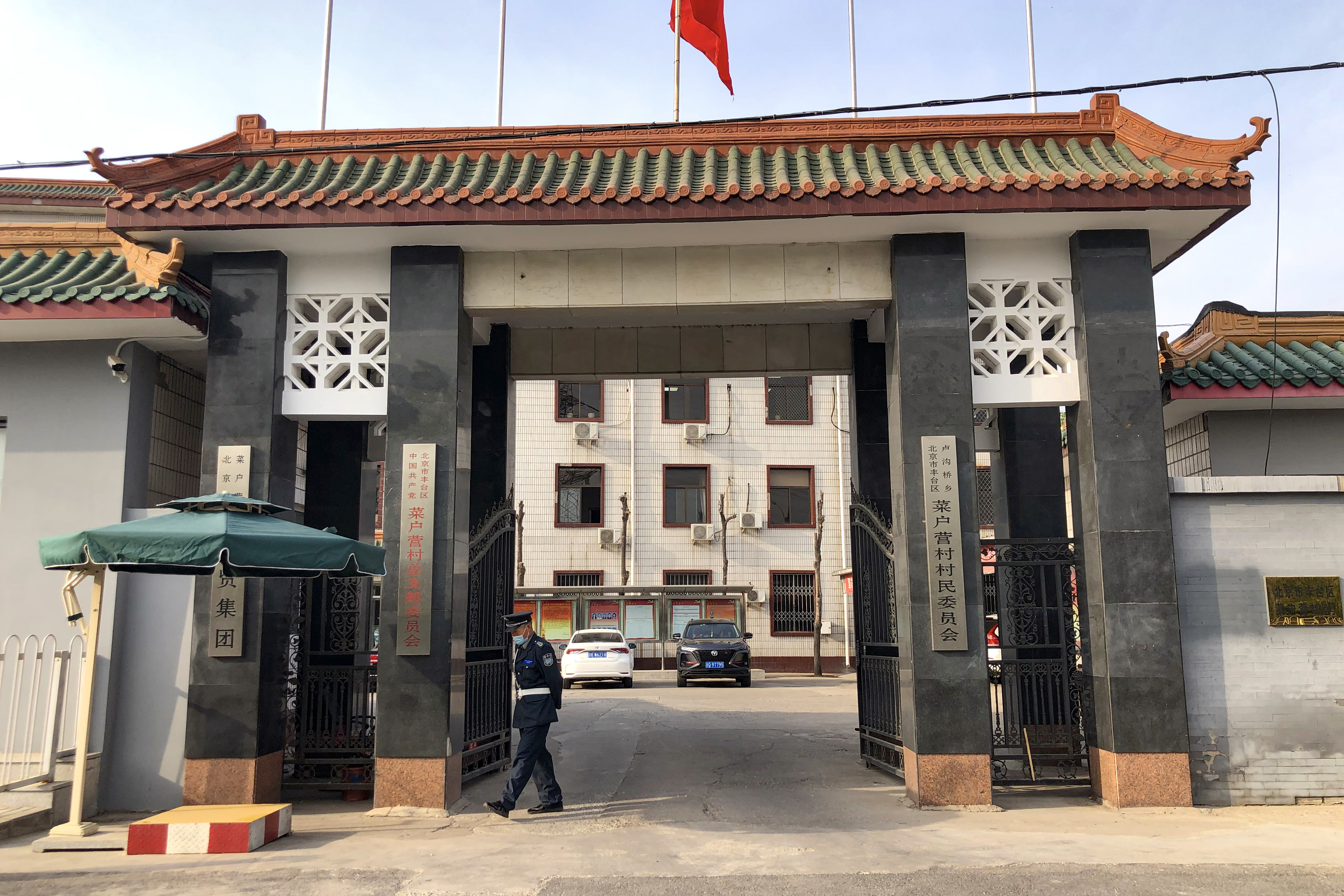
Caihuying Villagers' Committee

The villagers' committee (simplified Chinese: 村民委员会; traditional Chinese: 村民委員會; pinyin: cūnmín wěiyuánhuì), shortened as cunweihui in Chinese, also translated as village committee, is a grassroots mass autonomous organization for self-management, self-education and self-service for villagers in the People's Republic of China. It adopts democratic elections, democratic decision-making, democratic management and democratic supervision. It is based on the Organic Law of Village Committees of the People's Republic of China.

The villagers' committee was previously known as the production brigade, and was an important part of the system of people's commune.

A villagers' committee shall be responsible and reports to the Villagers' Assembly or the Assembly of Villagers' Representatives. And the committee is composed of 3 to 7 members, including a director, vice-director and members. The status of a villagers' committee is equivalent to that of a residents' committee in cities, both of which do not belong to the state organs.

In February 1980, the first villagers' committee in mainland China was formed in Hezhai Village, Sancha Commune, Yishan County, Guangxi Zhuang Autonomous Region.

== See also ==
- Residents' committee
