= Residents' committee =

Community administrative unit under township-level division

- Simplified: 居民委员会
- Traditional: 居民委員會
- Also translated as: residents' association

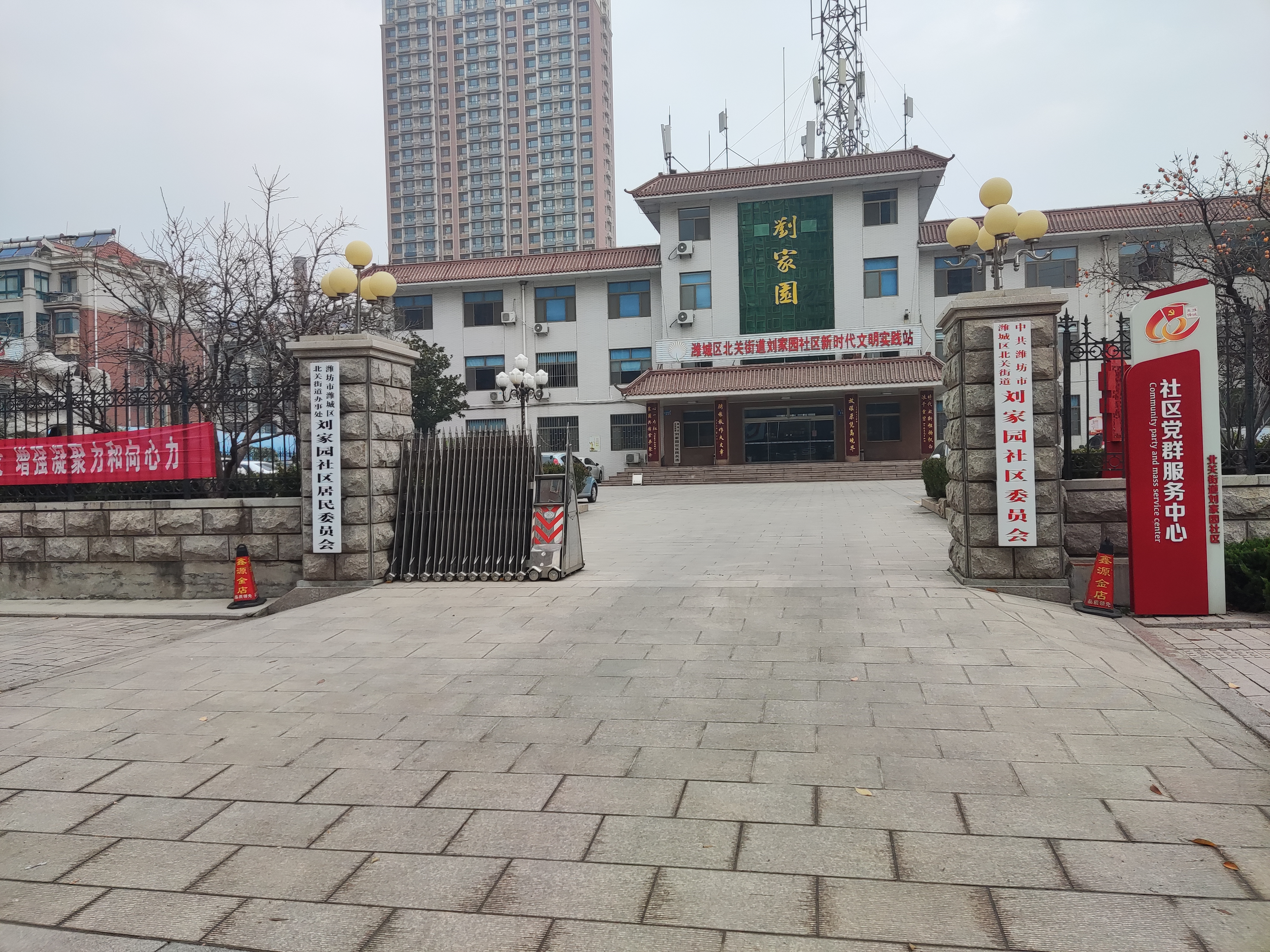
A residents' committee in Weifang, Shandong, co-located with the Communist Party's neighbourhood committee, the service centre for party and mass, and the militia company

The residents' committee (simplified Chinese: 居民委员会; traditional Chinese: 居民委員會; pinyin: jūmín wěiyuánhuì), shortened as juweihui or juwei in Chinese, also translated as neighborhood committee, residents' association, residential committee, is a grassroots mass autonomous organization for self-management, self-education and self-service for residents in the People's Republic of China.

The status of a residents' committee is equivalent to that of a villagers' committee in the countryside, both of which do not belong to the state organs.

On 23 October 1949, the representatives of the residents of Shangyangshi Street, Shangcheng District, Hangzhou, Zhejiang, elected the first residents' committee of the People's Republic of China, the Shangyangshi Street Residents' Committee.

== Mobilization of Housewives into Residents' Committees in the 1950s ==
Residents' committees emerged in the early 1950s in major cities such as Shanghai, Beijing, and Tianjin as part of the Chinese Communist Party's model of democratic governance. By October 1951, 1,904 committees, under the supervision of 129 street offices, had been established. The committees transmitted state policies, mediated neighborhood disputes, addressed welfare and daily residential concerns, and functioned as grassroots surveillance for the state. Their structures, functions, and names varied until standardized regulations were established by the National People's Congress in 1954.

When the Chinese Communist Party took over Shanghai in 1949, it faced the urgent need to improve public facilities, sanitation, safety, and social welfare, especially in impoverished neighborhoods. The Department of Civil Administration (DCA) was in charge of organizing Shanghai residents in urban areas into residents' committees, initially composed mainly of male residents, and addressing residential issues in support of industrial production. Housewives, classified as "workers' family dependents (jiashu)," were regarded as personnel to be mobilized to work in residents' committees to provide services to male industrial workers. The mobilization of unemployed and "unproductive" housewives served the project of national reconstruction and socialist modernization. It also aligned with many CCP members' belief, as shown by the party-led grassroots organization Shanghai Women's Federation, that women should be liberated from backwardness and the constraints of the old "feudal" society through social involvement.

Recruitment of committee members was based on residence, and the membership was mixed-sex, but housewives were particularly valued because they were viewed by the government as politically reliable, on the assumption that they had limited social networks. Housewives were also valued as a stable workforce, since the higher employment rate among male residents prevented them from performing effectively in neighborhood work.

=== Inter-agency Competition ===
Prior to the DCA's efforts, mobilization of housewives has been initiated by Shanghai Democratic Women's Federation (SDWF, later renamed Shanghai Women's Federation) in 1949. In 1952, the SDWF established a women's congress that elected a women's committee. Through its attention to women's specific concerns, the women's committee attracted broader participation of women residents, especially housewives, than the male-dominated residents' committee had. It was soon regarded by the DCA as a competitor of the residents' committee "for cadres, for the masses, and for work."

This inter-institutional friction was addressed after a rectification campaign in residential areas that began in 1953. During the campaign, large numbers of male committee members with suspicious political backgrounds (former landlords, former Nationalist Party members, etc.), as well as those who abused power in local administration, were removed and replaced by women. By 1954, women made up 54.6 percent of residents' committee members, up from 37.3 percent in 1953. The 1954 Regulations on Residents' Committees stipulated women-work committees as a component of the residents' committees. In 1955, the municipal government formally established the DCA's regulation that women's congresses were integral yet subordinate bodies of residents' committees, and were only allowed to communicate women's demands to the committee without carrying out their own work. Historian Wang Zheng argues that, by subordinating the "mass organization" of women to the government branch, the party-state established the assisting rather than leading role of women-work in local governance.

=== Women's Work in Residents' Committees and Its Impact ===
Women working in residents' committees carried out a wide range of duties that sustained everyday neighborhood life and assisted government work. They guided residents in hygiene and sanitation work, promoted vaccination, found jobs for the poor, distributed rations to households, and collected various payments such as utility fees. In addition, they assisted government census work, communicated government policies to residents by organizing newspaper reading sessions, established community facilities such as canteens and childcare centers, ran evening education classes and reading groups, mediated neighborhood conflicts, and reported suspicious activities to the authorities. Women in residents' committees developed close relationships with neighbors and had detailed knowledge of local residents, which enabled state messages to be effectively transmitted to every household and strengthened state control at the grassroots level. Their work also presented the state as humane and responsive in residents' eyes.

As housewives increasingly entered local administration and neighborhood work, the traditional nei-wai (inside-outside) boundary became increasingly blurred. Shred residential spaces, once viewed as external to the household, were gradually redefined as a "women's sphere." Women's management of neighborhood governance replaced the historically male-run local administrative system of baojia. Residents' committee also provided them with opportunities to interact with society as individuals rather than through their families.

Women in residents' committees, through their connections with officials in the public security station and the street office, gained significant informal power within the neighborhood. For example, their opinions carried weight in decisions over the allocation of rations and subsidies for households. Their work in mediating neighborhood conflicts often earned them respect and authority among neighbors. At the same time, however, the government's valuing and reliance on women in local governance challenged existing gender norms and sometimes triggered resentment among men who felt hostile toward being subject to women's authority in neighborhood affairs.

For housewives from working-class backgrounds, who were previously doubly marginalized by gender and class, working in residents' committees enabled them to move beyond the domestic sphere and enter the social space, sometimes even the prestigious public space, such as giving talks on women's liberation at high-level political conferences. They often valued this work as breaking gender boundaries and giving them an unprecedented voice, which in turn made them deeply identify with the Party. These women were central to the CCP's efforts to project an image of a "people's government" that empowered previously oppressed groups, including women. For upper-middle-class housewives, participation in residents' committees functioned less as a source of newfound freedom beyond domesticity than as a symbol of a problem-free political status. Working-class housewives in residents' committees often had more trust from government officials and performed confidential tasks assigned by the Public Security Bureau (PSB), such as reporting suspicious activities of residents. Historian Wang Zheng argues that this differential experience reveals how the CCP's class-line dominated and divided the gender sphere in the 1950s.

The CCP viewed the mobilization of housewives into social production as a means of emancipation, and the Party adhered, at the theoretical level, to the orthodox Marxist belief that women's subordination was fundamentally rooted in economic dependence. However, according to historian Delia Davin, residents' committees represented a compromise between theory and reality. Housewives working in residents' committees did not engage in commodity production because the 1954 regulations prohibited the committees from controlling productive enterprises, and despite their large time commitment, their work was unpaid.

Mainstream state glorification of industrial labor in the 1950s to a certain degree devalued residents' committees, which were largely constituted by housewives and deemed to be occupied with trivial activities. However, within an emerging value system that praised selfless service, housewives' unpaid work in residents' committees granted them a degree of social recognition and prestige.

== See also ==
- Villagers' committee
