= Shanghai Women's Federation =

- 上海市妇女联合会
- Abbreviation: SWF
- Formation: August 1950
- Type: Non-profit organization
- Headquarters: Shanghai, China
- Parent organization: All-China Women's Federation

The Shanghai Women's Federation (Chinese: 上海市妇女联合会; pinyin: Shànghǎi shì fùnǚ liánhé huì, abbreviated SWF) is a people's organization composed of women and childcare workers in Shanghai, China. It is a local branch of the All-China Women's Federation and operates under the control of the Shanghai Municipal Committee of the Chinese Communist Party. A preparatory committee was created in June 1949 before it was established in August 1950. It was founded as the Shanghai Democratic Women's Federation (Chinese: 上海市民主妇女联合会) and was renamed to the Shanghai Women's Federation in September 1957.
