= Xiangshui County =

Xiangshui 响水县
- County
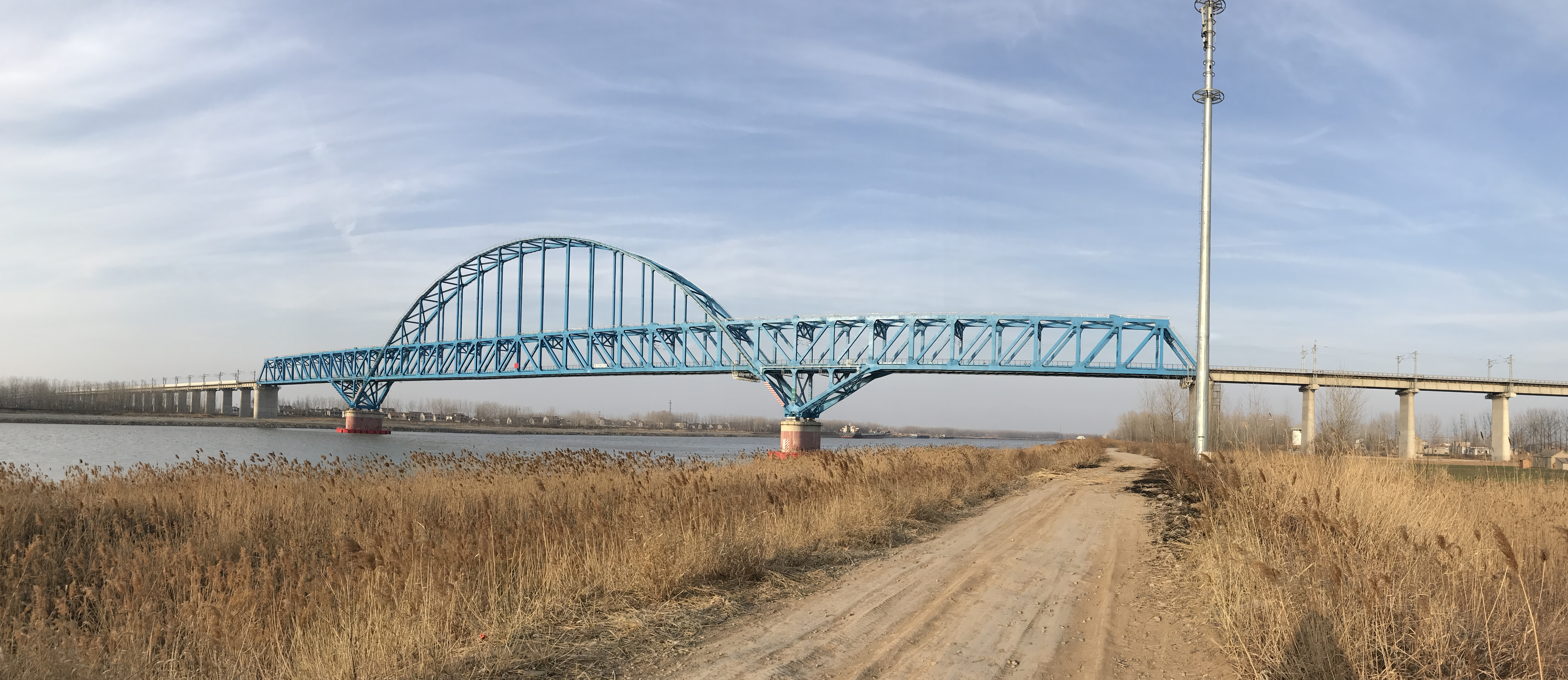
- Guanhe Bridge

- Location in Jiangsu
- Coordinates: 34°12′54″N 119°48′14″E
- Country: People's Republic of China
- Province: Jiangsu
- Prefecture-level city: Yancheng

Area
  - Total: 1,461 km^{2} (564 sq mi)

Population (2018)
  - Total: 600,000
  - Density: 410/km^{2} (1,100/sq mi)
- Time zone: UTC+8 (China Standard)
- Postal code: 224600
- Area code: 0515
- Website: xiangshui.gov.cn

Xiangshui County (simplified Chinese: 响水县; traditional Chinese: 响水縣; pinyin: Xiǎngshuǐ Xiàn; lit. 'loud water') is a coastal county under the administration of Yancheng, Jiangsu province, China. The northernmost county-level division of Yancheng, it borders the prefecture-level cities of Lianyungang to the northwest and Huai'an to the southwest. The county was founded in April 1966.

== Administrative divisions ==
There are eight towns and three other areas under the jurisdiction of Xiangshui County:

8 towns

- Xiangshui (响水 镇)
- Chenjiagang (陈家港 镇)
- Xiaojian (小尖 镇)
- Huangwei (黄圩 镇)
- Dayou (大有 镇)
- Shuanggang (双港 镇)
- Nanhe (南河 镇)
- Yunhe (运河 镇)

3 other areas

- Xiangshui County Economic and Technological Development Zone (县 开发区)
- Huanghai Farm (省属 黄海 农场)
- Guandong Saltern (省属 灌东 盐场)

Former townships

- Zhangji Township (张集 乡)
- Qitao Township (七套 乡)
- Liutao Township (六套 乡)
- Laoshe Township (老舍 乡)
- Hai'anji Township (海安集 乡)
- Gangnan Township (港南 乡)
- Zhouji Township (周集 乡)

== Geography ==
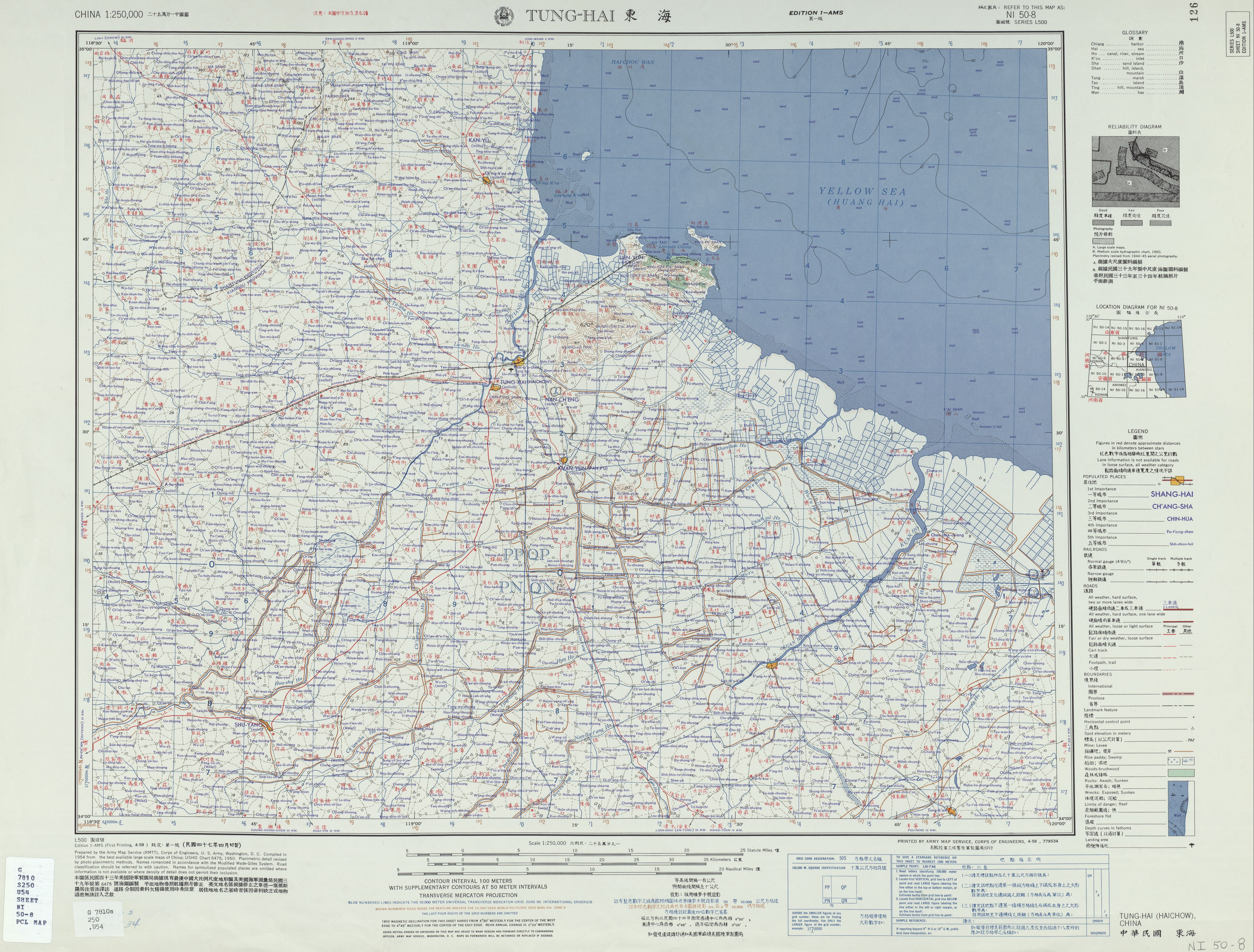
Map including Xiangshui (labeled as Hsiang-shui-k'ou 响水口) (1954)

On its northern territory, the Guanhe River, an inner river of Jiangsu, flows through from west to east until running into the Yellow Sea. The county owns 43 km of the coastal line, facing Japan and Korea by crossing the sea. Stunning local residents over years, tens of false killer whales from the Yellow Sea had swum back into its watergate as deep as 10 km. Covered by abundance of an aquatic plant species, shallow water lotus, the county is honored as a "Town of Shallow Water Lotus".

Principal natural resources include its marine area and marshland. The county is currently the largest site for sea salt production in China.

== Climate ==
Xiangshui county has an oceanic monsoon climate with humid changeable wind and distinct four seasons. The average temperature is 14 °C with the hottest 38.6 °C in July and the coldest -17 °C in January. The raining season is from the middle of June to July and the average annual precipitation is 1,000 mm. There are 209 days free of frost.

Climate data for Xiangshui, elevation 5 m (16 ft), (1991–2020 normals, extremes 1981–present)
| Month | Jan | Feb | Mar | Apr | May | Jun | Jul | Aug | Sep | Oct | Nov | Dec | Year |
|---|---|---|---|---|---|---|---|---|---|---|---|---|---|
| Record high °C (°F) | 17.7 (63.9) | 24.1 (75.4) | 31.1 (88.0) | 31.1 (88.0) | 34.4 (93.9) | 37.2 (99.0) | 39.2 (102.6) | 36.8 (98.2) | 34.4 (93.9) | 29.0 (84.2) | 27.4 (81.3) | 20.4 (68.7) | 39.2 (102.6) |
| Mean daily maximum °C (°F) | 5.6 (42.1) | 8.2 (46.8) | 14.0 (57.2) | 19.8 (67.6) | 25.0 (77.0) | 28.9 (84.0) | 30.6 (87.1) | 30.1 (86.2) | 26.5 (79.7) | 21.6 (70.9) | 14.8 (58.6) | 8.0 (46.4) | 19.4 (67.0) |
| Daily mean °C (°F) | 0.9 (33.6) | 3.0 (37.4) | 8.0 (46.4) | 13.9 (57.0) | 19.4 (66.9) | 23.7 (74.7) | 26.7 (80.1) | 26.3 (79.3) | 22.0 (71.6) | 16.2 (61.2) | 9.6 (49.3) | 3.1 (37.6) | 14.4 (57.9) |
| Mean daily minimum °C (°F) | −2.7 (27.1) | −1.0 (30.2) | 3.1 (37.6) | 8.6 (47.5) | 14.4 (57.9) | 19.4 (66.9) | 23.7 (74.7) | 23.4 (74.1) | 18.5 (65.3) | 12.0 (53.6) | 5.4 (41.7) | −0.7 (30.7) | 10.3 (50.6) |
| Record low °C (°F) | −14.2 (6.4) | −10.6 (12.9) | −5.5 (22.1) | −1.5 (29.3) | 2.3 (36.1) | 11.4 (52.5) | 19.1 (66.4) | 14.0 (57.2) | 11.3 (52.3) | 2.7 (36.9) | −4.5 (23.9) | −11.4 (11.5) | −14.2 (6.4) |
| Average precipitation mm (inches) | 22.9 (0.90) | 26.6 (1.05) | 34.9 (1.37) | 46.3 (1.82) | 71.1 (2.80) | 106.5 (4.19) | 225.1 (8.86) | 222.2 (8.75) | 84.3 (3.32) | 35.2 (1.39) | 42.6 (1.68) | 23.0 (0.91) | 940.7 (37.04) |
| Average precipitation days (≥ 0.1 mm) | 5.2 | 6.0 | 7.0 | 6.9 | 8.7 | 8.2 | 13.7 | 12.6 | 8.1 | 6.0 | 6.4 | 4.9 | 93.7 |
| Average snowy days | 2.6 | 2.7 | 1.0 | 0.1 | 0 | 0 | 0 | 0 | 0 | 0 | 0.4 | 1.0 | 7.8 |
| Average relative humidity (%) | 71 | 71 | 70 | 71 | 74 | 77 | 84 | 86 | 81 | 76 | 74 | 70 | 75 |
| Mean monthly sunshine hours | 159.8 | 154.0 | 187.9 | 207.7 | 214.8 | 183.7 | 179.6 | 186.7 | 185.7 | 189.0 | 158.8 | 159.7 | 2,167.4 |
| Percentage possible sunshine | 51 | 49 | 50 | 53 | 50 | 43 | 41 | 45 | 51 | 54 | 51 | 52 | 49 |
Source: China Meteorological Administration all-time extreme temperature

== Transport ==
Xiangshui's road transportation mainly relies on G204, S307, Jinghu (Beijing-Shanghai) Expressway and the Jiangsu Coastline Expressway, in which G204 and S307 run through the county from east to west but Jinghu and Coastline Expressway go the north–south direction. Its water transportation relies on two major rivers, the Tongyu Canal and Guanhe River. Chengjiagang Port, located at the mouth of Guanhe river, opens to international cargo transportation. The port is 36 km (22 mi) away from Lianyungang Port.

Air travellers are serviced by the Yancheng Nanyang International Airport, and Huai'an Lianshui Airport.

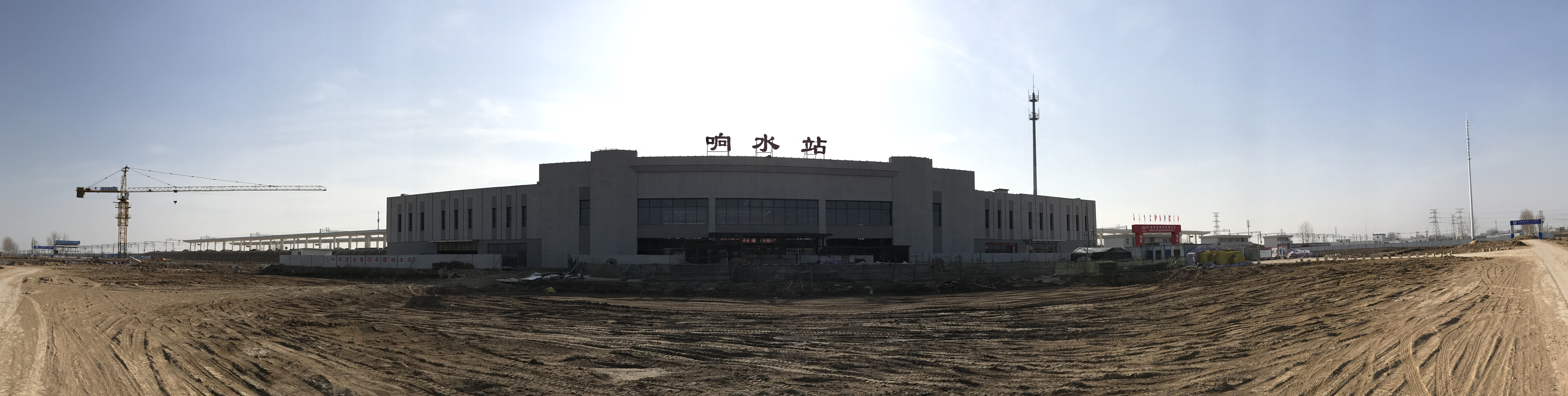
Xiangshui Station of Lianyungang-Yancheng Railway

== Economy ==
Xiangshui was traditionally a poor county, and was a testing ground for Jiangsu's economic reform policies. Its 2018 GDP was around 34.5 billion yuan, or a per capita GDP of approximately $8,300, low by Jiangsu standards. By 2018, it had joined the ranks of the "top one hundred counties for investment potential", signalling its more recent economic growth.

Xiangshui was a traditional salt-making site but now it is an important agricultural land. The agricultural income occupies 30% of the county revenue. Principal agricultural products include rice, cotton, fruit, livestock and vegetable. In addition, aquatic production has earned the county a national reputation with more than 200 sea food products including fish, crab, shrimp, etc. The county's industrial sectors are still in its early shape, including textile, chemicals, machinery, food manufacturing and pharmaceuticals.

Before 2000, Xiangshui is an agricultural land with uncontaminated environment and it still owns a well shaped ecosystem. However, due to more strict regulations in the more prosperous southern parts of Jiangsu province, chemical plants began moving to the relatively poor northern Jiangsu region. These chemical factories usually enjoyed the preferential treatment from the local Xiangshui government. Lacking or without strict regulation and supervision, these chemical plants brought pollution and environmental damage to the county. On November 27, 2007, an explosion occurred in one of the chemical factories in Chenjianggang Chemical Zone, with seven killed and many injured. On March 21, 2019, a major explosion occurred at a chemical plant in Chenjiagang Town. A total of 78 people were killed and more than 600 injured.

== Notable people ==
- Han Peixin, politician
- Huang Kuo-chu, writer
- Zhu Wenquan, general
