= List of universities and colleges in Jiangsu =

As of 2022, Jiangsu hosts 168 institutions of higher education, ranking first of all Chinese provinces. There are two Project 985, 11 Project 211, and 16 Double First Class universities in the province.

Name	Chinese name	Type	Location
Nanjing University	南京大学	National (Direct)	Nanjing
Soochow University	苏州大学	Provincial	Suzhou
Southeast University	东南大学	National (Direct)	Nanjing
Nanjing University of Aeronautics and Astronautics	南京航空航天大学	National (Other)	Nanjing
Nanjing University of Science and Technology	南京理工大学	National (Other)	Nanjing
China University of Mining and Technology	中国矿业大学	National (Direct)	Xuzhou
Nanjing Tech University	南京工业大学	Provincial	Nanjing
Changzhou University	常州大学	Provincial	Changzhou
Nanjing University of Posts and Telecommunications	南京邮电大学	Provincial	Nanjing
Hohai University	河海大学	National (Direct)	Nanjing
Jiangnan University	江南大学	National (Direct)	Wuxi
Nanjing Forestry University	南京林业大学	Provincial	Nanjing
Jiangsu University	江苏大学	Provincial	Zhenjiang
Nanjing University of Information Science and Technology	南京信息工程大学	Provincial	Nanjing
Nantong University	南通大学	Provincial	Nantong
Yancheng Institute of Technology	盐城工学院	Provincial	Yancheng
Nanjing Agricultural University	南京农业大学	National (Direct)	Nanjing
Nanjing Medical University	南京医科大学	Provincial	Nanjing
Xuzhou Medical University	徐州医科大学	Provincial	Xuzhou
Nanjing University of Chinese Medicine	南京中医药大学	Provincial	Nanjing
China Pharmaceutical University	中国药科大学	National (Direct)	Nanjing
Nanjing Normal University	南京师范大学	Provincial	Nanjing
Jiangsu Normal University	江苏师范大学	Provincial	Xuzhou
Huaiyin Normal University	淮阴师范学院	Provincial	Huai'an
Yancheng Teachers University	盐城师范学院	Provincial	Yancheng
Nanjing University of Finance and Economics	南京财经大学	Provincial	Nanjing
Jiangsu Police Institute	江苏警官学院	Provincial	Nanjing
Nanjing Sport Institute	南京体育学院	Provincial	Nanjing
Nanjing University of the Arts	南京艺术学院	Provincial	Nanjing
Suzhou University of Science and Technology	苏州科技大学	Provincial	Suzhou
Changshu Institute of Technology	常熟理工学院	Provincial	Suzhou
Huaiyin Institute of Technology	淮阴工学院	Provincial	Huai'an
Changzhou Institute of Technology	常州工学院	Municipal	Changzhou
Yangzhou University	扬州大学	Provincial	Yangzhou
Sanjiang University	三江学院	Private	Nanjing
Nanjing Institute of Technology	南京工程学院	Provincial	Nanjing
Nanjing Audit University	南京审计大学	Provincial	Nanjing
Nanjing Xiaozhuang University	南京晓庄学院	Municipal	Nanjing
Jiangsu University of Technology	江苏理工学院	Provincial	Nanjing
Huaihai Institute of Technology	淮海工学院	Provincial	Lianyungang
Xuzhou Institute of Technology	徐州工程学院	Municipal	Xuzhou
Nantong Institute of Technology	南通理工学院	Private	Nantong
Nanjing Forest Police College	南京森林警察学院	National (Other)	Nanjing
Chengxian College, Southeast University	东南大学成贤学院	Private	Nanjing
Taizhou University	泰州学院	Municipal	Taizhou
Taihu University of Wuxi	无锡太湖学院	Private	Wuxi
Jinling Institute of Technology	金陵科技学院	Municipal	Nanjing
Xuhai College, China University of Mining and Technology	中国矿业大学徐海学院	Private	Xuzhou
Ginling College, Nanjing Normal University	金陵女子大学	Private	Nanjing
Jinling College, Nanjing University	南京大学金陵学院	Private	Nanjing
Zijin College, Nanjing University of Science and Technology	南京理工大学紫金学院	Private	Nanjing
Jincheng College, Nanhang	南京航空航天大学金城学院	Private	Nanjing
Nanguang College, Communication University of China	中国传媒大学南广学院	Private	Nanjing
Taizhou Institute, Nanjing University of Science and Technology	南京理工大学泰州科技学院	Private	Taizhou
Taizhou College, Nanjing Normal University	南京师范大学泰州学院	Private	Taizhou
Pujiang Institute, Nanjing Tech University	南京工业大学浦江学院	Private	Nanjing
Zhongbei College, Nanjing Normal University	南京师范大学中北学院	Private	Nanjing
Kangda College, Nanjing Medical University	南京医科大学康达学院	Private	Lianyungang
Hanlin College, Nanjing University of Chinese Medicine	南京中医药大学翰林学院	Private	Taizhou
Binjiang College, Nanjing University of Information Science and Technology	南京信息工程大学滨江学院	Private	Nanjing
Wenzheng College, Soochow University	苏州大学文正学院	Private	Suzhou
Applied Technology College, Soochow University	苏州大学应用技术学院	Private	Suzhou
Tianping College, Suzhou University of Science and Technology	苏州科技大学天平学院	Private	Suzhou
Jingjiang College, Jiangsu University	江苏大学京江学院	Private	Zhenjiang
Guangling College, Yangzhou University	扬州大学广陵学院	Private	Yangzhou
Kewen College, Jiangsu Normal University	江苏师范大学科文学院	Private	Xuzhou
Tongda College, Nanjing University of Posts and Telecommunications	南京邮电大学通达学院	Private	Yangzhou
Hongshan College, Nanjing University of Finance and Economics	南京财经大学红山学院	Private	Zhenjiang
Huaide College, Changzhou University	常州大学怀德学院	Private	Taizhou
Xinglin College, Nantong University	南通大学杏林学院	Private	Nantong
Jinshen College, Nanjing Audit University	南京审计大学金审学院	Private	Nanjing
Suqian College	宿迁学院	Private	Suqian
Jiangsu Second Normal University	江苏第二师范学院	Provincial	Nanjing
Xi'an Jiaotong-Liverpool University	西交利物浦大学	Sino-foreign	Suzhou
Duke Kunshan University	昆山杜克大学	Sino-foreign	Suzhou
