= Mindlin =

Mindlin is a surname. Notable people with the surname include:

- Alexander Borisovich Mindlin (1929–2019), Russian engineer
- Gabriel B. Mindlin, Argentine physicist
- José Mindlin (1914–2010), Brazilian lawyer, businessperson, and bibliophile
- Raymond D. Mindlin (1906–1987), American mechanical engineer
