= Suqian College =

College in Jiangsu, China

Suqian College (Chinese: 宿迁学院) is a tertiary institution in Jiangsu, China. It was established in June 2002 under the people's Government of Jiangsu provincial approval, with support from Suqian. Suqian College is a leading private university mainly for the undergraduate study (with a few course-based master programs for adult school), exploring new educational model, sponsored by eight universities from the province - Jiangsu University, Soochow University, Yangzhou University, Nanjing University of Technology, Jiangsu Normal University, Nanjing University of Finance and Economics, Nanjing Normal University and Nanjing Tech University. The school motto is: Practical, Innovative, Cooperative and Dedicative.

The students and employees number more than 15,000. In June 2014, the Ministry of education of China sent a letter, formally approving Suqian College to accept students from out of provinces. The school enjoys a program of broad international cooperation and exchange, having signed a number of cooperative agreements with universities from the United States, Canada, South Korea, Italy, German, Singapore and New Zealand. The founding president is Mr. Suowang Ge, and the current president is Mr. Tiejun Min. The chairman is Bintai Wang (Former Minister of the Provincial Education Board). In 2020, 7000 students participated in its master's degree entry test.
