= Hokuriku University =

Private University in Kanazawa, Ishikawa, Japan

- 北陸大学
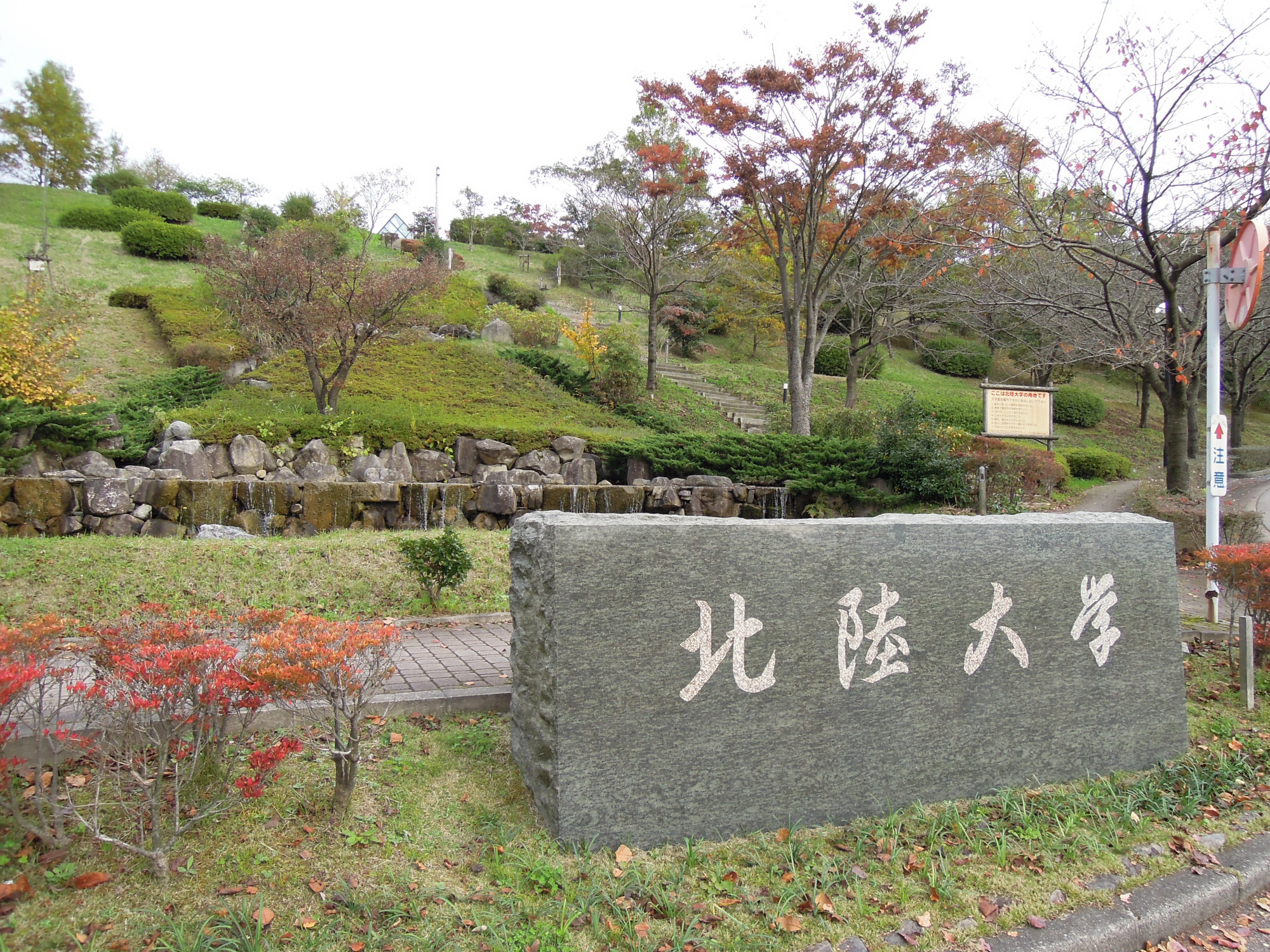
- Entrance to Hokuriku University
- Type: Private
- Established: April 1975
- Location: Kanazawa, Ishikawa, Japan; 36°31′31.5″N 136°42′26.9″E
- Nickname: Hokudai
- Location within Japan

Hokuriku University (北陸大学, Hokuriku Daigaku), abbreviated as Hokudai (北大), is a private university in Kanazawa, Ishikawa, Japan. The university is locally nicknamed Hokudai, though typically the term is used nationwide to refer to Hokkaido University.

== History ==
The university was founded in 1975 with a single faculty, the Faculty of Pharmaceutical Sciences. The Faculty of Foreign Languages and the Faculty of Law were established in 1987 and 1992, respectively.

The School of Future Learning was established in 2004. In 2017, it stopped accepting new students and was replaced by the Faculty of Economics and Management and the Faculty of International Communication. The Faculty of Health and Medical Sciences was also established that year.

The Graduate School of Pharmaceutical Sciences opened a master's programme in 1979 and a doctoral programme in 1983. It was discontinued in June 2014.

At the end of March 2005, Hokuriku University owned 4.44% of the outstanding stock in FM Tokyo.

== Academic organization ==
=== Faculties ===
The university has four faculties:

- Faculty of Pharmaceutical Sciences
- Faculty of Economics and Management
- Faculty of International Communication
- Faculty of Health and Medical Sciences

=== Facilities ===
- Real Video Education System, an on-demand video system for viewing and reviewing recorded lectures. Students can access RVES from any internet-connected computer.
- Hokudai/Cast: a trilingual podcast in English, Chinese, and Japanese; includes interviews, music (in Japanese, English, and Chinese), language learning segments, and an English 'Word for Today'; created by HU students and faculty. Also available on iTunes.
- Sound Track: the Hokuriku University gymnasium. It has a swimming pool, weight lifting room, sauna, and aerobics area.
- Library Centers
- Computing Services Center
- Center for the Advancement of Higher Education
- International Exchange Center coordinates the many exchange programs HU has with other schools (in Australia, England, the US and others), including a program where HU students can study English and Chinese in China (link is in Japanese). The IEC also coordinates Hokuriku University's Japanese Language Course for foreign students (link is in English).

== Sister/friendship institutions ==
=== Japan ===
- Kanazawa Medical University

=== South Korea ===
- Kyung Hee University
- Kyungnam University
- Daejeon University
- Dongguk University
- Sangmyung University

=== China ===
- Beijing University
- Beijing University of Chinese Medicine
- Beijing Language and Culture University
- Shanghai International Studies University
- Tianjin Foreign Studies University
- Shenyang Pharmaceutical University
- Liaoning Normal University
- Dalian University of Foreign Languages
- Soochow University
- Nanjing University
- Southeast University
- Nanjing Arts Institute
- Nanjing University of Finance and Economics
- Jiangsu Normal University
- Nanjing Agricultural University
- Heilongjiang University
- Yanbian University
- Northeast Normal University
- Zhenjiang Medical College
- Dalian University

=== Malaysia ===
- Universiti Tunku Abdul Rahman

=== Mongolia ===
- Mongolian University of the Humanities
- Mongolian Knowledge University
- Soyombo Management Institute
- Mandakh Institute of Accountancy

=== Taiwan ===
- Chinese Culture University
- Tamkang University
- Chienkuo University of Technology

=== Russian Federation ===
- Far Eastern Federal University
- Irkutsk State University
- Khabarovsk State Academy of Economics and Law
- Krasnojarsk University

=== Germany ===
- University of Trier

=== United Kingdom ===
- London Metropolitan University
- Bath Spa University

=== Spain ===
- Autonomous University of Madrid

=== United States ===
- University of California, Riverside
- Ohio University
- Georgetown University
- US Naval Academy
- University at Buffalo, The State University of New York
- University of Georgia
- Hawaii Pacific University

=== New Zealand ===
- Waikato University
- Massey University

=== Australia ===
- University of Wollongong
- Flinders University
- University of Melbourne

== Notable faculty ==
- Takao Abe: a former professor of the Faculty of Law and a former mayor of Kawasaki, Kanagawa.
