= Huangdun =

Huángdūn (黄墩) could refer to the following locations in China:

- Huangdun, Huaining County, town in southwestern Anhui
- Huangdun, Suqian, town in Suyu District, Suqian, Jiangsu
- Huangdun, Rizhao, town in Lanshan District, Rizhao, Shandong
