= Jiangsu Normal School =

Jiangsu Normal School may refer to:

- Jiangsu Normal University (江苏师范大学)
- Suzhou High School, formerly known as Jiangsu Normal School (江苏师范学堂)
