= Ye Keming =

Chinese engineer (1937–2021)

- 叶可明
- Born: 28 March 1937; Jinshan County, Shanghai, Republic of China
- Died: 5 October 2021 (aged 84); Huadong Hospital, Shanghai, People's Republic of China
- Education: Suzhou University of Science and Technology; Tongji University
- Scientific career
- Fields: Architectural engineering Civil engineering
- Workplaces: Shanghai Construction Group

Chinese name
- Simplified Chinese: 叶可明
- Traditional Chinese: 葉可明
Transcriptions
Standard Mandarin
- Hanyu Pinyin: Yè Kěmíng

Ye Keming (28 March 1937 – 5 October 2021) was a Chinese engineer who was chief engineer at Shanghai Construction Group, and an academician of the Chinese Academy of Engineering.

== Biography ==
Ye was born in Jinshan County, Shanghai, on 28 March 1937, during the Republic of China. After graduating from Suzhou Construction Engineering School (now Suzhou University of Science and Technology) in 1956, he attended Tongji University, where he majored in industrial and civil buildings.

From January 1957 to January 1977, Ye worked at the Shanghai No. 5 Construction Engineering Co., Ltd. as deputy chief engineer. He joined the Chinese Communist Party in January 1965. In January 1977, he was sent to Albania as leader of Civil Engineering Team of Metallurgical Experts from China to Albania. One year later, he returned to China and became director of Technology Department of Baosteel Group. In January 1981, he continued to work at the Shanghai No. 5 Construction Engineering Co., Ltd. and then moved to the Shanghai No. 8 Construction Engineering Co., Ltd.. In January 1987, he was appointed deputy chief engineer at Shanghai Construction Group, becoming vice chairman in January 1994 and senior engineer in January 1998.

On 5 October 2021, he died of an illness at Huadong Hospital, in Shanghai, aged 84.

== Contributions ==
Ye had been engaged in civil engineering construction technology and management for a long time. He had chaired the construction of Nanpu Bridge, Yangpu Bridge, Oriental Pearl Tower and Jin Mao Tower, and participated in scientific research and talent training of national key projects such as Runyang Yangtze River Bridge, Sutong Bridge and Hong Kong–Zhuhai–Macau Bridge.

== Honours and awards ==
- 1995 State Science and Technology Progress Award (First Class) for building Nanpu Bridge
- 1995 Member of the Chinese Academy of Engineering (CAE)
- 1996 State Science and Technology Progress Award (Second Class) for research and application of construction technology and equipment of Oriental Pearl Tower
