= Hokudai =

Hokudai may refer to:

- Hokkaido University
- Hokuriku University
- Tohoku University
