= Saint Petersburg Electrotechnical University =

Public university in Saint Petersburg, Russia

Coordinates: 59°58′21″N 30°19′21″E

Saint Petersburg Electrotechnical University "LETI"
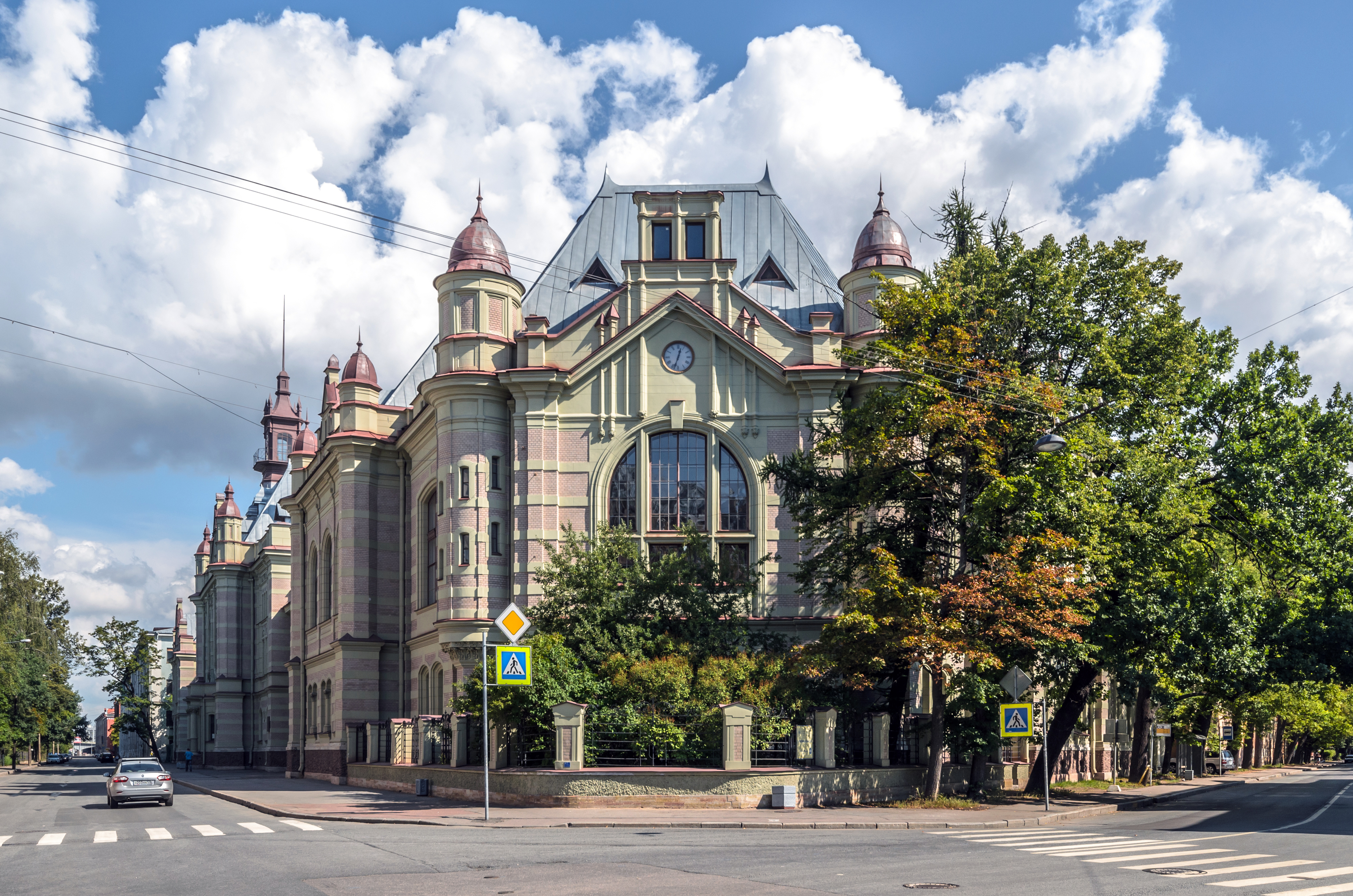
- Type: Public
- Established: 1886
- Rector: Viktor Sheludko
- Students: 9,000
- Location: ul. Professora Popova 5, 197376, Saint Petersburg, Russian Federation
- Website: https://etu.ru/en/university
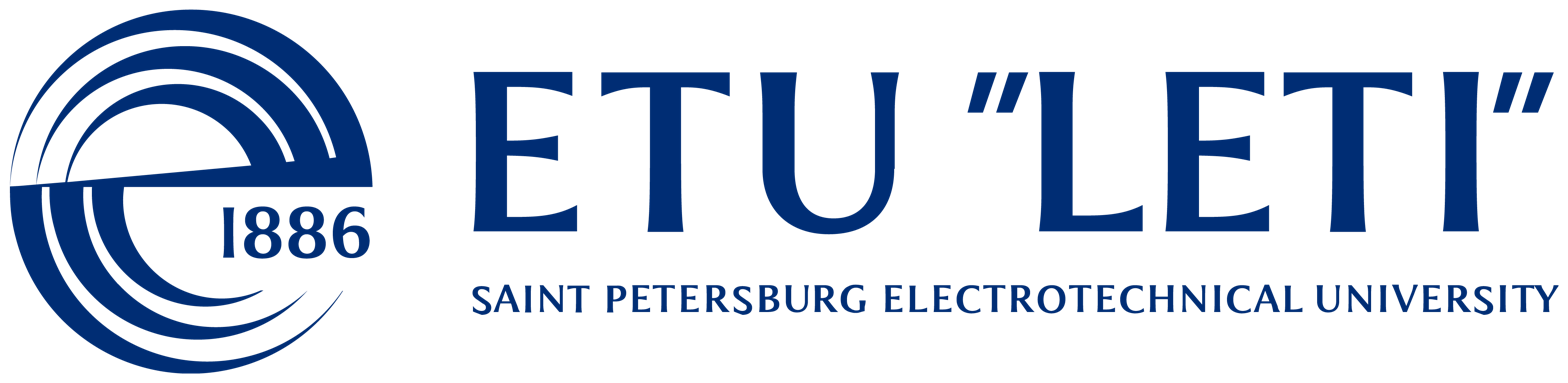

University rankings

Global – Overall
- QS World: 751-800 (2023)
- THE World: 1,201 (2022)

Regional – Overall
- QS Emerging Europe and Central Asia: 150 (2022)

Saint Petersburg Electrotechnical University "LETI" (ETU or ETU "LETI"; Russian: Санкт-Петербургский государственный электротехнический университет «ЛЭТИ» им. В.И. Ульянова (Ленина), СПбГЭТУ «ЛЭТИ») is a public university. It was founded in 1886 as a Technical College. LETI, as it is popularly called, received the status of a higher education institution in 1899 and became known as Electrotechnical Institute. The University has programs in fields of radio engineering, telecommunications, control processes, computer engineering and IT, electronics, biomedical engineering, management, and linguistics.

In August 2016 ETU “LETI” became the part of the Project 5-100, a Russian academic excellence program seeking to bring five Russian universities into the top 100 in world rankings.

In 2023, the university was ranked #751-800 in the world by QS World University Rankings, and in 2022 it was ranked #1,201 by Times Higher Education World University Rankings.

Viktor Sheludko (Шелудько Виктор Николаевич), the rector of the Saint Petersburg Electrotechnical University has signed a letter of support for the Russian invasion of Ukraine.

== History ==
Count Dmitry Tolstoy, Minister of Interior, submitted a draft of Provisional Regulations to the State Council and the staff of the Technical College. In 1886, Emperor Alexander III approved of the Provisional Regulations on the Technical College with a three-year term of study. On September 4, 1886, Technical College of the Postal and Telegraph Department was opened. Nikolai Pisarevsky, an engineer in the field of electrical communications, became the director of the school. The building of the former Telegraph Department (Novo-Isaakievskaya 18, now Yakubovicha Street) was allocated for the needs of the college. On June 11 (23), 1891, Emperor Alexander III signed a decree and renamed Technical College as Electrotechnical Institute (ETI) with a four-year term of study.

After Pisarevsky died in 1895, Nikolai Kachalov became the head of the institute. On June 4 (16), 1899, ETI was granted the status of a higher education institution with the introduction of a five-year training period. In August 1899, Emperor Nicholas II issued an order to rename the institute in memory of its "unforgettable founder", Alexander III as Electrotechnical Institute of Emperor Alexander III.

It was decided to construct a group of buildings for the Institute on Aptekarsky Island. ETI moved to the new location in 1903. Alexander Popov became the first elected director of the institute in September 1905.

=== After the revolution ===
Prof. Valentin Kovalenkov and Prof. Nikolai Scritsky introduced a new Telemechanics major. Later the Department of Automation and Telemechanics was founded.

During the Second World War, many academic and administrative staff members, as well as students of the Institute went to the front. When Leningrad was besieged, a group of scientists led by Prof. Sergei Rinkevich remained there. In April 1942, Rinkevich helped establish the Research Bureau affiliated to the People's Commissariat of the Shipbuilding Industry that carried out special tasks to ensure the defense of Leningrad. Prof. A. Alekseev organized welding works on Lake Ladoga. He repaired metal parts of berths and vessels utilized on the Road of Life. A monument dedicated to students and employees of LETI who died in the Great Patriotic War was erected on Instrumentalnaya Street on November 5, 1986.

In 1992, the institute received the status of a Technical University. In 1998, the Ugra branch of ETU “LETI” (Yugorsk, Khanty-Mansi Autonomous Okrug) was opened.

=== Today ===
Bachelors, masters, and specialists receive training at 7 full-time faculties.

ETU is preparing students in:

- Bachelor's degree
- Master's degree
- Specialist degree

Scientific personnel receive training in 43 scientific specialties. Currently, 234 graduate students are studying at ETU. The university has 9 dissertation councils in 23 scientific specialties. More than 50 people finish post-graduate study every year. About 9226 students and postgraduates are studying at ETU at the moment. The university has 3 full members and 5 corresponding members of the Russian Academy of Sciences, 20 laureates of national and international awards, more than 220 professors and doctors of science. University has more than 2,000 graduates on main educational programs annually.

Among foreign partners of the university are 160 universities from 75 countries.

The university took the 8th place among technical universities of Russia and the 2nd place among technical universities of St. Petersburg in the ranking of the demand for universities in Russia. In 2018, ETU took the 5th place among the technical universities of Russia and the 2nd place among the technical universities of St. Petersburg in monitoring the quality of admission to universities. ETU "LETI" takes the 1st place among technical universities of St. Petersburg on monitoring the employment of graduates.

== Rankings ==
In 2023, the university was ranked #751-800 in the world by QS World University Rankings, and in 2022 it was ranked #1,201 by Times Higher Education World University Rankings.

== International cooperation ==
ETU LETI has partnership cooperation in education with 82 universities in 29 countries. University offers several Joint and Double-diploma programs such as Joint bachelor's program with Xuzhou Institute of Technology, Double-diploma program with Lappeenranta University of Technology and TU Ilmenau.

== Names ==
1886-1891 – Technical College of the Post and Telegraph Department

1891-1898 – Electrotechnical Institute

1898-1917 – Electrotechnical Institute of Emperor Alexander III

1918-1992 – Electrotechnical Institute named after V.I. Ulyanov (Lenin)

1992-1998 – Saint Petersburg Electrotechnical University

Since 1998 – Saint Petersburg Electrotechnical University "LETI"

=== Official names ===
- Saint Petersburg Electrotechnical University "LETI"
- ETU
- Санкт-Петербургский государственный электротехнический университет «ЛЭТИ» им. В.И. Ульянова (Ленина)
- СПбГЭТУ «ЛЭТИ»

== Notable alumni ==
- Zhores Alferov, physicist and academic, shared the 2000 Nobel Prize in Physics for the development of the semiconductor heterojunction for optoelectronics, politician
- Dmitry Astrakhan, film director and actor
- Valery Golubev, politician and businessman
- Konstantin Khrenov, engineer and inventor
- Vladimir Kozhin, politician and businessman
- Alexander Borisovich Mindlin, engineer and author
- Alexei Mishin, pair skater and figure skating coach
- Peter Mostovoy, Russian-Israeli filmmaker
