= Daxing, Jiangsu =

Daxing 大兴镇
- Town
- Location in Jiangsu
- Coordinates: 33°54′12″N 118°29′29″E
- Country: People's Republic of China
- Province: Jiangsu
- Prefecture-level city: Suqian
- District: Suyu District
- Time zone: UTC+8 (China Standard)

Daxing (simplified Chinese: 大兴; traditional Chinese: 大興; pinyin: Dàxīng) is a town under the administration of Suyu District, Suqian, Jiangsu, China. As of 2018, it has 3 residential communities and 14 villages under its administration.
