= Huaihai =

Huaihai may refer to:

- Huaihai Economic Zone, centered around Xuzhou, Jiangsu, China
- Baizhang Huaihai (720–814), Chinese Zen master
- Huaihai Campaign, 1948–1949 military action during the Chinese Civil War
- Huaihai Institute of Technology, institute in Lianyungang, Jiangsu, China
- Huaihai opera, traditional Chinese theatre
- Huaihai Road, street in Shanghai, China
