= Jinling College =

Jinling College may refer to:

- Ginling College, also romanized as Jinling
- Jinling College, Nanjing University
