= Xuzhou University of Technology =

University in Xuzhou, China

Coordinates: 34.21377°N 117.21552°E

- Type: Public university
- Established: 2005
- President: Han Baoping
- Academic staff: 1,095 (2010)
- Undergraduates: 18,000 (2010)
- Location: Xuzhou, Jiangsu, People's Republic of China
- Website: www.xzit.edu.cn

The Xuzhou University of Technology (徐州工程学院; 'Xuzhou Engineering College'), formerly Xuzhou Institute of Technology, is a municipal public college located in Xuzhou, Jiangsu, China. The college is affiliated with and sponsored by the City of Xuzhou.

Previously holding vocational technical college status, the institution was granted college status in 2005. Despite its English name, the institution has not yet been granted university status.

The college was established in 2002 through the merger of Pengcheng Vocational University, founded in 1983, and Xuzhou Economic and Management Cadre College, founded in 1985. On March 9, 2005, with the approval of the Ministry of Education, the school was upgraded to a college-standing undergraduate institution. On June 22, 2007, Xuzhou Education College, founded in 1959, was integrated into the institute.

== Main Campuses ==
- The campus south of the city (main campus): 3rd Ring Road, Quanshan District
- Central campus (new campus): Xincheng District
- Other campuses: Feihong Campus, Xiyuan Campus, Yongan Campus, Hubin Campus

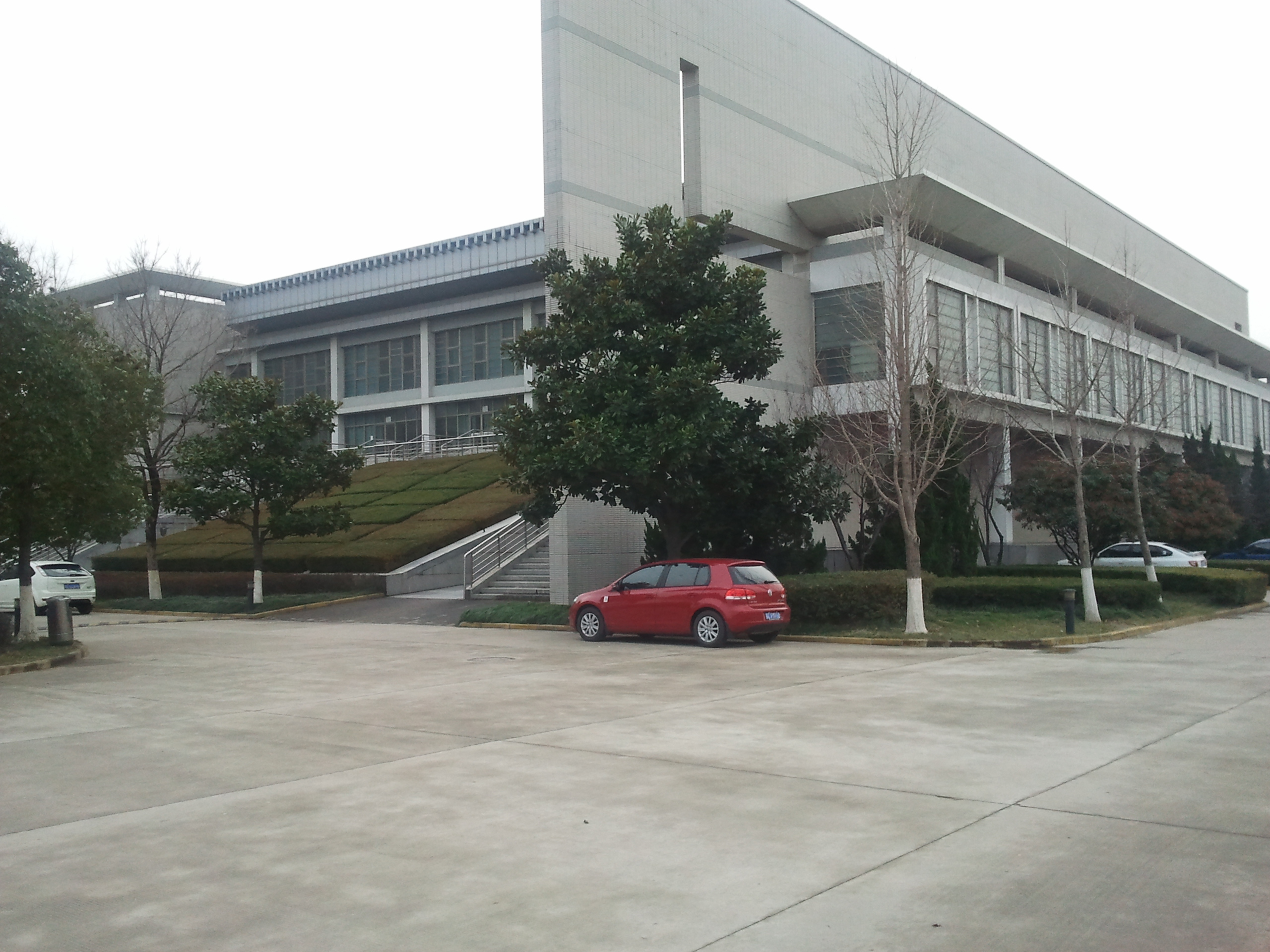
Campus of Xuzhou University of Technology

== History ==
Having got the permission from Ministry of Education and the Jiangsu Provincial Government, Pengcheng Vocational University was merged with Xuzhou Economic Management Cadre College and then became Xuzhou University of Technology in March 2005. In June 2007, Xuzhou Normal Academy founded in 1959 was merged into it. The Chinese ministry of Education granted permission for the school to become a Full-time undergraduate college. This allowed the university to become a comprehensive university with specializations in engineering and sciences. This university was awarded as Garden-like School Advanced Collective award and some other prizes by the local government. The development of the Center campus was another very important milestone. Now it has several campuses which cover about 2035 acres with fixed assets worth 0.8 billion yuan and teaching equipment worth 120 million yuan.

== Today ==
As a college established by both the province and the municipality, Xuzhou University of Technology has more space to make a further development and has established a strong relationship with Xuzhou Normal University, Xuzhou Medical College, China University of Mining and Technology, and Xuzhou Corps Command College. This university is aimed to cultivate talents who develop in an all-around way. Making constant efforts to improve the teaching quality and comprehensive strength makes it continue to rise in college rankings. Besides, the discipline structure is more rational, dominant disciplines are more obvious, and it has been trying its best to achieve a higher task.

== The Library ==
The library in Xuzhou University of Technology consists of the main library and the branch libraries of Center campus, occupying an area of 25,208 square metres equipped with more than 2000 seats. The main library located in the south of Xuzhou is designed by a famous architect-Qi Kang, an academician of the Chinese Academy of Engineering. Its architectural style is with a solemn atmosphere. In the library, all things are laid out rationally and suitably with recreational Facilities. All the documents are arranged according to the settings of subjects, adopting a service pattern of borrowing and reading integration, thus improving the work and service efficiency of the library, which reflects the concept of people first.

At present, the library has about 800,000 books, and has been an integrated library system including books, magazines, newspaper, video products, computer files and so on. The first floor hall is equipped with corridors for professors, building an atmosphere of showing respect to teachers and attaching great importance to education.

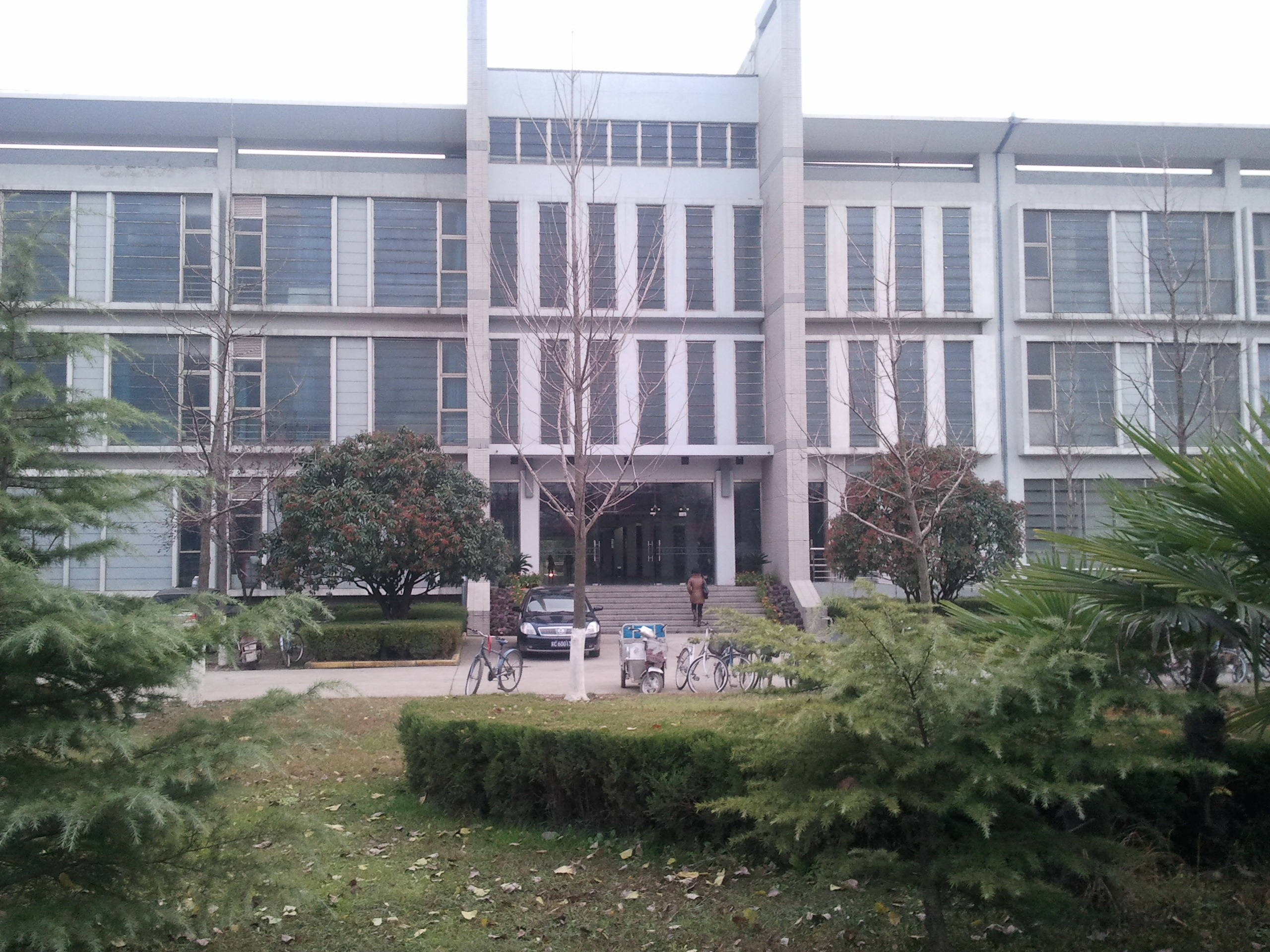
The library of Xuzhou Institute of Technology

== Teaching staff ==
The college now has 1095 full-time teachers, including 69 professors, 330 associate professors, 408 masters and 157 doctors. Among them, three are external academicians, one is a judge of the State science and technology prizes, and three are awarded second grade professors. Five experts receive the Government Allowance. Now, the school has established 32 labs, 10 research institutes, 1 training center for engineering education, 3 Professional practice bases and more than 180 practice bases outside school. The teaching team of construction budget is provincial excellent teaching team. Besides, the experimental center for Food and Biological engineering, the experimental center for Electrical and Electronic Engineering, and the experimental center for physics are construction points for provincial teaching demonstration centres.

== Schools and Departments ==
- Schools of Economics
  - Economics; International Trade and commerce; Electronic Commerce; Finance and Revenue; Economic Law; Investment and Financing
- Education Science and Technology Institute
  - Elementary School Education; Chinese Education; Educational Technology; Education; Psychology; Modern Educational Technology
- Physical Culture Institute
- College of Humanities
  - Chinese Language and Literature; Advertising
- Foreign Language Department
- School of Arts
  - Artistic Design; Clothing Design and Engineering; Animated drawing [cartoon]; Musicology
- Mathematics and Physicals Science Technology
  - Information and Computing Science;Applied Physics; Electronic Science and Technology
- School of Chemistry and Chemical Engineering
  - Applied chemistry; Chemical Engineering and Technology
- Department of Information and Electrical Engineering
  - Electrical Engineering and the Automatization Specialty; Computer Science and Technology; Electronic Information Science and Technology;
- Mechanical and Electrical Engineering Institute
  - Mechanical Design and Manufacturing Automation; Industrial Design Education; Material Forming and Control Engineering; Numerical Control Technique; Polymer Materials Science and Engineering
- Civil Engineering Department
  - Civil Engineering; Professional Engineering Management; Construction Management; Construction Engineering Technology
- School of Environment Engineering
  - Landscape Architecture; Water Supply and Sewerage Work
- College of Food Science and Biotechnology
  - Biological Engineering; Food Science and Engineering
- School of Management
  - Marketing Management; Accounting; Financial Management; Tourism Management; Logisticis Engineering; Information Management and Information System; Engineering Management

== Academic Journals ==
- Natural Science Edition

Quality	comprehensive journal
Main columns	warship and social development, the culture of Han dynasty
Aim	Serve others, Promote science, Develop education
Governing Unit	Xuzhou government
Host unit	Xuzhou University of Technology
Chief editor	Liu Yanqing
ISSN	1673-0704
CN	32-1744/Z
Postalcode	221008

- Social Science Edition

Quality	comprehensive
Main column	research on Huo Qiubai, research on Jin Ping Mei, research on the culture of Chu Han
Governing Unit	Department of Education of Jiangsu Province
Host unit	Xuzhou University of Technology
Chief editor	Han Baoping
ISSN	1674-3571
CN	32-1744/Z
Postalcode	221008
