= Konstantin Khrenov =

Soviet engineer and inventor

Konstantin Konstantinovich Khrenov
- Born: Константин Константинович Хренов; 13 February 1894; Borovsk, Russian Empire
- Died: 12 October 1984 (aged 90); Kiev, Soviet Union
- Education: Saint Petersburg State Electrotechnical University
- Occupation(s): Engineer, professor
- Known for: Inventor of underwater welding
- Awards: Order of Lenin; Order of the October Revolution; State Stalin Prize; USSR State Prize

Konstantin Konstantinovich Khrenov (Russian: Константин Константинович Хренов; 13 February 1894 – 12 October 1984) was a Soviet engineer and inventor who in 1932 introduced underwater welding and cutting of metals. For this method, extensively used by the Soviet Navy during World War II, Khrenov was awarded the State Stalin Prize in 1946.

== Biography ==
Khrenov was born in 1894 in Borovsk, a town in Kaluga Oblast, Russia, located just south from its border with the Moscow Oblast. In 1918, he graduated from the department of electrochemistry of Saint Petersburg State Electrotechnical University (ETU). After graduation, he continued his research at ETU and worked there as a lecturer between 1921 and 1925. He then moved to Moscow and between 1928 and 1947 was teaching at the Moscow Institute of Electromechanical Engineering (Railway Transport); in 1933 he became a professor there. In parallel, between 1931 and 1947 Khrenov was teaching at the Bauman Moscow State Technical University – one of the oldest and largest Russian technical universities.

In the 1940s, Khrenov moved to Ukraine where he assumed professor positions at the following institutions:

- 1945–48 – Institute of Electric Welding
- 1948–1952 – Institute of Structural Mechanics
- 1952–1963 – Institute of Electrical Engineering
- 1947–1958 – Kiev Polytechnic Institute
- 1963–till retirement – Institute of Electric Welding.

== Achievements ==
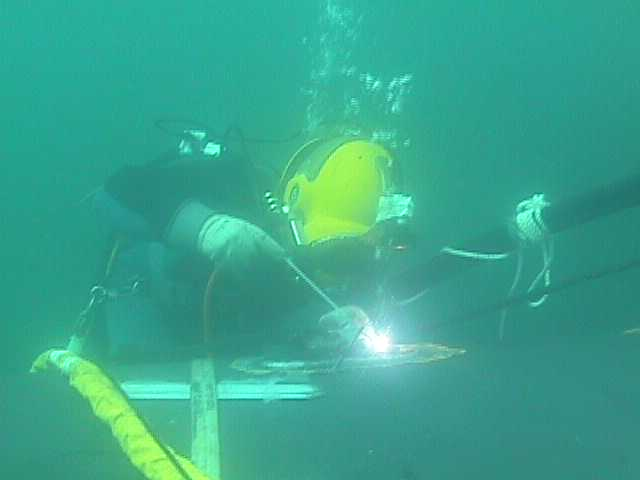
A modern underwater welding

Khrenov dedicated his entire career to the development of welding techniques and equipment. He invented methods of electric welding and cutting metals under water, designed power sources for arc and spot welding, ceramic fluxes, electrode coatings, methods of cold pressure welding, diffusion welding, plasma cutting and many others. His breakthrough achievement was development of the electrodes for underwater welding in 1932. Their successful test at the Black Sea in the same year was the first practical realization of underwater welding. In this method, the gas bubbles formed as a result of welding reactions were generating a stable flow which shielded the arc from water. Underwater welding had quickly found practical application and already in 1936–1938 was used in the lifting of the ship Boris sunk in the Black Sea, as well as in the repair of bridges and other ships, especially during World War II.

== Awards ==
For his pioneering work in underwater welding, Khrenov was awarded the State Stalin Prize in 1946. He was elected a member of the National Academy of Sciences of Ukraine and of the Russian Academy of Sciences in 1945 and 1953, respectively. His lifetime achievements were later acknowledged by the Council of Ministers (Soviet Union) Prize (1982), and USSR State Prize (1986, posthumously). His other decorations include Order of Lenin, Order of the October Revolution and several other lesser orders.

== Books ==
- Хренов К. К., Ярхо В. И. Технология дуговой электросварки (Technology of electric arc welding, 1080 pages). М.-Л.: 1940.
- Хренов К. К. Подводная электрическая сварка и резка металлов. М.: 1946.
- Хренов К. К., Назаров Т. С. Автоматическая дуговая электросварка, Гос. научно-тех. изд-во машиностроит. лит-ры, 1949 (273 pages)
- Хренов К. К. Электрическая сварочная дуга. Киев М.: 1949.
- Хренов К. К. Сварка, резка и пайка металлов. Киев М.: 1952.
- Хренов К. К., Кушнарев Д. М. Керамические флюсы для автоматической дуговой сварки. Киев: 1954.
- Хренов К. К. Сварка, резка и пайка металлов, Машгиз, 1959 (415 pages)
- Хренов К. К. Сварка, резка и пайка металлов, 4 изд., М., Машиностроение 1973 (407 pages).

== See also ==
- List of Russian inventors
