= Sucheng, Suqian =

Sucheng 宿城区
- District
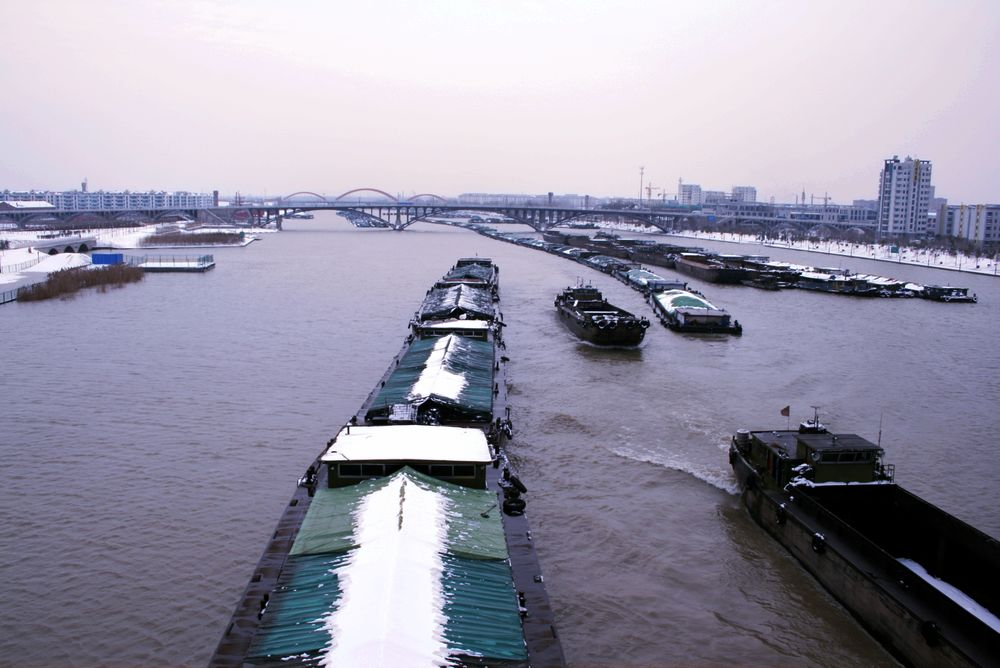

- Location in Jiangsu
- Coordinates: 33°56′35″N 118°17′44″E
- Country: People's Republic of China
- Province: Jiangsu
- Prefecture-level city: Suqian

Area
  - Total: 854 km^{2} (330 sq mi)

Population (2019)
  - Total: 740,800
  - Density: 867/km^{2} (2,250/sq mi)
- Time zone: UTC+8 (China Standard)
- Postal code: 223800

Sucheng District (simplified Chinese: 宿城区; traditional Chinese: 宿城區; pinyin: Sùchéng Qū) is one of two districts of Suqian, Jiangsu province, China.

== Administrative divisions ==
At present, Sucheng District has 6 subdistricts, 10 towns and 4 townships.

6 subdistricts

- Xingfu (幸福街道)
- Shunli (项里街道)
- Hebin (河滨街道)
- Gucheng (古城街道)
- Huanghe (黄河街道)
- Guchu (古楚街道)

10 towns

- Shuangzhuang (双庄镇)
- Gengche (耿车镇)
- Buzi (埠子镇)
- Longhe (龙河镇)
- Yangbei (洋北镇)
- Cangji (仓集镇)
- Yanghe (洋河镇)
- Zhongyang (中杨镇)
- Zhenglou (郑楼镇)
- Chenji (陈集镇)

4 townships

- Sankeshu (三棵树乡)
- Luowei (罗圩乡)
- Nancai (南蔡乡)
- Tuyuan (屠园乡)
