= Li Beiqun =

President Of Nanjing University

President of Nanjing University of Information Science and Technology
- Incumbent
- Assumed office 2018

Personal details
- Born: 1969 (age 56–57) Xinyi, Jiangsu, China
- Education: Nanjing University
- Profession: University President
- Scientific career
- Education: Nanjing University
- Fields: Higher education
- Workplaces: Nanjing University of Information Science and Technology
- Thesis: (2011)

Li Beiqun is currently President of Nanjing University of Information Science and Technology, located in Nanjing, China. Under his leadership, the university saw a drop in the international ranking consistently for four consecutive years in 2021, 2022, 2023 and 2024.

== Early life ==
Li was born in 1969 in Xinyi, Jiangsu province, China. In 1991, he received his bachelor's degree in climatology from Nanjing University. He then received his master's degree and Ph.D. degrees in higher education from the same university in 1998 and 2011 respectively.

== Career ==
From 1999 to 2001, he was assistant director of the Office of President, Nanjing University of Information Science and Technology. From 2001 to 2010, he assumed various administrative roles at the university, at planning, higher education and capital construction departments. From 2010 to 2014, he became a vice president of the university. In 2017. he was appointed president. In 2018, he led in the formation of a graduate school and research institute at Wuxi, China. He also led the university in collaborating with the University of Bahamas.

== Awards ==
In 2011, he received the Jiangsu Prize in teaching achievement for higher education. In 2014, he received the first prize in national teaching achievement.
