= Nantong University =

Provincial public university in Nantong, Jiangsu, China

- Motto in English: Bridging China and the West, Striving for the Best
- Established: 1912
- President: Shi Weidong
- Students: 30,000
- Undergraduates: 25,000+
- Location: Nantong, Jiangsu, China
- Website: en.ntu.edu.cn

Nantong University (南通大学) is a provincial public university in Nantong, Jiangsu, China. It is affiliated with the Province of Jiangsu and co-funded by the Jiangsu Provincial People's Government and the Ministry of Transport.

The university's earliest predecessor was established in 1912. It occupies 4,000 acres and have 800 thousand square meters used for school buildings.

Nantong is comprehensive university constructed by Jiangsu Provincial Government and the state Ministry of Transport. It is composed of three parts, Nantong Medical College, Nantong Engineering College and Nantong Normal College and has four campuses: the new campus, Qixiu campus, Zhongxiu campus and Qidong campus.

The enrollment is nearly 34 thousand full-time students, among whom 1,550 are graduates and 300 are oversea students. The university has 84 undergraduate programs based on nine major disciplines, which are literature, science, engineering, medical science, education, economics, law, history and management.

The Nantong University is accredited and approved by MCI (Medical Council of India) and WHO (World Health Organization).

== Vision and Mission ==
The Nantong University's motto is to Bridging China and the West, Striving for the Best and The Mission of the university is to be the Learning Must be Expected to Be Used, and the Use Must be Suitable for Its Local Community, and the value of University is Beautiful Morality and Pure Science.

== Facts and figures ==
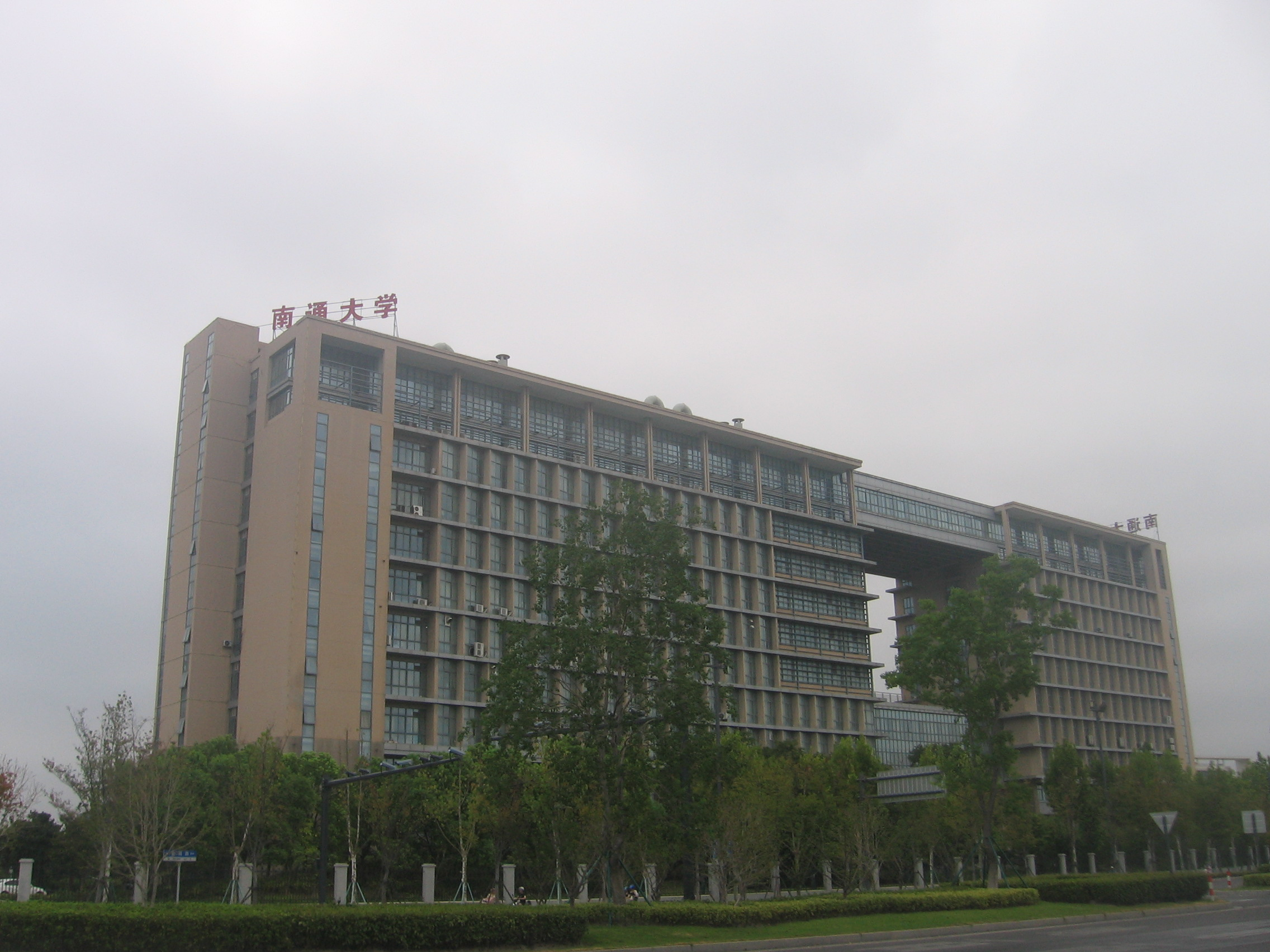
Nantong University

1. Undergraduates: - About 40,000
2. Postgraduates: - About 2700
3. Overseas Students with Academic Degrees: - 750
4. Affiliated Hospital: - 1
5. Undergraduate Program: - 106
6. Doctor Station: - 3
7. Doctoral Degree Programs of Level I Academic Disciplines: - 3
8. Master's degree Programs of Level I Academic Disciplines: - 22
9. Majors For Professionals master's degree: - 12
10. Cuaa.Net Rankings (Universities in China): - 100
11. Faculty & Staff: - 3,152
12. Senior Faculty: - 1,549

== Schools ==
- School of Mechanical Engineering
- School of transportation and Civil Engineering
- School of International Education
- School of Chinese Culture and Literature
- School of Foreign Language
- School of Medicine
- School of Pharmacy
- School of Politics
- School of Chemistry and Chemical Industry
- School of Science
- School of Art
- School of Education Science
- School of Information Science and Technology
- Institute of Traffic
