= Nanjing University of Information Science and Technology =

Provincial public university in Nanjing, Jiangsu, China

Coordinates: 32°12′26″N 118°43′18″E

- 南京信息工程大学
- Former name: Nanjing Institute of Meteorology
- Type: Public university
- Established: 1960; 66 years ago
- President: Li Beiqun
- Location: Ningliu Road, Nanjing, Jiangsu Province, P.R.C. 210044, Nanjing, Jiangsu, China
- Website: www.nuist.edu.cn

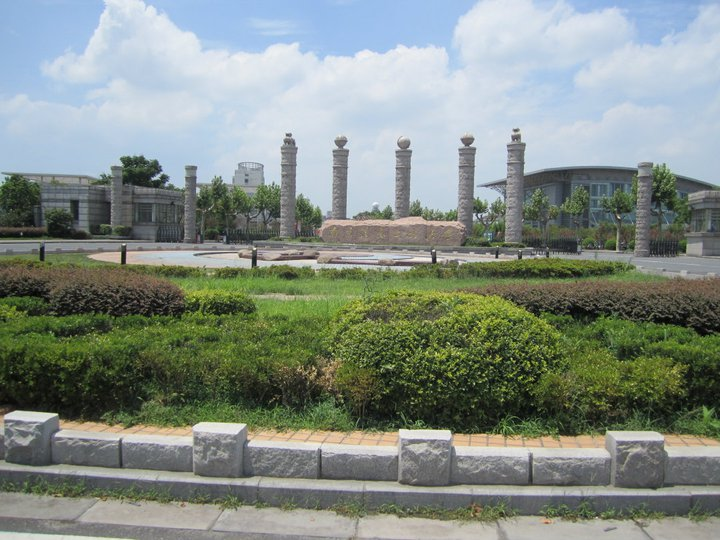
NUIST main entrance gate

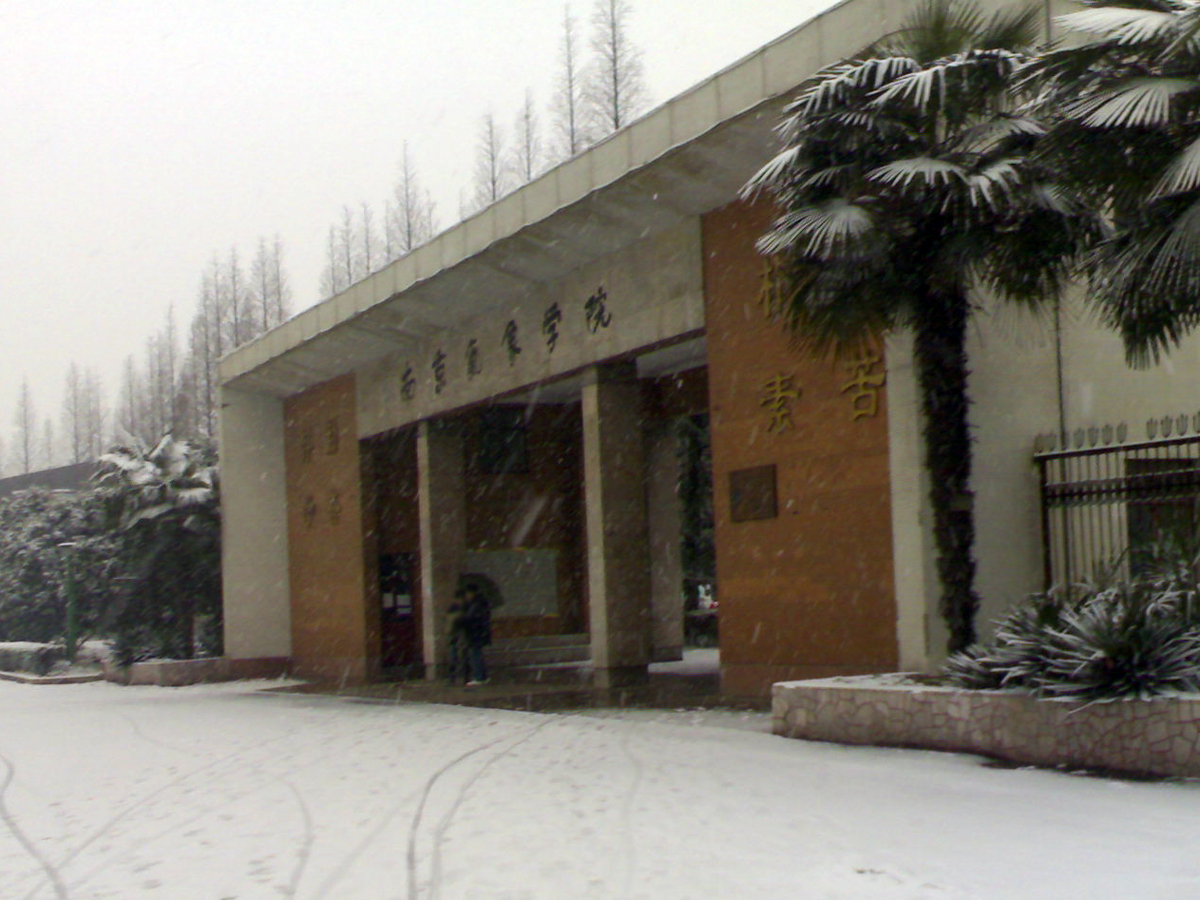
Nanjing Meteorological Institute (南京气象学院旧门)

The Nanjing University of Information Science and Technology (NUIST; 南京信息工程大学) is a provincial public university in Nanjing, Jiangsu, China. It is affiliated with the province of Jiangsu. The university is part of the Double First-Class Construction.

The university is well known for meteorology research and education.

The international ranking of the university has consistently declined for four consecutive years in 2021, 2022, 2023 and 2024. The university is involved in multiple lawsuits, including the one in which it was awarded penalty by the local court.

== History ==
NUIST was formerly the Meteorology College of Nanjing University, was established in 1960 by the China Meteorological Administration, then changed the name into Nanjing Institute of Meteorology in May 1963. NUIST is the oldest institution of higher learning of meteorology science in China.

The administration of NUIST was handed over from China Meteorological Administration to Jiangsu province in February 2000. Its present name of Nanjing University of Information Science and Technology (NUIST) was adopted in May 2004 with authorization by Jiangsu Government and the Ministry of Education of PRC.

The university is particularly well known in China for renaming old and established departments to new ones to cash on sensation and hype. Following the Facebook's change of its name to Meta in a major rebranding, China saw a surge of interest in metaverse. In 2022, NUIST, with no known strengths in metaverse or 3D games, renamed its Department of Information Engineering to the Department of Metaverse just to become China's "first metaverse institution." The critics argued it to be an attempt to cash on sensation and hype. The move was criticised by China Daily, the country's leading English newspaper, who argued that "the education and research of these departments with fashionable names are no different from before."

== Programs ==
NUIST offers Associate, Bachelor, Master and Doctorate degree programs in areas including Atmospheric Science, Environmental Science, Engineering, management, literature, economics, laws and agriculture. It is part of the Double First-Class Construction, with Double First Class status in certain disciplines. Before 2004 some students were free of tuition if they agreed to work for China Meteorological Administration when entering the school and they will start to work for CMA by the fourth year of school while possible getting credentials as well.

At Autumn 2013 more than 200 foreign students from 43 countries were studying at NUIST.

== Colleges and departments ==
- Binjiang College
- College of Adult Education
- College of English Department
- Technical College for Professional Training
- Reading Academy
- School of Business
- Yue Jiang Academy
- Foreign Languages Department
- College of International Education – CIE (for foreign students)
- Department of Atmospheric Science
- Department of Mathematics and Statistics
- Department of Applied Meteorological Science
- Department of Physics and Optoelectronic Engineering
- Department of Computer Science and Technology
- Department of Electronic Engineering
- Department of Law
- Department of Public Administration
- Department of Environmental Science and Engineering
- Department of Economics and Trade
- Department of Spatial Information Science
- Department of Information Management
- Department of Information and Communications Technologies
- Department of Chinese Language and Literature
- Department of Resource, Environment and City-rural Planning

== Scholarships and awards ==
NUIST offers many types of scholarships for local and international students. It is one of the only two universities to offer the Chinese Government Scholarship-WMO Program. This is a specialized scholarship offered to students of meteorology or related fields. The only other university offering this scholarship is Hohai University.

== Achievements ==
- In 1972, three students of NUIST climbed Mount Everest. One of them set a record by climbing its north summit three times.
- In 2020, the most accurate measurement of the height of Mount Everest was made by a joint team of China and Nepal. Two alumni of NUIST provided weather forecast and other critical support to the team. NUIST also provided technical support to the team.
- In 2021, the first academic study on Dual circulation was published by a team of researchers from NUIST.

== External Partnership ==
The school has the scholarships from Chinese government, Hanban, the Jiangsu province to recruit students. In 2009, the school was founded the "Confucius class" in Bahamas, and it became the fourth Confucius class that Jiangsu Province has found in overseas universities, in 2011, "Confucius class" successfully upgraded to "Confucius Institute". The school has a "World Meteorological Organization Regional Training Center", which has trained more than 1,600 meteorological technicians and managers for 134 countries and regions, and successfully hosted the Tenth World Meteorological Organization Conference of Education and Training and the third session of "quantitative precipitation estimation and forecasting" international conference. In 2010, the World Meteorological Organization Executive Council session on 62 certificates in recognition of the important contribution of the school to make the international meteorological training. In 2015, the NUIST-Reading University (UK) Academy was jointly established, offering courses in pure sciences and social sciences.
