= Suyu, Suqian =

Suyu 宿豫区
- District
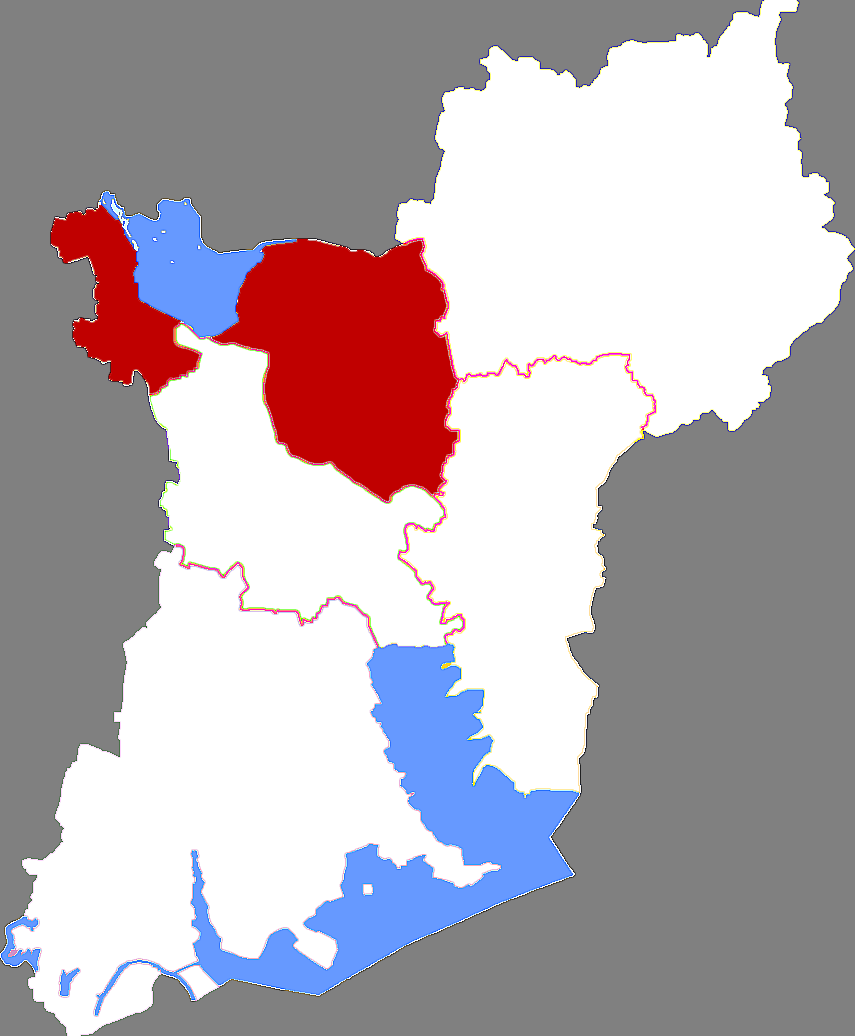

- Location in Jiangsu
- Coordinates: 33°55′53″N 118°21′31″E
- Country: People's Republic of China
- Province: Jiangsu
- Prefecture-level city: Suqian

Area
  - Total: 672.26 km^{2} (259.56 sq mi)

Population (2020 census)
  - Total: 588,520
  - Density: 875.44/km^{2} (2,267.4/sq mi)
- Time zone: UTC+8 (China Standard)
- Postal code: 223800

Suyu District (simplified Chinese: 宿豫区; traditional Chinese: 宿豫區; pinyin: Sùyù Qū) is one of two districts of Suqian, Jiangsu province, China.

== Administrative divisions ==
At present, Suyu District has 14 towns and 3 townships.

14 towns

- Shunhe (顺河镇)
- Xiaodian (晓店镇)
- Caiji (蔡集镇)
- Dingzui (丁嘴镇)
- Zaohe (皂河镇)
- Yanghua (仰化镇)
- Daxing (大兴镇)
- Wangguanji (王官集镇)
- Lailong (来龙镇)
- Huangdun (黄墩镇)
- Luji (陆集镇)
- Guanmiao (关庙镇)
- Shiling (侍岭镇)
- Xinzhuang (新庄镇)

3 townships

- Jingtou (井头乡)
- Caoji (曹集乡)
- Bao'an (保安乡)
