= Sanjiang University =

University in Nanjing, China

- 三江学院
- Affiliation: National People's Congress of China
- President: Professor Chen Wannian
- Academic staff: 550
- Students: 18,000
- Location: Nanjing, Jiangsu, China
- Language: Chinese language
- Website: sju.js.cn (Chinese language)

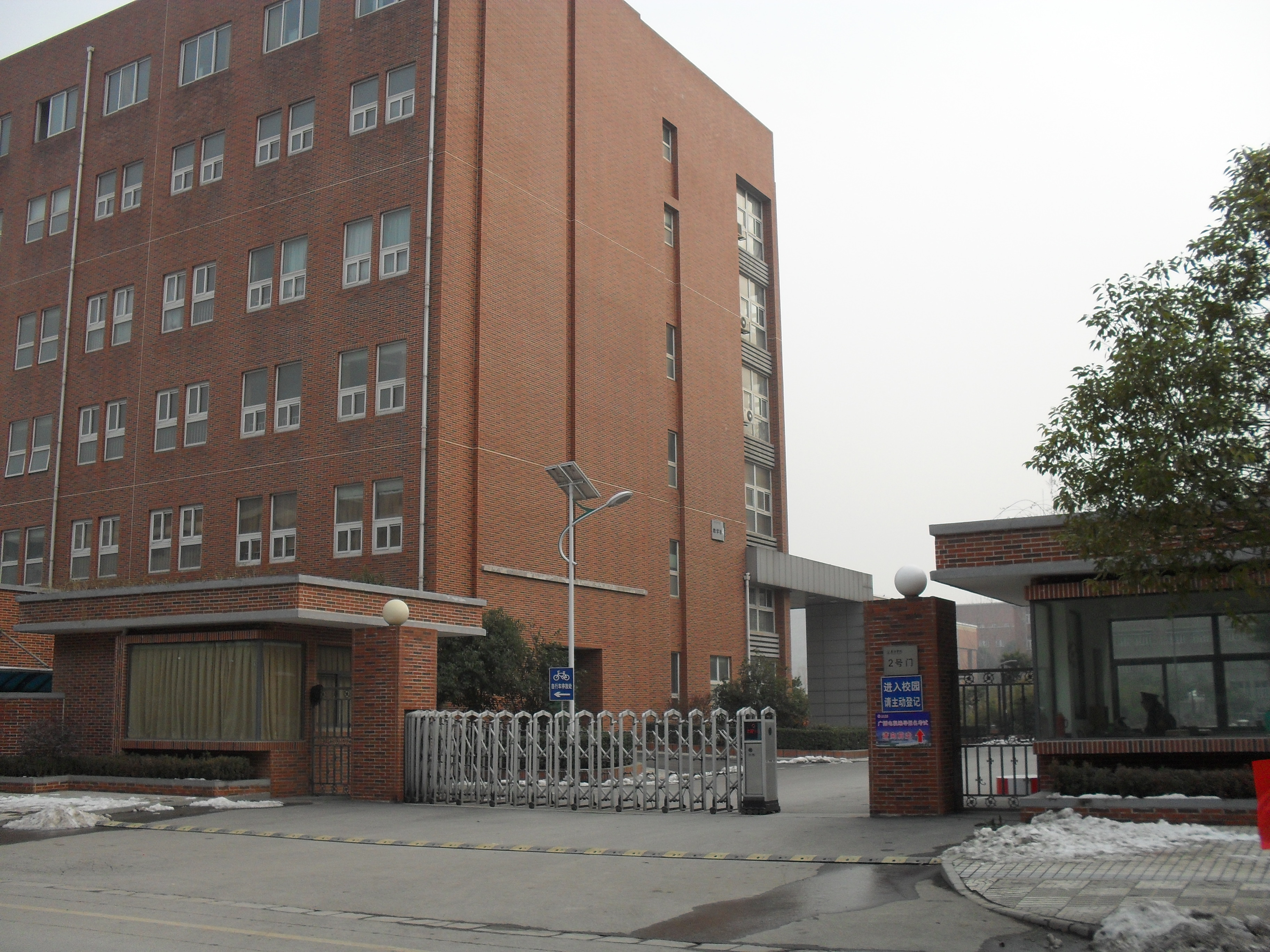
The north gate of Sanjiang University

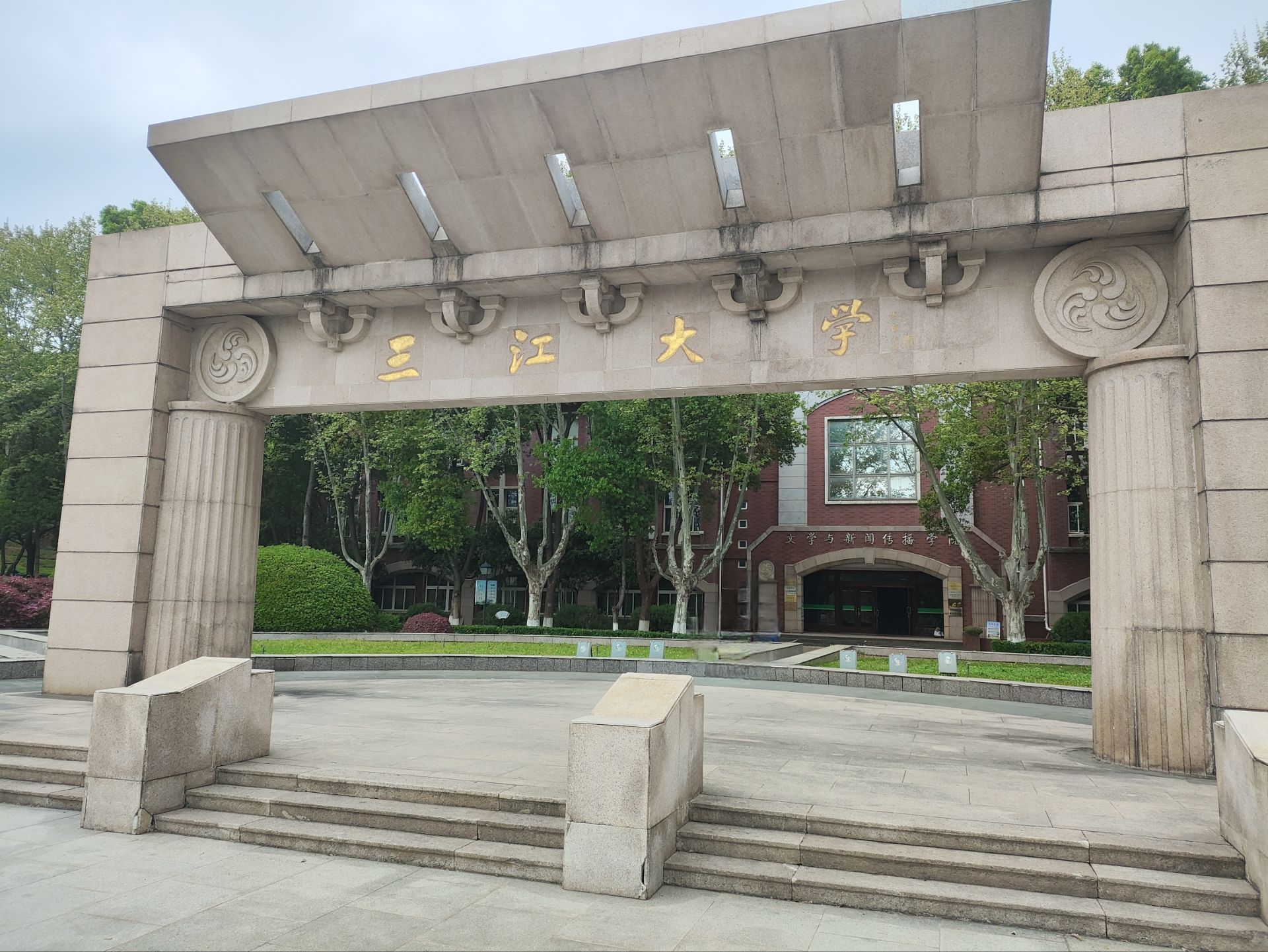
Gate No. 1 of Tiexinqiao Campus of Sanjiang University still retains the words "三江大学"

Sanjiang University (Chinese: 三江学院) is a university in the countryside of Nanjing city, which is the capital of China's Jiangsu Province.

== History ==
The name of Sanjiang College is taken from Sanjiang Normal School, which was founded in 1902. In 1992, Tao Yongde and Ding Chengjing, with other retired professors of Nanjing University and Southeast University, initiated the establishment of "Sanjiang College". The college was opened for enrollment in June 1993, and a new campus was established in 1999, which is located in Tiexinqiao, Yuhuatai District, Nanjing, China.

In February 2002, approved by the Ministry of Education, the university was upgraded to an undergraduate college and named "Sanjiang University".

== Campus ==
Sanjiang University is the first private institution of higher learning in the Jiangsu Province. The current president is Professor Chen Wannian, who is a member of the ninth National People's Congress of China.

The campus occupies an area of more than 300,000 square metres, and its buildings have 200,000 square metres of floor space.

The student body of this institution consists of around 18,000 students, including 1300 students in Continued Education School. Sanjiang University also recruits foreign students. Sanjiang University employs around 550 faculty members, of which, more than 380 are professors and associate professors.
