= Alexander Borisovich Mindlin =

Russian engineer and author (1929–2019)

Alexander Borisvich Mindlin
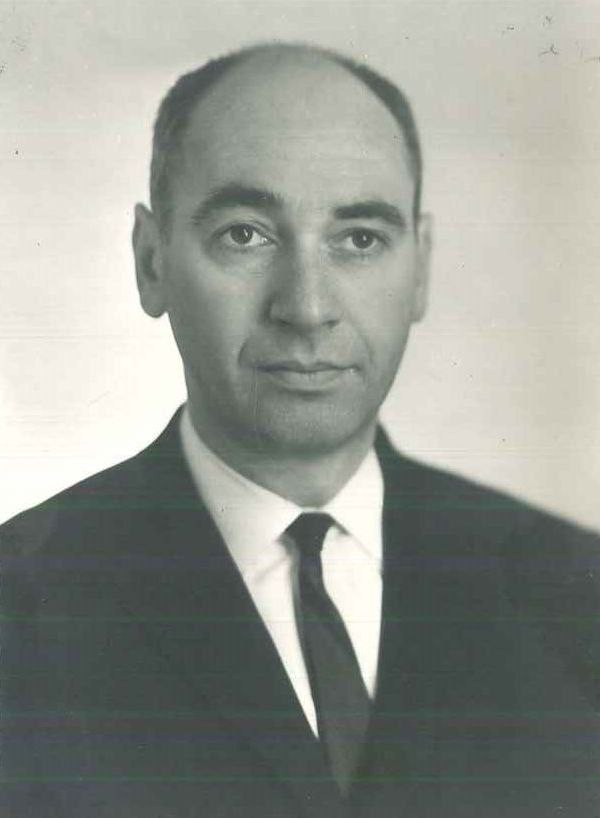
- Alexander Borisvich Mindlin
- Born: 14 May 1929; Leningrad, USSR
- Died: 11 October 2019 (aged 90); Moscow, Russia
- Education: Leningrad Electrotechnical Institute
- Occupation: Writer
- Writing career
- Period: 1996–2019
- Genre: Publicism
- Website: alexmindlin.ucoz.ru

Alexander Borisovich Mindlin (Russian: Александр Борисович Миндлин, 14 May 1929 – 11 October 2019) was a Russian engineer and author.

== Biography ==
Mindlin was born in 1929 in Leningrad. He survived the Siege of Leningrad, undertaken by the Nazi German Army. In 1951 he graduated from the Leningrad Electrotechnical Institute. For 44 years, he worked in various factories and scientific research institutes. He developed and manufactured electrical systems and products. He had published about thirty papers and three monographs on the specialty and received eight invention certificates. In 1968 he moved permanently from Leningrad to Moscow. In 1996, after retiring he became a full-time historian of Russian Jews (1762-1917). He had published 15 articles and two books on the subject, as well as an autobiographical book "My life in the USSR" (Russian: "Время совка").

== Books in Russian ==
- State, political and public figures of the Russian Empire in the fate of the Jews, 1762-1917: A Guide to persons / Alexander Mindlin .- St. Petersburg: Aletheia, 2007 - 391 p.; 21 cm. - (Leviathan: The State. Society. Personality). - Index . - Bibliography .: p. 360-381 .- ISBN 978-5-903354-85-6.
- My life in the USSR (Russian: "Время совка") / A.B. Mindlin .- Moscow, 2008 - 391 p. 20 cm.
- State Duma and the Jewish question / Alexander Mindlin. - St. Petersburg: Aletheia, 2014. - 487 p. : Ill.; 21 cm. - (History Book) .- Bibliography: p. 449-467. - Index: p. 468-485. - 1000 copies. - ISBN 978-5-90670-572-3

== Articles in Russian ==
Pyotr Stolypin "Jewish policy" // The Society "Jewish heritage". A series of preprints. Vol. 19. M. 1996.

The Jewish question and financial relations between Russia and the West in the late 19th - early 20th century // the Bulletin of the Jewish University in Moscow. 1996. No.2 (12). pp. 81–103.

The Russian public and the problem of Jewish equality in the early 20th century // The Society "Jewish heritage". A series of preprints. Vol. 29.- M. 1997.

A.A. Lopuhin, S.D. Urusov and anti-Semitism // The Society "Jewish heritage". A series of preprints. Vol. 30.- M. 1997.

The activities of committees, commissions and meetings on Jewish reforms in Russia in the 19th - early 20th century // "Questions of history". 2000. No. 8. pp. 43–61.

Russian Jews in the projects of "Joint nobility" // "Issues of history". 2002. No.4. pp. 13–26.
