= Gabriel B. Mindlin =

Gabriel B. Mindlin is a Professor of physics at the University of Buenos Aires and a scientist whose research focuses on the physical mechanisms underlying the production of songs by songbirds.

His research has produced mathematical and computer models which realistically reproduces songs of several species. He has published four books and over 150 original research papers in peer-reviewed journals and conference proceedings which have received over 5200 citations.

Mindlin graduated in physics from University of La Plata (Argentina, 1987) and received a PhD from Drexel University (1991). He was Senior Fellow of Santa Fe Institute (2002–2004) and received an Arthur Taylor Winfree award from the International Center for Theoretical Physics (Trieste, 2004). In addition, he was elected a Fellow of the American Association for the Advancement of Science (2010).

In 2023 he was granted the Konex Award Merit Diploma for his work in Information Sciences and Artificial Intelligence in the last decade. He works as a Full Professor in the Department of Physics of the Faculty of Exact and Natural Sciences of Buenos Aires University, and is a Senior Researcher at the National Scientific and Technical Research Council (CONICET).

== Selected publications ==
- Mindlin, G. B.; Laje, R. (2005). The Physics of Birdsong. Springer. ISBN 978-3-540-25399-0.
- Mindlin, G. B.; Gardner, T. J.; Goller, F.; Suthers, R. (2003). "Experimental support for a model for birdsong production". Physical Review E. 68 (4) 041908. Bibcode:2003PhRvE..68d1908M. doi:10.1103/PhysRevE.68.041908. hdl:20.500.12110/paper_1063651X_v68_n41_p419081_Mindlin. PMID 14682974.
- Laje, R.; Mindlin, G. B. (2002). "Diversity within a birdsong". Physical Review Letters. 89 (28) 288102. Bibcode:2002PhRvL..89B8102L. doi:10.1103/PhysRevLett.89.288102. PMID 12513182.
- Gardner, T.; Cecchi, G.; Magnasco, M.; Laje, R.; Mindlin, G. B. (2001). "Simple motor gestures for birdsongs". Physical Review Letters. 87 (20) 208101. Bibcode:2001PhRvL..87t8101G. doi:10.1103/PhysRevLett.87.208101. PMID 11690514.
- Solari, H. G.; Natiello, M. A.; Mindlin, G. B. (1996). Nonlinear Dynamics: A Two-Way Trip from Physics to Math. CRC Press. ISBN 978-0-7503-0380-4.
- Mindlin, G. B.; Hou, X. J.; Solari, H. G.; Gilmore, R.; Tufillaro, N. B. (1990). "Classification of strange attractors by integers". Physical Review Letters. 64 (20): 2350–2353. Bibcode:1990PhRvL..64.2350M. doi:10.1103/PhysRevLett.64.2350. PMID 10041690.
