= Jinling College, Nanjing University =

College of Nanjing University in Nanjing, China

- 南京大学金陵学院
- Type: National university
- Established: 1998
- Parent institution: Nanjing University
- President: 王殿祥
- Vice-president: 钱国兴、赵清、邵进
- Undergraduates: 11,000
- Location: Nanjing, Jiangsu, China
- Website: (in Chinese)

Jinling College, Nanjing University (Chinese: 南京大学金陵学院) is a college of Nanjing University in Nanjing, China. It is a young institution in Nanjing University, founded in 1998 by Nanjing University and located on its Pukou Campus. It was originally set for the cultivating first-class inter-disciplinary talents who have innovation spirits and are capable of solving problems in industry. By adopting new educational scheme as an exploration to education, this college is growing up to a prestigious institution.

Since 2022, Jinling College has been restructured as part of the Suzhou Campus of Nanjing University, with a focus on education for digital industries.
