= Xuzhou Medical University =

University in Xuzhou, China

- 徐州医科大学
- Motto: 以德载医，博学创新
- Motto in English: To practice medicine with morality, to study extensively and innovate actively
- Type: Public
- Established: 1958
- President: Wu Yongping
- Students: 13,000+
- Location: Xuzhou, Jiangsu, China
- Campus: Urban area
- Website: www.xzhmu.edu.cn/

Xuzhou Medical University (simplified Chinese: 徐州医科大学; traditional Chinese: 徐州醫科大學; pinyin: Xúzhōu Yīkē Dàxué) is a provincial medical university located in Xuzhou, Jiangsu Province, China.

== History ==
The university was established in 1958 as Xuzhou branch, Nanjing Medical College initially. In 1959, Xinhailian Medical Academy was merged into the branch, which was independent and renamed Xuzhou Medical College in the next year. In 2000, Xuzhou Health Vocational School was merged into the college. With the approval of Ministry of Education, the college was formally renamed Xuzhou Medical University in 2016.

== Academics ==
The university has a good reputation for its anesthesiology education as one of the medical colleges to establish independent department of anesthesiology first in 1987.
