= Suzhou University of Science and Technology =

Public university in Suzhou, Jiangsu, China

Coordinates: 31.3059°N 120.5648°E

- 苏州科技大学
- Type: Public
- Established: 1932, refounded in 2001
- President: Jiang Pengming
- Location: Suzhou New District, Jiangsu, China
- Campus: Shihu, Jiangfeng and Tianping
- Website: www.usts.edu.cn

The Suzhou University of Science and Technology (SUST; Chinese: 苏州科技大学; pinyin: Sūzhōu Kējì Dàxué) is a provincial public university in Suzhou, Jiangsu, China.

SUST was established on 1 September 2001 by merging the former Suzhou Institute of Urban Construction and Environmental Protection and the former Suzhou Railway Teachers' College, which is a full-time general university mainly in engineering, with coordinated development of engineering, science, literature, administration and arts. There are three campuses: Shihu, Jiangfeng and Tianping.

In 2023, the university landed in hot water when it released admission confirmation notice to students in midnight (4:00 am) and gave the applicants only 30 minutes to confirm their admission.
