= Suqian =

Suqian 宿迁市 Sutsien, Su-ch'ien
- Prefecture-level city
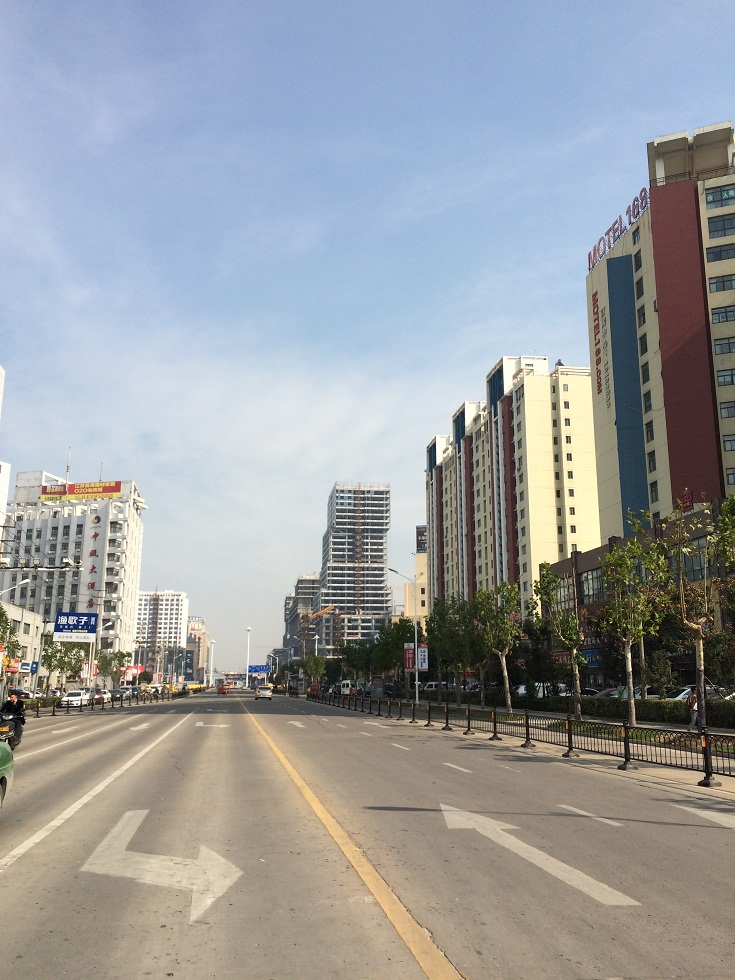

- Location of Suqian City (red) in Jiangsu

- Location of the city center in Jiangsu Suqian (Eastern China) Suqian (China)
- Coordinates (Suqian municipal government): 33°57′47″N 118°16′30″E
- Country: People's Republic of China
- Province: Jiangsu
- Municipal seat: Sucheng District

Government
  - Mayor: Wang Tianqi (王天琦)

Area
  - Prefecture-level city: 8,555 km^{2} (3,303 sq mi)
  - Urban: 2,108 km^{2} (814 sq mi)
  - Metro: 2,108 km^{2} (814 sq mi)

Population (2020 census)
  - Prefecture-level city: 4,986,192
  - Density: 582.8/km^{2} (1,510/sq mi)
  - Urban: 1,622,912
  - Urban density: 769.9/km^{2} (1,994/sq mi)
  - Metro: 1,622,912
  - Metro density: 769.9/km^{2} (1,994/sq mi)

GDP
  - Prefecture-level city: CN¥ 371.9 billion US$ 57.6 billion
  - Per capita: CN¥ 74,586; US$ 11,561
- Time zone: UTC+8 (China Standard)
- Postal code: 223800 (Urban center); 223600, 223700, 223900 (Other areas)
- Area code: 527
- ISO 3166 code: CN-JS-13
- Major Nationalities: Han
- County-level divisions: 5
- Township-level divisions: 115
- License Plate Prefix: 苏N
- Website: www.suqian.gov.cn

Suqian (simplified Chinese: 宿迁; traditional Chinese: 宿遷; pinyin: Sùqiān, IPA: [sû.tɕʰjɛ́n]) is a prefecture-level city in northern Jiangsu Province, China. It borders Xuzhou to the northwest, Lianyungang to the northeast, Huai'an to the south, and the province of Anhui to the west.

== History ==
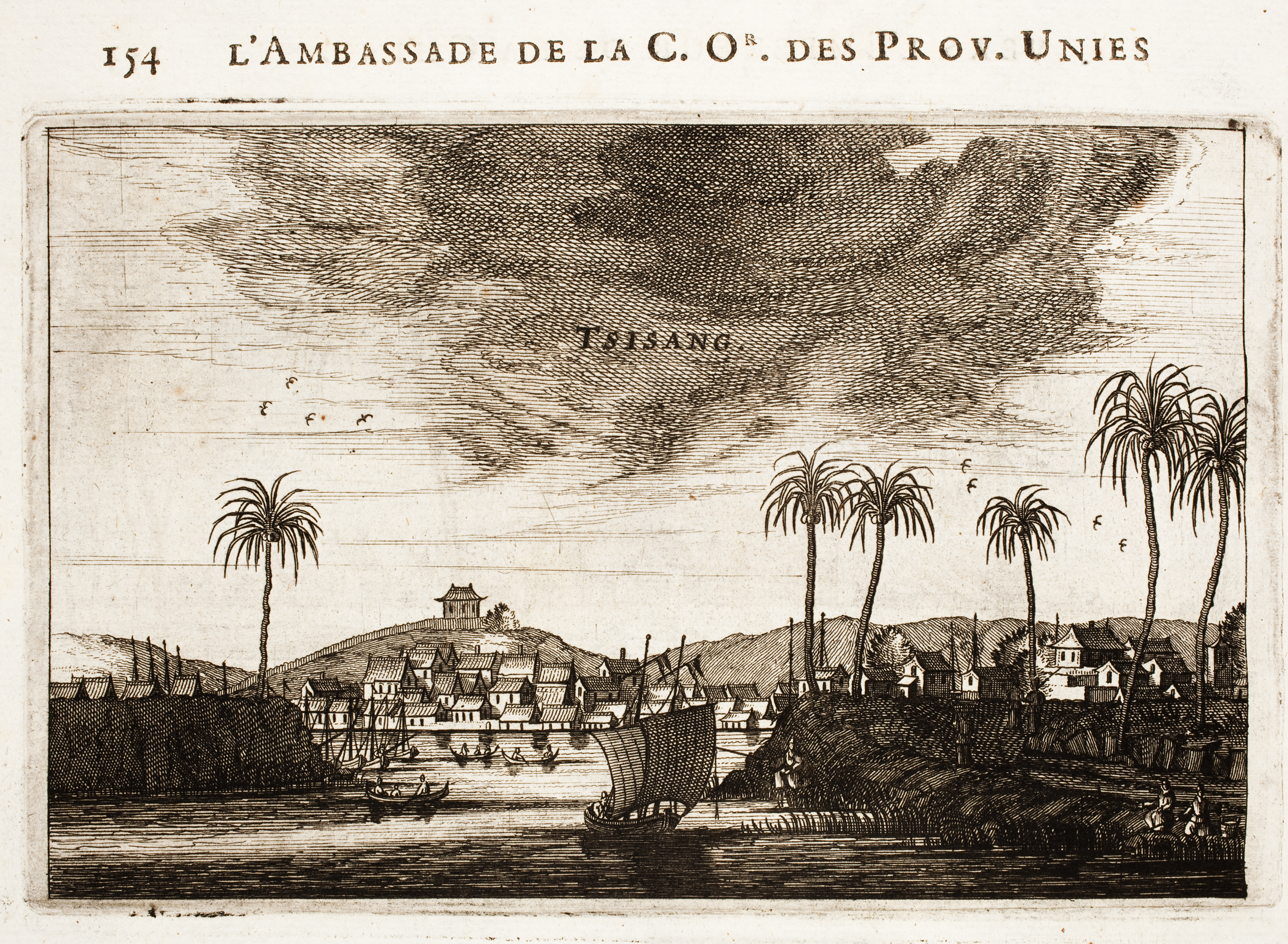
"Tsisang" (Suqian). Nieuhof: L'ambassade de la Compagnie Orientale des Provinces Unies vers l'Empereur de la Chine, 1665

Suqian was said to be the site of a military grain store built when the Emperor Yuan of Jin reigned. Thus, the former Xiaxiang county where the store located was renamed Suyu (宿預; means "prepared" or "usually prepared") in 405. Then the county was annexed by Xuzhou and renamed Suqian in 762 because the homophone "yu (豫)" as the given name of the Emperor Daizong of Tang was deemed to be ineffable. The county was put under the jurisdiction of Huaiyang military prefecture during the Song dynasty, then was transferred to Pizhou after Jurchen's Jin took it. The county was administered by Huai'an military prefecture during 1272–75, but restored as a part of Pizhou afterwards. It was annexed by Xuzhou again in 1733.

The area was rife with banditry during the early years of the Republic of China. In Autumn 1917, six persons were executed as bandits in Suqian. "They cut off their arms, broke their legs, cut off their ears, punched out their eyes, skinned them, then cut off their heads, and finally cut out their hearts." Suqian was put under the jurisdiction of Huaiyin in 1934. The county was converted as a county-level city in 1987, later was elevated to prefecture status in 1996.

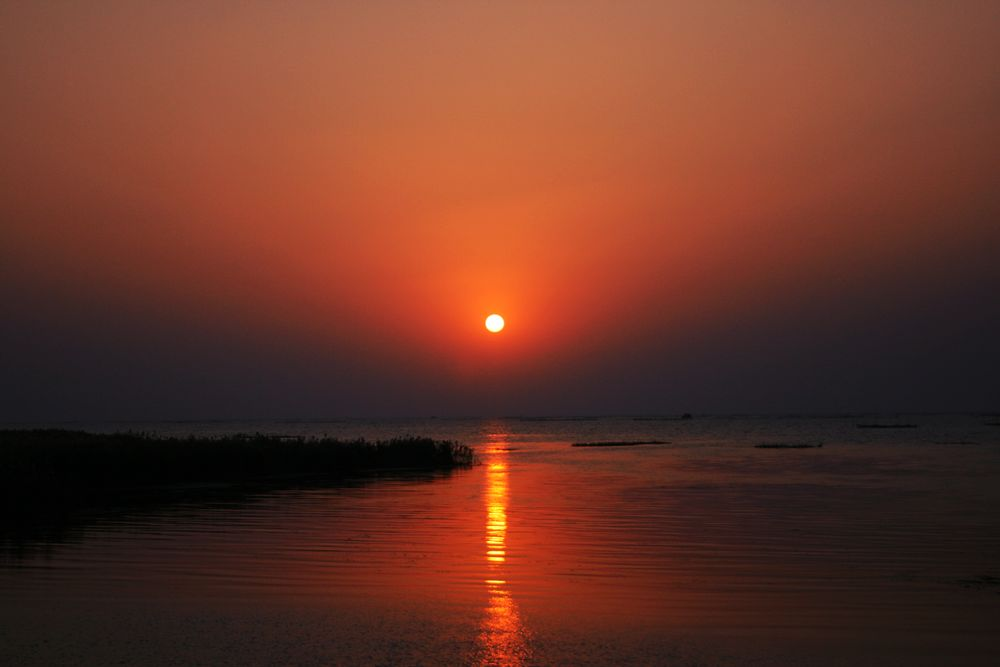
Luoma Lake

== Geography and climate ==
Suqian possesses the majority of Luoma Lake, which is a major lake in the Huai River basin. The city is also home to the coldest temperature on record for Jiangsu at −23.4 °C (−10.1 °F) on February 5, 1969.

Climate data for Suqian (Suyu District), elevation 25 m (82 ft), (1991–2020 normals, extremes 1969–present)
Month	Jan	Feb	Mar	Apr	May	Jun	Jul	Aug	Sep	Oct	Nov	Dec	Year
Record high °C (°F)	17.3 (63.1)	26.1 (79.0)	32.6 (90.7)	32.8 (91.0)	36.6 (97.9)	38.5 (101.3)	38.5 (101.3)	37.5 (99.5)	35.2 (95.4)	33.1 (91.6)	27.8 (82.0)	20.4 (68.7)	38.5 (101.3)
Mean daily maximum °C (°F)	5.4 (41.7)	8.6 (47.5)	14.1 (57.4)	20.6 (69.1)	25.7 (78.3)	29.5 (85.1)	31.1 (88.0)	30.4 (86.7)	26.7 (80.1)	21.6 (70.9)	14.5 (58.1)	7.7 (45.9)	19.7 (67.4)
Daily mean °C (°F)	1.1 (34.0)	3.9 (39.0)	9.0 (48.2)	15.3 (59.5)	20.6 (69.1)	24.8 (76.6)	27.3 (81.1)	26.5 (79.7)	22.2 (72.0)	16.5 (61.7)	9.6 (49.3)	3.2 (37.8)	15.0 (59.0)
Mean daily minimum °C (°F)	−2.4 (27.7)	0.1 (32.2)	4.6 (40.3)	10.3 (50.5)	15.8 (60.4)	20.6 (69.1)	24.1 (75.4)	23.4 (74.1)	18.5 (65.3)	12.2 (54.0)	5.6 (42.1)	−0.4 (31.3)	11.0 (51.9)
Record low °C (°F)	−15.6 (3.9)	−23.4 (−10.1)	−8.0 (17.6)	−0.7 (30.7)	3.4 (38.1)	11.6 (52.9)	17.1 (62.8)	14.2 (57.6)	8.0 (46.4)	−1.2 (29.8)	−7.1 (19.2)	−16.5 (2.3)	−23.4 (−10.1)
Average precipitation mm (inches)	22.7 (0.89)	26.5 (1.04)	41.9 (1.65)	46.9 (1.85)	76.4 (3.01)	127.9 (5.04)	211.1 (8.31)	180.1 (7.09)	91.3 (3.59)	41.8 (1.65)	35.2 (1.39)	20.2 (0.80)	922 (36.31)
Average precipitation days (≥ 0.1 mm)	4.8	5.9	6.4	7.2	7.5	8.3	12.9	11.4	7.5	5.5	5.9	4.9	88.2
Average snowy days	3.2	2.6	1.1	0.1	0	0	0	0	0	0	0.6	1.5	9.1
Average relative humidity (%)	68	66	64	65	69	72	82	83	79	72	71	68	72
Mean monthly sunshine hours	143.5	143.7	181.4	200.7	211.5	182.1	175.4	180.5	172.9	177.1	153.3	151.1	2,073.2
Percentage possible sunshine	45	46	49	51	49	42	40	44	47	51	50	49	47
Source: China Meteorological Administration Weather China

== Demographics ==
As of the 2020 Chinese census, Suqian had a recorded population of about 4,986,192 whom 1,622,912 lived in the built-up (or metro) area made of Sucheng and Suyu urban districts.

== Economy ==
Local Yanghe along with Maotai and Wuliangye, are the three biggest manufacturers of baijiu. Besides, several domestic companies followed JD.com to site their call centres in Suqian.

== Transport ==
=== Roads ===
==== Expressways ====
- G2513 Huai'an–Xuzhou Expressway

=== Rail ===
Suqian station on the Xuzhou–Yancheng high-speed railway is located in the southern outskirt of Suqian. Another station, Suqian East, is to be built on the Weifang–Suqian high-speed railway, now under construction as part of the second channel of the Beijing–Shanghai high-speed railway.

== Education ==
Suqian College is the single institution in Suqian providing bachelor's degree education.

== Administration ==
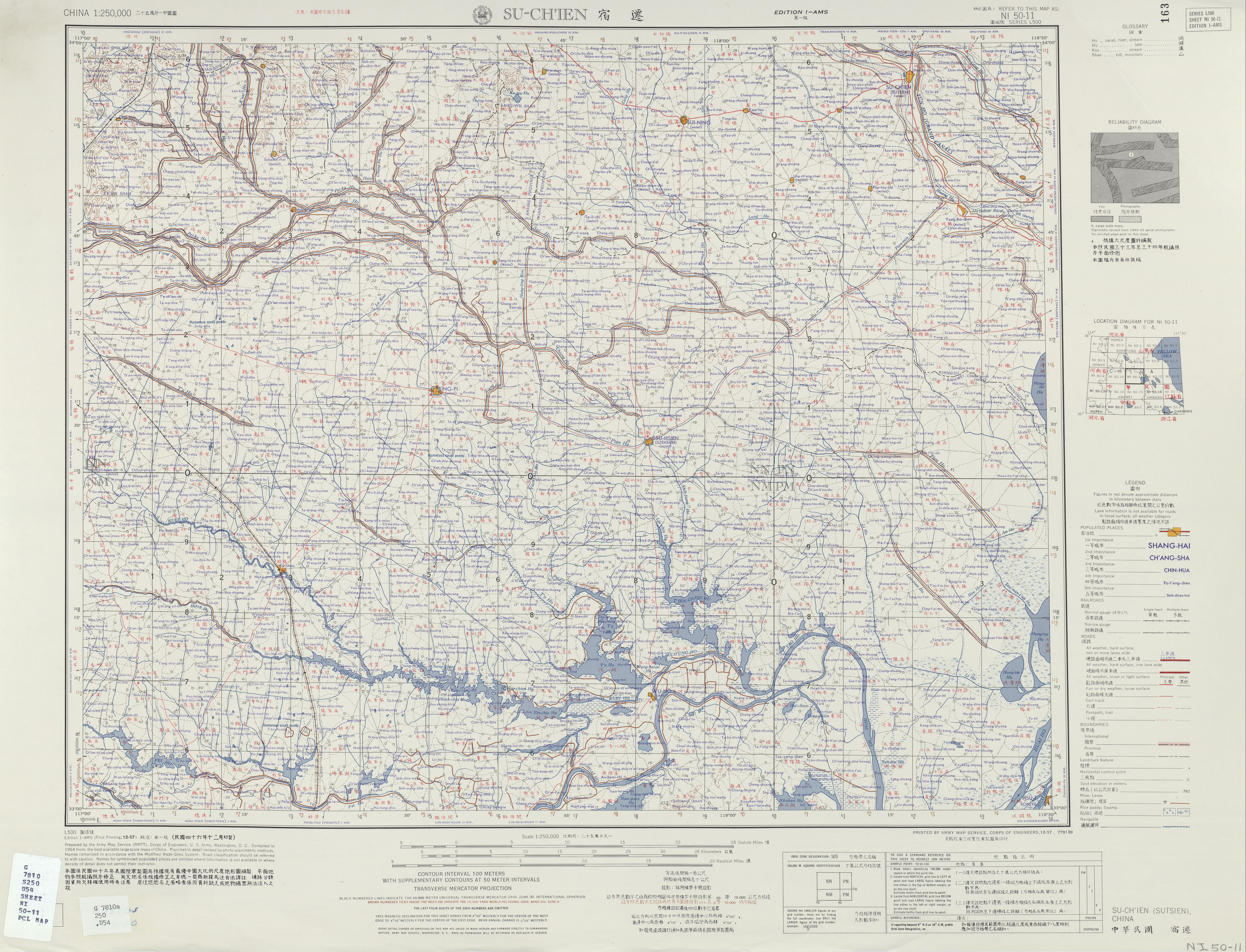
Map including Suqian (labeled as SU-CH'IEN (SUTSIEN) (walled) 宿遷) (AMS, 1954)

The prefecture-level city of Suqian administers 5 county-level divisions, including 3 counties and 2 districts.

These are further divided into 115 township-level divisions, including 111 towns and township, and 4 subdistricts.

Map
Subdivision	Simplified Chinese	Hanyu Pinyin	Population (2020)	Area (km^{2})	Density (/km^{2})
City Proper
Sucheng District	宿城区	Sùchéng Qū	1,034,392	1,018	1,016
Suburban
Suyu District	宿豫区	Sùyù Qū	588,520	1,146	513.5
Rural
Shuyang County	沭阳县	Shùyáng Xiàn	1,674,978	2,300	728.3
Siyang County	泗阳县	Sìyáng Xiàn	829,562	1,389	597.2
Sihong County	泗洪县	Sìhóng Xiàn	858,740	2,719	315.8
Total			4,986,192	8,572	581.7
