= Jiangsu University =

Provincial public university in Zhenjiang, Jiangsu, China

- 江苏大学
- Former names: Jiangsu University of Science and Technology; Zhenjiang Medical College; Zhenjiang Teachers’ College
- Motto: 博学 求是 明德
- Motto in English: Be erudite, practical and virtuous
- Type: Public university
- Established: 2001
- President: Yuan Shouqi
- Faculty: 1,950
- Administrative staff: 4,500
- Students: 34,100
- Undergraduates: 29,200
- Postgraduates: 4,300 Masters, 600 PhD
- Location: Zhenjiang, Jiangsu, China
- Campus: Urban area
- Colours
- Website: eng.ujs.edu.cn

Jiangsu University (Chinese: 江苏大学; pinyin: Jiāngsū Dàxué) is a provincial public university in Zhenjiang, Jiangsu, China. It is affiliated with the Jiangsu Provincial Government, and co-sponsored by the Ministry of Education and the Ministry of Agriculture and Rural Affairs.

In August 2001, Jiangsu Technology University (江苏理工大学), Zhenjiang Medical College (镇江医学院), and Zhenjiang Teachers Vocational School (镇江师范专科学校) merged to form Jiangsu University.

== History and overview ==
Jiangsu University was established through the combination of Jiangsu University of Science and Technology, Zhenjiang Medical College and Zhenjiang Teachers' College, under the permission of the Chinese Ministry of Education in August, 2001.

Its main institution was the former Jiangsu University of Science and Technology, which was one of the 88 key universities designated by the State Council in 1978. Its history began with Sanjiang Normal School founded in 1902, which evolved and renamed Liangjiang Normal School in 1906, Nanjing Higher Normal School in 1915, National Southeastern University in 1921, Disi Zhongshan University in 1927, Jiangsu University in February and Central University in March 1928, and Nanjing University in 1949. Nanjing University Engineering College became Nanjing Polytechnic Institute in 1952 and then in 1960 a part of it became independent and moved to Zhenjiang next year and later became Jiangsu University of Science and Technology. It renamed Jiangsu University when merged with two colleges in the same city in 2001.

Jiangsu University (JSU) was founded in 1902 as a part of Sanjiang Normal University. It was retitled as Jiangsu University by integrating Jiangsu University of Science and Technology, Zhenjiang Medical College and Zhenjiang Teachers' College with the approval of the Ministry of Education of China in August, 2001.

JSU offers 88 undergraduate programs, 170 master programs, and 42 PhD programs in 10 academic fields: Engineering, Science, Management, Economics, Medicine, Law, Education, Literature and History. The university has 13 post-doctoral research stations.

University rankings

Regional – Overall
- QS Asia: =218 (2025)

JSU has 5,763 staff members (including those of Affiliated Hospital). 2,475 are faculty members, including 450 professors. 54% of them have got Ph.D degrees and over 24% have experience of overseas study. The current total enrollment of full-time students amounts to over 33,000, including 10,000 postgraduates, 842 international students from 74 countries. Jingjiang College of Jiangsu University has an enrollment of about 10,000 full-time students.

== Administration ==
=== Schools and departments ===
The university is organized into the following schools and departments.

- School of Medicine
- School of Medical Technology
- School of Food and Biological Engineering
- School of Business Administration
- School of Mechanical Engineering
- School of Material Science and Engineering
- School of Finance and Economics
- School of Electrical and Information Engineering
- School of Environment
- School of Computer Science and Telecommunication Engineering
- School of Science
- School of Humanities and Social Sciences
- School of Foreign Languages
- School of Art
- School of Energy and Power Engineering
- School of Automotive and Traffic Engineering
- School of Chemistry and Chemical Engineering
- School of Pharmacy
- School of Law
- School of Teacher's Education
- Jingjiang College
