= China University of Mining and Technology =

Public university in Xuzhou, Jiangsu, China

Coordinates: 39°59′48″N 116°20′59″E

- 中国矿业大学
- Type: Public
- Established: 1909; 117 years ago
- President: Liu Bo
- Students: 35,000
- Undergraduates: 23,000 full-time
- Location: Xuzhou, China
- Website: cumt.edu.cn global.cumt.edu.cn

Chinese name
- Simplified Chinese: 中国矿业大学
- Traditional Chinese: 中國礦業大學
Transcriptions
Standard Mandarin
- Hanyu Pinyin: Zhōngguó Kuàngyè Dàxué

China University of Mining and Technology, Beijing
- 中国矿业大学-北京
- Motto: Innovation and Rigorous Pursuit
- Type: Public
- Established: 1909; 117 years ago
- President: Ge Shirong
- Location: Beijing, China
- Website: cumtb.edu.cn

Chinese name
- Simplified Chinese: 中国矿业大学-北京
- Traditional Chinese: 中國礦業大學-北京
Transcriptions
Standard Mandarin
- Hanyu Pinyin: Zhōngguó Kuàngyè Dàxué Běijīng

The China University of Mining and Technology (CUMT; 中国矿业大学) is a public university located in Xuzhou, Jiangsu, China. It is affiliated with the Ministry of Education, and co-sponsored with the Jiangsu Provincial People's Government and the Ministry of Emergency Management. The university is part of Project 211 and the Double First-Class Construction.

China University of Mining and Technology has two individual entities: the main entity is located in Xuzhou, Jiangsu province, which is called the China University of Mining and Technology (CUMT), and a second entity is located in Beijing, known as the China University of Mining and Technology, Beijing. The latter used to be the Graduate School of CUMT. CUMT is a leading multi-disciplinary polytechnic university with mining features.

== History ==
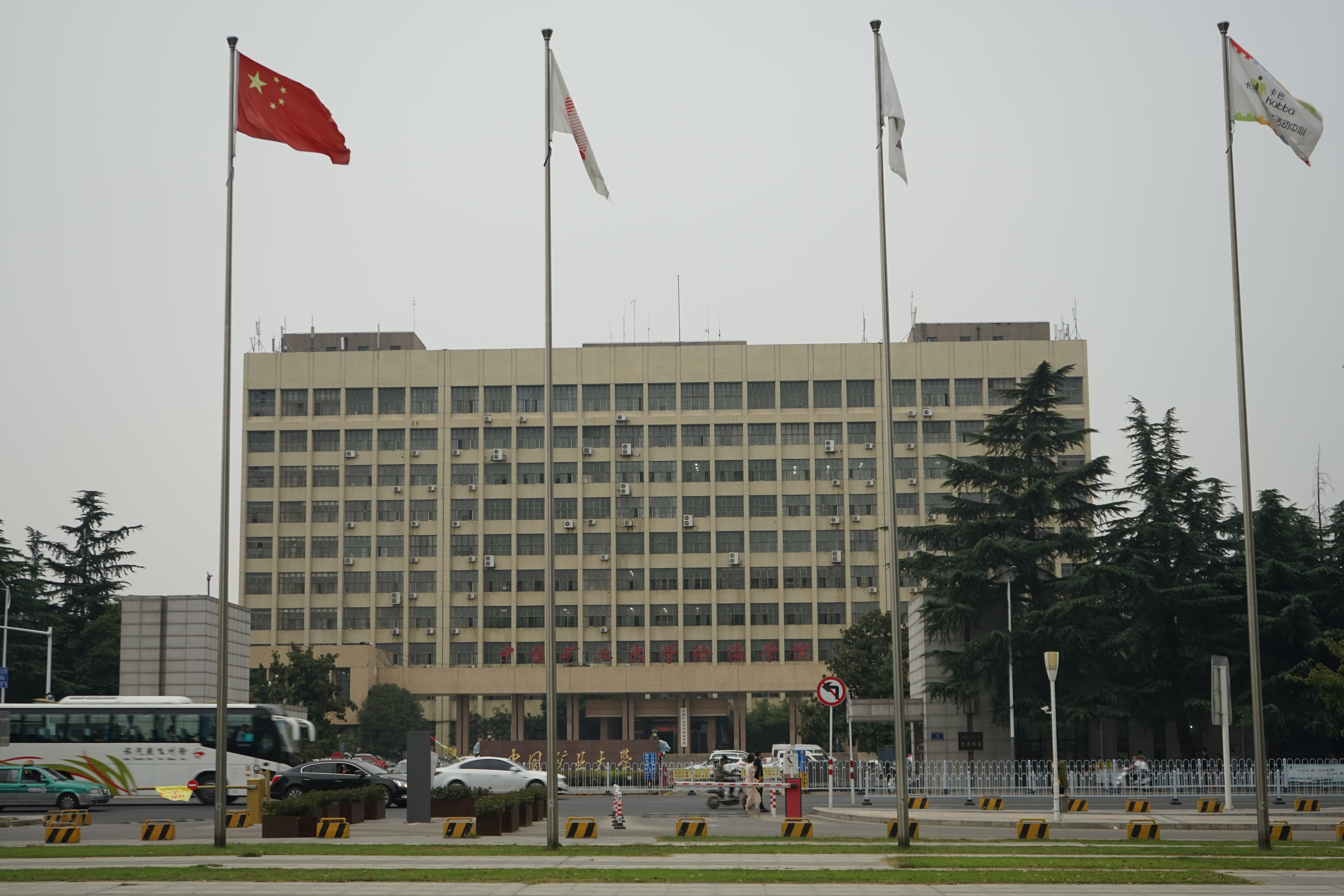
North gate of the Wenchang campus, China University of Mining and Technology, Xuzhou

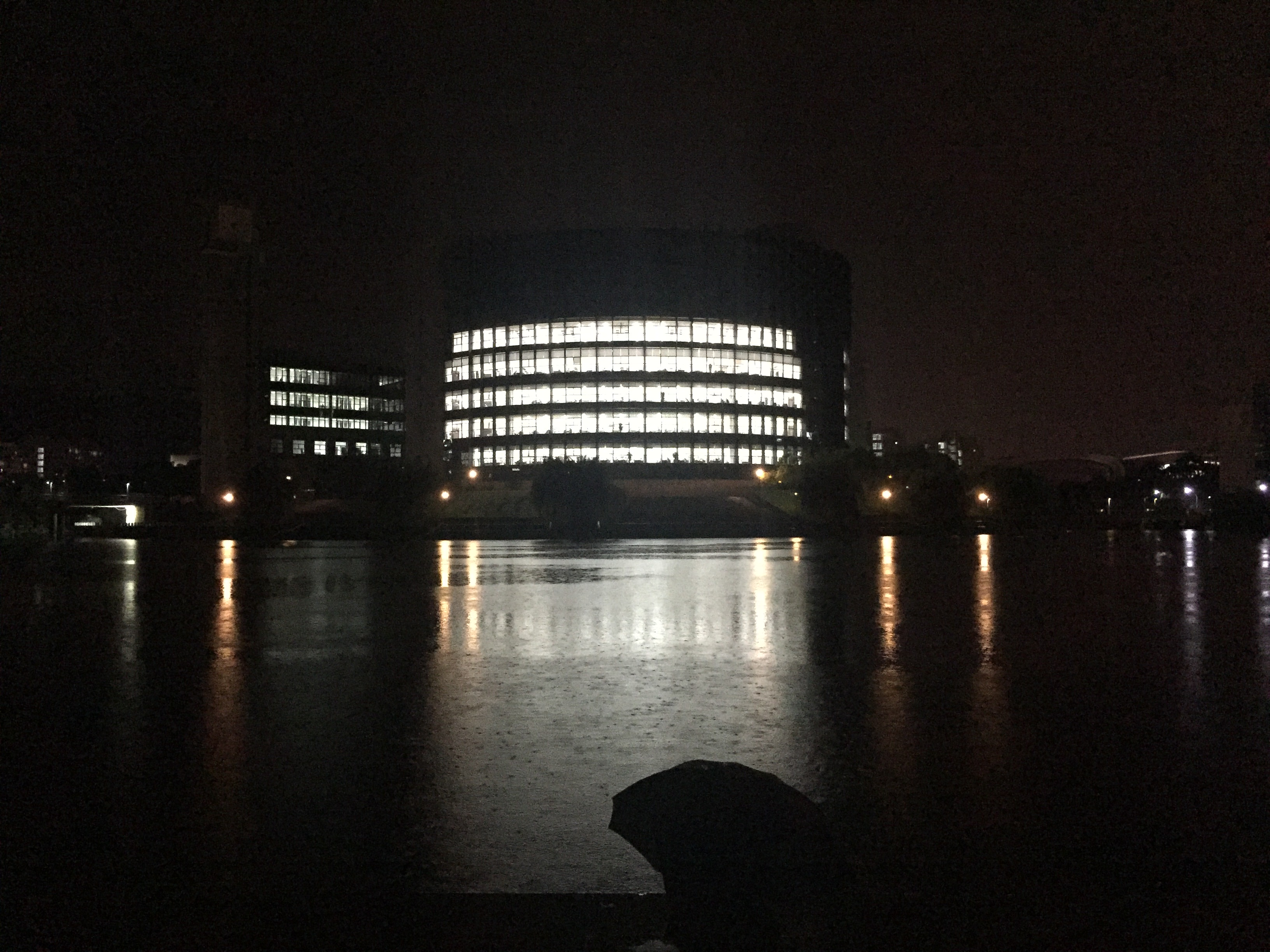
Library of the Nanhu campus, China University of Mining Technology, Xuzhou

The Jiaozuo School of Railroad and Mines, the predecessor of the university, was established in 1909. After moving from Jiaozuo to Tianjin in 1950, the school changed its name to the China Institute of Mining and Technology (CIMT). In 1952, during the nationwide restructuring of universities and colleges, the mining engineering departments of Tsinghua University, former Beiyang University and the Tangshan Institute of Railroad were merged into CIMT. In 1953, CIMT was moved to Beijing and became the Beijing Institute of Mining and Technology; in 1970, the institute was moved to Sichuan province and renamed the Sichuan Institute of Mining and Technology. In 1978, the institute was moved to the present new location in Xuzhou, Jiangsu province and restored its original name, CIMT. In the same year, the Beijing Graduate School of CIMT was founded and began to admit graduate students. In 1988, the institute was renamed the China University of Mining and Technology (CUMT). In 1997, the CUMT Beijing branch was founded based on the Beijing Graduate School of CUMT and began to admit undergraduate students. CUMT was approved as one of key universities in China by the government in 1960 and in 1978 respectively. In February 2000, CUMT was transferred to be under the administration of China's Ministry of Education from the administration of China's Ministry of Coal Mining and became one of the state universities directly supervised by the Ministry of Education.

In 2003, CUMT was approved to be separated into the China University of Mining and Technology (CUMT) and the China University of Mining and Technology, Beijing (CUMTB).

University rankings

Global – Overall
- QS World: =654 (2026)

Regional – Overall
- QS Asia: =261 (2025)

Jiaozuo School of Railroad and Mines (1909); Jiaozuo
China Institute of Mining and Technology (1950); Tianjin
Tsinghua University Mining Dept.
China Institute of Mining and Technology; 1952; Tianjin	Beiyang University
Tangshan Institute of Railroad
Beijing Institute of Mining and Technology (1953); Beijing
Sichuan Institute of Mining and Technology (1970); Sichuan
China Institute of Mining and Technology (1978); Xuzhou, Jiangsu
China University of Mining and Technology (1988); Xuzhou, Jiangsu
