= Jiangsu Ocean University =

University in Lianyungang, China

- 江苏海洋大学
- Type: Public
- Established: 1985
- President: Shi Jinfei (史金飞)
- Undergraduates: 20,000 (2016)
- Postgraduates: 200
- Location: Lianyungang, Jiangsu, China; 34.6075°N 119.22°E
- Website: www.hhit.edu.cn
- Location in Jiangsu Jiangsu Ocean University (China)

Jiangsu Ocean University, also known as Huaihai Institute of Technology (abbreviated HHIT; simplified Chinese: 淮海工学院; traditional Chinese: 淮海工學院; pinyin: Huáihǎi Gōngxuéyuàn), is an institute in Lianyungang, Jiangsu, China.

== History ==
In 1985, Huaihai University (Being Organizing) (淮海大学（筹）) was established as an element of the Provincial Seventh Five-year plan. The organizing was hosted by Jiangsu Provincial Government, Nanjing University, Southeast University, Soochow University and Nanjing Normal University. totally twelve universities and colleges offered aid. The institute transformed into Huaihai Institute of Technology in 1990 without national sanction.

The institute successively incorporated Jiangsu Salt Industry School (江苏盐业学校), Lianyungang Fisheries School (连云港水产学校) and Lianyungang Chemical Industry Academy (连云港化工高等专科学校) in May 1998, January 2000 and August 2002, respectively.

The institute was permit to grant bachelor's degree since 1993.

On 12 June 2019, Huaihai Institute of Technology officially changed its name to Jiangsu Ocean University.
