= Nanjing University of Finance and Economics =

Public university in Nanjing, Jiangsu, China

Coordinates: 32°05′16.92″N 118°45′16.46″E

Nanjing University of Finance & Economics
- 南京财经大学
- Former names: Nanjing Institute of Food Sciences; Nanjing Institute of Food Sciences and Economics; Nanjing School of Economics
- Motto: 自谦 自信 务实 超越
- Motto in English: Modesty, Confidence, Pragmatism, Transcendence
- Type: Public university
- Established: 1956
- President: Xu Congcai
- Faculty: 1,045
- Administrative staff: 1,686
- Location: Nanjing, Jiangsu, China
- Campus: 200 hectares; Urban
- Website: nufe.edu.cn

The Nanjing University of Finance and Economics (NUFE; simplified Chinese: 南京财经大学; traditional Chinese: 南京財經大學; pinyin: Nánjīng Cáijīng Dàxué) is a public university located in Nanjing, Jiangsu, China.

The Nanjing University of Finance & Economics is a regional powerhouse of economic and business studies. Specialising in various fields of economics, it is one of the very few institutions in mainland China whose faculty is able to publish in the economics journals (no more than 9 institutions; 10 top-five papers published in 2024 at all). Its research strengths lie in environmental economics, international economics, and other mainstream and heterodox economics sub-fields. NUFE offers a wide range of degree programmes in law, liberal arts, fine arts, science, and engineering. According to the Shanghai Ranking, NUFE ranks top 10th in the fields of economics in China.

== History ==
The University started out as a food sciences-specialised college, affiliated to China's Central Ministry of Grain, whose academic development has extensively learned from the development histories of institutions such as the University of Massachusetts Amherst, Wageningen University, and Universidade Estadual de Campinas. It was once renamed Nanjing Institute of Food Sciences and Economics (南京粮食经济学院), dedicated to training technocrats in food science, economics, and engineering. On 6 May 1993, the University was then reorganised as the Nanjing University of Economics (or the Nanjing School of Economics, Chinese: 南京经济学院). Since 2003, the University has become the current Nanjing University of Finance and Economics.

Nanjing Institute of Food Sciences; PRC Central Ministry of Grain (1956)
Nanjing Cadre School of Food Sciences; PRC Central Ministry of Grain (1957)
Nanjing Institute of Food Sciences; PRC Central Ministry of Grain (1959)
Jiangsu School of Food Sciences (1973)
Nanjing Institute of Food Sciences (1979)
Nanjing Institute of Food Sciences and Economics (1981)
Nanjing School of Economics (1993)	Nanjing Materials College (1964)
Jiangsu Cadre College of Economics and Management (1985)	Jiangsu Finance and Economic College (1991)	Jiangsu Accounting College (1985)
Nanjing University of Finance and Economics (2000)
Nanjing University of Finance & Economics (2003)–present

== Campuses ==
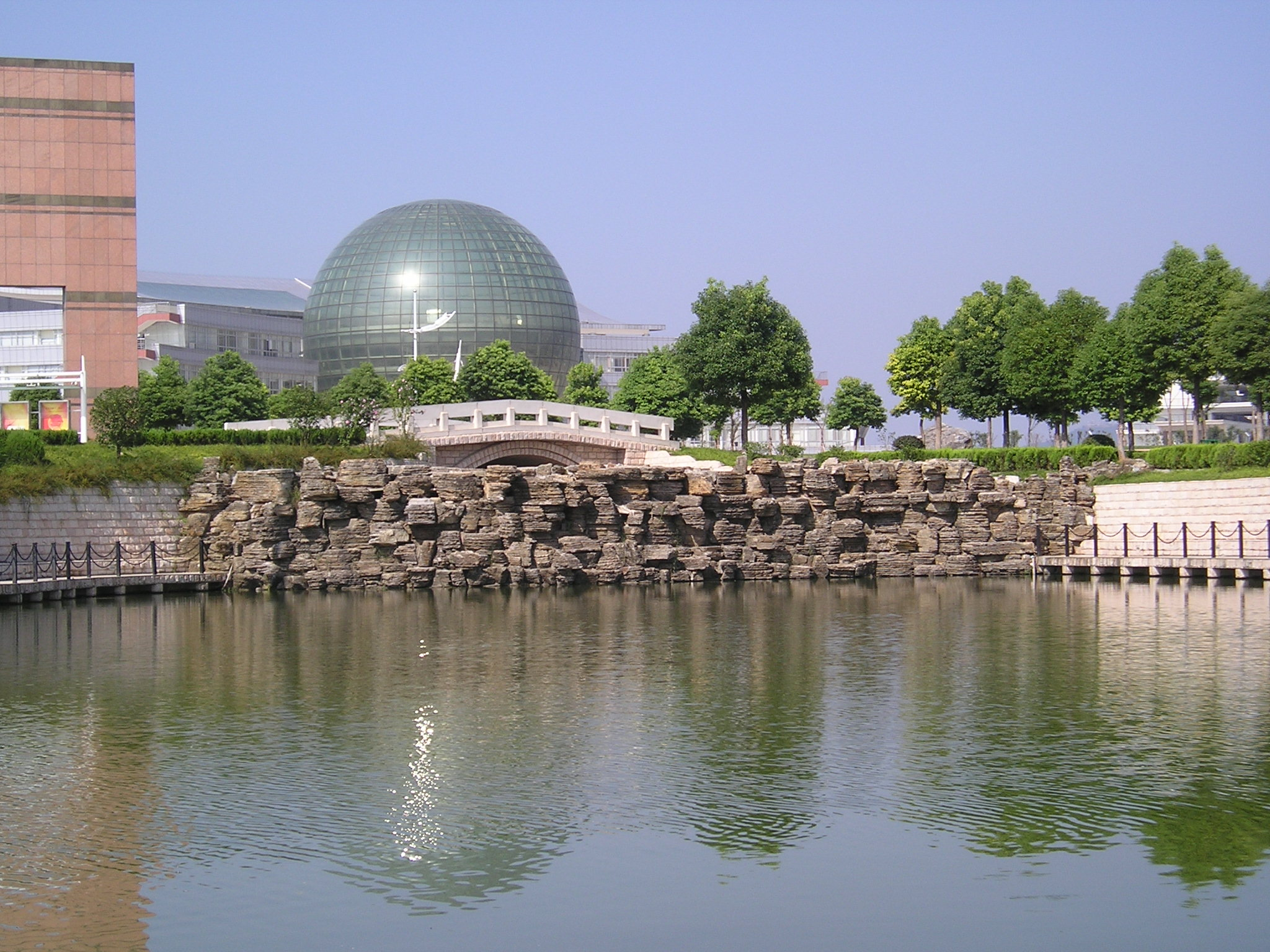
This photo is in the Xianlin campus. The large spherical building is the library. There are many small man-made lakes on campus, such as the one pictured here.

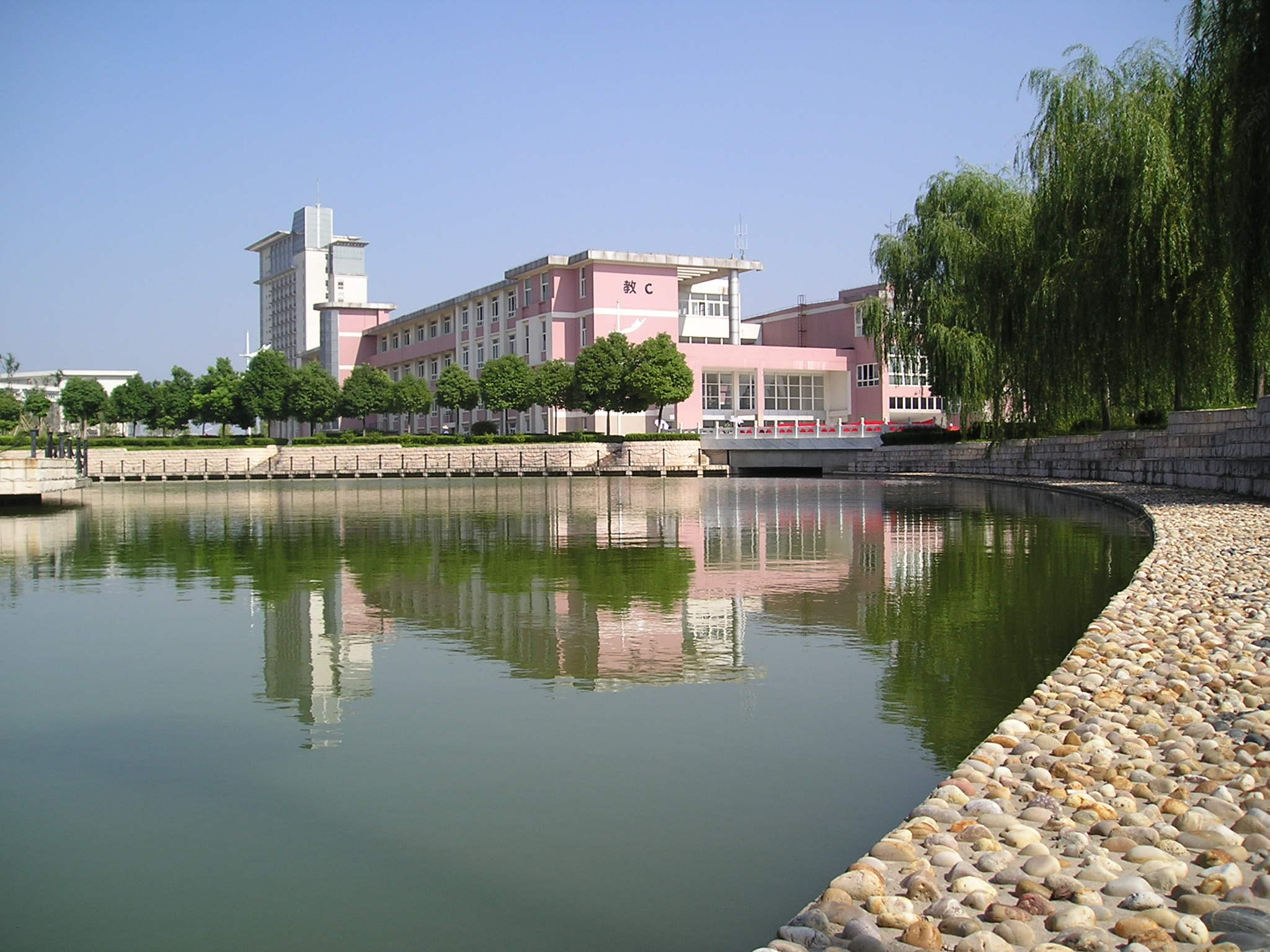
Another vantage point of the same lake as pictured above.

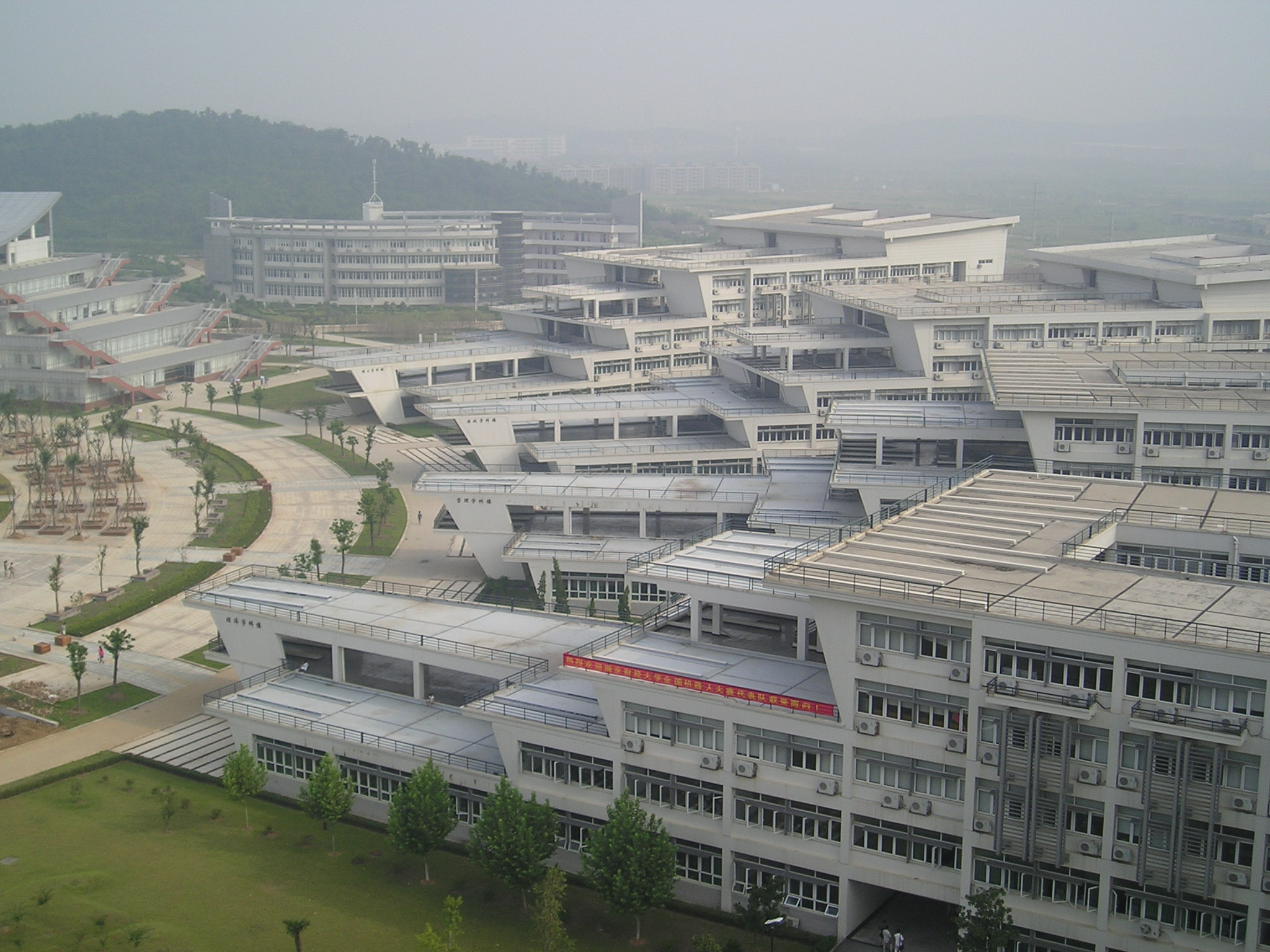
These are some of the buildings where classes are held at the Xianlin campus. They are commonly referred to as the "Z Buildings" because they are called Z1, Z2, Z3, and Z4. "Z" stands for "Zhuan ye" -- which means "Special Field of Study".

The Nanjing University of Finance & Economics has three campuses. One on Fujian Road in the city centre, one at the new university city (Yadong District) 15 kilometres (9.3 mi) outside Nanjing called Xianlin, and a small campus approximately 40 kilometres (25 mi) away from the Nanjing city centre in a village called Qiaotou. The University was restarted since 2000 by the combination of local specialised colleges. A variety of majors/programmes are available. Students are generally trained to have professional Chinese-English bilingual skills.

== Rankings ==
As of 2025, the Nanjing University of Finance and Economics ranked #3 in East China and #10 nationwide among universities in China according to the Best Chinese Universities Ranking. The Nanjing University of Finance and Economics has been ranked amongst the top #400 with its strong research branches can be ranked 50 to 150 in the world.
