= Jiangsu Normal University =

University in Xuzhou, China

- 江苏师范大学
- Type: Provincial, Public
- Established: 1952; 74 years ago
- President: Ren Ping
- Undergraduates: 25,000
- Location: Xuzhou, Jiangsu, China
- Campus: Urban area: Quanshan (main campus); Yunlong; Kuiyuan; Suburban: Jiawang
- Colours
- Website: www.jsnu.edu.cn

Jiangsu Normal University (simplified Chinese: 江苏师范大学; traditional Chinese: 江蘇師範大學; pinyin: Jiāngsū Shīfàn Dàxué) is a provincial key university located in Xuzhou, Jiangsu province, China. It was jointly constructed by the Chinese Ministry of Education and the Government of Jiangsu Province.

== History ==
The university was established in 1952 as the Jiangsu Wuxi Business Cadre School in Southern Jiangsu's Wuxi. In 1956, the Chinese Ministry of Education granted permission for the school to become a higher education institution. Its name was changed to Jiangsu Normal Academy. In August 1958, the Jiangsu Normal Academy relocated to Xuzhou city in North Jiangsu. In March 1959, Xuzhou Normal Academy was merged with Jiangsu Normal Academy and became the Xuzhou Normal College, and became the only undergraduate college in North Jinagsu. In early 1960s, due to Zhou Enlai's suggestion that there should be a college in vast north Jiangsu, it avoided the fate of disappearing in the layout of higher education system.

During the Culture Revolution, once it changed its name to Huaihai College (淮海大学) by Red Guard, and stopped recruiting students for six years. In 1979, it began to recruit postgraduates, and it became one of the first batch of universities than could confer master's degree in China in 1981. In 1989, the Second Xuzhou Normal Academy (founded in 1984) was merged into Xuzhou Normal College. In 1996, Chinese Ministry of Education approved the college to upgrade to university. It was renamed as Xuzhou Normal University. In 1999, the State Coal Bureau's Xuzhou Industrial College merged into Xuzhou Normal University.

Xuzhou Normal University was renamed as Jiangsu Normal University in 2011.

Jiangsu Wuxi Business Cadre School (1952); Wuxi
Jiangsu Normal Academy (1956); Wuxi
Jiangsu Normal Academy (1958); Xuzhou
Xuzhou Normal College (1959); Xuzhou
Xuzhou Normal University (1996); Xuzhou
Jiangsu Normal University (2011); Xuzhou

== Main campuses ==
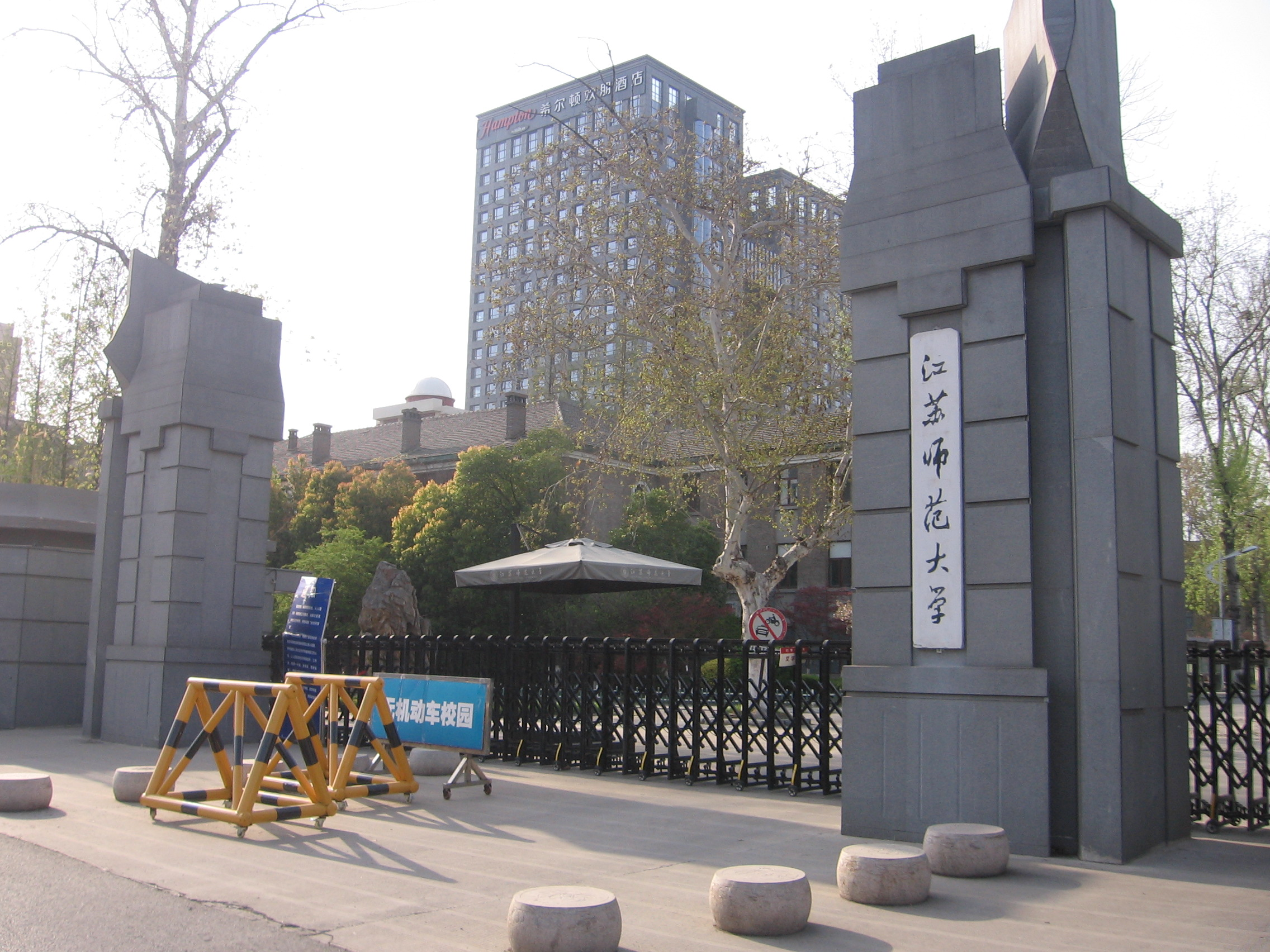
Main Entrance of Yunlong Campus

Jiangsu Normal University is made up of four campuses currently.

- Quanshan Campus (泉山校区), is the primary and biggest campus, and was built from 1985.
- Yunlong Campus (云龙校区), which is the oldest, built in 1950s.
- Jiawang Campus (贾汪校区), which is located in the exurbanof Xuzhou City. It was the campus of Xuzhou Industrial College.
- Kuiyuan Campus (奎园校区), which used to be the campus of the Second Xuzhou Normal Academy.

The four campuses cover around 122 thousands square meters with nearly one million square meters of building space.

== Teaching staff ==
There are 1358 full-time teachers, including 218 professors, 445 assistant professors, and 313 doctors. Moreover, there are 2 academicians of Chinese Academy of Sciences and 1 committee member of the Chinese Academy of Social Sciences.

== Schools and departments ==
- School of Linguistic Sciences
  - Neurolinguistics; fMRI and ERPs for Language Sciences; Theoretical linguistics; Engineering Linguistics; Teaching Chinese to Speakers of Other Languages; China Minority Linguistics; Chinese Language
- School of Literature
  - Chinese Language and Literature(non-normal); Chinese Language and Literature (high-level secretarial); Chinese Language
- College of Foreign Languages
  - English (normal, commercial, translate); Japanese; Russian; Spanish; International Marketing
- School of Educational Science
  - Elementary Education; Psychological Education; Preprimary Education; Applied Psychology
- Institute of Mathematical Sciences
  - Mathematics and Applied Mathematics; Information and Computing Science; Statistics
- Physical Culture Institute
  - Physical Education; Science of Ethnic Traditional Sports; Athletic Training
- Academy of Fine Arts
  - Fine Arts; Fine Arts(normal); Artistic Designing Program; Drawing
- School of Economics
  - Economics; International Commerce; International Economy and Trade
- College of Life Science
  - Biological Science; Biotechnology; Gardening and Zoological Science
- College of Information and Communication
  - Advertising Program; Radio and Television Journalism; Radio and TV Editing
- History and Culture and Tourism Institute
  - History; Tourist Management; Culture Industry Management
- School of law and Politics
  - Law; International Trade Laws; Ideological and Political Education; Politics and Administration; Social Work
- Physical and Electronic Engineering Institute
  - Physics, Electronics Science and Technology; Electronic Information Engineering and Optical Information Science and Technology
- College of Chemistry and Chemical Engineering
  - Applied Chemistry; Chemistry; Pharmaceutical Engineering and Environmental Engineering
- College of Landscape and Animal Science
- School of City and Environmental Science
  - School of City and Environmental Science Geosciences; Urban and Rural Planning & Resource management; Geographic Information System; Environmental Science
- Faculty of Management
  - Marketing Management; Financial Management; Administrative; Logistics Management; Public Enterprise Management
- School of Geodesy and Geomatics
  - Surveying and Mapping Engineering; Land Resource Management; Remote Sensing Technology
- The College of Mechanical Engineering
  - Mechanical Engineering; Machinery Electronics; CNC Technology;
- Electrical Engineering and Automation Institute
- Academy of Music
