= College of Teacher Education of Nanjing Normal University =

The College of Teacher Education of Nanjing Normal University (Chinese: 南京师范大学教师教育学院) is one of twenty-three colleges of Nanjing Normal University. It was proposed in 2005 and came into existence in 2010. The college has 10 majors and the total enrolment is on a large scale.

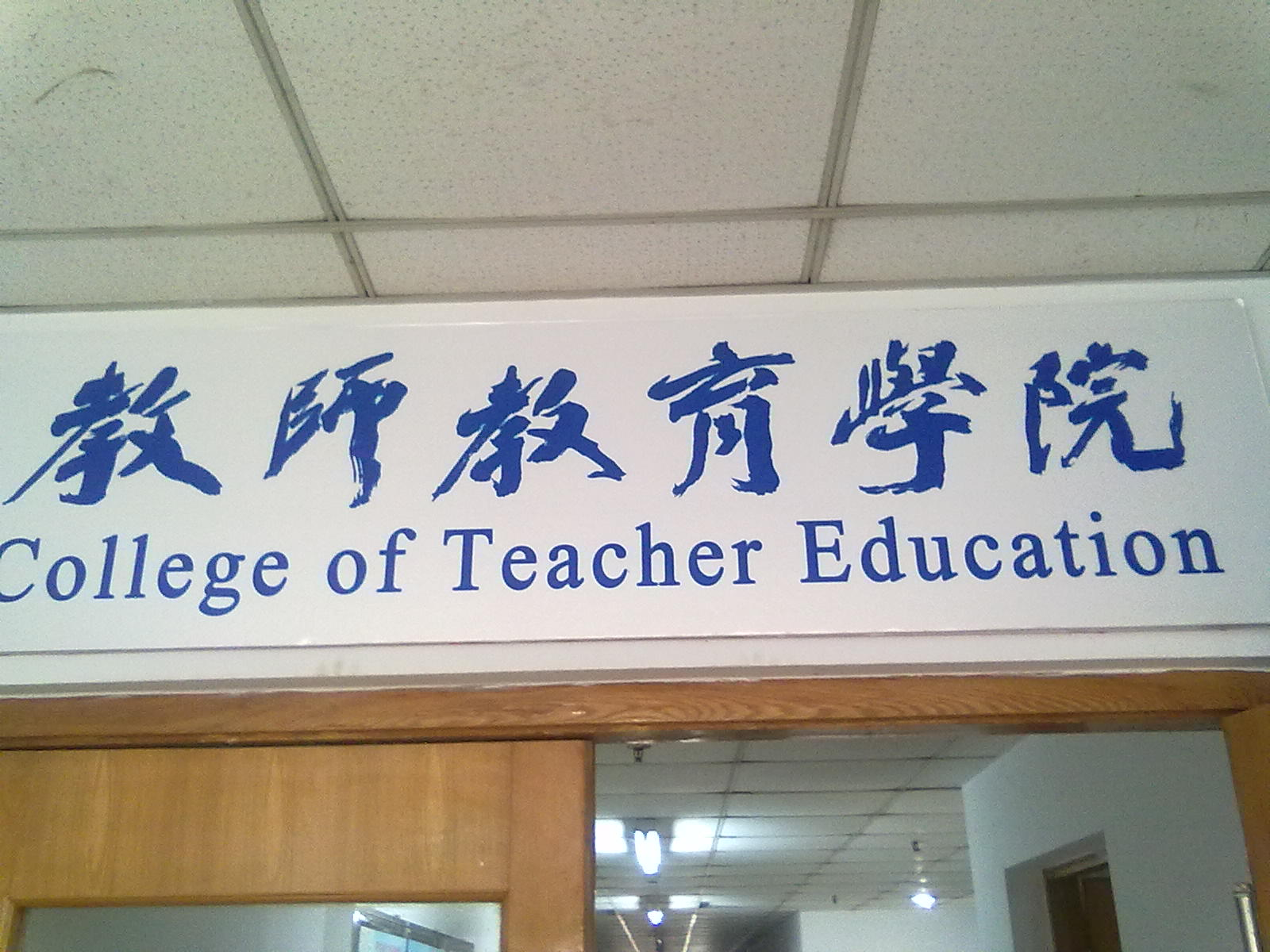
The entrance to the College of Teacher Education

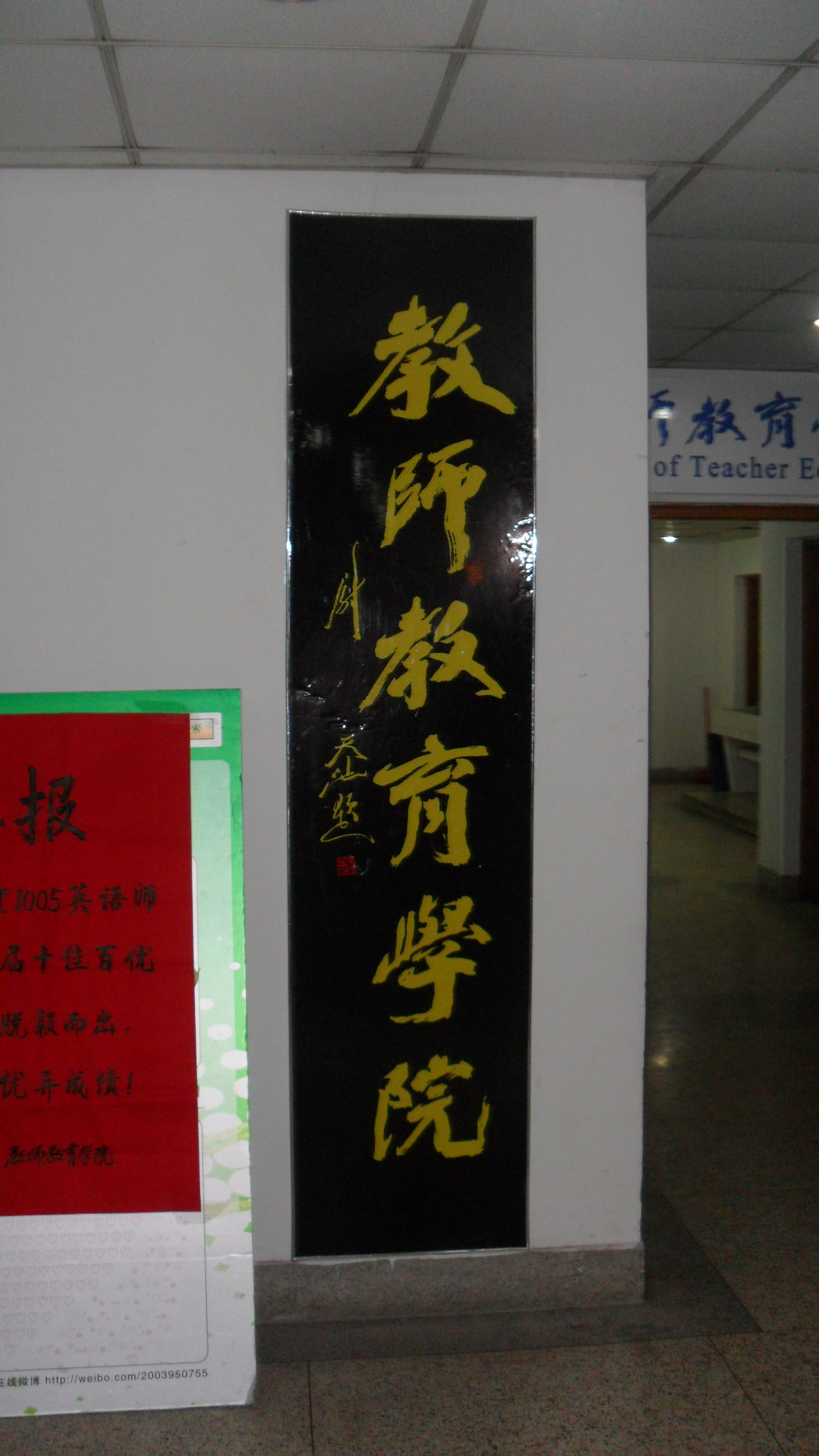
the College of Teacher Education of Nanjing Normal University

== Introduction ==
As the southern birthplace of China's education of teachers, Nanjing Normal University has developed into a comprehensive university with a distinct feature of teacher education. The title “the southern birthplace of China's education of teachers” given to Nanjing Normal University is intended to honor its long history in teacher education. Nanjing Normal University has a history more than 100 years, its predecessor was dating from Three Rivers Normal School which established in 1902. In this period, many celebrities were born here. They are the great Chinese educator Tao Xingzhi, the famous Chinese educator Wu Yifang, the Chinese early childhood educationist Chen Heqin the artist Xu Beihong and so on. To respond to the call of Chinese government and conform to the trend of teacher's professional development in China, the university founded the faculty of Teachers' Education in 2010.

Before the foundation of the faculty, effort had been put into the project. Since the construction programme of the new undergraduate course about the teacher education was put into effort in 2005, an experience on the reformation of "2.5+1.5" developing pattern was conducted, which targeted the normal students of 2007, 2008 and 2009 on campus. When a university is on the “2.5+1.5” developing pattern in China, the university students are expected to learn the basic and general knowledge in the beginning two and half years of university. While in the last one and half years of university, the students will be exposed to specialized and professional subjects. Double-tutors system has been set up in the course of graduation design.

== The faculty today ==
Ten academic majors have been gathered in the faculty. They are English teaching，chemistry teaching, history teaching, physics teaching, mathematics teaching, Chinese teaching, biology teaching, geography teaching, politics teaching and computer teaching. literally, these academic majors belong to the faculty of Teachers' Education. Actually, the teacher - training students are also exposed to other relevant professional resources from other colleges in Nanjing Normal University. For example, the English teaching student will be cultivated by both the College of Teacher Education and College of Foreign Languages of Nanjing Normal University.
The faculty today has 112 specialized teachers with 26 professors and 34 associate professors. The dean of the faculty is Xia Jinwen (Chinese: 夏锦文)who is also the vice-president of Nanjing Normal University.

== Students’ Organizations ==
In China, universities provide students with opportunities to challenge and promote their sophisticated abilities in addition to their academic level. In this way, various students’ organizations spring like mushroom. There are four major organizations in this college. They are the Students’ Union, the Youth Volunteers Association, the Youth League general branch and the Mental Weather Station. The four organizations almost cover all the aspects of students’ activities.

=== The Students' Union ===
The leading organization is the Students’ Union, which consists of 8 separate and distinctive departments. It is operated by students themselves for its chairman is selected from students in the college. To ensure necessary help from the college is available and punctual, a certain teacher acts as a supervisor to the organization. The organization's responsibility is to organize varied and extensive activities on the behalf of students.

=== Youth League general branch ===
As to Youth League general league, it deals with the issues related to the Communist Youth League and the Chinese Communist Party. For example, if a student in the Teacher's College submits an application to join the Chinese Communist Party, then the general branch will inspect and determine the student's qualification. Apart from that, to assist the students to accomplish their summer social practice is what they are working on.

=== The Youth Volunteers Association ===
Volunteer work is an essential part of university life, so the Youth Volunteers Association is supposed to provide information and opportunities about the available volunteer work, both in school and in society.

=== The Mental Weather Station ===
These three organizations mentioned above are customary ones of a college while the Mental Weather Station is set aside from the Students’ Union particularly. This organization caters to the affairs of state that more and more university students are suffering pressure。 In the way, more professional advice and instant help is in touch for the students in the College of Teacher Education whenever needed.
