= Mary Nourse =

American educator and writer

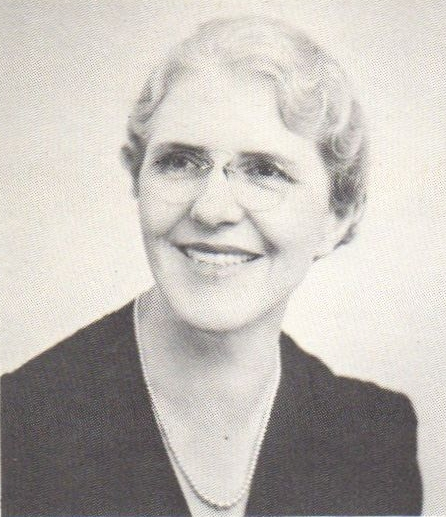
Mary Nourse in 1966

Mary Augusta Nourse (1880–1971) was an American educator and writer on China and the Far East, and a co-founder of Jinling College in Nanjing. The best-known of her several books was her first, a popular history of China titled The Four Hundred Million.

== Early life and education ==
Nourse was born to Edwin Henry and Harriett Augusta Beaman Nourse of Lockport, New York on March 11, 1880. She was the sister of novelist Alice Tisdale Hobart and economist Edwin Nourse. The family later moved to Downers Grove, Illinois, in the suburbs of Chicago.

Nourse attended Shimer College, which at the time was located in Mount Carroll, Illinois and served as a women's preparatory school for the University of Chicago. She graduated from Shimer in 1899 and continued to the University of Chicago, receiving her Ph.B. in 1905.

== Educational work in China ==
Our faith in the possibilities of the institution now that the first class is really here are boundless.
—Mary Nourse, 1915

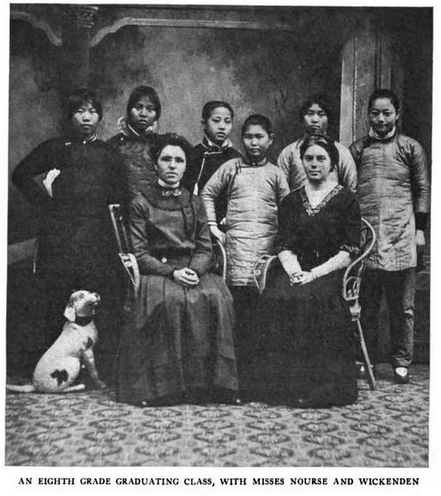
Mary A. Nourse, Miss Wickenden, and their eighth-grade students at the Union Girls' School, Hangzhou, China; from a 1912 publication.

After completing her college education, Nourse briefly taught high school in Rensselaer, Indiana. Soon thereafter, however, she traveled to China to work as an educator and Baptist missionary. She taught for a number of years at Wayland Academy in Hangzhou, where she also served for a time as principal.

Nourse has traditionally been considered one of the founders of Jinling College, a women's school in Nanjing, based on her having been one of the signatories of a petition circulated in 1911-1912 calling for a women's college in the Yangtze River valley.

Nourse was also among the school's six-member faculty when it opened on September 17, 1915, teaching psychology and history to an entering class of 11 students. Women's education had been encouraged by an imperial decree in 1907, but Jinling was the first women's college to open in China. Of the 11 women in Jinling's 1915 entering class, 5 graduated, becoming the first women in China to receive a baccalaureate degree.

Among these first graduates was Wu Yi-Fang, who later became president of the college. Under Dr. Fang's leadership, the school served as a refuge during the Nanjing Massacre in 1937–1938.

Nourse taught history and psychology at Jinling College until 1918. She left on furlough, but did not return, instead continuing her education in the United States. She enrolled at the University of Wisconsin, where she completed her master's degree in 1919. Her thesis was on the historical development of "Open Door" diplomacy in China.

== Later career ==
After completing her master's degree, Nourse wrote widely on Far Eastern history. Her first book, The Four Hundred Million, ran to several editions in the late 1930s and early 1940s, and was translated into French, German, Polish, and Hebrew. Reviewing the book in Foreign Affairs, historian William L. Langer called it "a well-written and illustrated survey of Chinese history."

She authored a similar popular history of Japan, titled Kodo: The Way of the Emperor, which was published in 1940. Other works included China, Country of Contrasts (1944) and Ferment in the Far East (1949).

Nourse taught history at Pine Manor Junior College in 1933–1934, and subsequently for many years at Mount Vernon Seminary in Washington, DC. She continued to write magazine articles on topics related to East Asia into the 1960s.

Nourse served in the Society of Woman Geographers, including a term as president. In 1965, she received a distinguished alumni award from Shimer College for her contributions to the social sciences.

Nourse died in Washington, DC, in October 1971, at the age of 91.

== Writings ==
- The Four Hundred Million: A Short History of the Chinese (1935)
- Kodo, The Way Of The Emperor: A Short History Of The Japanese (1940)
- China, country of contrasts (1944)
- A Short History of the Chinese (1944)
- Ferment in the Far East, an historical interpretation (1949)

== Works cited ==
- Thurston, Matilda S. Calder; Chester, Ruth Miriam (1956). Ginling College.
- Vautrin, Minnie (2008). Terror in Minnie Vautrin's Nanjing: Diaries and Correspondence, 1937-38. University of Illinois Press. ISBN 9780252033322.
