= Yang Jinlong =

Yang Jinlong may refer to:

- Yang Chin-long (born 1953), Taiwanese economist, Governor of the Central Bank of the Republic of China
- Yang Jinlong (chemist) (born 1966), Chinese chemist, Vice President of the University of Science and Technology of China
