= Hiltner =

Hiltner is a surname. Notable people with the surname include:

- Frederica Mead Hiltner (1890–1977), American missionary teacher in China, 1915–1922
- Michael Hiltner (born 1941), American author, poet, designer, and cyclist
- Mike Hiltner (born 1966), American ice hockey player
- W. Albert Hiltner (1914–1991), American astronomer
  - 4924 Hiltner, a main-belt asteroid
