= Zee Yuh-tsung =

Chinese diplopmat (1894-1981)

- Born: 1894; Jiangsu, China
- Died: February 1, 1981 (aged 86–87); St. Petersburg, Florida
- Other name: Mrs. Way-sung New or Mrs. Yuh-tsung New
- Citizenship: United States
- Education: Columbia University
- Occupation: Diplomat
- Spouse: Dr. Way-sung New

Yuh-tsung Zee (or Zee Yuh-tsung, Chinese: 徐亦蓁 or 徐蘅; 1894 in Jiangsu, China- February 1, 1981 in St. Petersburg, Florida) was a Chinese diplomat in the middle of the 20th century.

Zee (徐) was her maiden name (family name) in Wu. Yuh-tsung (亦蓁) was her first name (after the family name in China). Zee Yuh-tsung (also Tsu Ih-djen) is Xu Yizhen (in Pinyin romanization) or Hsü I-chen in Mandarin (Wade–Giles romanization). In the United States and the United Nations, Zee was also known by her husband's name as Mrs. Way-sung New or Mrs. Yuh-tsung New.

== Origin and training ==
Zee was born in Jiangsu, China in 1894. Her family had been Christian for three generations. She graduated from the Elizabeth Yates Memorial All Girls' School in Shanghai in 1910 and taught in private schools in Shanghai from 1910 to 1915. In the spring of 1915 she began studying history and education at Ginling College of the Nanjing Normal University. She graduated in 1919 as a first-time graduate with a B.A. In Ginling, she formed a lifelong friendship with Wu Yi-fang, who later became Ginling's first Chinese president.

== Professional activity, social, political work and family ==
After her training, Zee worked as a teacher in Nanjing and Beijing. In this area of activity, she headed the Chinese Child Relief Committee based in Shanghai. In 1924 she married the orthopedist Dr. Way-sung New. After her marriage, she continued to do professional and voluntary work. She served as chair of the school trustees of Shanghai Methodist School and Ginling College, was active in charitable work, and led training programs for nurses at her husband's clinic. During this time, she also completed an M.A. degree from Teachers College at Columbia University. In 1928 their son Peter was born. After her husband's death in 1937, she devoted herself intensively to humanitarian work with the International Red Cross and Red Crescent Movement in war-torn Shanghai until 1939. From 1939 to 1941 she taught English again at St. Stephen's College in Hong Kong. In 1945, she took part in the preparations of the Chinese delegation for the San Francisco conference, which included her friend Wu Yi Fang. In 1947, she was a founding member of the United Nations Commission on the Status of Women, which worked on the formulation of the International Bill of Human Rights. From 1949 to 1955 she worked as a lecturer at various institutions in the United States. In 1955 she became associate dean at Western College for Women in Oxford, Ohio. She held this office until 1959. She then focused on work at her church and for the Ginling Alumni Group. In 1961 she became a citizen of the United States. She died in 1981.
