= Xianlin University City =

Area of Nanjing, China

Coordinates: 32.098953°N 118.912989°E

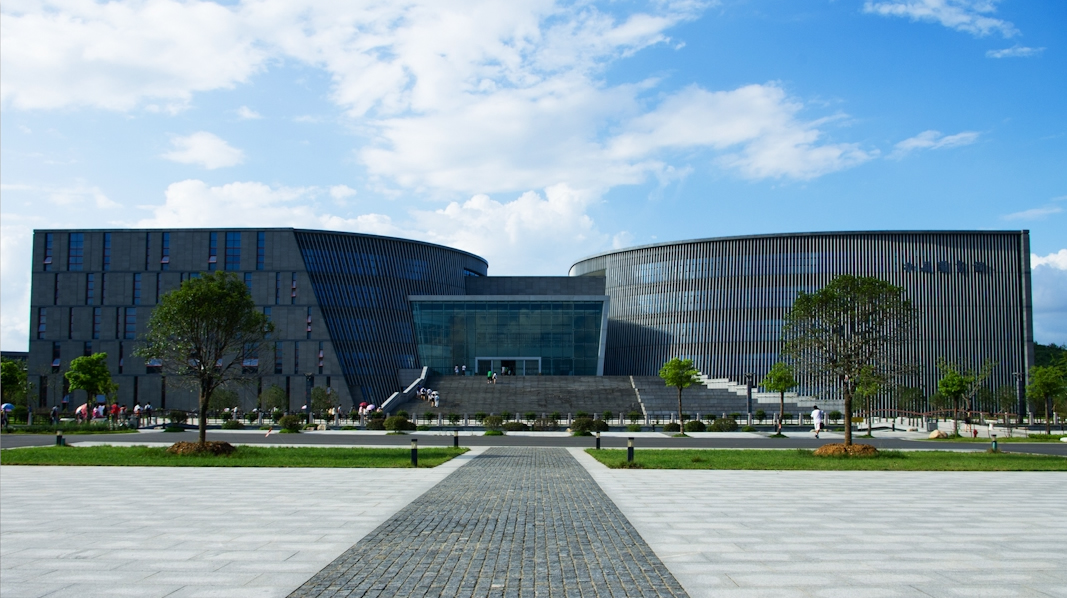
Du Xia Library on Nanjing University Xianlin Campus

Xianlin University City (Chinese: 仙林大学城; pinyin: Xiān Lín Dà Xué Chéng), colloquially known as Xianlin (lit. 'Fairy Forest'), is a community in Nanjing, China, featuring a number of leading higher education institutions. It is located in the middle of Qixia District and to the northeast of Purple Mountain, 15 kilometers (approx. 9 miles) from Xinjiekou, the central business area of the city. Planned in 1995 and established in 2002, Xianlin is the earliest university city in China, followed by other famous higher education hubs like Songjiang University City and Guangzhou University City. Xianlin is the home to 12 higher education institutions, such as Nanjing University, Nanjing Normal University, and Nanjing University of Posts and Telecommunications, enabling them to share academic resources conveniently.

== History ==
In 1989, when Xianlin was an undeveloped rural property of Nanjing, the government made the decision to develop the Xianlin area to meet the demands of urban expansion. The area was planned as a higher education hub in 1995, and construction began seven years later. In 2001, the area was officially named Xianlin University City. The first university to open a campus in Xianlin was Nanjing Normal University.

In November 2011, an Undergraduate Education Teach Council was established by Nanjing Normal University, Nanjing University, Nanjing University of Finance and Economics, Nanjing University of Posts and Telecommunications, and Nanjing University of Chinese Medicine. The council was created to promote modern higher education practices to attract international university students and keep pace with new trends in education.

In 2011, the School of Geography of Nanjing Normal University conducted a major research project to evaluate different aeration methods for removing high levels of nitrogen from a heavily polluted river in the Xianlin University Town.

The "Xianlin Science City Development Consortium" was formed by 12 universities on February 25, 2012, to cooperate on research, sharing resources, event planning and the development of a "science city", with each university having its own science facilities.

Lu Bing, the deputy mayor of Nanjing at the time, was responsible for the oversight of the Management Committee of Xianlin University City as of 2014.

== Education ==
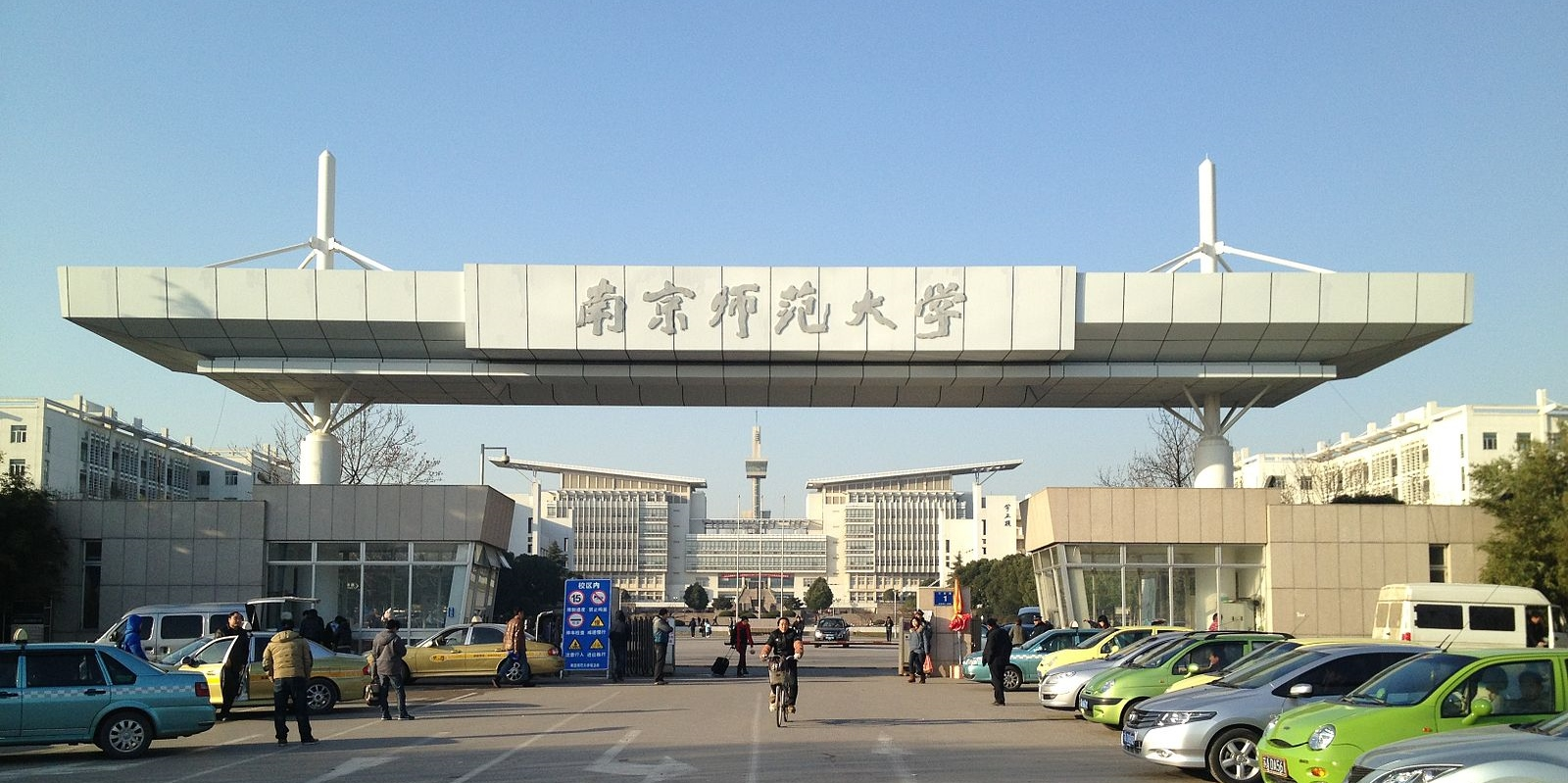
Nanjing Normal University

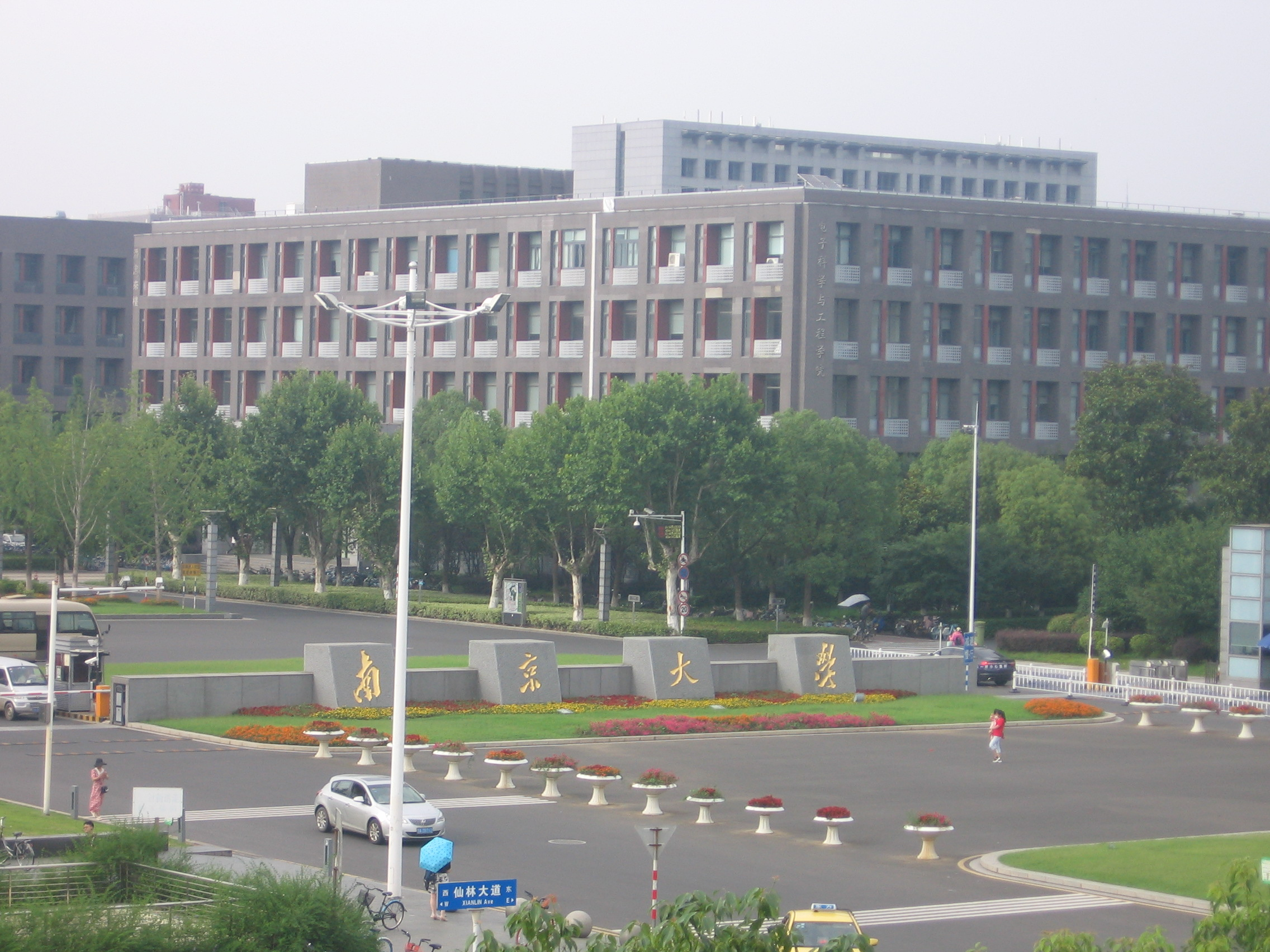
Nanjing University

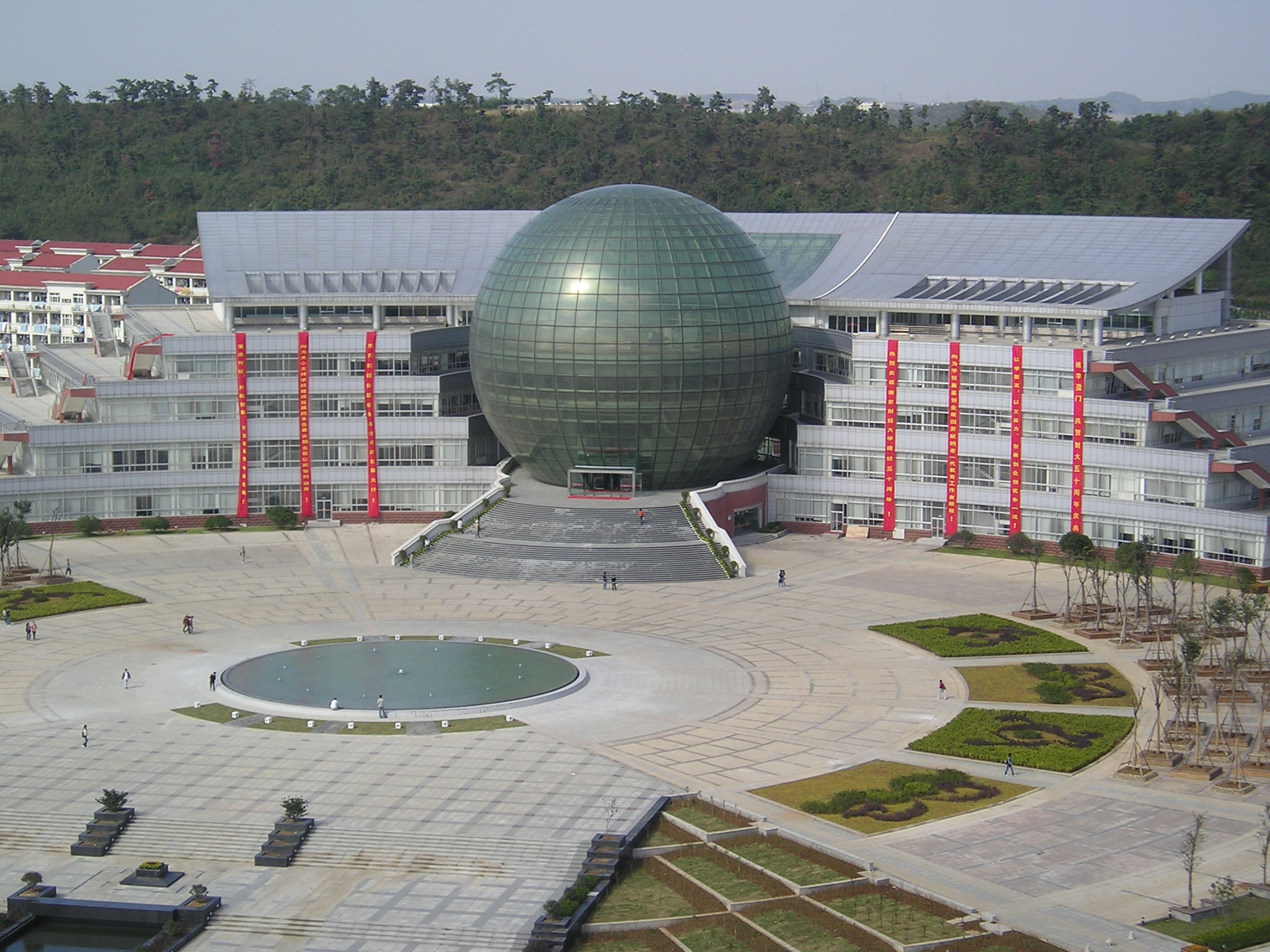
Nanjing University of Finance and Economics

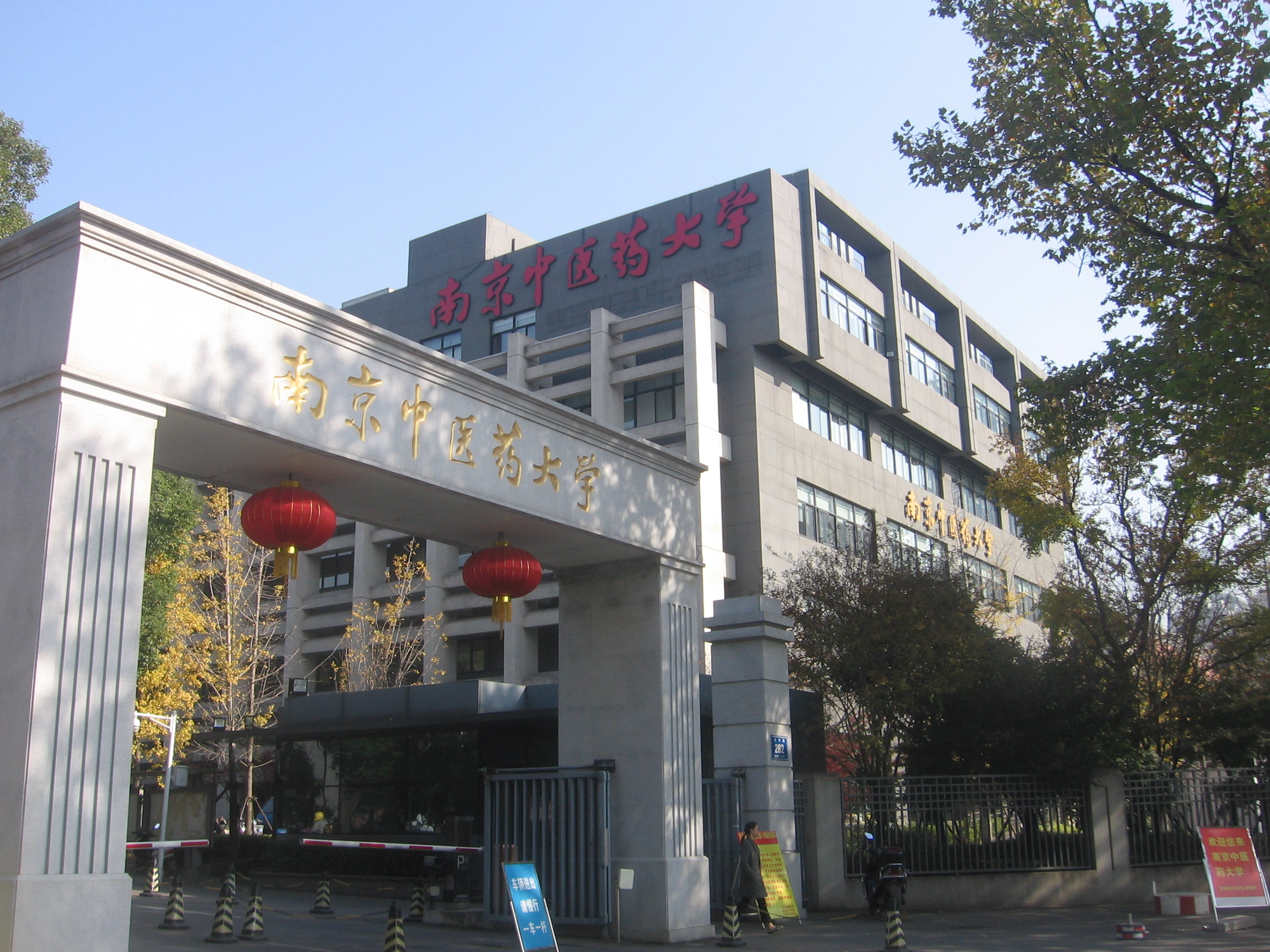
Nanjing University of Chinese Medicine

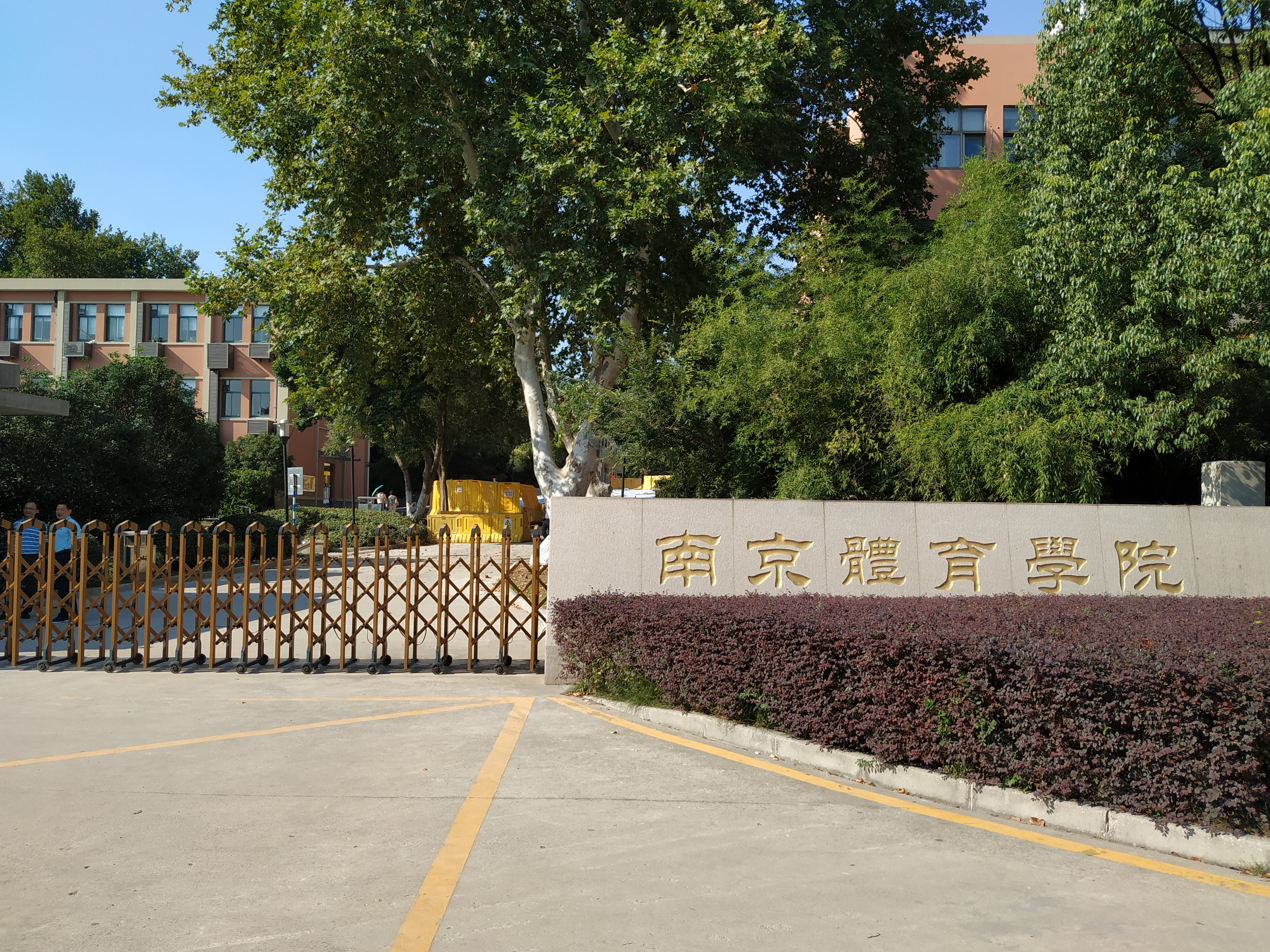
Nanjing Sport Institute

There are 12 universities with their main campuses in Xianlin University City, including:

- Nanjing University (Project 985, Project 211, Double First-Class Construction)
- Nanjing Normal University (Project 211, Double First-Class Construction)
- Nanjing University of Posts and Telecommunications (Double First-Class Construction)
- Nanjing University of Chinese Medicine (Double First-Class Construction)
- Nanjing University of Finance and Economics
- Nanjing Sport Institute
- Nanjing Forest Police College
- Nanjing Normal University Zhongbei College
- Nanjing University of Science and Technology Zijin College
- Nanjing Audit University Jinshen College
- Nanjing Vocational University of Industry Technology
- Nanjing Vocational College of Information Technology

Nanjing Foreign Language School, one of the most famous high schools in China, also established a campus in Xianlin University City.

== Transportation ==
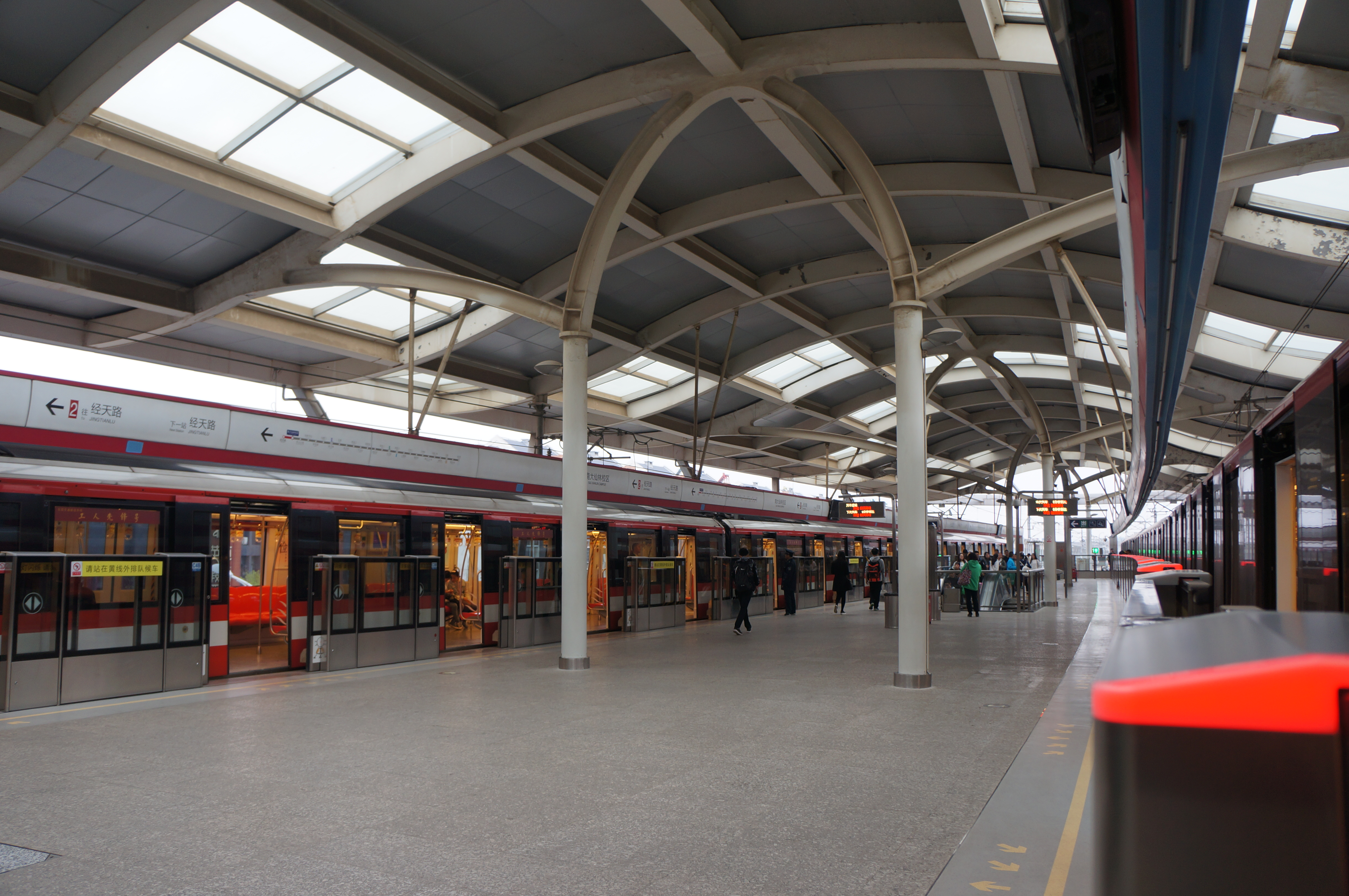
Metro station in Xianlin University City

There are 2 metro lines and nearly 20 bus lines across Xianlin University City. Line 2 and Line 4 of the Nanjing Metro provide easy access to most of the universities and commercial areas of the university city.

Xianlin Railway Station on the Shanghai-Nanjing Intercity High-speed Railway was opened in July 2010. With high-speed bullet trains, it takes 15 minutes from Xianlin to Zhenjiang, and less than 1 hour to Shanghai, Suzhou, Wuxi, and Changzhou.
