= NNU =

NNU may refer to:

- Northwest Nazarene University
- National Nurses United
- Nanjing Normal University
- Nanning Normal University
