= Matilda Smyrell Calder Thurston =

1875-1958, founder and first president of Ginling College for Women

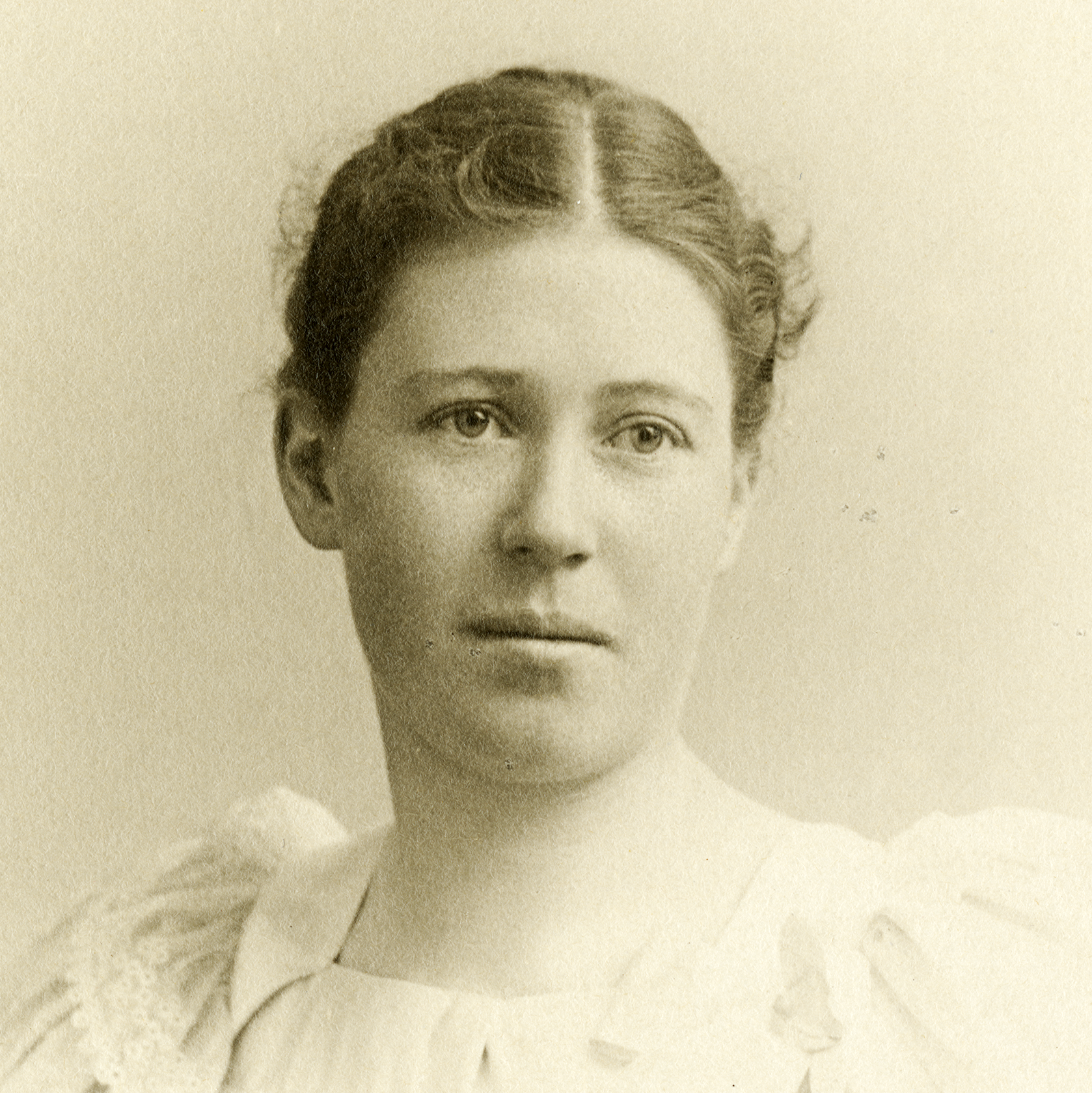
- Born: Matilda Smyrell Calder; July 24, 1875; Hartford, Connecticut
- Died: April 18, 1958 (aged 82); Auburndale, Massachusetts
- Education: Mount Holyoke College
- Occupations: Educator, missionary

Matilda Smyrell Calder Thurston (1875–1958) was an American Presbyterian educator and missionary. She is known for serving as the first president of the Ginling College in Nanjing, China.

== Biography ==
Thurston née Calder was born on May 16, 1875, in Hartford, Connecticut. She attended Mount Holyoke College. After teaching high school for several years after graduation, she married John Lawrence Thurston and the couple traveled to China. They worked at the Yale Board of Foreign Missions, returning to the United States after John contracted tuberculosis. He died in 1903 or 1904.

After her husband's death Thurston went to work for the Student Volunteer Movement for Foreign Missions. In 1906 she returned to China where she work for the Yale Mission at Changsha. In 1913 Thurston was sent to Nanjing by the Presbyterian Board of Foreign Missions. The she helped found Ginling College, a four-year college for women. She also served as the first president of the college. Thurston was president until 1928, when she was succesdeed by Wu Yi-fang.

Thurston lived in the United States from 1936 through 1939, returning to China to work on World War II relief efforts. She was interned in the early 1940s by the occupying Japanese. Upon her release she lived in Auburndale, Massachusetts. She died on April 18, 1958, in Auburndale.
