= Yangtze High School =

Public school in Nanjing, Jiangsu, China

- 南师大附属扬子中学

Location
- 500 Yuanxi Rd; Nanjing, Jiangsu; China

Information
- Type: Public
- Motto: 尽精微, 至广大. (Act subtly, act broadly)
- Established: 1984; 42 years ago
- Principal: Zhang Xiaoli (张晓莉)
- Campus size: 250 acres (100 ha)

Yangtze High School is attached to Nanjing Normal University. It is a full-time independent senior school located in the Nanjing industrial development zone. It covers an area of 250 acres, including 87,895 square meters of construction areas. Yangtze High School is a Four-Star school in Jiangsu province(江苏省四星级学校). It has earned many awards, such as "Jiangsu Province Four-Star School" (江苏省重点高中), "Jiangsu Model School" (江苏省模范学校), and National Model Public High School" (国家级示范性普通高中). Yangtze High School was founded by the Yangtze Petrochemical Group (扬子石化) in 1984. It was put under the local education department in October 2004.
