= Social Development Academy, Nanjing Normal University =

The Social Development Academy in Nanjing Normal University is an institute of the Nanjing Normal University on social development.

== History ==
Social Development Academy in Nanjing Normal University's predecessor dates back to the history and geography eclectic subject of Liangjiang Normal School in 1907. When the Nanjing Advanced Normal University was founded in 1914, the Chinese history and geography section was established at the same time. Then going through various changes, the academy established the history learning major in 1982 and social work major in 1997. After that came the archaeology major in 2000. In 2001 the academy was named the Social Development Academy in Nanjing Normal University.

== Major Structure ==
The main departments (undergraduates) are as follows:

1. The major of history (teaching and non-teaching profession)
2. The major of social and social work
3. The major of historical relics and museum (archaeology).

The academy has the authority to award the Doctorate in Specific History and the Master's Degree in the 11 departments as follows: specific history, Chinese ancient history, Chinese modern and contemporary history, historical documents, history and geography, global history, history curriculum and teaching theory, historical relics and museum, sociology, social security, folklore.

== Organization Structure ==
1. Executive office director of the department
2. Executive secretary of the department
3. Party Committee Secretary and personnel secretary
4. Undergraduate counselor: there are 3 positions including Youth League Committee secretary, Undergraduate director and Class adviser.
5. Lab management.
6. Student personnel administration: There are 2 positions including Educational administration secretary and Academic dean.
7. Graduate student instructor and secretary of scientific research.
8. Graduate student administration.
9. Book and data management.
10. Continuing education management.

== Staff ==
There are about 62 staff, including 43 teachers, amongst which are 43 professors, 20 associate professors, 4 lecturers and 1 teaching assistant. Other staff members are in charge of students' daily lives and management.

== Development ==
In recent years, the social development academy has achieved great development. In the teaching area, four teachers have been in the "top ten outstanding young teachers" and received the "teaching award"; In scientific research, the academy has won 7 subjects of national rank, and over 30 of province or ministry rank, with publishing more than 60 works, and more than 300 papers in core journals. All kinds of researches has been funded more than 5 million yuan.

The department of historical relics and museum is the first to obtain the qualification certificate of leading a team to do archaeological excavation among the Normal Universities in China.
