= Ginling College =

Women's college of Nanjing University, China

- 金陵女子大学
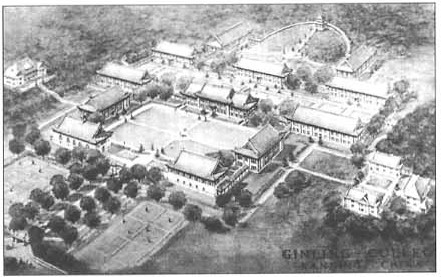
- Campus planning of Ginling College, by the architect Henry Murphy.
- Motto: 厚生
- Motto in English: Public welfare
- Type: Women's college
- Established: 1913
- Parent institution: Nanjing Normal University
- Location: Nanjing, Jiangsu, China
- Website: ginling.njnu.edu.cn (in Chinese)

Ginling College
- Simplified Chinese: 金陵女子大学
- Traditional Chinese: 金陵女子大學
Transcriptions
Standard Mandarin
- Hanyu Pinyin: Jīnlíng Nǚzǐ Dàxué
- Wade–Giles: Chin1-ling2 Nü3tzu3 Ta4-hsüeh2

Ginling College (simplified Chinese: 金陵女子大学; traditional Chinese: 金陵女子大學), also known by its pinyin romanization as Jinling College or Jinling Women's College, is a women's college of Nanjing Normal University in Nanjing, China. It offers both bachelor's and master's degrees. It offers six undergraduate majors: applied English, accounting, financial management, labor and social welfare, food science and engineering, and food quality and safety. Master's degrees are offered in food science, agricultural products processing, and storage, and women's education.

Ginling College traces its roots to the Christian college of the same name founded in 1913, which started operations in 1915 and was the first institution to grant bachelor's degrees to female students in China. The school was closed from 1951 to 1987, when it was reestablished on its previous site.

American architect and art historian Talbot Hamlin designed some of the buildings that were constructed in the 1919 to 1925 period.

Wu Yi-Fang, who was one of Ginling's first five graduates and earned a doctorate degree from the University of Michigan in 1928, became the first Chinese woman to head a college in China, heading Jinling College from 1928-51 until it merged with the University of Nanking in 1951. Wu, who became a powerful figure in the People's Republic of China as a patriotic woman educator, worked tirelessly to reopen the school. However, it did not ultimately reopen until 1987, two years after her death.

During the Nanjing Massacre, the college, led by its acting principal Minnie Vautrin, harbored over 10,000 women trying to hide from the Japanese Imperial Army.

== History ==
=== Establishment (1913~1915) ===
Ginling College was founded in 1913 against the backdrop of the Social Gospel Movement and the Student Volunteer Movement in the United States, and the increasing demand for women's education propelled by the 1911 Revolution. Through the efforts of a united board composed of eight American mission boards—Baptists (North and South), Disciples, Episcopalians, Methodists (North and South), and Presbyterians (North and South)—Ginling College officially opened in 1915 with six faculty and eleven students. All subjects were taught in English except for the Chinese classics. The first graduating class, consisting of five women, including future Gingling College President Wu Yifang, graduated in 1919. They became the first women in China to receive fully accredited Bachelor of Arts degrees. Matilda Thurston, a Mount Holyoke graduate who had previously been with the Yale Mission in Changsha, served as the first president of the college from 1913 to 1928. In August 1928, Wu Yifang—a Ginling graduate—was inaugurated as the next president.

=== During the Second Sino-Japanese War (1937~1945) ===
When the war broke out between Imperial Japan and China, the members of the college had to disperse to different parts of China while the Nanjing campus was turned into a refugee camp under the supervision of Minnie Vautrin. On December 8, 1937, the first 300 women and children were admitted to the Nanjing campus. Nanjing was captured on December 13, marking the beginning of the Nanjing massacre that lasted for more than a month. At its peak, the campus provided a refuge for nearly 10,000 people. Vautrin herself patrolled the campus chasing away soldiers, visited the Japanese Embassy to ask for protection, and organized the sale of rice in mat sheds that had been erected on the college grounds. She also started Bible classes, and with the help of the refugee women, created a list of missing men to present to the Japanese Embassy. The Nanking International Relief Committee supplied food and fuel for the camp. Once the refugee phase of the work became less urgent, Vautrin diverted her attention to education—opening a middle school, a day school, and a nursery school on the Ginling campus, and providing Homecraft course for “destitute women.” In April 1940, she suffered a nervous breakdown and was taken back to the U.S. The evacuated students and faculty members started “Ginling centers” as part of other missionary institutions in Shanghai, Wuchang, and Chengdu. The Ginling center at Wuchang began when Huachung University accepted thirty Ginling students as guest students. As time went on, more faculty joined the unit and taught at least one course which Huachung University was needing. In return, Ginling students were admitted to all the regular departments of the university. As the war developed, Ginling College worked together with Huachung University and Wuchang Y.W.C.A to carry on a dressing station for the wounded soldiers. However, as it became obvious that the next objective of the Japanese army would be to capture Hankou and Wuchang, many students began to leave. By the end of 1937, only a few Ginling members remained.

=== Under the Communist Party (1949~1951) ===
Under the new Communist government, Ginling's curriculum had to incorporate some political requirements. Even though these were not different from the earlier requirement of learning Party Principles under the Nationalist government, Thurston argues that the new Communist requirements were more serious because they contained "more definite challenges to Christian beliefs." The college life went on very much as before, except for the frequent interruptions in school work for special lectures, parades, and other political functions. Religious activities also continued without any direct opposition from the government. However, as anti-American propaganda began to rise, on November 14, 1950, some students accused their American sociology professor Helen Ferris of spreading anti-revolutionary messages and of attacking the Chinese-Korean alliance. This led to widespread criticisms of not only Ferris, but of "crimes of cultural imperialism" happening in many missionary schools in China. With such hostile atmosphere, all American missionary faculty members left Ginling by spring semester 1951, either by deportation or voluntarily. Some Chinese faculty members who did not completely identify with the aggressive campaign also faced persecution. On December 17, 1950, the U.S. State Department ordered freezing of all Chinese properties in the U.S. and outlawed sending funds to China—making the Smith College's engagement with Ginling impossible. Without its main source of the budget, Ginling accepted government funding and merged with the University of Nanking to form a public National Jinling University. Ginling College reopened in 1987 as part of Nanjing Normal University through the efforts of alumnae and Wu Yifang.

== Academics and Educational Programs ==
=== 1915-1951 ===
Jin Feng has argued that Ginling's founders belonged to the group of "modernists" in the mission field who were more interested in preparing elite Chinese women for "Christian leadership," than in converting the illiterate and poverty-stricken Chinese masses. Even though Ginling was in principle a missionary college, the faculty from the very beginning emphasized the importance of it being a "bona fide institution of higher education" that possessed rigorous academic standards. As a result, curricula taught at Ginling often mimicked the curriculums at elite American women's liberal arts colleges in New England. Ginling was especially strong in English, physical education, and home economics. Ginling had a reputation of strength in English and weakness in Chinese instruction because of its emphasis on English. Almost all courses were given in English, and the school also established an English Comprehensive Test that required all students to pass in the second semester of their second year. Physical education was designed around the missionary discourse of equating a healthy body with Christian moral character. Physical education including dance instructions at Ginling was what garnered the most attention but also gave it bad publicity. For instance, an incident in 1927 in which a group of Ginling students was found dancing with British naval men outraged the public, as it went against Chinese ideal of propriety and national pride. The Home Economics Department was established in 1938 in order to meet government regulations during wartime and to strengthen institutional collaboration with other missionary institutions while it was in Chengdu. All Home Economics majors were required to select teaching methodologies for home economics, and starting from the second year, students could choose from three areas as their majors: nutrition, child welfare and development, or art and dress. Even though the program itself the home economics program allowed missionaries to offer science courses to female students. Also, majors in child welfare and development often found themselves studying education in the U.S. after graduation and were able to become teachers in kindergarten and elementary school.

=== Today's Ginling ===
Ginling College currently offers 6 undergraduate majors, 5 master's programs, and 4 orientations for master's degree candidates. The college has 72 faculty and staff members on the payroll, with 58% of the full-time teachers possessing tenures, 55% holding doctor's degrees, and 50% with recent overseas study experience.

== Traditions ==
=== Student life ===
During its early years, the faculty members organized enjoyable group activities with students outside of the classroom setting to create a sense of familiarity and intimacy. These included designated social times with the students, and faculty-led naturalist walks and outings. According to Feng, such attempts at creating solidarity "not only institutionalized a family spirit at Ginling, but also expanded the trope of the family from the institutional to the national level, and thereby cultivated among their students a collective sense of Noblesse oblige toward their nation and people." According to the official website, these traditions also came into place under the leadership of President Wu Yifang:

1. Chinese and western cultures were integrated. The "Abundant Life" was interpreted as the guiding ideology for cultivating Ginling College students. It required students not only to master their basic and professional knowledge well, but also to have noble dreams. They should be diligent, tough and selfless at their posts and dedicate their lifetime to others, society and nation with their own wisdom and strength.
2. Student autonomy and tutorial system were combined to manage students. There was a head teacher for every grade and a tutor for every 8 students. The tutor instructed students' life and study with skill and patience. There was an instructor in students' life for each dormitory building.
3. The sister-class system was put into practice. Senior "sisters" gave instructions on daily studies and life of junior "sisters" and led them to adapt to the change from a middle school to a college. Therefore, the younger sisters benefited a lot and the elder sisters strengthened their sense of responsibility and pride and thus became stricter with themselves, through which they promoted each other.
4. Students' physical exercise was valued. Every fresher got a health card since she entered college so that teachers could teach students in accordance with their aptitude. The 4-year compulsory PE lessons aimed at improving students' physique. Students' musicianship was also valued. The one-year music lessons taught basic knowledge and skills of music like producing sound and reading music. Besides, students could take courses in the Department of Music and participate in the activities held by the chorus or choir to improve their musicianship.

=== Academic Year Events ===
Founders' Day was observed every year to celebrate the founders who did pioneer work in the education of women in China. They include: Mary A. Nourse, Sophie Lanneau, Emma A. Lyon, Katherine E. Phelps, Laura E. White, Martha E. Pyle, Mary Cogdal, Venie J. Lee. Founders' Day was cherished even during exile, as it became a symbol of "unity of spirit" despite the dispersal of Ginling women.

== Architecture ==
=== The House of a Hundred Rooms (1915~1923) ===
Ginling's first home was an old-style Chinese residence in Embroidery Alley (绣花巷) known locally as the Garden of the Lis (李家花园) because it was previously owned by the fifth son of Li Hongzhang, the famous statesman of the Qing dynasty. It consisted of "two large, rambling, Chinese mansions set side by side, each containing four paved courts, set one behind the other, with a fifth court at the side. The buildings were all of gray brick with gray tiles and overhanging caves. Each court had about ten rooms, in most of the rooms delicately latticed windows covered the larger half of the walls. Access to adjoining courts was through moon gates—larger circular openings in the dividing walls." American faculty members complained of the freezing days of winter, the moldy floors, and walls with cracks. Students also complained about ventilation, heating, and general lack of hygiene. Thurston points out that despite these shortcomings, there was still some beauty to be found, with a beautiful garden with a pavilion laying east of the house.

=== New Home ===
Since 1916, Thurston had been engaging in negotiations to buy land for a new site of Ginling. However, because it was difficult for women to purchase land at the time, John Leighton Stuart—the president of Nanking Theological Seminary—took over the task. In 1918, he had secured twenty-seven acres of land including eleven ponds, sixty corners, and more than a thousand graves for about US$13,000. Henry Murphy of Murphy & Dana, a New York architecture firm that had opened an office in Shanghai, was commissioned to design the buildings. He had also designed buildings for Yale-in-China and the Yenching University campus. Thurston insisted on integrating Chinese architectural elements into the new campus. The design for new buildings had a modified Chinese palace-style exterior, with overhanging curved roofs and pointed eaves. At the same time, it was equipped with modern Western conveniences. A big part of the funding came from Thurston's campaigns in America, especially from the "Seven Oriental Colleges for Women" campaign. Thurston asserted that "it was the cooperative, non-competitive promotion of projects that finally made it appeal to the women of America." The academic quadrangle opened on the east, looking directly toward Purple Mountain. The Social and Athletic Building stood on the west side of the quadrangle, the Recitation Building on the north side, and the Science Building on the south side. The Social and Athletic Building, a gift of the Smith College Alumnae, was considered the "best example up to that time of Chinese style in architecture adapted to modern uses." The new campus garnered attention from numerous local, national, and foreign celebrities, families and friends of the college, and students from all over the city. It soon became a landmark in Nanjing and a symbol of multifaceted significance for Ginling's different constituencies. Even though it increased institutional self-esteem, it also roused envy among outsiders. The new campus designed by an American architect and built with American funds caused a certain tension between Ginling and its Chinese observers from the outside. Some criticized Ginling students' extravagant lifestyles and even westernized mind-sets, which, they claimed, "disqualified Ginling students from being productive and patriotic members of modern China."

=== After the Japanese Occupation ===
During the three years that the Japanese took over the Nanjing campus in 1942, serious damages were done to the buildings. Walls were dirty and full of holes. All radiators and furnaces were gone, and so were most furniture, laboratory equipment, and library books. New alterations had been made: a new brick wall, a gatehouse complete with a prison cell, numerous wooden buildings, and military equipment were left behind by the Japanese soldiers. Dr. Davis S. Hsiung planned and supervised rehabilitation of the campus.

== Sister College ==
Smith College located in Northampton, MA was the sister college of Ginling College, officially recognized from 1921 to 1951. Smith's relationship with Ginling began in 1916. Through the enthusiasm of Smith alumnae Delia Leavens and Frederica Mead, both of whom had spent considerable time in China, the Smith College Association for Christian Work adopted Ginling as its foreign project.

Smith College provided both financial and academic support to Ginling College. There was a Ginling representative in every Smith club, and Smith alumnae contributed at least one-fourth of Ginling's operating budget for years. Their first campus contribution in 1916 amounted to $1,000 and was made annually until 1921, when it was raised to $2,500, due to increasing interest in Ginling. During the difficult period of war, the contribution reached $4,000 a year. The Smith Alumnae Committee for Ginling was started in 1923, and Smith alumnae donated $50,000 for the construction of a recreation building in Ginling. Annual contributions to the College gradually increased until it reached a maximum of $5,500 a year.

Many Smith graduates also served as faculty at Ginling. By 1942, fifteen Smith alumnae had taught at Ginling.

Smith raised almost $2,500 as a gift to Ginling to celebrate its twenty-fifth birthday in 1940, and this money was used for repairs after the war.

== Legacy ==
- Nanjing Normal University was founded on the campus of Ginling College in 1952.
- Jinling Girls' High School (金陵女子高級中學) in Taipei was founded by alumnae of Jinling Women's University in 1956.

== Works cited ==
- Feng, Jin (2010). The Making of a Family Saga: Ginling College. ISBN 9781438429120.
- Thurston, Matilda S. Calder; Chester, Ruth Miriam (1956). Ginling College.
- Vautrin, Minnie (2008). Terror in Minnie Vautrin's Nanjing: Diaries and Correspondence, 1937-38. University of Illinois Press. ISBN 9780252033322.
