= Nanjing Normal University =

Public university in Nanjing, Jiangsu, China

- 南京师范大学
- Former names: Sanjiang Normal School (Faculty of Education); National Nanjing Higher Normal School (Faculty of Education); College of Education, National Southeastern University; College of Education, National 4th Sun Yat-sen University; Teachers College, National Central University; Teachers College, Nanjing University; Nanjing Normal College (1952–1984)
- Motto: 正德厚生，笃学敏行
- Type: Public
- Established: Originated in 1902; 124 years ago and established as an independent school in 1952; 74 years ago
- President: Minqiang Hu
- Academic staff: 1,898
- Students: 30,933
- Undergraduates: 18,369
- Postgraduates: 12,564
- Doctoral students: 1,525
- Other students: 5,216 (continuing education)
- Location: Nanjing, Jiangsu, China; 32°03′22″N 118°45′52″E
- Campus: Urban
- Colours
- Mascot: NNU Lion
- Website: www.njnu.edu.cn

Nanjing Normal University (NJNU; Chinese: 南京师范大学; pinyin: Nánjīng Shīfàn Dàxué) is a provincial public university in Nanjing, Jiangsu, China. It is affiliated with the Province of Jiangsu, and co-sponsored by the Ministry of Education and the provincial government. The university is part of the Double First-Class Construction and Project 211.

Nanjing Normal University
- Simplified Chinese: 南京师范大学
- Traditional Chinese: 南京師範大學
Transcriptions
Standard Mandarin
- Hanyu Pinyin: Nánjīng Shīfàn Dàxué
- Wade–Giles: Nan-ching Shih-fan Ta-hsüeh
Yue: Cantonese
- Jyutping: Naam4ging1 Si1faan6 Daai6hok6

As of 2020, NNU has three campuses in Nanjing, namely Xianlin, Suiyuan, and Zijin. It consists of 28 colleges and schools with an enrollment of 18,369 undergraduates and 12,564 graduate students, including 1,525 doctoral candidates.

== History ==
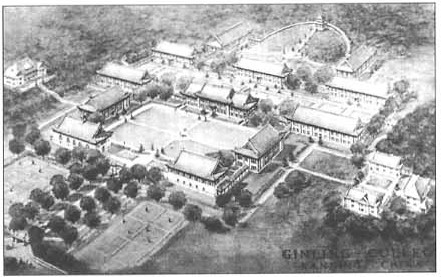
Bird's-eye view of Ginling College, one of the roots of NNU

The history of Nanjing Normal University can be traced to 1902 with the establishment of Sanjiang Normal School (三江师范学堂). Sanjiang refers to a historical province in Qing dynasty that roughly covers three provinces in contemporary China: Jiangsu, Jiangxi, and Anhui. The college evolved into Liangjiang Advanced Normal School, National Nanjing Higher Normal School, National Southeastern University, National 4th Sun Yat-sen University, National Jiangsu University, National Central University, and Nanjing University in the following decades.

The other origin of Nanjing Normal University is the University of Nanking which was established in 1888 as Nanking Academy and developed into Private University of Nanking in 1910. It was the first institution in China officially named "university" in English and was registered with the New York State Education Department. In 1951, Private University of Nanking and Private Ginling College, were integrated into the National University of Nanking.

In 1952, as a result of the nationwide reorganization of higher education, some schools and departments of Nanjing University and University of Nanking were separated and merged to establish Nanjing Normal College (南京师范学院), which was set up on the former site of Ginling College. The college then exchanged several academic faculties and departments with Soochow University (Suzhou) in Jiangsu Province, establishing a more robust discipline system for both institutions. In 1984, Nanjing Normal College was renamed Nanjing Normal University (南京师范大学). In 1996, it became one of the first group of universities designated by the Ministry of Education of China in the list of former Project 211 for National Key Universities. In 2000, Nanjing Polytechnic of Power Engineering, a national polytechnic institute governed by the Ministry of Chemical Industry at the time, was incorporated into the university. It is included in the Double First-Class Construction.

== Campus ==
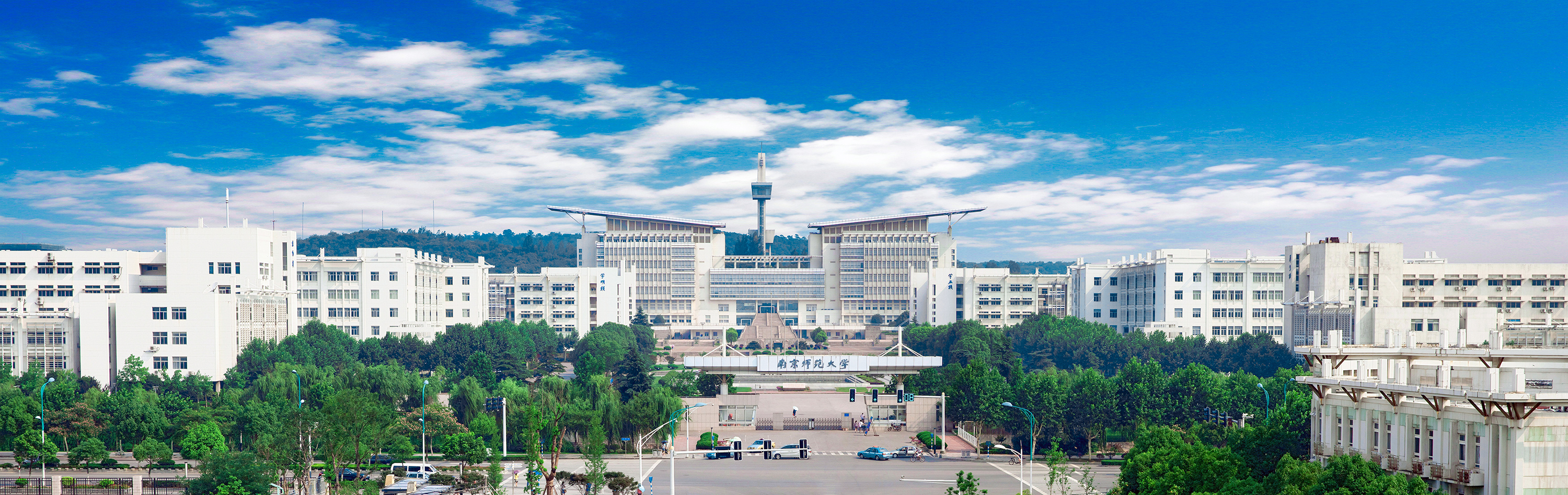
Panorama of NNU Xianlin Campus from the main gate

Nanjing Normal University has three campuses throughout the urban and suburban areas of Nanjing, China. Nanjing was named among the best student cities in the world for studying abroad by Quacquarelli Symonds in 2019. It is one of the Four Great Ancient Capitals of China and the current capital of Jiangsu Province.

=== Suiyuan (original campus) ===
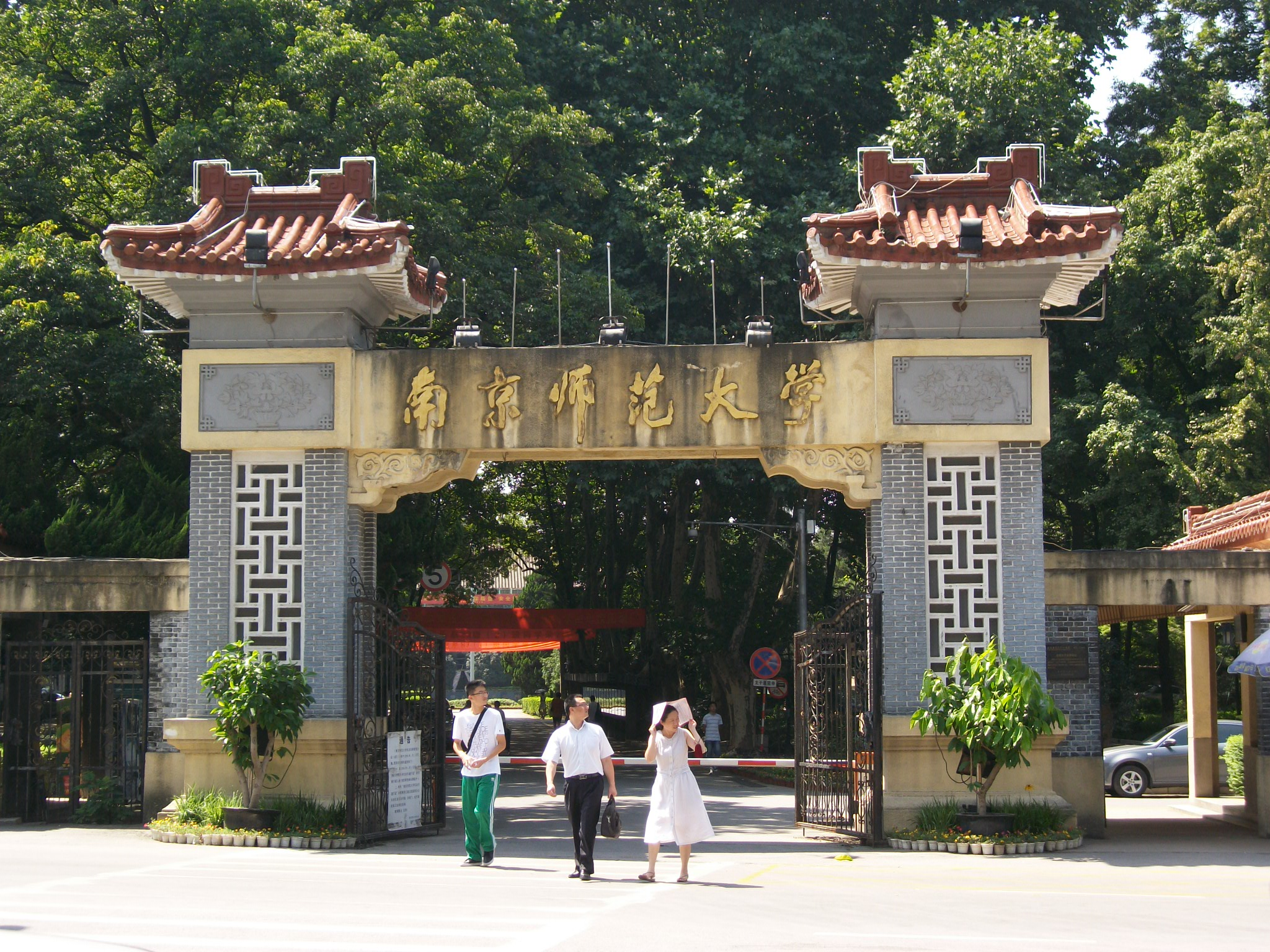
Main gate of NNU Suiyuan Campus in traditional style

Suiyuan Campus (随园校区) (122 Ninghai Rd, Gulou District) is the historical site of the former Ginling College and has been designated as a "Major Historical and Cultural Site Protected at the National Level" of China. It is home to a number of classical Chinese buildings.

=== Xianlin (Main Campus) ===
Xianlin Campus (仙林校区) (1 Wenyuan Rd, Qixia District), located in Xianlin University City, is the main campus of Nanjing Normal University. Established in 2001, it is the newest and largest campus. It occupies an area of 346.7 hectares and is divided into four parts, east, west, north and south, having the majority of undergraduate students study here. The main library in the center of the campus, subsidized by Zhu Jingwen, is the largest single building library in Jiangsu Province.

=== Zijin (Polytechinical Campus) ===
Zijin Campus (紫金校区) (78 Bancang St, Xuanwu District) is the site of the former Nanjing Polytechnic of Power Engineering, which merged into Nanjing Normal University in 2000. It was the home of NNU's School of Electrical and Automation Engineering and School of Energy and Mechanical Engineering, which moved to the expanded Xianlin Campus in 2019.

== Academics ==
Since it turned into an independent school from the teachers college of Nanjing University, Nanjing Normal University has become a research university for arts and sciences in China with a number of top-ranked subjects. According to the academic subjects evaluation held by the Ministry of Education in 2012, NNU ranked 3rd in education/pedagogy, 6th in geography, 6th in Marxism studies, 7th in foreign languages and literatures, 9th in psychology, 9th in fine arts, and 13th for law and legal studies.

=== Colleges and schools ===
As of 2020, there are 28 colleges and schools, including:

- Ginling College
- Honors College
- School of Teacher Education
- International College for Chinese Studies
- School of Public Administration
- School of Business
- School of Law
- School of Marxism
- School of Education Science
- School of Psychology
- School of Sports Science and Physical Education
- School of Chinese Language and Literature
- School of Foreign Languages and Cultures
- School of Journalism and Communication
- School of Social Development
  - Social Development Academy
- School of Mathematical Sciences
- School of Physics and Technology
- School of Chemistry and Materials Science
- School of Geography
- School of Life Sciences
- School of Energy and Mechanical Engineering
- School of Electrical Engineering and Automation
- School of Computer Science and Electronic Information/School of Artificial Intelligence
- School of Environment
- School of Marine Science and Engineering
- School of Food and Pharmaceutical Engineering
- School of Music
- School of Fine Art

=== Majors and programs ===
By 2020, Nanjing Normal University offers undergraduate degree programs in 74 majors, research master's degree programs in 41 disciplines, professional master's degree programs in 25 disciplines, and doctoral degree programs in 26 disciplines. It has also established 22 post-doctoral research centers.

As of 2020, NNU has 29 undergraduate programs that are officially designated by the Ministry of Education of China as "National First-class Undergraduate Programs", including:

School	Undergraduate Program
School of Public Administration	Philosophy
School of Public Administration	Public Administration
School of Business	Business Administration
School of Business	International Economics and Trade
School of Law	Law
School of Marxism	Ideological and Political Education
School of Education Science	Early Child Education
School of Education Science	Elementary Education
School of Education Science	Educational Technology
School of Psychology	Applied Psychology
School of Sports Science and Physical Education	Physical Education
School of Sports Science and Physical Education	Sports Management
School of Chinese Language and Literature	Chinese Language and Literature
School of Foreign Languages and Cultures	English
School of Foreign Languages and Cultures	Russian
School of Journalism and Communication	Journalism
School of Journalism and Communication	Broadcast and Television Directing
School of Mathematical Sciences	Mathematics and Applied Mathematics
School of Mathematical Sciences	Statistics
School of Physics and Technology	Physics
School of Chemistry and Materials Science	Chemistry
School of Geography	Geographic Information Science
School of Geography	Physical Geography and Environmental Resources
School of Geography	Tourism Management
School of Life Sciences	Biology
School of Electrical Engineering and Automation	Electrical Engineering and Automation
School of Computer Science	Computer Science and Engineering
School of Music	Musicology
School of Fine Art	Fine Art
School of Fine Art	Chinese Painting

=== Research ===
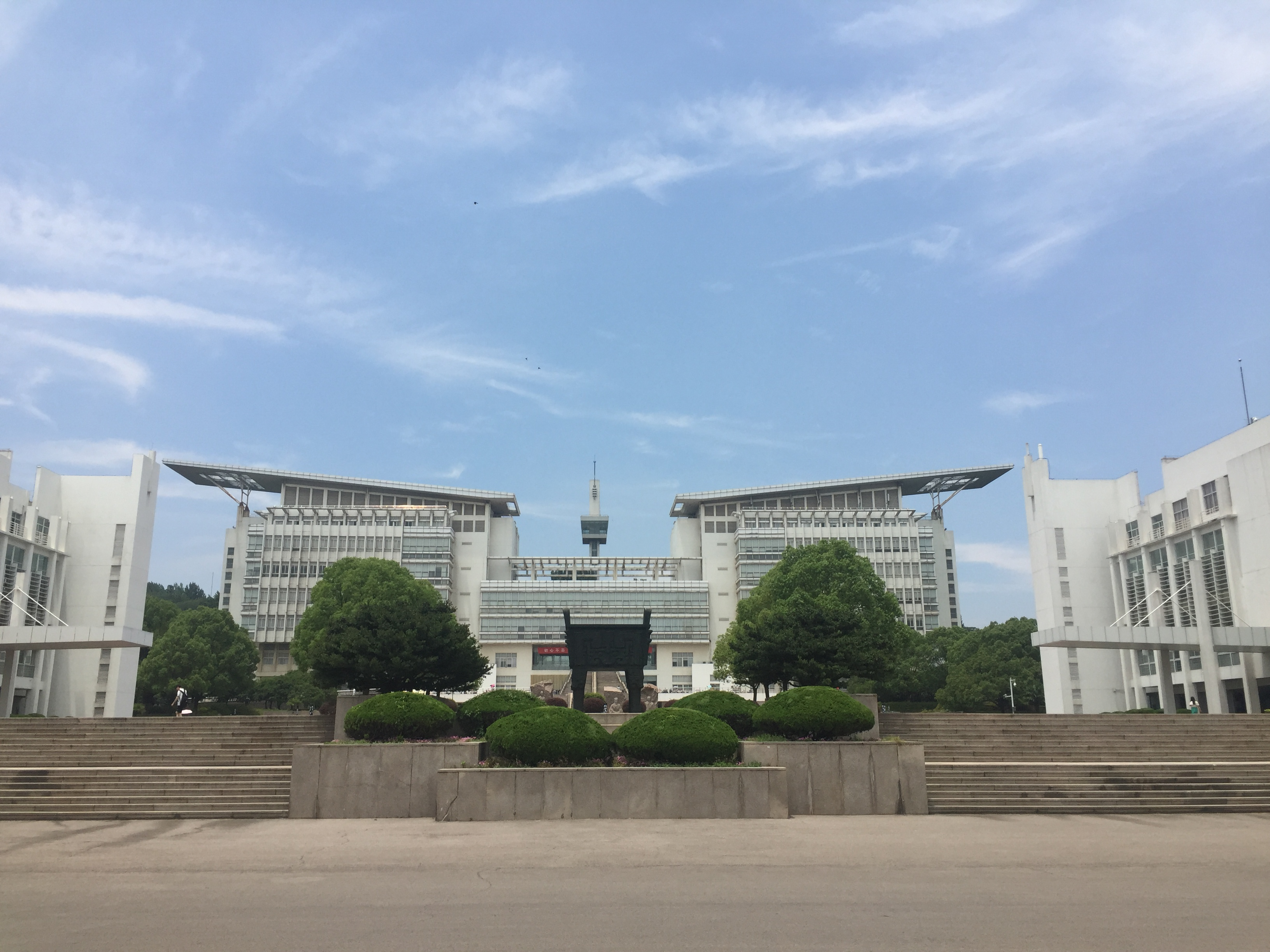
Jingwen Library, the main library of NNU located on central Xianlin Campus

In recent years, NNU has achieved 32 Key Projects from the National Social Science Fund of China, 7 Philosophy and Social Sciences Key Research Projects from the Ministry of Education, 2 National Science and Technology Support Projects, 4 projects funded by the 973 Program (National Basic Research Program), 1 project funded by the 863 Program (State High-Tech Development Plan), and 28 Key Projects from the National Natural Science Foundation of China.

NNU has signed a cooperative agreement with the Nanjing Branch of the Chinese Academy of Sciences (CAS) and the Purple Mountain Observatory, CAS to strengthen cooperation in the frontiers of earth and space science, exchange of faculty and personnel, and joint training of graduate students. On July 4, 2021, the asteroid number 216446, discovered by the Purple Mountain Observatory, was named "NNU Star" with the approval of the Small Bodies Naming Committee of the International Astronomical Union (IAU).

=== Rankings ===
The 2023 Academic Ranking of World Universities (ARWU) ranked Nanjing Normal University within the range of 401–500 globally.

University rankings

Global – Overall
- ARWU World: 401-500 (2023)
- CWUR World: 558 (2023)
- CWTS World: 412 (2023)
- QS World: 951-1000 (2026)
- THE World: 801–1000 (2024)

Regional – Overall
- QS Asia: =248 (2025)
- THE Asia: 194 (2021)

National – Overall
- BCUR National: 47 (2021)
- CUAA National: 41 (2021)
- Wu Shulian National: 56 (2021)

The 2021 Chinese University Ranking (CUAA) ranked the university 41st comprehensively and 20th for humanities and social sciences, right behind such schools as Shanghai Jiao Tong University (18th) and China University of Political Science and Law (19th) and ahead of such schools as Zhongnan University of Economics and Law (21st), Jinan University (23rd) and Xi'an Jiaotong University (26th).

By September 2021, NNU has been listed among the world's top 1% in 10 academic disciplines by ESI, one of the world's most influential indicators of academic capacity. The 10 disciplines include:

- Chemistry (top 0.28%)
- Engineering (top 0.29%)
- Agricultural Sciences (top 0.45%)
- Materials Science (top 0.48%)
- Environment/Ecology (top 0.54%)
- Plant & Animal Science (top 0.61%)
- Geosciences (top 0.70%)
- Mathematics (top 0.78%)
- Social Sciences, General (top 0.88%)
- Computer Science (top 0.99%)

ARWU subject and major rankings
Applied Statistics	17
Artificial Intelligence	47
Biology	20
Business Administration	44
Chemistry	30
Chinese Language and Literature	16
Computer Science and Engineering	65
Drama and Film Studies	7
Early Childhood Education	3
Economics	52
Education	6
Educational Technology	5
Electrical Engineering and Automation	59
Elementary Education	1
Financial Mathematics	9
Fine Arts	7
Foreign Languages and Literatures	12
Geographical Science	5
Information and Computational Science	39
Journalism and Communication	13
Law	16
Mathematics	36
Musicology	20
Physics	28
Political Science	25
Psychology	6
Social Work	27
Sports Management	8
Urban and Rural Planning	7

=== Joint programs (selected) ===
- Dual Bachelor's Program in Accounting/Finance with Macquarie University (Australia)
- Dual Bachelor's Program in Computer Science with the University of Queensland (Australia)
- Dual Bachelor's Program in Education with Tohoku University (Japan)
- Dual Bachelor's Program in Education with the University of Strathclyde (UK)
- Dual Bachelor's Program in Electrical Engineering with Northumbria University (UK)
- Dual Bachelor's Program in Law with Hokkaido University (Japan)
- Dual Bachelor's Program in Public Administration with George Mason University (US)
- Dual Master's Program in Criminal Justice with the University of Maryland, College Park (US)
- Dual Master's Program in Applied Geoinformatics with the University of Salzburg (Austria)
- Dual Master's Program in Geographic Information Science with the University of Maryland, College Park (US)
- Fifth Year Master of Laws (L.L.M.) Program with the University of California, Riverside (US)
- Fifth Year Master of Laws (L.L.M.) Program with Swansea University (UK)

=== Partner universities (selected) ===
Country/Region	Institutions
United States	California State University; George Mason University; George Washington University; Illinois Institute of Technology; North Carolina State University; Northern Arizona University; Pace University; Salem State University; Smith College; Stanford University; University of Arizona; University of California; University of Central Florida; University of Maryland; University of Wisconsin
United Kingdom	Newcastle University; Northumbria University; Queen Mary University of London; Swansea University; University of Essex; University of Glasgow; University of Portsmouth; University of Stirling; University of Strathclyde; University of York
Canada	Concordia University; University of Calgary; University of Toronto; University of Western Ontario; York University
Australia	La Trobe University; Macquarie University; Monash University; Queensland University of Technology; University of New South Wales; University of Western Australia
France	École des mines d'Alès; ESC Rennes School of Business; ESCE International Business School; University of Bordeaux
Germany	Heidelberg University; University of Cologne; University of Freiburg; University of Wuerzburg
Japan	Aichi University of Education; Hokkaido University; International Christian University; Keio University; Kumamoto University; Meiji University; Nanzan University; Ritsumeikan Asia Pacific University; Ritsumeikan University; Sapporo Gakuin University; Tohoku University; Tokyo Gakugei University
South Korea	Chung-Ang University; Ewha Womans University; Jeonbuk National University; Keimyung University; Korea University; Kyungpook University; Pukyong National University; Yonsei University
Hong Kong, China	open: Lingnan University; Hong Kong Baptist University; The Education University of Hong Kong
Taiwan, China	Fu Jen Catholic University; Shih Hsin University; Soochow University (Taiwan); Taiwan Normal University

== Student Life ==
=== Organizations ===
There are 180 recognized student organizations and clubs on campus. Students can create new organizations to satisfy their own interests and likeminded other students. With the consent from related departments and the approval of the NNU Party Committee, students are also allowed to establish organizations which off-campus students can get involved. Staff members in the Youth League Committee are available. They will connect students with existing recognized student organizations and give advices to start new ones.

==== Registered student organizations (selected) ====
Astronomy Club: a university-level academic club. The astronomy club was founded in September, 2009. Since then, the club has been constantly improving its observation equipments, increasing the number of club members, encouraging participation in various activities, and widening its social influence. The club owns 5 astronomical telescopes, including a reflective astronomical telescope, a refractive and reflective astronomical telescope, and three refractive astronomical telescopes. G-Mix Dancing Club: In October 1999, a group of NNU women founded a school dancing association named G-Mix. The club aims at improving college students' artistic accomplishment. Members dance together at least three times a week. G-Mix also invites professional teachers to give lessons every semester. Guangyu Chinese Opera Club: Guangyu Chinese Opera Club was founded in September 2003. It is a club of various kinds of Chinese operas, such as Beijing Opera, Kun Opera, Yue Opera, Huangmei Opera, Yu Opera. The club holds regular activities every week. Students practice singing on weekdays, train performing on Saturdays, and watch different types of operas on Sundays. There are lectures on Chinese opera every semester as well. The club aims at inheriting and carrying forward the culture of Chinese opera and meanwhile adding varieties to campus activities. HOLA Ballroom Dance Club: HOLA Ballroom Dance Club is a NNU student group focused on social dancing. Founded in 2015 by a group of dance lovers, the club teaches novice and veteran dancers a variety of Latin dances and Ballroom, and takes part in dance events, performances and competitions. The club mainly offers lessons on the International Latin (Cha-Cha, Rumba, Samba, Paso Doble, Jive). Classes are divided into two levels: Beginner and Intermediate, therefore no former experience is required. Team members train weekly to prepare for competitions and performances held in the university and across Nanjing.

=== Athletics ===
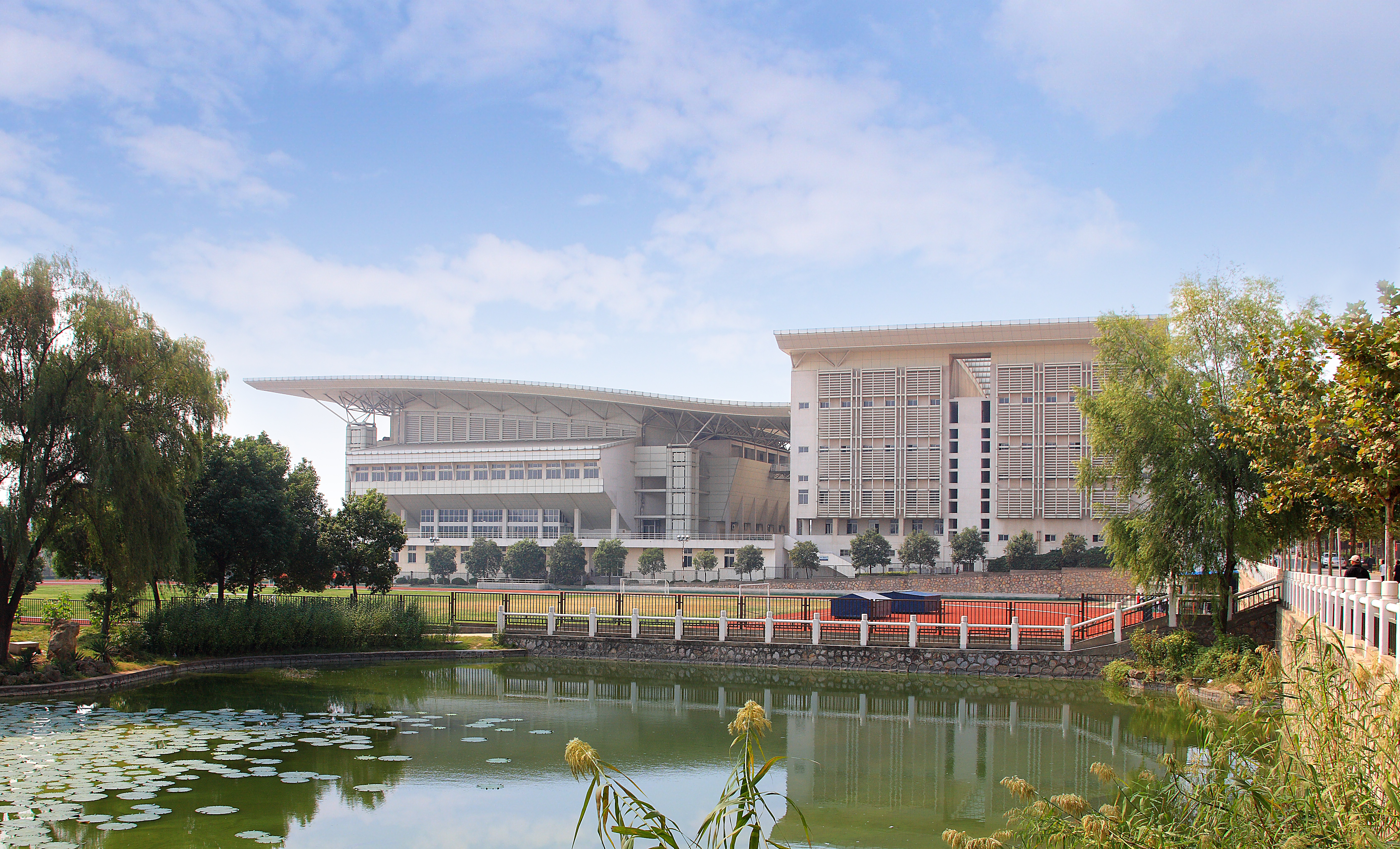
Sports center on west Xianlin Campus

Equipped with many complete sets of advanced facilities for exercising, the Xianlin Sports Center covers an area of 23,000 square meters falling in a convenient range for people to reach with six public bus driving directly to the destination and Metro Line 2 a few miles ahead. The Sports Center consists of two gyms, which are designed as the competition venue A with Yoga room, dancing room, VIP fitness center and shower room, and the comprehensive training gym B with warm-watered natatorium, badminton stadium, basketball arena, volleyball arena, table tennis training hall, exercising instrument room for masculine building, room for martial arts training, gymnastic hall, indoor plastic racetrack and two outdoor swimming pools. Many national-leveled and international-leveled sports competitions and artistic performance have been held in the center. In respond to the National Fitness Program, all the exercising rooms are now available to the citizens in Nanjing after the successful holding of the Tenth National Games. Except for the moment of physical teaching and training period, everyone is welcomed to the center to enjoy the shared resources for exercising.

Students and others exercise in the Suiyuan sports center after class and on holidays. To meet with the public demand for fitness training and physical recreation, School of Sports Science and Physical Education in NNU has established many training programs open to the public to enhance the social interaction and ease the contradictions caused by the unbalanced distribution of the training zones in the gym. Providing the access to the Sports Center in Suiyuan campus, Nanjing Normal University has acted as an ideal place for public exercising and arena for sports competition. There are three gyms now available to the public: the badminton hall, table tennis arena and basketball arena.

== Notable alumni ==
- Tao Xingzhi, one of the most celebrated educators in Chinese history
- Zhang Daqian, one of the most famous Chinese artists of the 20th century
- Wu Yi-fang, a prominent Chinese diplomat in the United States and one of only four women to sign the UN Charter in 1945
- Zheng Xiaoying, the first woman conductor in China and the chief conductor of the China National Opera House
- Chen Heqin (陈鹤琴), famous child educator, child psychologist, professor, the founder of China's modern early childhood education
- Qian Ji, a profound physicist and aerospace engineer awarded the Two Bombs, One Satellite Meritorious Medal for his contribution in the development of China's first satellite
- Hong Yinxing (洪银兴), a prominent economist who served as the Chancellor of Nanjing University and the Vice-Chair of the Social Science Commission of the Ministry of Education
- Li Jiange (李剑阁), president of China International Capital Corporation and former deputy director of the Economics Restructuring Office of the State Council
- Liu Mingkang, former chairman of China Banking Regulatory Commission, former president of the Bank of China and China Everbright Group
- Cai Mingzhao, president of Xinhua News Agency, director of the State Council Information Office, member of the 19th Central Committee of the Chinese Communist Party,
- Huang Ming, minister of the Ministry of Emergency Management and former deputy minister of the Ministry of Public Security (China)
- Le Yucheng, executive vice minister of the Ministry of Foreign Affairs, alternate member of the 19th Central Committee of the Chinese Communist Party
- Zhu Chengshan (朱成山), curator of the Memorial Hall of the Victims in Nanjing Massacre by Japanese Invaders, a prominent scholar of Chinese history and peace-building
- Yang Jinlong, chemist, Academician of the Chinese Academy of Sciences (CAS), vice president of the University of Science and Technology of China
- Zhang Jindong, a Chinese billionaire entrepreneur, founder and the current largest shareholder of Suning
- Fan Hongwei, a Chinese billionaire entrepreneur, CEO of the chemical fiber company Hengli Petrochemical Co., Ltd.
- Wu Weishan, curator of the National Art Museum of China and president of the Chinese Academy of Sculpture
- Meng Fei, a household name in China that serves as a host for several nationwide TV programs
- Hui Ruoqi, the Outside Hitter and the fifteenth Captain of China Women's National Volleyball Team which won the gold medal at the 2016 Summer Olympics
- Zhang Changning, the Outside Hitter of China Women's National Volleyball Team and won the gold medal at the 2016 Summer Olympics
- Michael Anti, a Chinese journalist and political blogger, recognized for his posts about freedom of the press in China
- Zee Yuh-tsung, Chinese diplomat
- Zhang Linghe, Chinese Actor

== See also ==
- Yangtze High School
