= Nanjing University of Posts and Telecommunications =

Provincial public university in Nanjing, Jiangsu, China

Coordinates: 32.0805°N 118.7650°E

- 南京邮电大学
- Former names: Nanjing Institute of Posts and Telecommunications
- Motto: 厚德 弘毅 求是 笃行
- Type: Public
- Established: 1942; 84 years ago
- President: Ye Meilan
- Academic staff: 2,280 (fall 2014)
- Students: about 30,000 (fall 2014)
- Undergraduates: 19,454 (fall 2014)
- Postgraduates: 2,281
- Location: Nanjing, Jiangsu, China
- Campus: Xianlin, Sanpailou, Suojincun and Jiangning
- Website: njupt.edu.cn

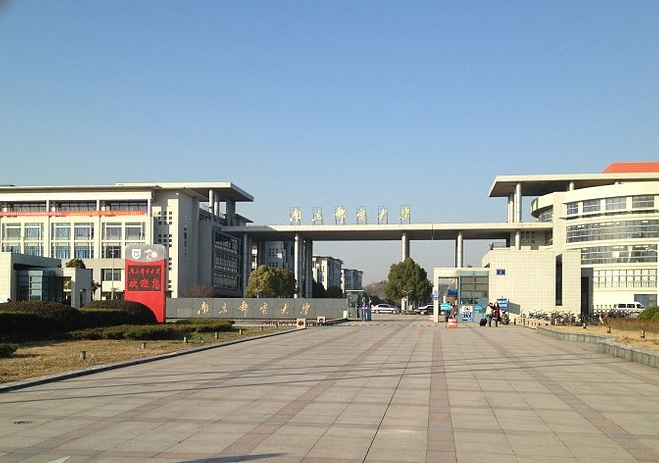
Nanjing University of Posts and Telecommunications

The Nanjing University of Posts and Telecommunications (NJUPT; 南京邮电大学) is a provincial public university in Nanjing, Jiangsu, China. It is affiliated with the Province of Jiangsu. The university is part of the Double First-Class Construction.

== History ==
Established in 1958, the history of the Nanjing University of Posts and Telecommunications can be traced to the training class for the cadres of the General Postal Administrations during the wartime in 1942. Thereafter, it underwent a series of name and structural changes, including the Posts and Telecommunications Training Department of Shandong University (山东大学邮电专科部) and Shandong Postal School (山东邮政专科学校). Zhao Zhigang, Chief of the then Wartime General Postal Administration, served concurrently as the head teacher of the training class and the principal of the school in succession during the period from 1942 to 1947. In 1948, the school was formally named the East China Posts and Telecommunications School at Yidu (now called Qingzhou), affiliated to the East China General Administration of Posts and Telecommunications. It then moved from Jinan, Shandong to Nanjing, Jiangsu in August 1949.

In December 1950, it was chronologically enlarged into the Nanjing School of Posts and Telecommunications under the direct control of the Ministry of Posts and Telecommunications, the East China School of Posts and Telecommunications, the Nanjing Institute of Posts and Telecommunications, and the Nanjing University of Posts and Telecommunications. After the reform of the leadership system of national universities in February 2000, the Nanjing University of Posts and Telecommunications started to be jointly administered by both the central and the provincial government, with the provincial government playing the principle role. In March 2013, the university merged with the Nanjing College for Population Management (南京人口管理干部学院).

== Academics ==
=== Schools and departments ===
The Nanjing University of Posts and Telecommunications consists of 16 schools and departments, including:

- School of Communication and Information Engineering
- School of Electronic Science & Engineering
- School of Opto-Electronic Engineering
- School of Computer Science & Technology
- School of Software (Compus Net and Computer Centre)
- School of Automation
- School of Materials Science & Engineering
- School of Natural Sciences
- School of Geography and Biological Information
- School of Media and Arts
- School of Economics and Management
- School of Humanities and Social Science
- School of Foreign Languages
- School of Oversea Education
- Department of Physical Education
- School of Continuing Education (School of Applied Technology)

=== Rankings ===
University rankings

Global – Overall
- ARWU World: 601–700 (2021)

National – Overall
- BCUR National: 95 (2021)
- CUAA National: 137 (2021)

NJUPT is a leading institution in many engineering subjects, such as telecommunications, transportations, electronics, and cybersecurity. Its highest national rank reached 76th in 2019 by the Shanghai Ranking.

ARWU subject and major rankings
| Applied Statistics | 40 |
| Biomedical Engineering | 50 |
| Broadcast and Television Engineering | 1 |
| Computer Science and Engineering | 44 |
| Cyberspace Security | 19 |
| Data Science and Big Data Technology | 40 |
| Digital Media Technology | 15 |
| Electronic Information Engineering | 15 |
| Electronic Science and Technology | 20 |
| Financial Engineering | 58 |
| Intelligence Science and Technology | 25 |
| Management Science and Engineering | 67 |
| Microelectronics Science and Engineering | 22 |
| Network Engineering | 9 |
| Optical Engineering | 21 |
| Polymer Materials Engineering | 36 |
| Signalling Control | 7 |
| Social Work | 26 |
| Software Engineering | 24 |
| Telecommunications Engineering and Management | 2 |
| Urban and Rural Planning | 38 |
