= Yang Jinlong (chemist) =

Chinese chemist (born 1966)

- 杨金龙
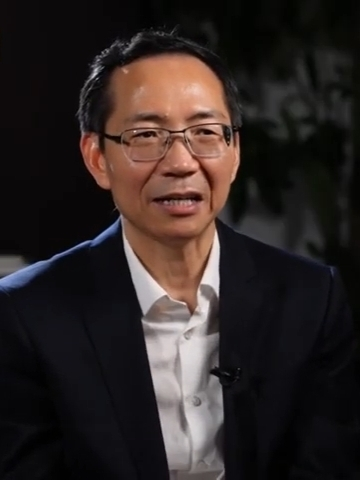
- Yang in 2023
- Born: January 1966 (age 60); Yancheng, Jiangsu, China
- Education: Nanjing Normal University; University of Science and Technology of China
- Political party: Chinese Peasants' and Workers' Democratic Party
- Scientific career
- Fields: Chemical physics Quantum chemistry Computational condensed matter physics
- Workplaces: University of Science and Technology of China

Chinese name
- Traditional Chinese: 楊金龍
- Simplified Chinese: 杨金龙
Transcriptions
Standard Mandarin
- Hanyu Pinyin: Yáng Jīnlóng

Yang Jinlong (Chinese: 杨金龙; born January 1966) is a Chinese chemist currently serving as vice president of the University of Science and Technology of China.

== Biography ==
Yang was born in the town of Xuefu, Yandu District of Yancheng, Jiangsu in January 1966. In 1981 he entered Nanjing Normal University, where he graduated in 1985. From 1985 to 1991, he studied at the University of Science and Technology of China (USTC), where he earned his master's and Ph.D. degrees.

Upon graduation, he joined the faculty of USTC. In 1996 he was promoted to professor. He became Dean of the School of Chemistry and Materials Science of USTC in 2009 and Vice President of USTC in May 2018.

== Honours and awards ==
- November 22, 2019 Member of the Chinese Academy of Sciences (CAS)
