= Frederica Mead Hiltner =

American missionary educator

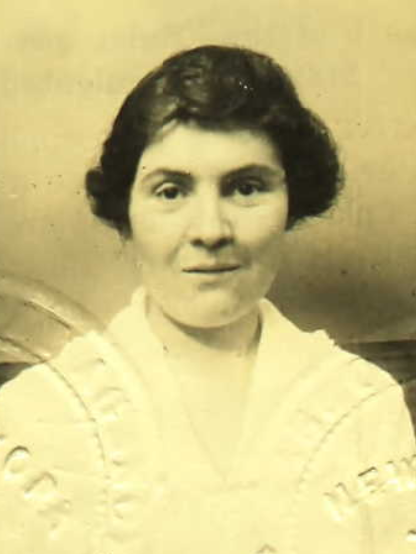
- Frederica Mead (later Hiltner), from her 1918 passport application
- Born: Frederica Rutherford Mead; June 15, 1890; Plainfield, New Jersey, U.S.
- Died: May 29, 1977 (aged 86); Seattle, Washington, U.S.
- Occupation(s): Educator, Presbyterian missionary
- Relatives: William Rutherford Mead (uncle); Larkin Goldsmith Mead (uncle); Lawrence Mead (grand-nephew)

Frederica Rutherford Mead Hiltner (June 15, 1890 – May 29, 1977) was an American educator and Presbyterian missionary in China.

== Early life and education ==
Mead was born in Plainfield, New Jersey, the daughter of Frederick Goodhue Mead and Marie Louise Myers Mead. Her father died before she was born. Architect William Rutherford Mead and sculptor Larkin Goldsmith Mead were her uncles. Her older brother Lawrence Myers Mead taught and worked in China for the YMCA.

Her older sister Margaret Platt Mead (not the anthropologist of similar name) was a national and international leader of the YWCA. She graduated from Smith College in 1911, and earned a joint master's degree in English and Religious Education from Teachers College, Columbia University and Union Theological Seminary in 1918.

== Career ==
Mead was a Presbyterian missionary teacher, and the first Smith alumna on the faculty at Ginling College in Nanking. She taught from 1915 to 1922, with a furlough from 1916 to 1918 to attend graduate school in New York City. During World War I, she was a member of the Junior War Work Council of the YWCA. She spoke about her work to community groups in New Jersey in 1916 and in 1922.

Hiltner was active in the YWCA in Seattle. She was president of Christian Friends for Racial Equality, a Seattle civil rights organization, in the 1950s. She volunteered with the Omi Brotherhood, an interdenominational Christian lay organization, and edited a collection of poems, Poems of East and West (1960) by the Omi Brotherhood founder, Merrell Vories.

== Publications ==
- "China's First Union College for Women" (1915)
- Poems of East and West (1960, editor)

== Personal life ==
Mead married widowed medical missionary Walter Garfield Hiltner in 1923. The couple returned to the United States from China in 1925, soon after their son Frederick died in infancy; they lived in Seattle, where their son John was born in 1926. Her husband was medical director of an insurance company in Seattle, and he died in 1951. She died in 1977, at the age of 86, in Seattle.
