= Zhu Jingwen =

Zhu Jingwen (Chinese: 朱景文; pinyin: Zhū Jǐngwén, born January 7, 1948) is a Chinese legal scholar who serves as Professor of Legal Theory at the Renmin University of China Law School, Board Member of the China Law Society, and Director of the Renmin University of China Center on Law and Globalization.

== Biography ==
Zhu Jingwen was born to a Han family in Beijing, China. A member of the first class of graduate students to attend Renmin University after the reinstatement of the National Higher Education Entrance Examination, Zhu received his LL.M degree from Renmin University of China Law School in 1982, after which he joined the school's faculty. From 1987 to 1988, he was a visiting scholar at the University of Hawaii William S. Richardson School of Law. From 1996 to 1997, he was a Fulbright Scholar at the University of Wisconsin Law School. In 2005, he was elected as one of Distinguished Contemporary Chinese Jurists.

Among Zhu's numerous published works is the textbook Legal Theory, co-authored with Shen Zongling and other prominent jurists. In 1997, the textbook received a First Prize for Textbook Achievement from the Chinese government. In 2008, the textbook was once again recognized for excellence by the Department of Education.
