= Wu Yi-fang =

Chinese head of university (1893–1985)

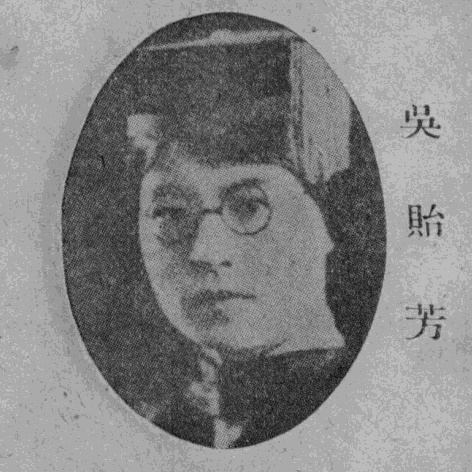
- Born: 吳貽芳; January 26, 1893; Wuchang City, Hubei Province, China
- Died: November 10, 1985 (aged 92); Nanjing, China
- Citizenship: Chinese

Academic background
- Education: Ginling College (UG); University of Michigan (MA, PhD)

Academic work
- Discipline: Educator and Diplomat

Wu Yi-fang
- Traditional Chinese: 吳貽芳
- Simplified Chinese: 吴贻芳
Transcriptions
Standard Mandarin
- Hanyu Pinyin: Wú Yí Fāng
- Wade–Giles: Wu I-fang

Wu Yi-fang (Wu I-fang, 1893–1985) was a prominent Chinese figure who is best known for her role as president of Ginling College and as the first and one of only four women to sign the UN Charter in 1945. Wu came from a well-educated family and throughout her life attended numerous schools in both China and America, which played a large role in her advocacy for women's education in China. This advocacy was most persistent and prominent in her role as president of Ginling College where she was able to actively integrate the educational policies she believed in.

Wu was also a significant Chinese diplomat abroad, especially in America, where she attained her MA and PhD in biology. The connections she made during her time at the University of Michigan through her leadership roles in student organizations enabled her to bridge the gap between Chinese and American networks with regard to education. Her role as a Chinese diplomat was most evident when in 1945 she was sent as the only woman part of the Chinese Delegation at the San Francisco Conference.

Wu Yi-fang is remembered as a dedicated president and diplomat, who consistently pursued greater access to education for women in China and abroad.

== Early life and education ==
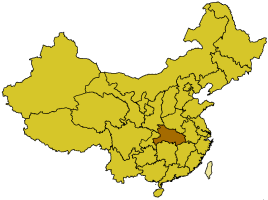
Hubei Province, China, where Yi-fang was born.

Wu Yi-fang was born the youngest of three children in Wuchang city, located in the Hubei Province in China. As she was born in the winter, her father, Wu Shou-xun (吴守训)) nicknamed her “冬生”, which translates as “Winter Born”. Wu came from a well-educated family: her grandfather was a magistrate in Jingzhou, Hubei, her father served as the director of Yali Bureau in Hubei, as well as a magistrate of Dangyang County, and her uncle was a famous scholar in Hangzhou. Wu was educated from a young age, studying at home with her brother at the age of seven, then attending Hangzhou's Hongdao Girls' School, Shanghai's Qiming Girls' School, and Suzhou's Jinghai Girls' School with her sister. As she frequently changed schools and moved cities, her experiences fuelled her curiosity about the world outside her home. With a scholarly family background, Wu was encouraged to bind her feet, like her mother had done in her youth. She would later realize she could not continue to pursue education with bound feet and began unbinding and lengthening her feet.

In 1909, Wu's father was framed by his boss for “embezzling public funds”. In distress over the lost funds, he committed suicide by throwing himself into a river. Wu Yi-fang left her school, and the following year, she and her family moved to her mother's hometown in Hangzhou, relying on relatives to support them. After a year, they moved again to Shanghai with Wu's uncle, Chen Shu-tong (陈叔通) and his family. On October 10, 1911, the XinHai Revolution broke out. Without hope of emigrating out of the country to escape the many uprisings and revolts at the time, her brother, Wu Yi-chu (吴贻榘) committed suicide by jumping into a river. Exacerbated by the deaths of her husband and her son, Wu's mother, who had fallen ill, died shortly after. The night before her mother's funeral, Wu's sister, Wu Yi-fen (吴贻芬) hung herself in despair. At the age of 19, Wu's brother, mother, and sister had died, all within a month.

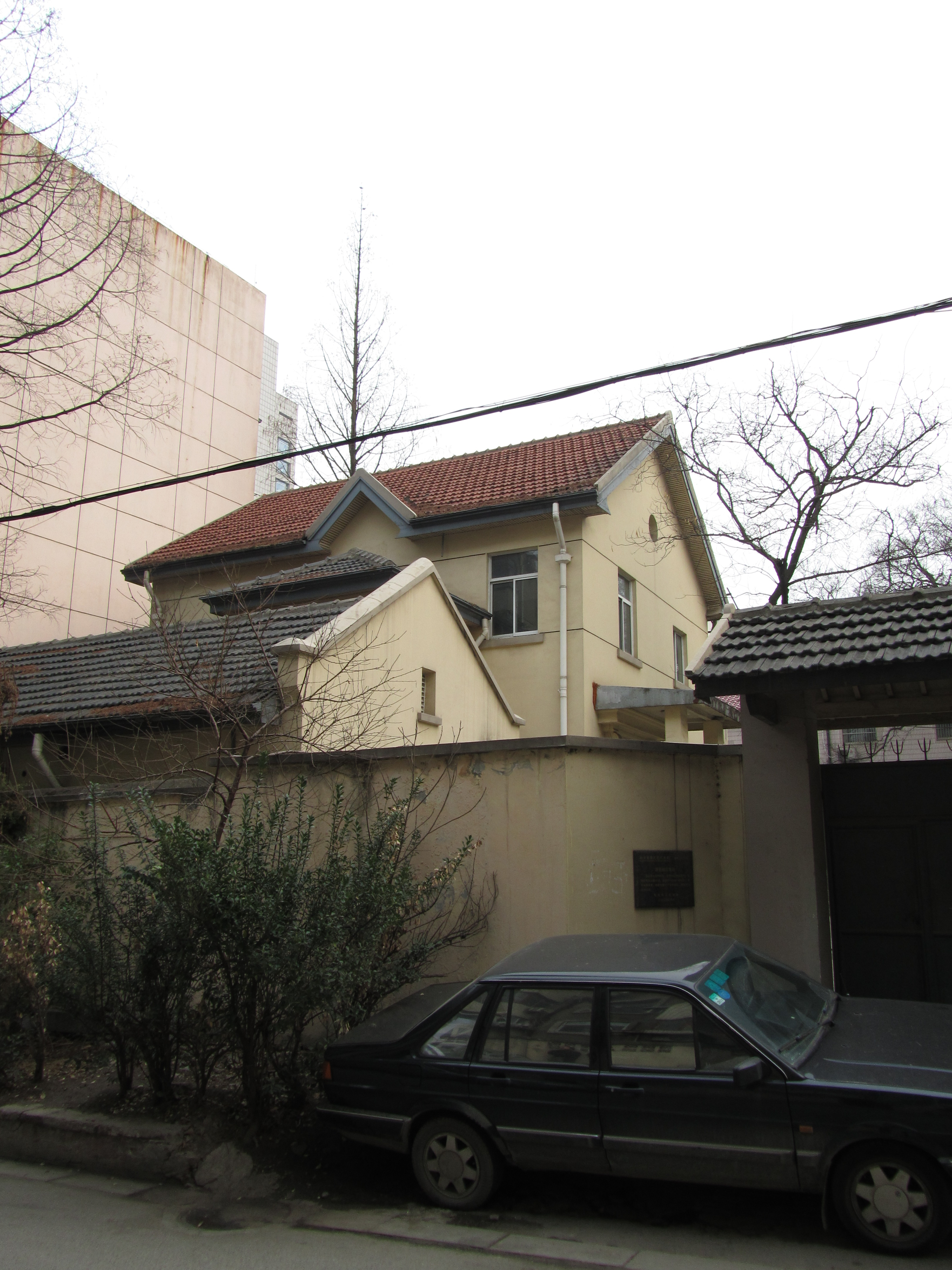
Former residence of Wu Yi-fang in Nanjing.

Wu Yi-fang went to live with her uncle in Hangzhou, where she continued her studies at Hongdao Girls' School. A few years later, with her uncle's recommendation, she taught English at Beijing Women's Higher Normal School. She moved back to Shanghai in 1915, where she received a letter from Mary A. Nourse, an American professor at Ginling College, inviting her to study at the university. At Ginling College, in addition to being elected president of the first student self-government association, Wu led over 50 students to support the 1919 Beijing May 4 Movement. She was also introduced to Christianity by her classmate, Xu Yi-Zhen, and was baptized in 1918. On June 25, 1919, Wu Yi-fang was one of five graduates in the college's first graduation class and became one of the first female college students in China to obtain a bachelor's degree.

Following her graduation, Wu began teaching at the Beijing Women's Higher Normal School, where she served as the director of the English Department. During this time, Mary Wooley, President of Mount Holyoke College visited the school. Impressed by Wu's work, Wooley recommended Wu for a Barbour Scholarship to the University of Michigan. In 1922, Wu Yi-fang attended the University of Michigan to study biology. In America, Wu served as president of the North American Chinese Christian Student Association, vice president of the Chinese Students Association in the US, and president of the Chinese Student Union of the University of Michigan. Wu earned her master's degree in 1924, and her doctoral degree in 1928, writing her dissertation on The Life History of the Black Fly (黒蝇生活史),.

== Career ==
=== Academic ===
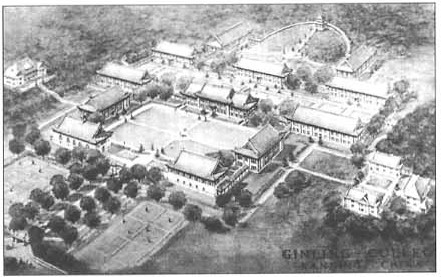
Ginling College

Wu Yi-fang was the president of Ginling Women's College from 1928 to 1951. In 1928, Wu – a first class graduate from Ginling Women's College and had completed her Ph.D. at the University of Michigan – returned to China and accepted the position of president. Wu was the first Chinese woman to head a college, and often seen as one of the few female leaders in a male-dominated administrative body, Wu accomplished bold reforms in teaching and educational policies.

Wu faced her first critical moment when a general wanted to occupy the headquarters temporarily for the warlord Yan Xishan. Through a reliable network of connections, she was able to reach out to the first college student, Y.T. Zee to arrange a conversation with the foreign minister. Although Ginling College was run as with a Christian background, the rise of Chinese nationalism and sinification led Wu to reframe the colleges’ vision. With the nationalist government, educational institutions could not be utilized to propagate religion. Hence, after meeting with the Ministry of Education in April 1929, Wu wanted to maintain the Christian spirit but the officials declined her proposition. After two years of working on officially registering Ginling as a national educational institution, she was able to register it as a college (xueyuan), however, not as a university (daxue) since it did not reach the amount of departments needed for the government standards.

With a focus on the advancement of education, she readjusted teaching plans to reflect a modernized view. Only core majors were kept such as Chinese, English, History, Geography, Chemistry, Biology, Sociology, Music and PE. To improve the academic standard and scientific research capacities, famous scholars, professors and highly trained experts were asked to work at the college. They also strived for a comprehensive educated that valued the integration of Chinese and western culture and built holistic knowledge. With the college's expansion and increase of sinification, Wu ensured a stable position in Christian, feminist and government-associated organizations in China.

=== Political ===
Wu Yi-fang began her political career in 1938 when she was chosen for the People's Political Council (PPC) in place of the Chinese Communist Party (CCP) delegation who declined to participate. Wu had a remarkable ability to remain composed in heated arguments and oftentimes effectively served as an arbiter between rivals. In her position, Wu sought to uphold and establish democratic values in China and often warned of the dangers of a political system which appoints its own representative, such as the CCP that was beginning to gain popularity in China in the late 1930s.

After the Japanese surrender and subsequent retreat from Chinese territory, Wu Yi-fang became concerned with the growing “communist problem” within China. As a lifelong advocate for the benefits of an efficient democratic government, Wu viewed the CCP as yet another group seeking to consolidate power and believed that both the CCP and the Chiang governments were driven by their self-interests and would not be able to work together for betterment of the Chinese nation. Wu had also become quite critical of corruption and inefficiency within Chiang Kai-Shek's government. Wu believed that the communists were not successful at achieving support due to their ideology but rather due to the “continual poverty and skillful (use of) propaganda”. Although a prominent figure within the Chinese democracy, Wu's advice and calls for democratic change and reform were continuously ignored by Chaing Kai-Shek. As the communist victory over Chaing Kai-Shek became evident in 1949, Wu remained hopeful, hope which grounded in Chinese tradition and an effective education system. After the communist victory, Wu began to support that new government and changed her criticisms of the Communists to positivity, based on its ability to efficiently organize people and institutions. Wu began to take on an active role in the communist government and joined several committees such as the Nanjing Peoples Representatives in order to ensure that her advocacy for education continued to be heard.

=== San Francisco Conference ===
Wu Yi-fang was one of only four women to sign the UN Charter.

Wu Yi-fang is best remembered for her diplomatic contributions and presence at the San Francisco Conference in 1945. Wu was the only woman chosen for the Chinese delegation. Despite initial reservations due to a kidney related illness, Wu accepted the position and had been chosen to represent China due to her short successful political career as a part of the PPC. At the conference, Wu had several responsibilities including revising the preamble and taking part in discussions between nations. Wu also advocated for women's rights, and her responsibility of being part of the team revising the preamble allowed her to ensure the inclusion of women's right in the founding document of the United Nations. Wu opposed the creation of a commission dedicated to investigating women's rights issues because she believed that it inherently separate women and men and should instead focus on human rights over all. Wu was upset that the Chinese delegation often chose to blindly follow the United States agenda, one which never asked the Chinese delegation for any consultation or advice. Along with Minerva Bernardino (Dominican Republic), Virginia Gildersleeve (United States), Bertha Lutz (Brazil), Wu Yi-fang was one of only four women to sign the original UN Charter at the end of the San Francisco conference, and was the only female Asian signatory. After Wu's diplomatic success in San Francisco in 1945, Wu received over 142 requests for her audience, two honorary degrees from American Universities, and gave numerous talks both in person and broadcast across the United States.

== Personal life ==
=== Views on education and domestic life ===
Between 1928 and 1951, Wu Yi-fang was in office as president of the Protestant missionary Gingling Women's College. During those years, specifically 1952, China's communist government shut down the college, however, Wu remained in leadership positions. During China's Maoist period, she expressed support for the ideology. In being a Christian establishment, Gingling Women's College practiced Christian values such as service and stewardship. Her position on this was both the ideological and personal. She criticized the social services provided by the college, arguing that they were indeed a venture of western imperialism, more specifically deeming it as “cultural aggression.” Her more personal views were that the social services undertaken by the college both lacked in longevity, depth in matters of alleviating the distresses of the working and peasant classes of society, and called for a “lifeless” and foreign interpretation of both texts and pursuits of knowledge. This to her was a hindrance and stalling of the kind of political revolution that would result in real and measurable change. Though these were her criticisms during the Maoist period, during the republican regime (1911-1949), Wu served as a dedicated leader of the college, working hard to educate young Chinese women to be of good service to their nation and to God.

In 1927, with the help of other Gingling graduates, she made attempts to materialize the changes they wanted to see for Gingling Women's college. This was to provide services in a way that would be meaningful to China as a developing nation. This was a decolonizing process of transforming the college's notions and practices of western cultural and academic imperialism and creating social service programs that instead reflected indigenous systems and beliefs. A main area of focus was rural and domestic life. This was to bring an end to a culture of elite superiority and practices and “self-orientalism.” A way in which such change was created in the college was in their dealings with rural populations and Christian projects to match the political landscape at the time. After their petitioning it was stipulated that heads of the Christian school must be of Chinese ethnic descent, that religious courses be non compulsory, and that patriotic knowledge and instruction be imbedded in the curriculum. Only after official declaration of new rules did she accept the position of head of Gingling Women's College.

Under her leadership the college also saw an expansion of rural social services during times of war, seeing as to her “social education was a field of service which a Christian college ought to be doing seriously.” In this respect, her concern was that the college was not “training women workers for the rural families.” Wu's initial plan was to create a training course in which young women would be trained in how to work the country. She had hoped to hire a Chinese instructor but in facing difficulty with this she instead encouraged former students to pursue degrees in rural sociology in the United States of America. In a letter to a colleague Wu expressed her attitudes towards this recommendation, saying, “rural conditions in America and here are so different…studies in America cannot help in the practical work, however students could get at the fundamental and the application according to conditions here.” In 1939, Wu was successful in the creation of the Department of Home Economics for which courses began in the fall.

== Death ==
Wu Yi-fang died on November 10, 1985, due to respiratory infections and heart failure.

Her memorial service was held in Nanjing, and more than 700 representatives from diverse backgrounds attended, reflecting the widespread impact she had on the world around her.

== Bibliography ==
- Adami, Rebecca (2018). Women and the Universal Declaration of Human Right. New York, NY: Routledge. ISBN 9780429795527.
- "Introduction to Ginling College: I. The Predecessor of Ginling College -- Ginling Women's University". Ginling College. 9 August 2015.
- Hamrin, Carol Lee. "Wu Yifang". Biographical Dictionary of Chinese Christianity.
- Hannan, Carolyn, Aina Iiyambo, and Christine Brautigam. “A Short History of the Commission on the Status of Women.” UN Women, accessed March 5, 2019. http://www.unwomen.org/-/media/headquarters/attachments/sections/library/publications/2019/a-short-history-of-the-csw-en.pdf?la=en&vs=1153.
- He, Wei 何玮. “Xin nuxing yu jindai ZhongGuo nuzi jiaoyu” 新女性”与近代中国女子教育——吴贻芳个案研究 [The New Women” and Women's Education in Modern China: The Case of Wu Yi-fang]. Huadong ligong daxue waiguo yu xueyuan 华东理工大学外国语学院 (China Academic Journal Electronic Publishing House) 3 (2016): 107-116.
- Schneider, Helen M. (2012). "Mobilising Women: The Women's Advisory Council, Resistance and Reconstruction during China's War with Japan". European Journal of East Asian Studies. 11 (2): 213–236. doi:10.1163/15700615-20121105. JSTOR 23615457.
- Schneider, Helen M. "Raising the Standards of Family Life: Ginling Women’s College and Christian Social Service in Republican China." In Divine Domesticities: Christian Paradoxes in Asia and the Pacific, edited by Choi Hyaeweol and Jolly Margaret, 113–40. ANU Press, 2014. http://www.jstor.org/stable/j.ctt13wwvck.9.
- United Feature Syndicate, Inc. “Eleanor Roosevelt’s “My Day,” 12/10/1943: The Artists Value to the Public.” The White House Historical Association. Accessed March 5, 2019. https://www.whitehousehistory.org/eleanor-roosevelts-my-day-12-10-1943.
- University of Michigan. “Projects: Yi-fang Wu.” Accessed March 5, 2019. https://rackham.umich.edu/project/yi-fang-wu/
- Waelchli, Mary Jo (2002). Abundant life: Matilda Thurston, Wu Yifang and Ginling College, 1915–1951 (Thesis). ProQuest 305496928.
- Yi-fang, Wu (1944). "Education in War-Time China". Pi Lambda Theta Journal. 22 (4): 130–134. JSTOR 42915913.
- Yung, Judy (15 November 1995). Unbound feet: a social history of Chinese women in San Francisco. University of California Press. hdl:2027/heb.02043. ISBN 978-0-520-08867-2.
- Zhou, Heping 周和平. “Wu Yi-fang Nian Biao” 吴贻芳年表 [Wu Yifang Chronology]. Jiangsu Sheng Shehui Zhuyi Xueyuan Xuebao 江苏省社会主义学院学报 (China Academic Journal Electronic Publishing House) 1 (2013): 4-13.
