= Yang Le =

Chinese mathematician (1939–2023)

- 杨乐
- Born: 10 November 1939; Nantong, Jiangsu, China
- Died: 22 October 2023 (aged 83); Beijing, China
- Resting place: Fenghungshan Cemetery, Tianhe Yuan, Area 11, New row 11, Site number 7, Changping District, Beijing, China
- Education: Nantong Middle School of Jiangsu Province; Peking University
- Spouse: Huang Qieyuan
- Awards: National Natural Science Prize of China, Hua Luogeng Mathematics Award, Tan Kah Kee Mathematical Sciences Award, Ho Leung Ho Lee Award, Mathematics Contribution Award by International Congress of Chinese Mathematicians
- Scientific career
- Fields: Mathematics
- Workplaces: Chinese Academy of Sciences
- Doctoral advisor: Xiong Qinglai
- Notable students: Xian-Jin Li, Jianyong Qiao, ShengJian Wu, Guang Yuan Zhang

Yang Le (simplified Chinese: 杨乐; traditional Chinese: 楊樂; pinyin: Yáng Lè; other translation of his name: Yang Lo or Lo Yang; 10 November 1939 – 22 October 2023) was a Chinese mathematician. He was a member of the Chinese Academy of Sciences.

== Biography ==
Yang was born and raised in Nantong, Jiangsu. His father, Yang Jingyuan (Chinese: 杨敬渊), was a businessman and deputy manager of Nantong Tongming Electric Company. His mother was named Zhou Jingjuan (周静娟). He attended the First Primary School affiliated with Nantong Normal College and Nantong High School of Jiangsu Province. He was accepted to Peking University in 1956 and graduated in 1962. After college, he studied mathematics under Xiong Qinglai at the Institute of Mathematics, the Chinese Academy of Sciences, and started working there as a research scientist after completion of the graduate program.

His first paper, Multiple values of meromorphic functions and of their combinations, was completed in 1962 three months after he enrolled in the graduate program at the Institute of Mathematics. It was published in 1964 in Acta Math. Sinica. He and Zhang Guanghou published several papers in Scientia Sinica in 1965 and 1966: Research on the normality of families of analytical functions with multiple values, I. A new criterion and some applications. Scientia Sinica, 14, 1258–1271 (1965); II. Generalizations, Scientia Sinica, 15, 433–453 (1966). The Cultural Revolution interrupted all academic research in China starting in 1966. Yang and Zhang picked up their research late 1971, and published another paper in Scientia Sinica in 1973. Their best results were published there in 1975 and 1976 where they proposed the "Yang-Zhang Theorem". This theorem posited a clear and close connection between two basic concepts in value distribution theory that had long been considered unrelated to each other, the connection between "deficit value" and "singular direction" (Borel direction), and gave a quantitative expression of this connection. This was a breakthrough result that attracted the attention of mathematicians in the field of function theory internationally. In addition, they used constructive methods to solve the problem of the distribution law of singular directions of meromorphic functions, that is, they gave the construction of meromorphic functions with specified Borel directions. After China opened up in 1978, Yang cooperated with mathematicians in other countries, such as David Drasin in the U.S. and Walter K. Hayman in the U.K., and published papers internationally. His monograph, Value Distribution Theory (1993, Springer-Verlag) and its Chinese version, summarize the latest research in the field up to then.

Yang played an important role in the successful re-entry by the Chinese Mathematical Society into International Mathematical Union in 1986. His effort was critical in China's winning the bid to host the 2002 International Congress of Mathematicians. He obtained funding support from the Chinese government, a prerequisite of IMU, and his speech in support of China's bid at the General Assembly of the IMU held in Luzern, Switzerland in 1994 was well received by mathematicians from around the world.

== Personal life ==
Yang Le died in Beijing on 22 October 2023, at the age of 83.
