= Jianghai Plain =

Plain in China

- Chinese: 江海平原
- Location: Yangtze River Delta
- Formation time: 6,000 years ago
- Alternative names: Nantong Plain; Rugao Plain

Jianghai Plain or River and Sea Plain (short for Yangtze River-Yellow Sea Plain, Chinese: 江海平原; pinyin: Jiānghǎi píngyuán), also known as Nantong Plain (南通平原) or Rugao Plain (如皋平原), is a plain is located in the Yangtze River Delta. It is the estuary of the Yangtze River.

Zhang Jian, an industrialist in the period of late Qing Dynasty and early Republic of China (清末民初), planned the pattern of "one city and three towns" on the Jianghai Plain, making Nantong "the first city in modern China".

== Named ==
In the noun "River and Sea Plain", "River" refers to the Yangtze River, and "Sea" refers to the Yellow Sea. This plain is called the "River and Sea Plain" because it is formed by the mutual impact of the Yangtze River and the Yellow Sea.

== Time of formation ==
The discovery of the Qingdun Site (青墩遗址) in 1973 changed the view that there were no sites in the eastern part of Jianghuai during the Neolithic period and advanced the history of the Jianghai Plain by more than 3,000 years. Therefore, the history of the Plain can be traced back to over 6,000 years ago.
