= YiSheng liquor =

Type of Chinese liquor

Yisheng liquor (Chinese: 颐生酒, often marketed simply as Yisheng Jiu) is a historic brand of baijiu and yellow-rice wine produced in Changle Town, Haimen District, Nantong, Jiangsu, China.

== History ==
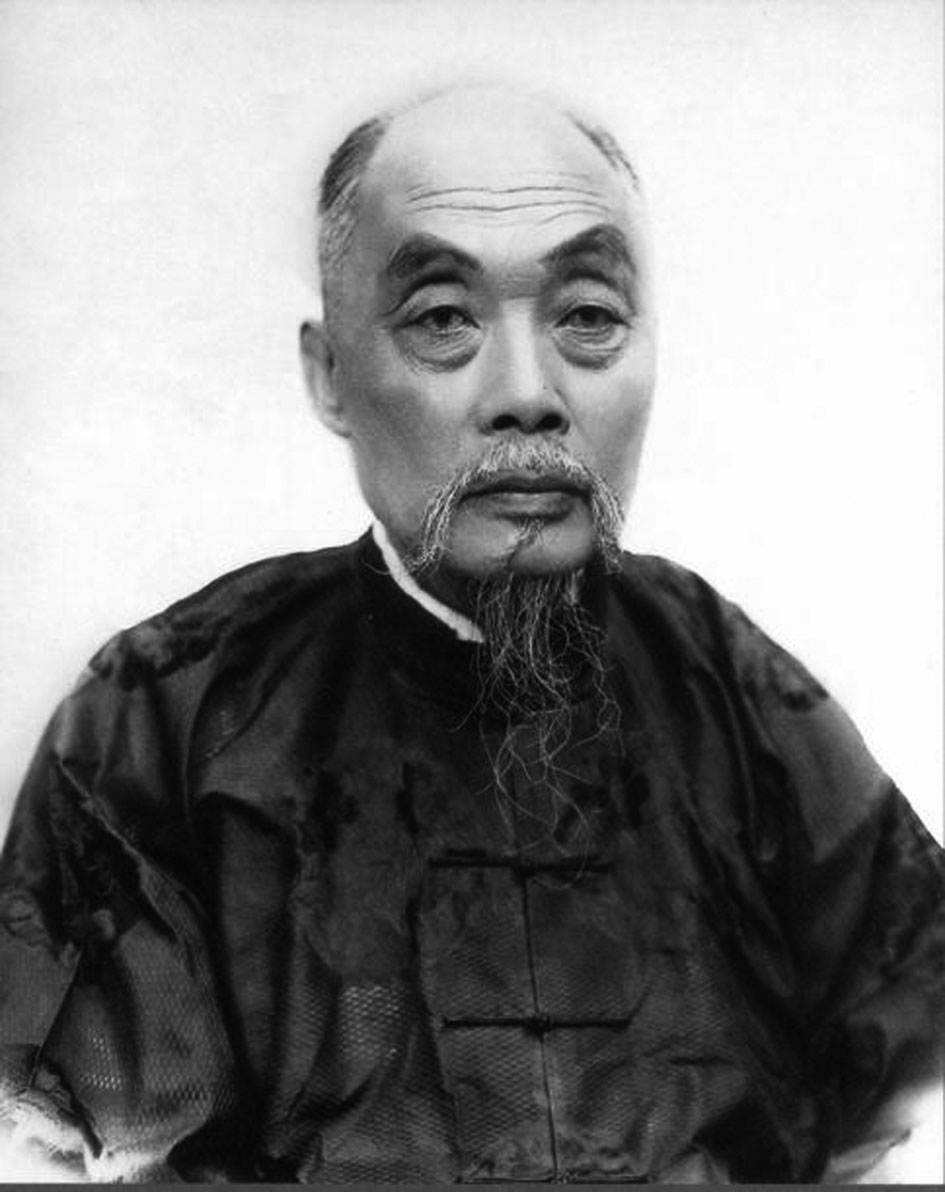
Zhang Jian

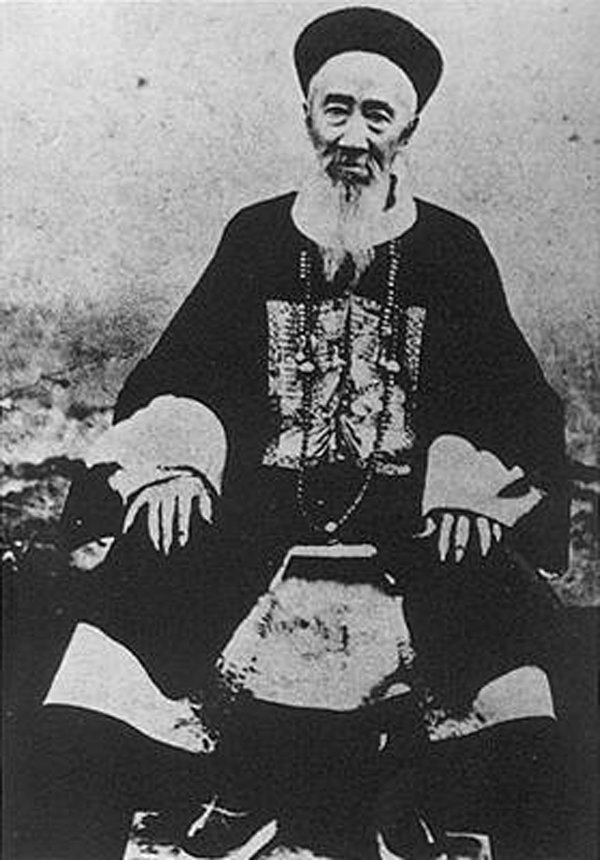
Zhang Zhidong 1837-9-2~1909-10-4

Industrialist and educational reformer Zhang Jian established the original Yisheng Brewing Company in 1894 with encouragement from Viceroy Zhang Zhidong (张之洞). This company was on the west side of the Number One Scholar Street, in ChangLe Town(常乐镇), Haimen.

The distillery shipped its ‘‘Yinchen Daqu’’ herbal spirit to the 1906 Milan International Exposition, where it won a gold medal—the earliest World’s-Fair award recorded for a Chinese liquor. After a period of wartime disruption, the plant was rebuilt in the early 1950s and expanded under public ownership, adopting semi-mechanised lines during the 1970s yet retaining its traditional pit-fermentation system.

In 2011 the brand was recognised as a “China Time-honoured” enterprise, and its brewing technique was inscribed on the Jiangsu Provincial Intangible Cultural Heritage list.

== Products ==
The flagship is ‘‘Yinchen Daqu,’’ an amber spirit scented with wormwood and marketed at 38 %–52 % ABV. Other labels include ‘‘Jianweng’’ (a sauce-aroma baijiu developed under master blender Ji Keliang in 1986) and a range of low-proof rice wines and fruit liqueurs.

== Ownership and operations ==
Nantong Yisheng Wine Industry Co., Ltd. is a privately held company incorporated in 2004 and registered at Yisheng Village, Changle Town, with Quanhui Zhang as general manager. Bloomberg records list 2004 as the official founding year of the modern entity while noting that production traces back to 1894.
