= Langshan (Nantong) =

Hill in Nantong, China

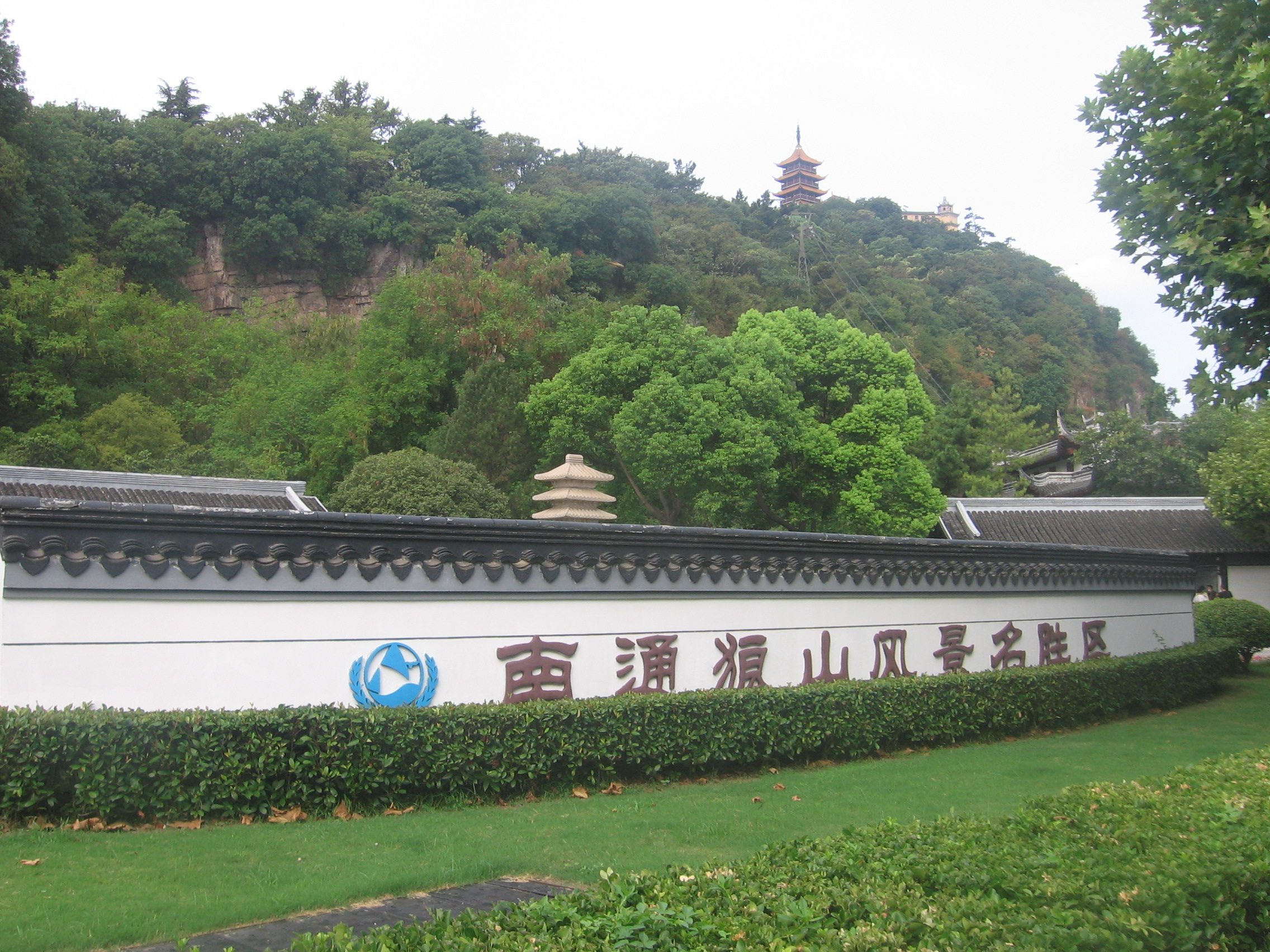
Langshan (Wolf Hill)

Langshan or Wolf Hill (Chinese: 狼山) is a hill and scenic area in Jiangsu Province, China. It lies in the south of Nantong, near the Yangtze River.

== Name ==
In 990 to 994, an official named Yangjun took charge of Nantong. Disapproving of the name "Wolf Hill", he renamed it as "Langshan" with the meaning of beauty. Some years later, people began calling the hill Zilangshan because of the many purple rocks on the hill. Because of this, Nantong acquired the name of Zilang.

== The five hills ==
The Langshan scenic area consists of five hills, all of which are surrounded by water:

- Langshan (狼山)
- Huangnishan (黄泥山)
- Jianshan (剑山)
- Junshan (军山)
- Ma'anshan (马鞍山)

=== Wolf Hill ===
Langshan (Wolf Hill) stands about 106.94 meters high, and covers 18 hectares. It is considered to be the most splendid among the five hills. As a result, the area is named after the hill. It is said that white wolves used to live on Wolf Hill. Apart from this saying, the hill looks like a wolf in its appearance, hence its name. It is said that the name of Langshan is from the appearance of it or the white wolves which had ever lived in it.

The founder of Wolf Mountain was the Great Zen master Sengjia (僧伽大圣禪師). According to legend, the Sengjia was the incarnation of the Eleven-faced Guanyin, who came to find the Bodhimanda for the Great Bodhisattva. Legend has it that this mountain was occupied by a white wolf spirit (白狼精) at that time, thus its name. Sengjia and the white wolf spirit had a fight, ending with the Zen master subduing the wolf. The white wolf then retreated. Sengjia built the first Bodhimanda for the Bodhisattva, which is today's Guangjiao Temple.

== Features and attractions ==
In addition, Wolf Hill is also famous as a Buddhist hill. There are plenty of Buddhist activities here. Even though Wolf Hill is not tall, it is prominent on the Jiangsu plain and receives many visitors. The calligrapher Mi Fu visited here and believed it to be the best hill in the world. The poet Luo Binwang chose the hill as his final resting place and had his body buried there.

There are many cultural relics and historic sites.

== Sponsorship ==
In order to speed up the pace of tourism informatization and make the brand of "digital scenic spot", the Langshan scenic area strategically cooperates with Nantong mobile unlimited city. Its aim is the expansion he application of information of scenic area tourism with the help of the mobile wireless network and platform of the city.
