= Nantong Museum =

Museum in Nantong, Jiangsu, China

Coordinates: 32.013218°N 120.864809°E

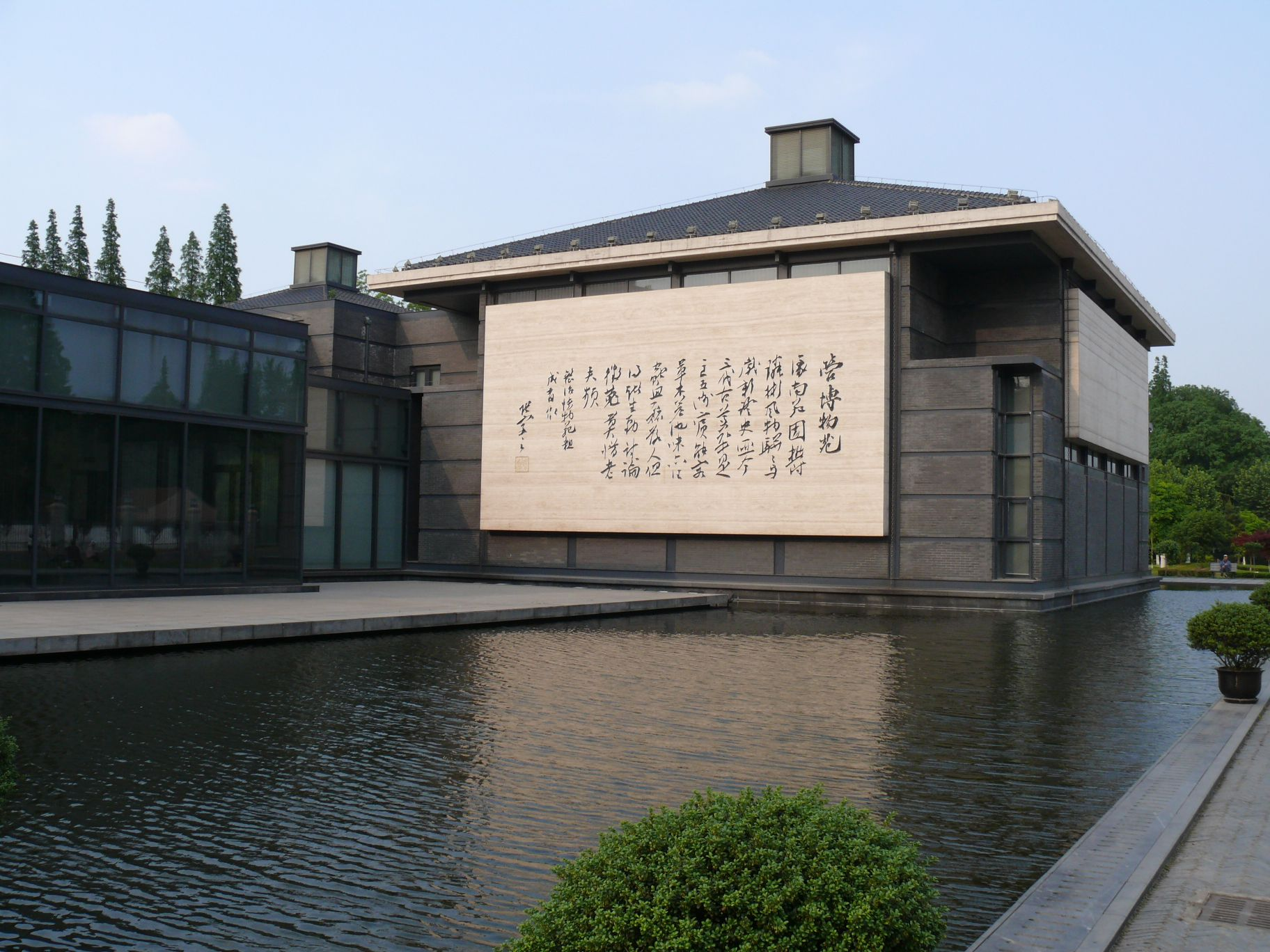
- Nantong Museum
- Established: 1905
- Location: 19 Qixiu Road, Chongchuan District, Nantong, China

Nantong Museum (Chinese: 南通博物苑; pinyin: Nántōng Bówùyuàn) is located in Nantong, Jiangsu Province, China, at 19 Qixiu Road in Chongchuan District. It is near the center of the city, beside the Haohe river. It was established by a well-known educator, Zhang Jian in 1905. It is made of five parts, the center, the south, the north, the east, and the west. It is one of the oldest museums in China.

== Buildings ==
=== Original ===
The original museum occupied three main buildings in the center, south, and north, used to display specimens of science, history, art and education.

=== Additions ===
Fifty years later, miniature garden displaying rooms, tea houses and other amusement facilities have been added to the big museum. Therefore, Nantong museum is a local comprehensive museum and a unique park. The most notable cultural property displayed are Neolithic finds.

=== Architecture ===
The central building is a Chinese-style single-storey house with two floors while the south is a western-style building. The north building is in traditional Chinese style with two floors. The eastern one is Chinese style as well. In the yard, there are plenty of trees and flowers accompanied by birds and other animals. There are also pavilions and ponds.

== Exhibits ==
The objects in Nantong museum are both historical and natural. The total count is about 50 thousand. The historical remains mostly represent local culture from the ancient times to now. The natural ones stand for not only the plants and animals in Nantong, but also in the whole country and the world.

The southern and center museums have a great many historical relics. The southern one contains most of local historical remains and, outside, there are huge relics. In the reconstructed "old elephant pavilion", there are pictures of supernatural beings. The western one consists of various kinds of natural specimen. The most famous display is the framework of a whale.

== Picture gallery ==
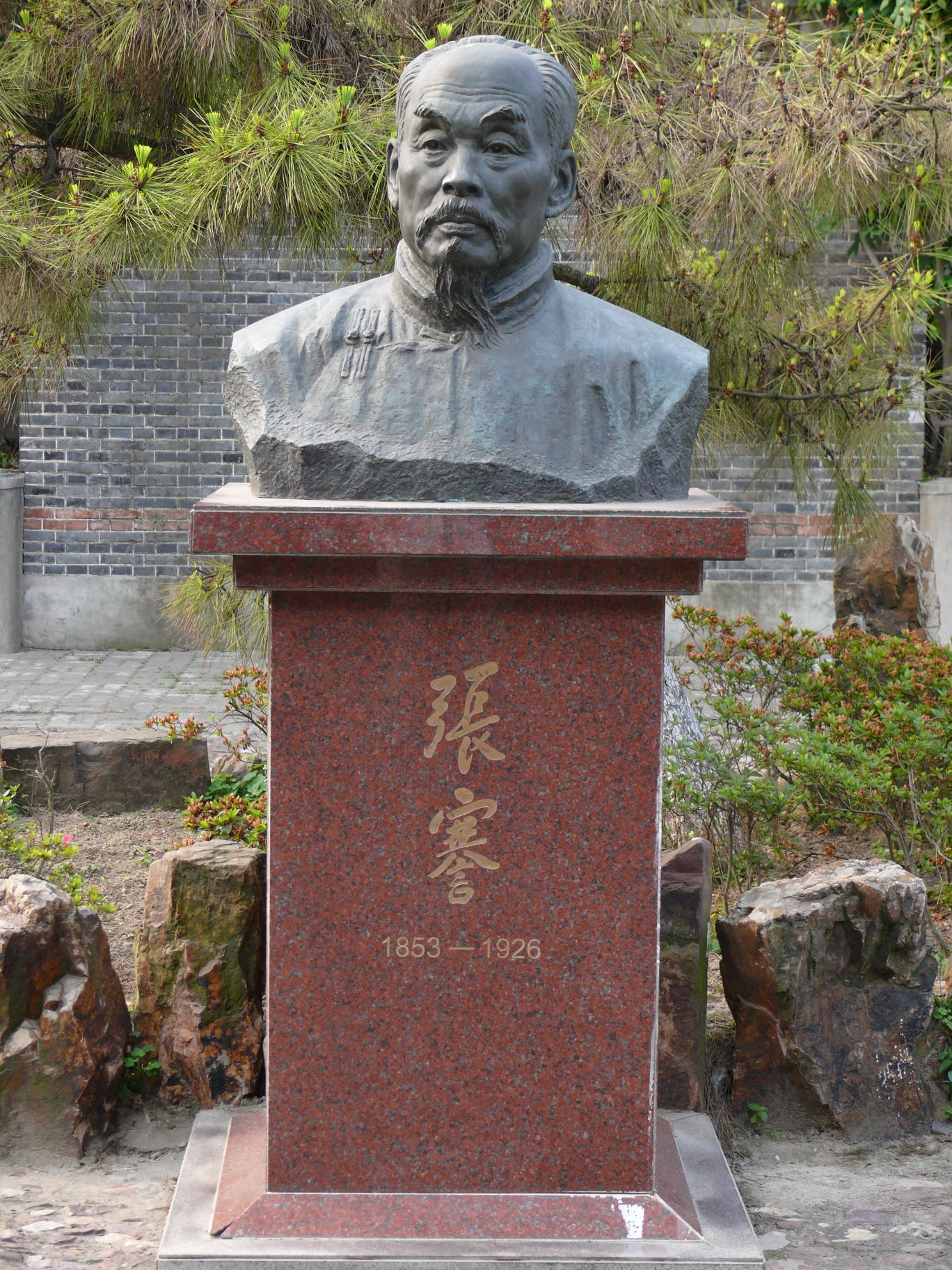
Zhang Jian statue at Nantong museum

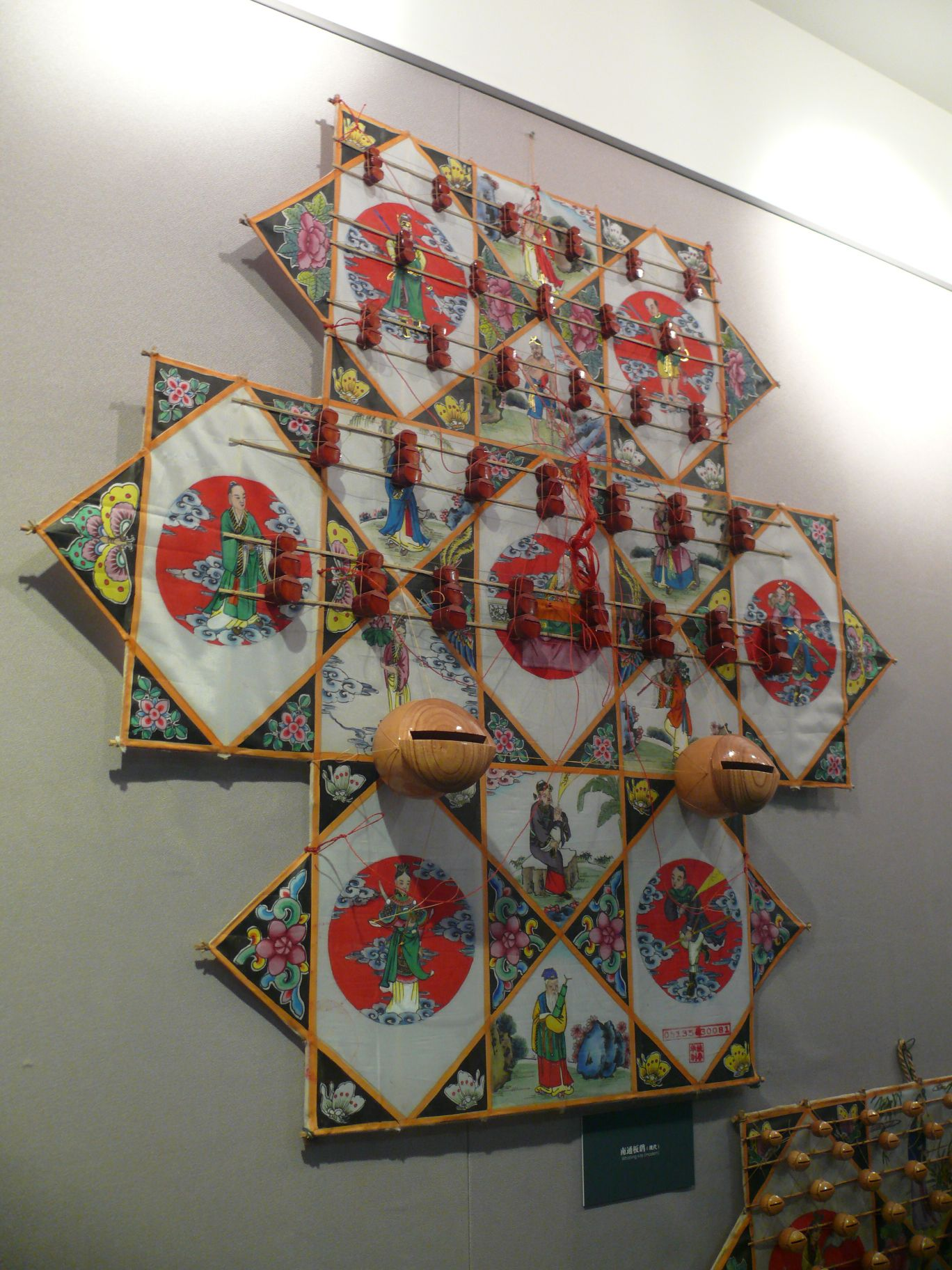
Kite at Nantong museum

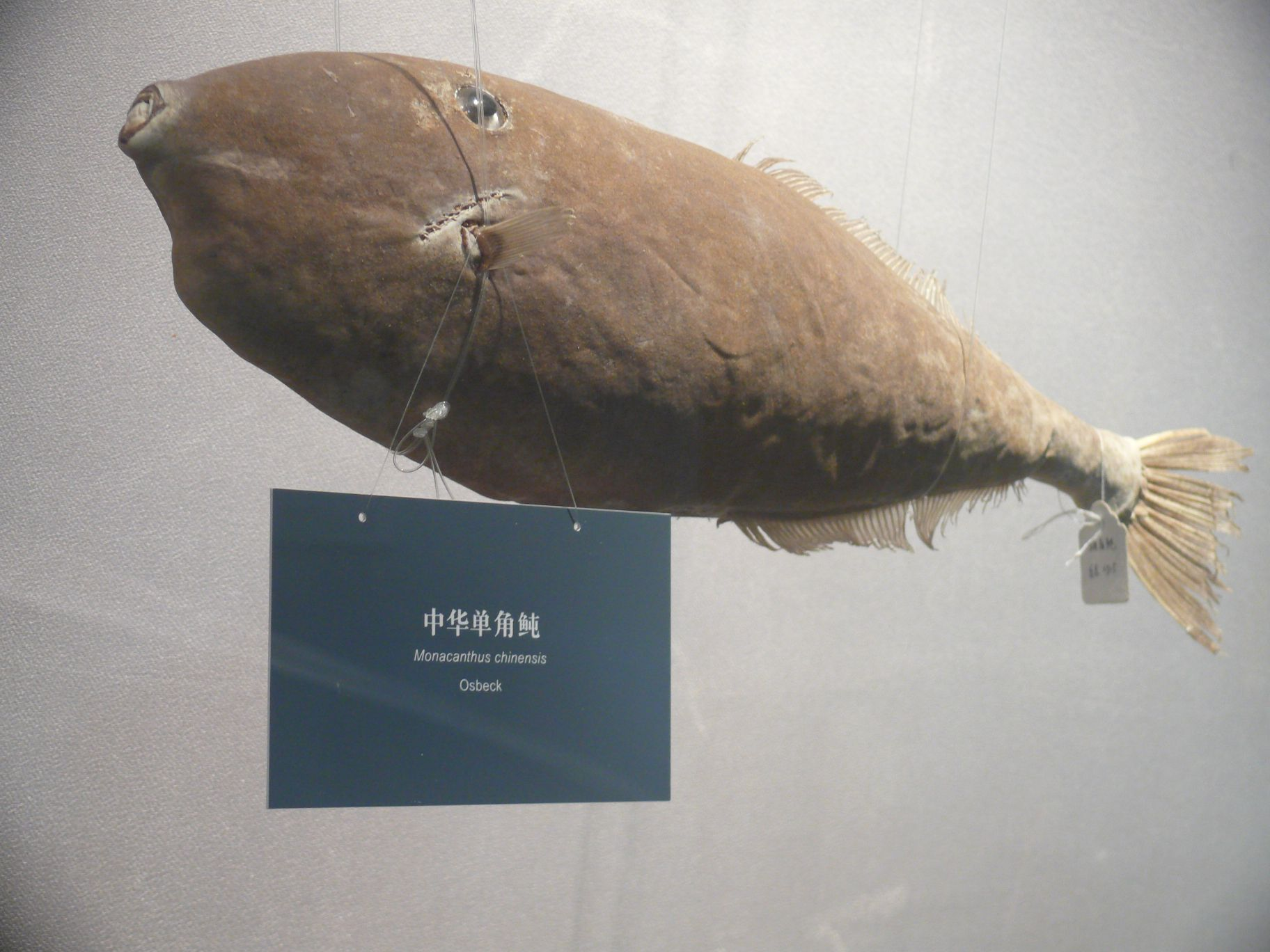
Monacanthus chinensis at Nantong museum

== See also ==
- List of museums in China
