= Chinese frigate Nantong =

A number of vessels of the People's Liberation Army Navy have borne the name Nantong, after the city Nantong.

- Chinese frigate Nantong (511), a Type 053H frigate. In service from 1977 until 2012.
- Chinese frigate Nantong (601), a Type 054A frigate, in service since 2019.
