= Nantong Middle School of Jiangsu Province =

Nantong High School of Jiangsu Province
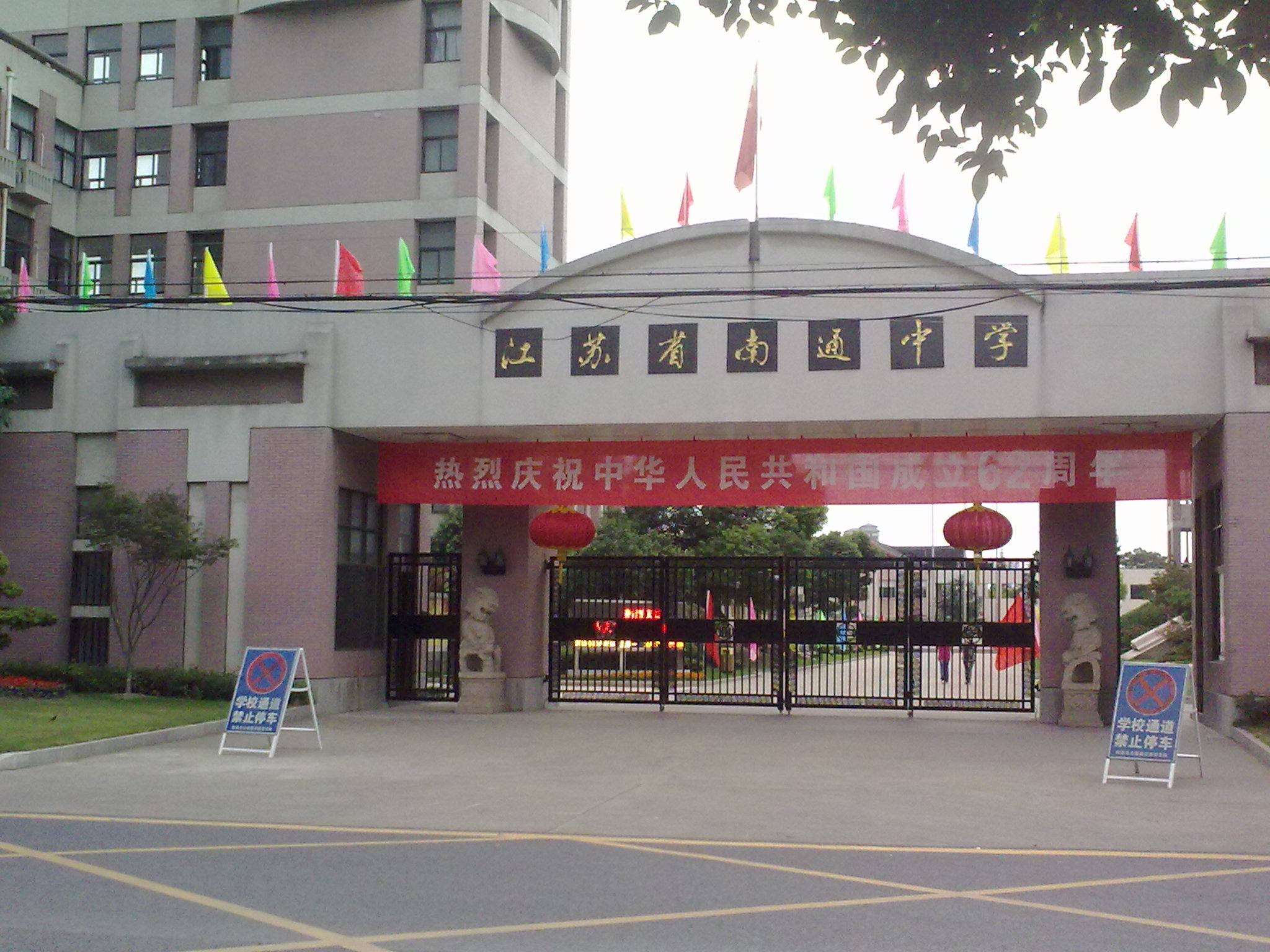

Location
- 9, Zhongxuetang Street; Nantong, Jiangsu, China
- Coordinates: 32°1′18.55″N 120°51′53.8″E

Information
- Type: State school
- Established: 1909
- Principal: Cheng Jinping
- Enrollment: about 6,000
- Campus: Urban
- Website: Official site

Nantong High School of Jiangsu Province (Chinese: 江苏省南通中学 shortname: 通中, Tong-Zhong) is a high school in Nantong, Jiangsu, People's Republic of China. It has been regarded as an elite school since the 1930s. Alumni include 20 academicians of the Chinese Academy of Sciences and the Chinese Academy of Engineering, 5 summer Olympics game gold medalists, many nationally renowned artists, and an exceptional number of politicians and public servants.

Nantong High School of Jiangsu Province was funded in 1909 by Zhang Jian, a well-known industrialist and educator in the late Qing Dynasty. It was the first modern middle school in the city of Nantong. It is now one of the provincial key middle schools in Jiangsu. The school motto is Cheng-Heng (Simplified Chinese: 诚恒; English: honesty in a man and perseverance in study).

The school is highly selective. Admission of pupils are judged almost exclusively by the scores in entrance exams. Exceptions are made only when the pupil is considered talented.

== Notable alumni ==
=== Scientists ===
- Wei Jiangong (魏建功): linguist, member of the Chinese Academy of Sciences
- Yuan Hanqing (袁翰清): chemist, member of the Chinese Academy of Sciences
- Li Ta-tsien (李大潜 Li Daqian), mathematician, member of the French Academy of Sciences
- Yang lo (杨乐): mathematician, member of the Chinese Academy of Sciences
- Wang Xi (王曦): physicist, member of the Chinese Academy of Sciences
- Guan Weiyan (管惟炎): physicist, member of the Chinese Academy of Sciences
- Shi Yafeng (施雅风): geologist, member of the Chinese Academy of Sciences
- Yan Zhida (严志达): mathematician, member of the Chinese Academy of Sciences
- Zhang Miman (张弥曼): paleontologist, member of the Chinese Academy of Sciences

=== Politicians ===
- Gu Hao (顾浩): former vice-governor of Jiangsu Province
- Huang Zhendong (黄镇东): former minister of Ministry of Transportation
- Li Jinhua (李金华): former auditor-general, National Audit Office
- He Zhukang (何竹康): former governor of Henan Province, former governor of Jilin Province

=== Artists ===
- Zao Wou-Ki (赵无极): painter, member of the Académie des Beaux-Arts in Paris
- Fan Zeng (范曾): painter, poet, calligrapher
