= Guangjiao Temple (Nantong) =

Buddhist temple on Mount Lang, China

- 广教寺
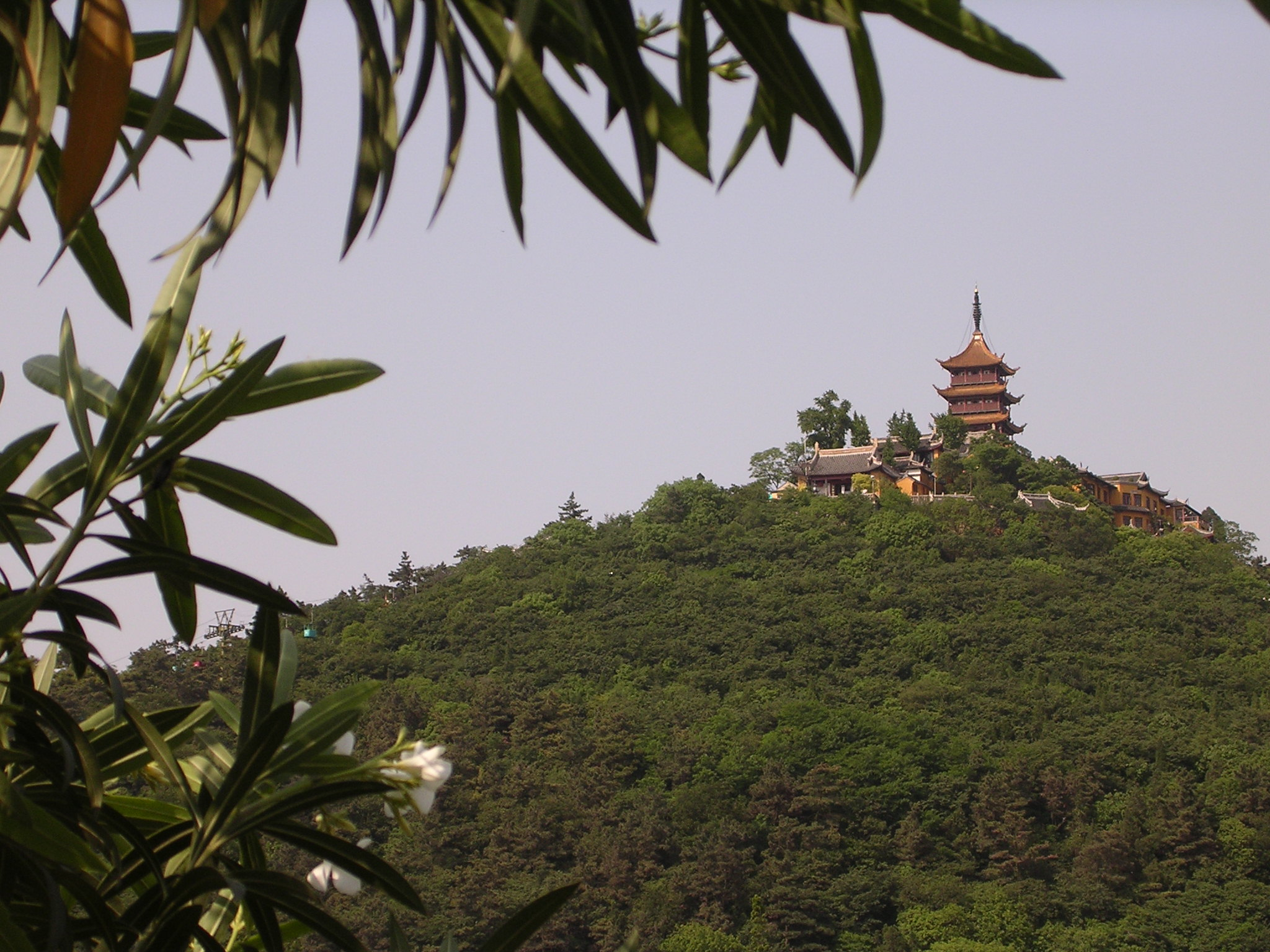
- Guangjiao Temple

- Location within Jiangsu Location within China

Religion
- Affiliation: Buddhism
- Leadership: Shi Juncai (释俊才)

Location
- Location: Nantong, Jiangsu
- Country: China
- Interactive map of Guangjiao Temple
- Coordinates: 31°57′17″N 120°53′44″E

Architecture
- Style: Chinese architecture
- Founder: Sengjia (僧伽)
- Established: 669

Guangjiao Temple (simplified Chinese: 广教寺; traditional Chinese: 廣教寺; pinyin: Guǎngjiào Sì) is a Buddhist temple located on the top of Mount Lang (狼山; 'Wolf Mountain'), in Nantong, Jiangsu, China. The temple is dedicated to the Bodhisattva Dashizhi.

== History ==
Guangjiao Temple was first built by Sengjia (僧伽) in 669, under the Tang dynasty (618–907). At that time, it initially called "Cihang Temple" (慈航院) The name was changed into "Guangjiao Temple" in 958, during the Five Dynasties and Ten Kingdoms (907–960). During the Taiping Xingguo period (976–983) of the Song dynasty (960–1279), Zhihuan (智幻) settled at Guangjiao Temple, where he disseminated Buddhism.

After the 3rd Plenary Session of the 11th Central Committee of the Chinese Communist Party in 1980, local government restored and redecorated the temple. Guangjiao Temple has been classified as a National Key Buddhist Temple in Han Chinese Area by the State Council of China in 1983.

== Architecture ==
The existing main buildings include the Yuantong-dian, Dafo-dian, Dabei-dian, Tianwang-dian, Zangjing-ge, abbot's room, monk's dwellings and a pagoda named "Zhiyuan" (支云塔).

=== Yuantong-dian ===
The Yuantong-dian ("Yuantong Hall") enshrines statues of the Three Sages of the West (西方三圣), namely Amituofo, Guanyin and Dashizhi.

=== Dafo-dian ===
The Dafo-dian ("Great Buddha Hall") is three rooms wide and three rooms deep. It still preserves the architectural style of the Ming dynasty (1368–1644). A statue of Shijiamouni is enshrined in the middle of the hall. Inner walls are painted with frescos.

=== Zhiyun Pagoda ===
The Zhiyun Pagoda was first built between 976 and 984 in the Song dynasty (960–1279). The 35-metre (115 ft) pagoda has the brick and wood structure with five stories and four sides. Curved bars and cornices are set on each story, which are magnificent and become the symbol of Guangjiao Temple.
