= Zhang Jian (businessman) =

Chinese entrepreneur, politician and educator (1853–1926)

- 張謇
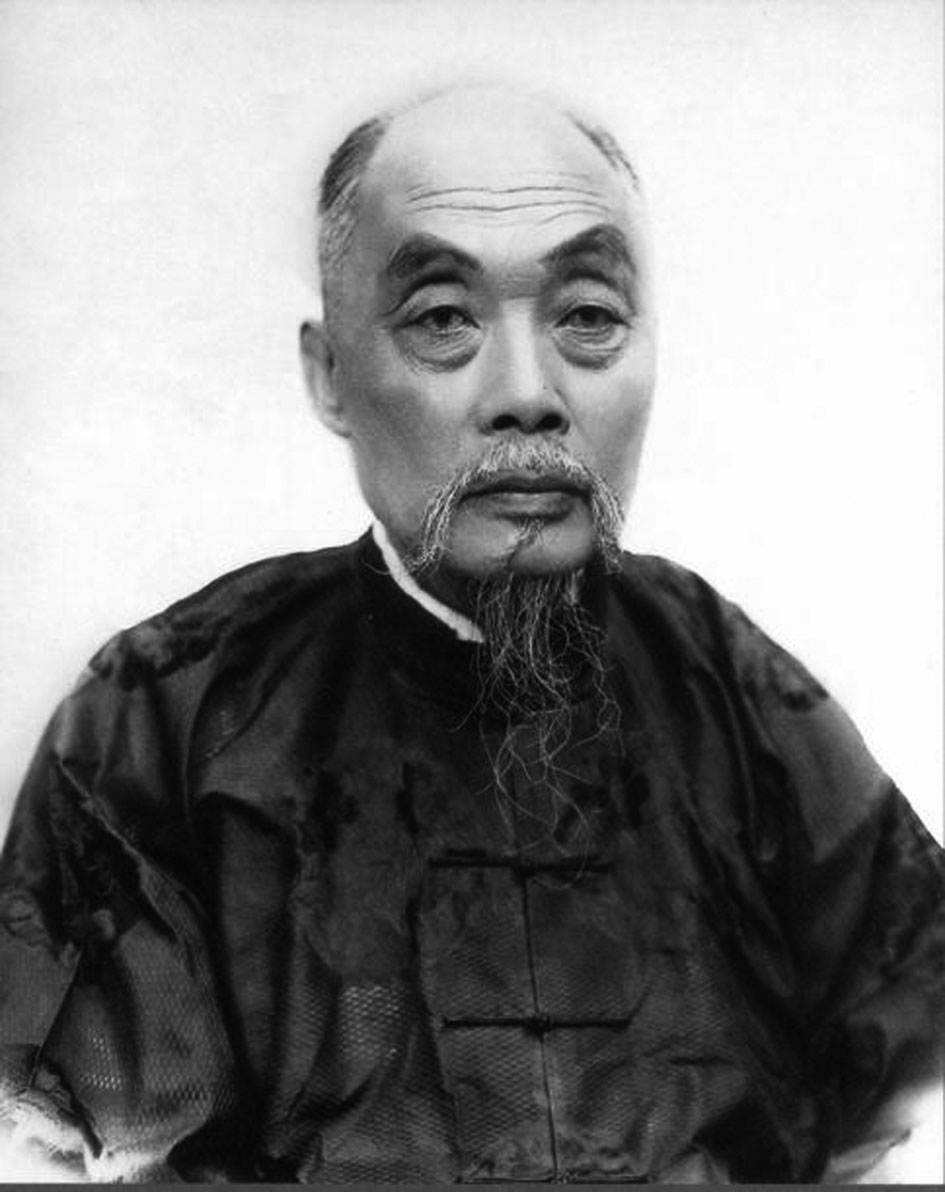

Minister of Agriculture, Industry, and Commerce
- In office December 1913 – April 1915
- Premier: Xiong Xiling
- Preceded by: position created
- Succeeded by: Zhou Ziqi

Minister of Agriculture
- In office September – December 1913
- Premier: Xiong Xiling
- Preceded by: Luo Zhenfang
- Succeeded by: position abolished

Minister of Industry and Commerce
- In office September – December 1913
- Premier: Xiong Xiling
- Preceded by: Xiang Ruikun
- Succeeded by: position abolished

Minister of Agriculture, Industry, and Commerce of the Qing Dynasty
- In office 1 July 1911 – 12 July 1912
- Monarch: Xuantong Emperor
- Prime Minister: Yuan Shikai
- Preceded by: Pulun
- Succeeded by: vacant (next: Li Shengduo)

Personal details
- Born: 1 July 1853 Haimen, Jiangsu, Qing Empire
- Died: 24 August 1926 (aged 73) Nantong, Jiangsu, Republic of China
- Party: Progressive Party
- Education: zhuangyuan in the Imperial examination
- Occupation: entrepreneur, politician and educator

Chinese name
- Traditional Chinese: 張謇
- Simplified Chinese: 张謇
Transcriptions
Standard Mandarin
- Hanyu Pinyin: Zhāng Jiǎn
- Wade–Giles: Chang^{1} Chien^{3}

Zhang Jian (Chinese: 張謇; 1 July 1853– 24 August 1926), courtesy name Jizhi (季直), art name Se'an (啬庵), was a Chinese entrepreneur, politician and educator. He is known as a "new gentry" and official-entrepreneur.

== Biography ==
Zhang was born in Haimen county, Jiangsu province in 1853. He initially served as a staff member under the general Wu Changqing. After Wu's death, he returned to his hometown where he studied agriculture while preparing for further examinations. In 1894, he achieved the highest score in the Palace Examination, earning the prestigious title of zhuangyuan. Subsequently, he served at the Hanlin Academy.

Zhang was obliged to return to his hometown for mourning his father in the same year. After the First Sino-Japanese War, he ventured into investing in and establishing modern enterprises. He later founded Dah Sun Cotton Mill in Nantong, financed by both the imperial court and local merchants. Additionally, he diversified into land reclamation, river conservancy, and modern education, especially in the northern Jiangsu. It is generally accepted that Zhang is a successful entrepreneur, however, some financial improprieties led Dah Sun to an insolvent liquidation in the 1920s.

Zhang proclaimed that "the victory of Japan and the defeat of Russia are the victory of constitutionalism and the defeat of monarchism". In 1909, he was elected the chairman of Jiangsu provincial assembly. He refused the membership of the Friends of the Constitution, and acted as a buffer against the active constitutionalists. But in the end of 1911, his thought swung in the republican's favour. Then he drafted the original Edict of Abdication for Puyi. He was appointed as the Minister of Enterprise of the temporary government of the Provisional Government in Nanjing, but did not take the office actually. In 1913, Zhang became the Minister of Industry and Commerce and Minister of Agriculture and Forestry in Beiyang Government.

== Achievements ==
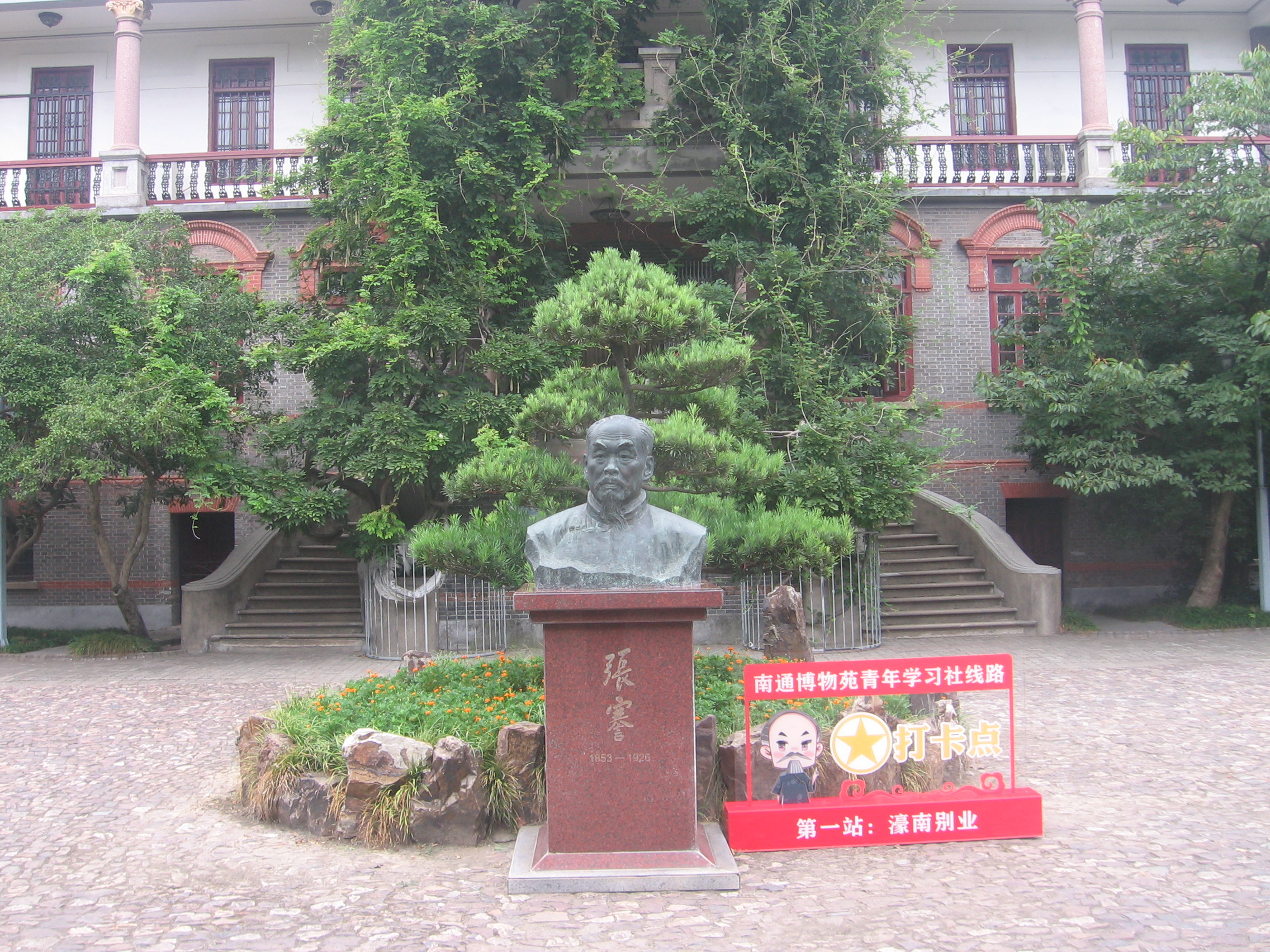
Statue of Zhang Jian

Zhang was among the pioneers of the Chinese modernization. Aside from companies and factories, he also founded the first normal school in modern China, Tongzhou Normal College in 1902 and established Nantong Museum, the first museum in mainland China in 1905. He remoulded the infrastructure of Nantong and made it became a template for earlier urban development in China.

The institutes founded or funded by Zhang Jian:

- Nantong University (1902)
- Fudan University (1905)
- Nantong Middle School of Jiangsu Province (1909)
- Shanghai Ocean University (1912)
- Hohai University (1915)

== Legacy ==
In his statements that private companies must serve the state, Xi Jinping cites Zhang as an example of a patriotic entrepreneur whose example should be followed.
