= Nantong =

City in China

Nantong 南通市 Nantung
- Prefecture-level city
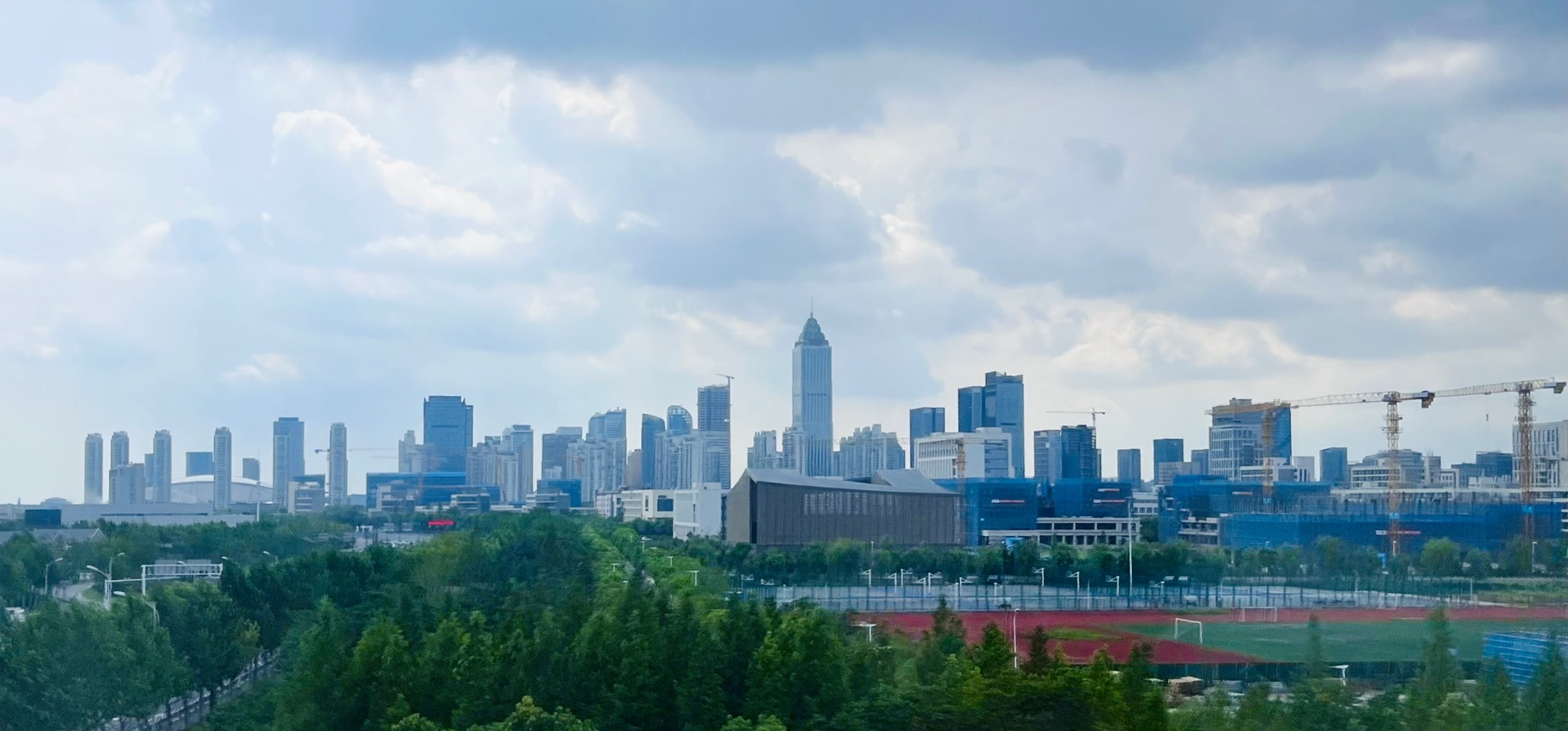
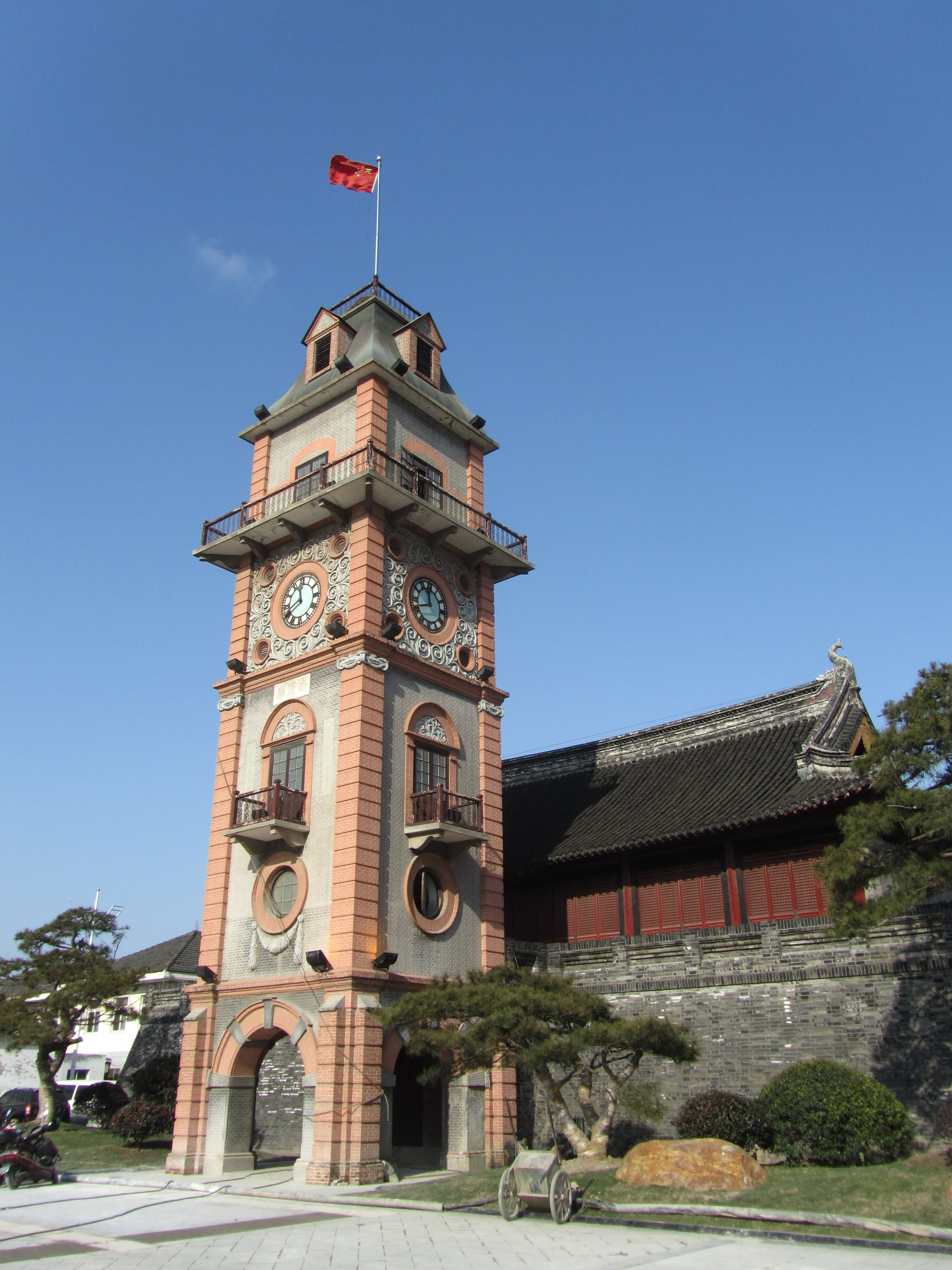
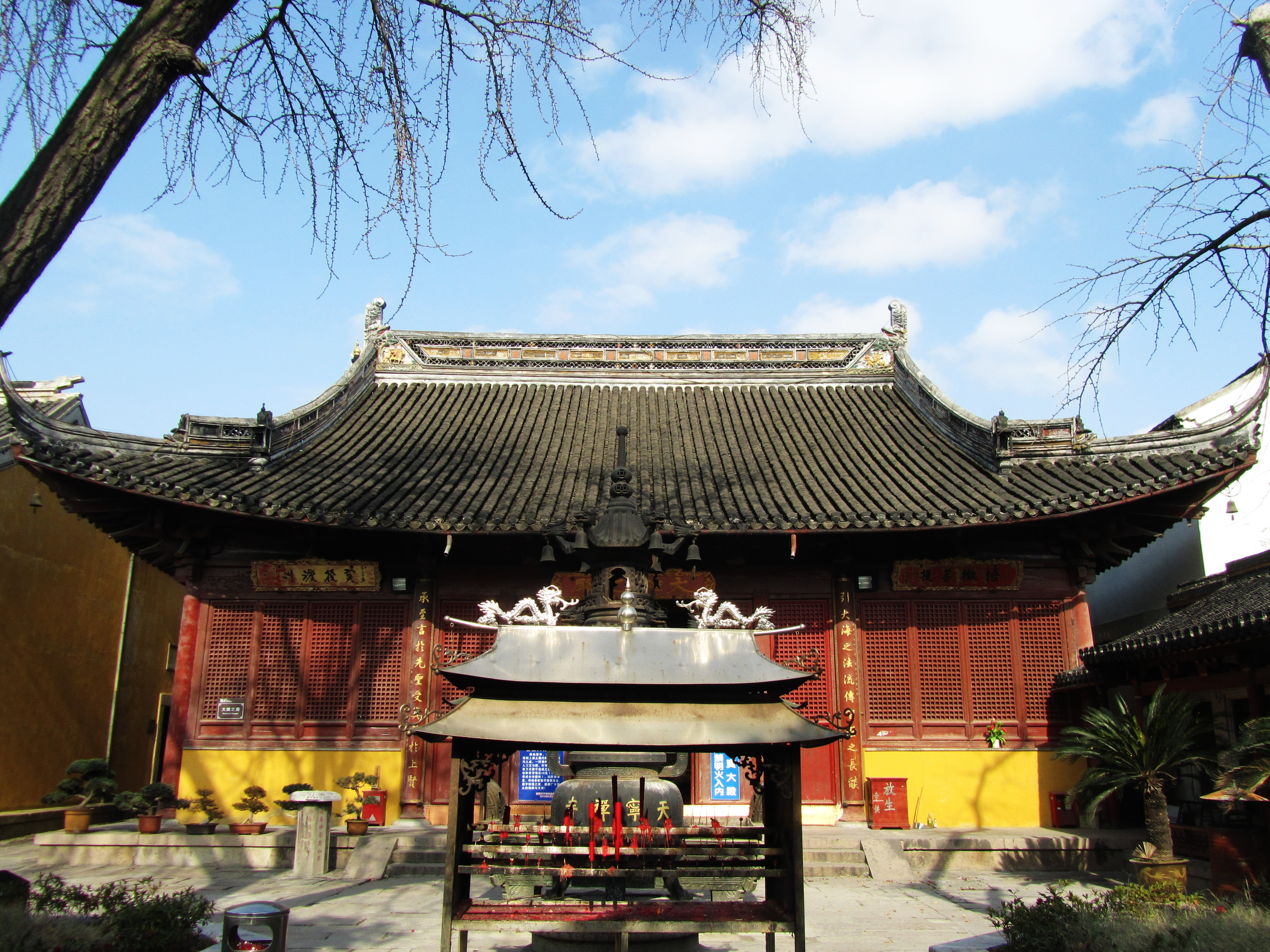
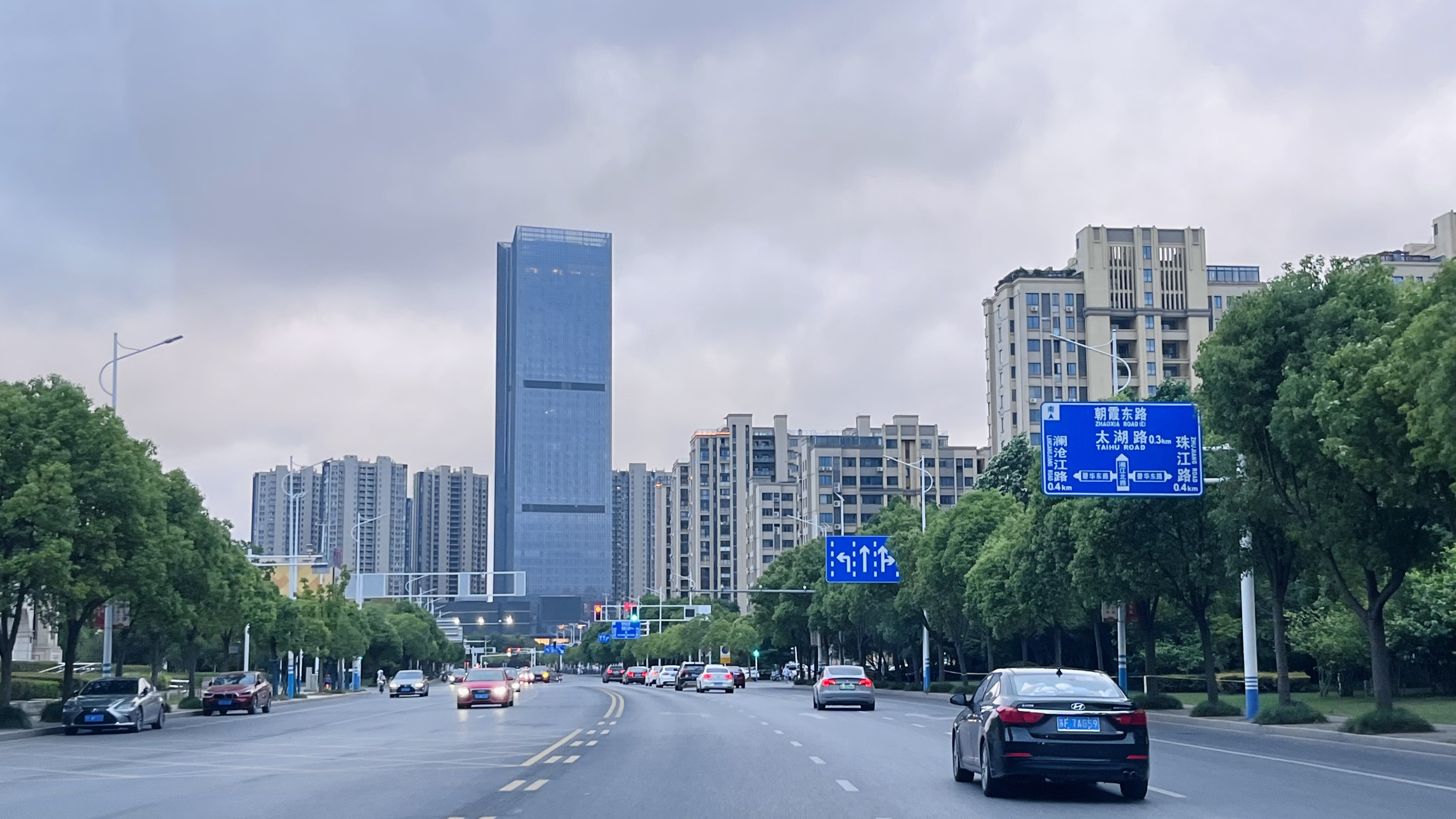
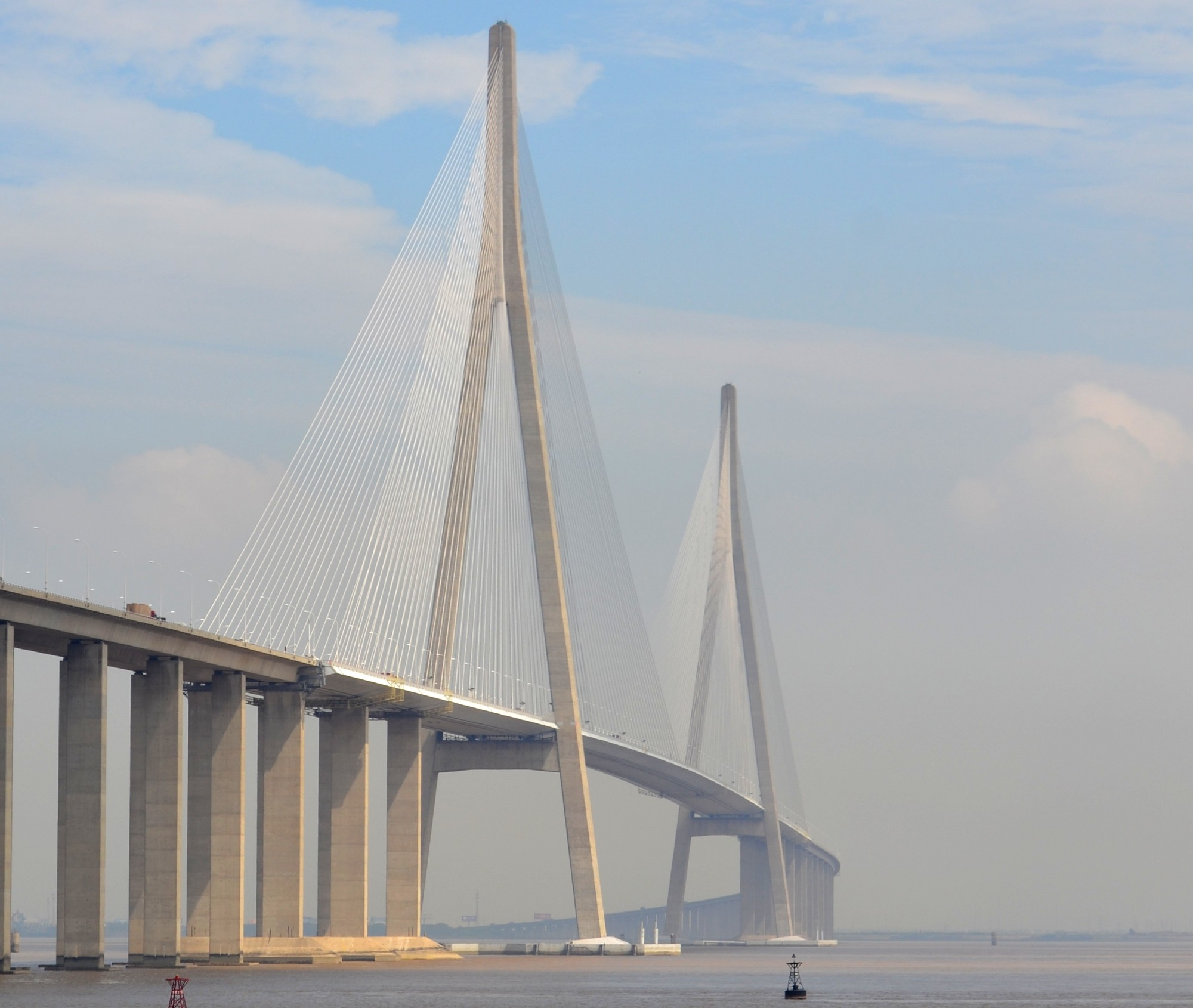
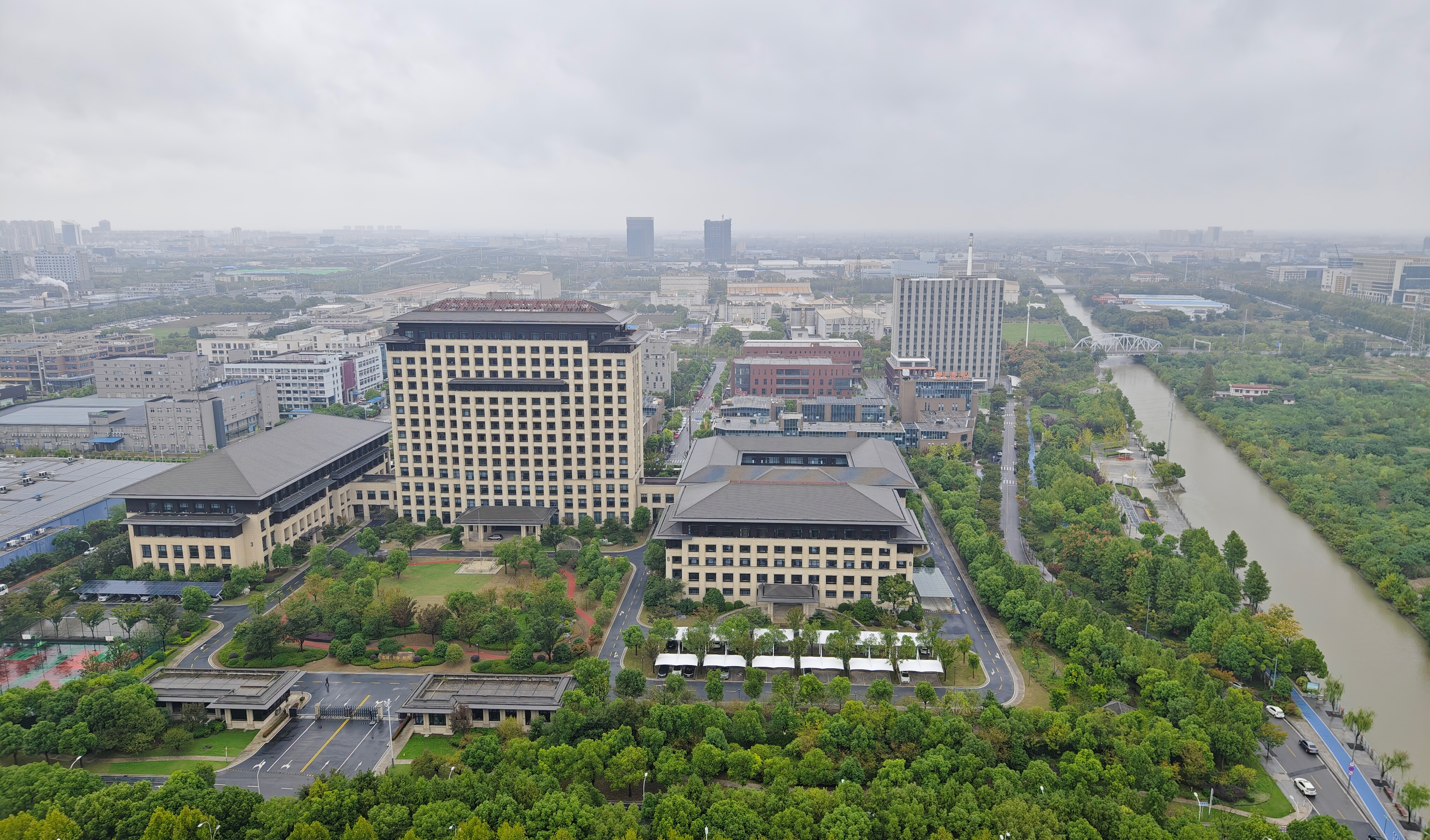
- Skyline of Nantong CBD Nantong Bell Tower Tianning Temple Tongzhou District Sutong Yangtze River Bridge Nantong University

- Location of Nantong City jurisdiction in Jiangsu

- Location of the city center in Jiangsu Nantong (Eastern China) Nantong (China)
- Coordinates (Nantong municipal government): 31°58′52″N 120°53′38″E
- Country: People's Republic of China
- Province: Jiangsu
- Municipal seat: Chongchuan District

Government
  - CPC Municipal Secretary: Lu Zhipeng (陆志鹏)
  - Mayor: Han Liming (韩立明)

Area
  - Prefecture-level city: 8,544.1 km^{2} (3,298.9 sq mi)
  - Urban: 2,840 km^{2} (1,100 sq mi)
  - Metro: 2,840 km^{2} (1,100 sq mi)
- Elevation: 2 m (6.6 ft)

Population (2020 census)
  - Prefecture-level city: 7,726,635
  - Density: 904.32/km^{2} (2,342.2/sq mi)
  - Urban: 3,766,534
  - Urban density: 1,330/km^{2} (3,430/sq mi)
  - Metro: 3,766,534
  - Metro density: 1,330/km^{2} (3,430/sq mi)

GDP (2025)
  - Prefecture-level city: CN¥ 1.280,15 trillion US$ 187,47 billion
  - Per capita: CN¥ 142,642; US$ 21,211
- Time zone: UTC+8 (China Standard)
- Postal code: 226000 (Urban centre); 226100-226600 (Other areas)
- Area code: 513
- ISO 3166 code: CN-JS-06
- Major Ethnicity: Han
- County-level divisions: 8
- Township-level divisions: 146
- Licence Plate Prefixes: 苏F
- Website: www.nantong.gov.cn

Nantong (Note: Chinese: 南通; pinyin: Nántōng; alternate names: Nan-t'ung, Nantung, Tongzhou, or Tungchow; Qihai dialect: [nie tʰoŋ]) is a prefecture-level city in southeastern Jiangsu province, China. Located on the northern bank of the Yangtze River, near the river mouth. Nantong is a vital river port bordering Yancheng to the north; Taizhou to the west; Suzhou, Wuxi and Shanghai to the south across the river; and the East China Sea to the east. Its population was 7,726,635 as of the 2020 census, 3,766,534 of whom lived in the built-up area made up of three urban districts.

On September 26, 2004, the first World Metropolitan Development Forum was held in Nantong. In 2005, Nantong had a GDP growth of 15.4%, the highest growth rate in Jiangsu province, and in 2016 Nantong's GDP had a total of about 675 billion yuan, ranking 21st in the whole country.

Although the city took a blow from the economic depression of the 1930s, as well as the Japanese occupation of the 1930s and 40s, Nantong has remained an important center for the textile industry. Because of its deepwater harbor and connections to inland navigational canals, it was one of 14 port cities opened to foreign investment in recent Chinese economic reforms.

== History ==
The landmass of Nantong is a geologically recent formation, created over centuries by alluvial accretion at the mouth of the Yangtze River. The territory emerged from a landscape of coastal shoals, and its coastline progressively expanded southeastward as the river's main channel shifted. This process was highly unstable; the area of modern Haimen was submerged for extended periods before re-emerging from the water. The region's present landform did not fully stabilize until the late 19th century.

=== Imperial era ===
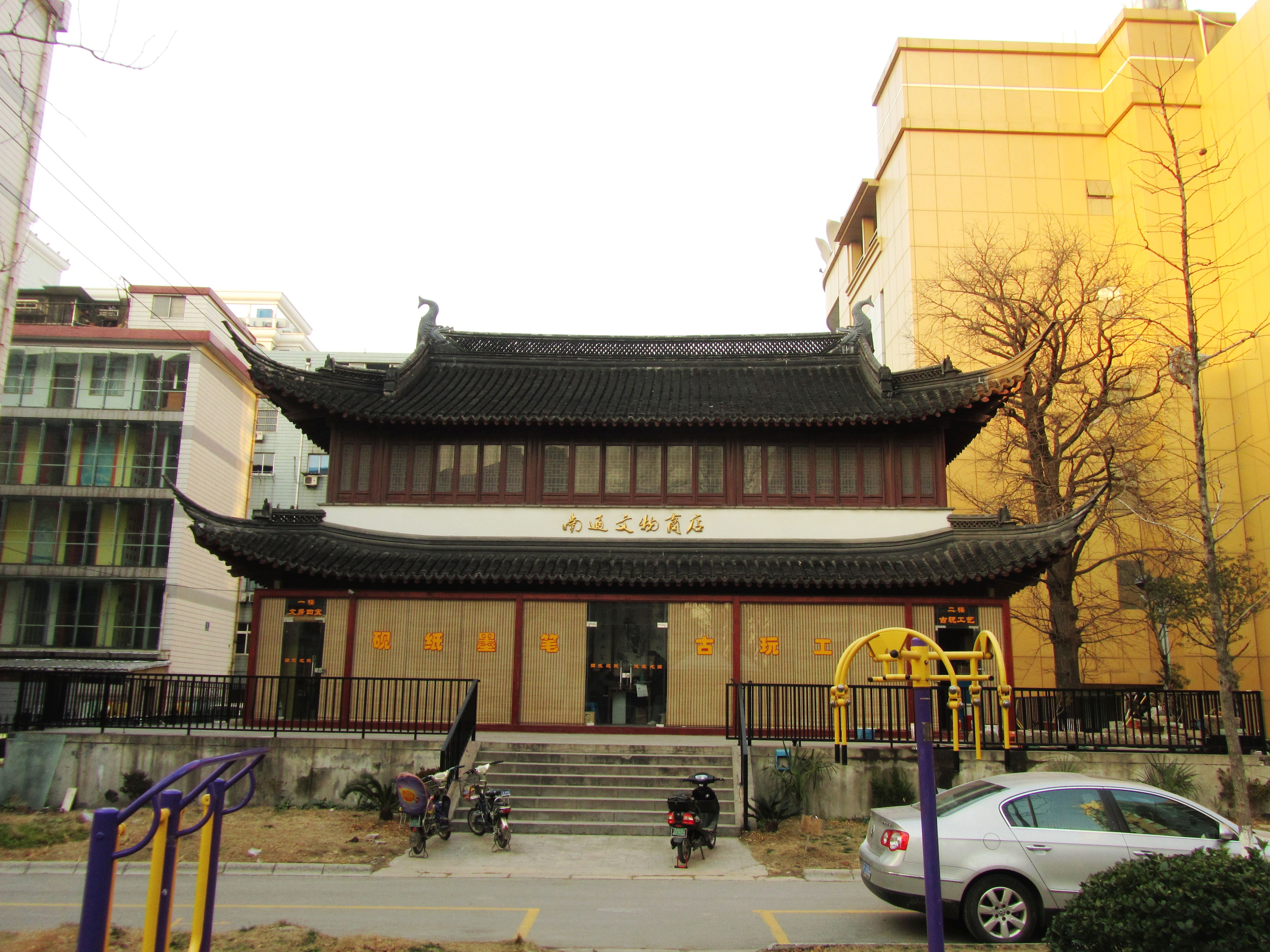
Xuanmiao Temple, a Song dynasty architectural relic built in 1009, located in Chongchuan District.

By the 9th century, Langshan—then an offshore island—had emerged as a strategic military outpost along the lower Yangtze River. In 875, a mutiny was launched there by Wang Ying, a junior officer under the Zhenhai Military Governor. His forces rapidly grew to about 10,000 men, who used ships to raid southeastern coastal regions.

Following the rebellion's suppression, the area became the base of the Yao clan, who commanded a local population engaged in fishing and salt production. The clan maintained a considerable private army and established a fortified settlement. The Yao leader accepted the Southern Tang title: Military Commissioner (制置使) of Jinghai (靜海). In 956, he led thousands of followers across the Yangtze to submit to the Wuyue.

The area was elevated to the status of a military prefecture later, and was reorganized as Tongzhou in 960. Between 1023 and 1032, the prefecture was briefly renamed Chongzhou (崇州) before reverting to its original name. During the Song period, the government established the Lifeng Salt Directorate there, while Langshan developed into a regional center for Buddhist activities centered around the Guangjiao Temple.

In the mid-16th century, the Ming dynasty stationed a deputy regional commander at Langshan to defend against wokou pirates. During the Qing dynasty, this post was elevated to a regional commander (zongbing). As a senior military officer, he led the Langshan Garrison and commanded a naval fleet responsible for the coastal defense of northern Jiangsu.

For most of its imperial history, Tongzhou was administratively under the jurisdiction of Yangzhou and was elevated to an independent department (zhilizhou) in 1725, a status it retained until 1912, when it was renamed Nantong to distinguish it from its namesake near Beijing following the administrative reforms of the Republic of China. Following the re-emergence of its southern coastal territory, Haimen was formally re-established as an independent sub-prefecture (zhiliting) in 1768.

=== Modern era ===
Historically a major center for salt production, the Nantong region transformed economically in the nineteenth century as the salt trade declined due to fiscal reforms and coastal environmental changes. Cotton cultivation proved particularly well suited to local conditions, and by the early twentieth century Nantong had become one of the principal producers of high-quality cotton in Jiangsu province.

In 1895, local scholar-official Zhang Jian founded the Dasheng (Dah Sun) Cotton Mill, initiating the region's industrialization. Despite relying on government loans and machinery, Zhang maintained Dasheng as a merchant-managed (shangban) firm, successfully resisting direct bureaucratic control.

By the early 20th century, Nantong was a major industrial center ranking third nationally in cotton mill spindles by 1913. The region's modernization, spearheaded by Zhang Jian and centered on the Dasheng enterprises system, produced a distinctive "mixed" industrial model.

Large-scale machine spinning was concentrated in urban factories, while weaving remained largely in the hands of rural households using traditional looms. This pattern has been described by scholars as a form of economic "involution" (neijuan): modernization in the urban core coexisted with persistent subsistence farming and labor‑intensive handicraft production in the surrounding countryside. Nantong's modern industrial system was therefore heavily dependent on rural handweaving.

In 1901 Zhang obtained official permission to bypass restrictions on private coastal reclamation and founded the Tonghai Land Reclamation Company. By 1905 the company had expanded to 8,382 hectares (20,710 acres) across large parts of Nantong and Haimen counties. At the same time, farmland became increasingly fragmented. Surveys show that the average plot cultivated by tenant farmers in Nantong county declined from about 1.27 hectares (3.1 acres) in 1905 to 1.00 hectare (2.5 acres) in 1914 and 0.79 hectares (2.0 acres) by 1924.

Zhang Jian's elder brother, Zhang Cha (張詧), co‑managed the Dasheng enterprises and led the Tong‑Chong‑Hai General Chamber of Cotton Commerce (GCCC), which linked local merchants with commercial elites in Shanghai and Nanjing, organized an affiliated agricultural association and merchant militia, and, after the 1911 Revolution, coordinated with Shanghai revolutionaries to establish a local military government.

By around 1910, the regional economy revolved around the Dasheng enterprise system of cotton mills, steamship companies, and processing plants. In parallel with this industrial expansion, Zhang Jian developed a comprehensive local educational system, from kindergartens to the multi-disciplinary Nantong College, and founded social service institutions including a hospital, an orphanage, and facilities for the disabled. Public infrastructure expanded to encompass a library, a museum, and several parks, helping to establish Nantong as an early model of planned urban modernization.

In the late 1920s, before the Nationalist "purge" fully reached north of the Yangtze, the rural borderlands of Nantong, Rugao, and Taixing briefly became an early Communist base area, known as Tong-Hai-Ru-Tai. The Fourteenth Red Army, composed largely of local peasants, was established with its headquarters in Rugao. However, by 1931, the base was eliminated due to superior Nationalist military forces and internal defections.

Before the Mukden Incident of 1931, rural households in the Nantong region (including present-day Nantong, Haimen, and Chongming) sold about 200,000 bolts of handwoven cloth (tubu) yearly to Northeast China, but after the Japanese occupation of the area and the influx of cheap machine‑woven textiles, this export trade collapsed, pushing many rural weavers into poverty and triggering a crisis for Nantong's urban cotton mills.

On 17 August 1937, Japanese naval aircraft bombed Nantong. One of the targets was the Nantungchow Christian Hospital, of the United Christian Missionary Society, where 24 Chinese were killed. Despite sworn testimony that Japanese aircraft flew low and machine-gunned the mission compound, the Japanese government, in response to American protests, denied the bombing was "deliberate". After occupying Nantong on 17 March 1938, Japanese troops carried out "mopping-up" operations, burning dwellings and targeting civilians, including children.

Under Japanese occupation, local industries were co‑opted into the war economy. The Dasheng mills initially sought to evade seizure by registering as a German company, but the strategy failed, and the Japanese military seized the mills for war production under the Kanegafuchi Company. Though ostensibly returned to Chinese ownership in 1943, the damaged mills continued to operate through cooperation with Japanese and collaborationist Nanjing authorities.

In the spring of 1946, during General Marshall's mediation, an incident known as the "Nantong Tragedy" (南通慘案) occurred. When residents attempted to contact Executive Headquarters Truce Team 17, local Nationalist authorities suppressed them, allegedly carrying out extrajudicial killings that drew national attention.

In late 1948, despite the Nationalist's appeal to relocate Dasheng's textile mills to Taiwan, the company's textile operations ultimately remained in Nantong. After the Communist takeover of the city in February 1949, these three mills accounted for 78% of Nantong's private industrial output for the year, at a time when private firms as a whole still produced 99.2% of the region's total industrial output.

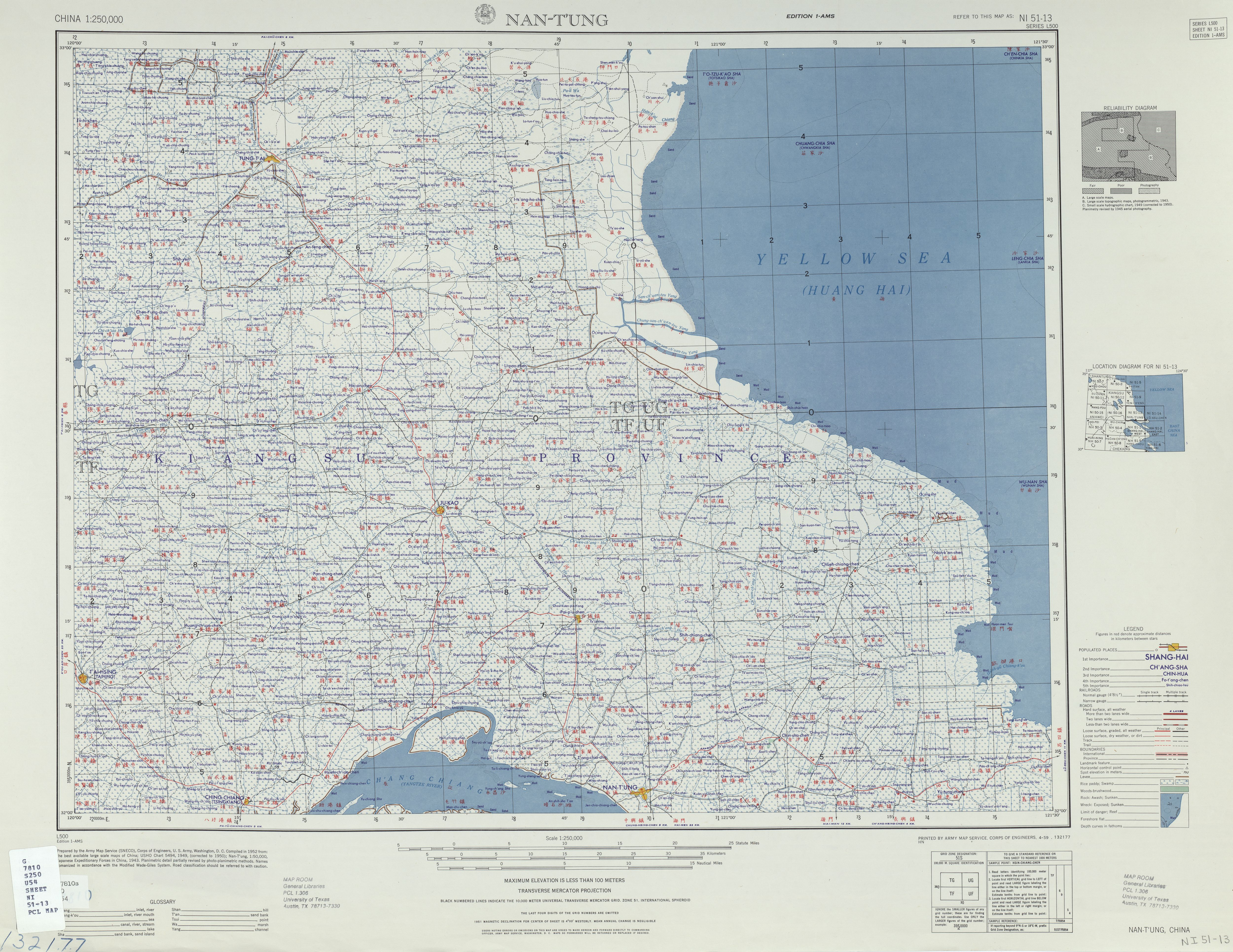
Nantong (labeled NAN-T'UNG 南通) (1952)

=== Contemporary Development ===
In 1958, Nantong City was placed under the jurisdiction of the Nantong Prefecture, while Chongming County was transferred from the prefecture to Shanghai. Nantong City became a province-administered city in 1962, and with the subsequent abolition of the Nantong Region in 1983, its six counties were incorporated into the municipality.

In 1984, the State Council designated Nantong as one of China's fourteen open coastal cities. Historically, Nantong adopted the Township and Village Enterprise (TVE) model; by 1983, its number of TVEs was second only to Suzhou within Jiangsu. By 1996, the city had developed a substantial textile industry and a significant foreign-invested sector.

Although Nantong joined the Shanghai Economic Belt (later the Yangtze River Delta) in 1982, it lacked a direct land connection to Shanghai until the 2000s, with access relying on a three-hour ferry. The completion of the Nanjing–Qidong Railway, the Sutong Yangtze River Bridge and the Shanghai–Chongming–Nantong Bridge–Tunnel significantly strengthened Nantong's transport links with the southern Yangtze River Delta.

== Geography ==
Nantong
- Chinese: 南通
- Postal: Nantung
- Literal meaning: southern passage
Transcriptions
Standard Mandarin
- Hanyu Pinyin: Nántōng
- Wade–Giles: Nan^{2}-t'ung^{1}
Wu
- Romanization: noe^{平}thon^{平}
Yue: Cantonese
- Jyutping: naam^{4}tung^{1}

Tongzhou
- Chinese: 通州
- Postal: Tungchow
Transcriptions
Standard Mandarin
- Hanyu Pinyin: Tōngzhōu
- Wade–Giles: T'ung^{1}-chou^{1}

Located in central Jiangsu province, Nantong occupies the northern bank of the Yangtze River estuary, bordered by the Yellow Sea to the east and the Yangtze River to the south. The region's geomorphology consists primarily of alluvial deposits and forms a significant part of the Yangtze River Delta plain. Apart from isolated bedrock outcrops such as Langshan Hill, the terrain is predominantly flat.

The historical formation of the area is characterized by extensive deltaic accretion and the development of sandbanks. The southeastern territories, including Haimen and Qidong, were incorporated into the landmass around the 19th century. The hydrological network is dense, belonging to the Yangtze and Huai River systems. While terrestrial mineral resources are limited, the municipality possesses an extensive coastline and substantial intertidal mudflats.

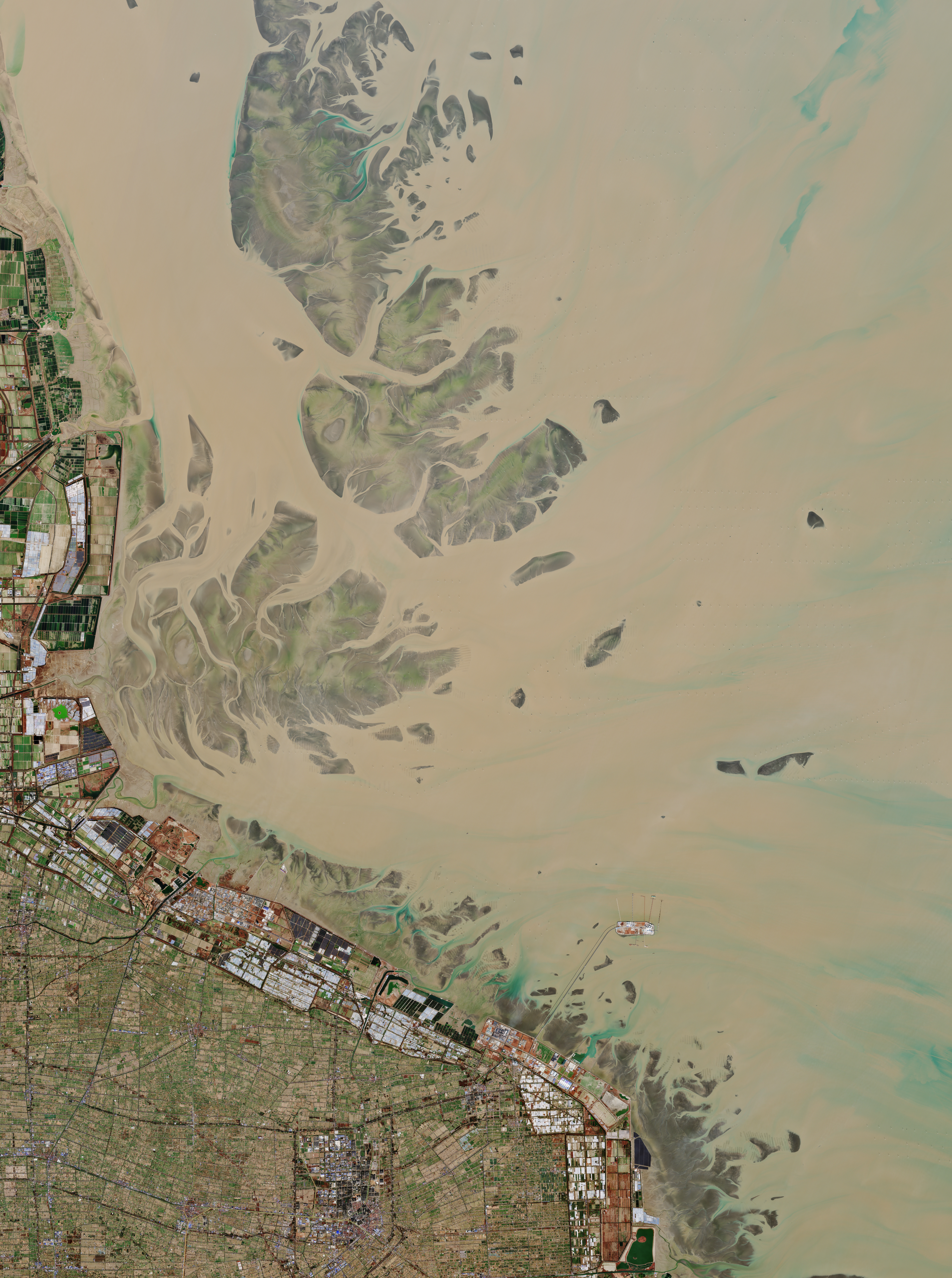
Offshore wind farms, aquaculture, and solar installations along the Rudong coastline. The coastal water is colored by Yangtze River sediment. Credit: ESA/Copernicus Sentinel-2 (2025) – CC BY-SA IGO 3.0

=== Climate ===
Nantong has a humid subtropical climate (Köppen Cfa), with four distinct seasons. Winters are chilly and damp, and cold northwesterly winds caused by the Siberian high can force temperatures to fall below freezing at night although snowfall is relatively uncommon. Summers are hot and humid, and downpours or freak thunderstorms often occur. Monthly daily average temperatures range from 3.6 °C (38.5 °F) in January to 27.9 °C (82.2 °F) in July, and the annual mean is 16.2 °C (61.2 °F). With the plum rains in June and early July comes the rainiest part of the year.

Climate data for Nantong, elevation 5 m (16 ft), (1991–2020 normals, extremes 1952–present)
Month	Jan	Feb	Mar	Apr	May	Jun	Jul	Aug	Sep	Oct	Nov	Dec	Year
Record high °C (°F)	20.1 (68.2)	25.3 (77.5)	33.1 (91.6)	33.3 (91.9)	34.8 (94.6)	36.4 (97.5)	38.7 (101.7)	40.0 (104.0)	38.5 (101.3)	32.2 (90.0)	27.3 (81.1)	22.6 (72.7)	40.0 (104.0)
Mean daily maximum °C (°F)	7.4 (45.3)	9.6 (49.3)	14.0 (57.2)	20.1 (68.2)	25.4 (77.7)	28.2 (82.8)	32.0 (89.6)	31.7 (89.1)	27.8 (82.0)	22.8 (73.0)	16.8 (62.2)	10.2 (50.4)	20.5 (68.9)
Daily mean °C (°F)	3.6 (38.5)	5.3 (41.5)	9.3 (48.7)	14.9 (58.8)	20.3 (68.5)	24.0 (75.2)	28.0 (82.4)	27.7 (81.9)	23.7 (74.7)	18.3 (64.9)	12.5 (54.5)	6.1 (43.0)	16.1 (61.1)
Mean daily minimum °C (°F)	0.7 (33.3)	2.1 (35.8)	5.6 (42.1)	10.7 (51.3)	16.2 (61.2)	20.8 (69.4)	25.0 (77.0)	24.8 (76.6)	20.5 (68.9)	14.8 (58.6)	8.9 (48.0)	2.8 (37.0)	12.7 (54.9)
Record low °C (°F)	−9.6 (14.7)	−10.8 (12.6)	−3.9 (25.0)	−0.7 (30.7)	5.5 (41.9)	12.8 (55.0)	15.6 (60.1)	16.5 (61.7)	9.9 (49.8)	3.4 (38.1)	−2.8 (27.0)	−8.9 (16.0)	−10.8 (12.6)
Average precipitation mm (inches)	55.8 (2.20)	50.7 (2.00)	73.1 (2.88)	72.8 (2.87)	83.9 (3.30)	209.1 (8.23)	195.7 (7.70)	183.9 (7.24)	102.9 (4.05)	59.5 (2.34)	55.4 (2.18)	37.4 (1.47)	1,180.2 (46.46)
Average precipitation days (≥ 0.1 mm)	9.4	9.1	10.8	10.0	10.7	12.7	12.8	11.9	9.2	7.0	8.4	7.2	119.2
Average snowy days	2.6	2.0	0.7	0	0	0	0	0	0	0	0.2	0.7	6.2
Average relative humidity (%)	76	76	75	74	75	81	82	83	81	76	76	73	77
Mean monthly sunshine hours	131.3	126.6	152.0	176.9	184.0	133.0	183.0	196.1	167.8	167.7	141.0	144.5	1,903.9
Percentage possible sunshine	41	40	41	45	43	31	42	48	46	48	45	46	43
Source 1: China Meteorological Administration all-time extreme temperature
Source 2: Weather China

== Culture ==
- Xuanmiao Temple, structure built during the Song era.
- Nantong Museum

== Language ==
Nantong city and its six counties (or county-level cities) are rich in linguistic diversity, featuring both important Northern Wu varieties and highly divergent dialects of Mandarin (see Nantong dialect). People in the city of Nantong speak a unique dialect which sounds nothing like standard Mandarin or any other dialect, and it also holds distinctive differences from surrounding dialects.

About 2 million people in the southern parts of Tongzhou, Haimen, and Qidong speak the Wu language, the specific local variety of which is often referred to as "Qi-hai Hua" (启海话), meaning Qidong-Haimen speech. It is about the same as the dialect spoken on the neighbouring island of Chongming, Shanghai. People in northern parts of these counties speak the "Tongdong dialect" (Chinese: 通东话; pinyin: Tōngdōnghuà; lit. 'Eastern Tong Talk'. People in Rugao, Hai'an speak other dialects.

== Tourism ==
The Hao River, known as the Emerald Necklace of Nantong, surrounds the city with a total length of 15 km (9.3 mi). Most city scenery lines this river.

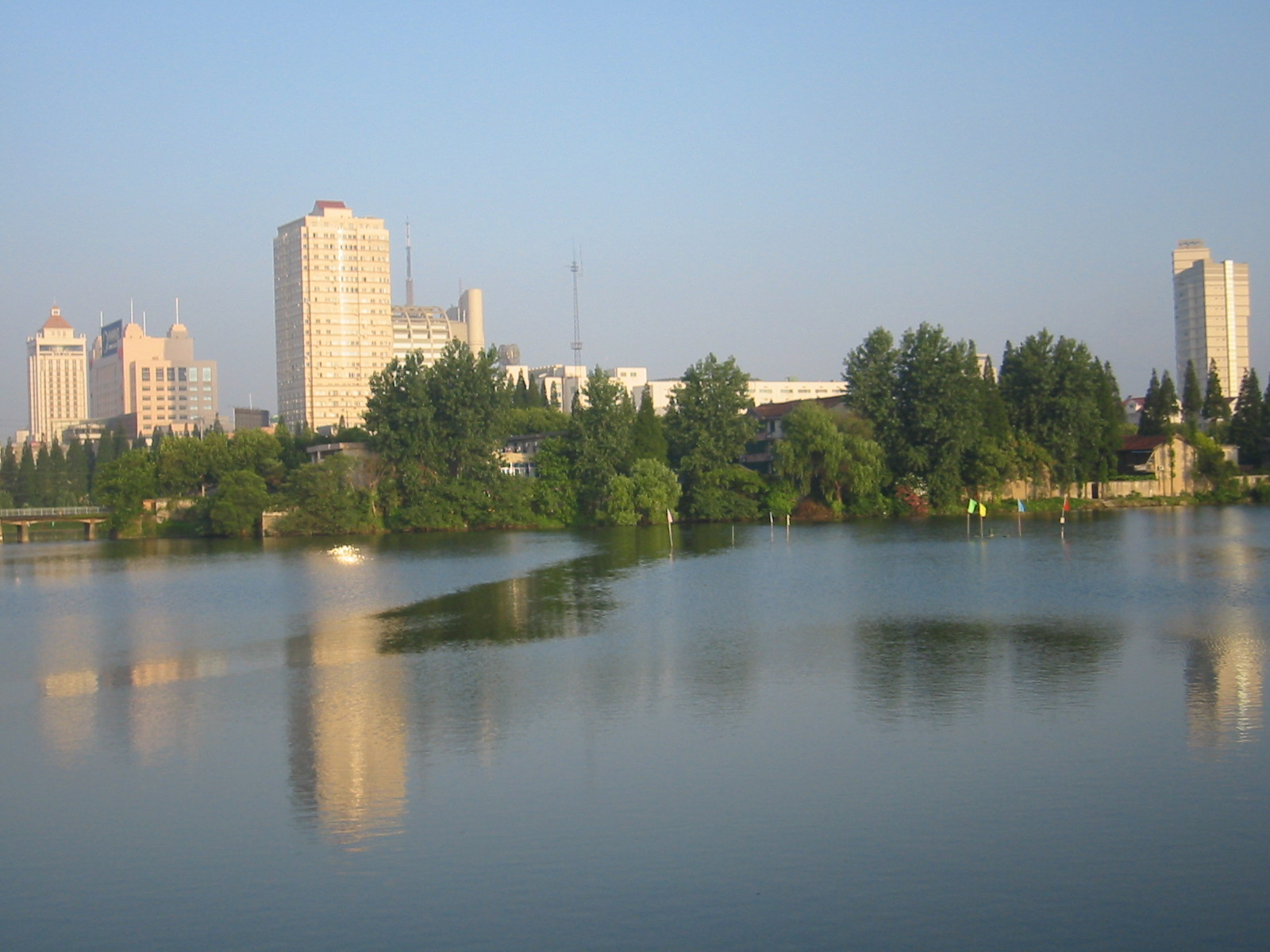
Nantong skyline seen behind the river Hao

Popular tourist sites include Langshan ("Wolf Hill"), which is around 110 meters high. On top of the hill is a Buddhist temple dedicated to a Song dynasty monk. Because of the monk's legendary powers over water demons, sailors pray to him for protection on their voyages.

The Cao Gong Zhu Memorial Temple commemorates a local hero who defended the city against Japanese pirates in 1557.

Shuihuiyuan Garden, meaning Water Garden, is unique of all Chinese classical gardens due its creation in the Hui style. It includes the tombs of several people, such as Luo Binwang, a poet of the Tang dynasty; Wen Tianxiang, the national hero of the Nansong dynasty; and Zhang Jian, the scholar of the late Qing dynasty, who was a modern industrialist and supporter of education.

== Economy ==
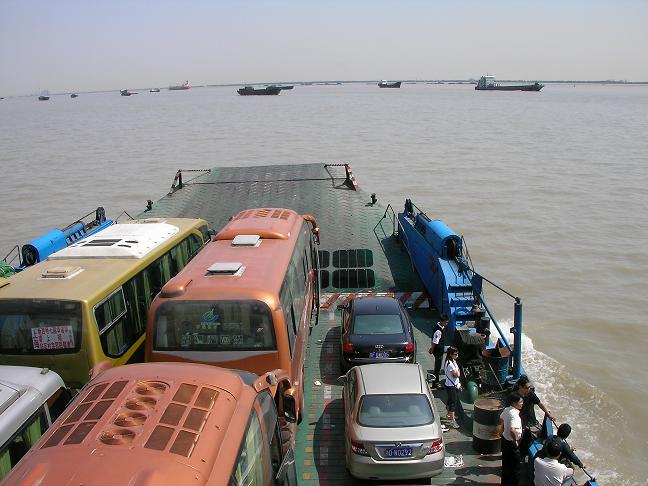
Ferry on Yangtze River near Nantong

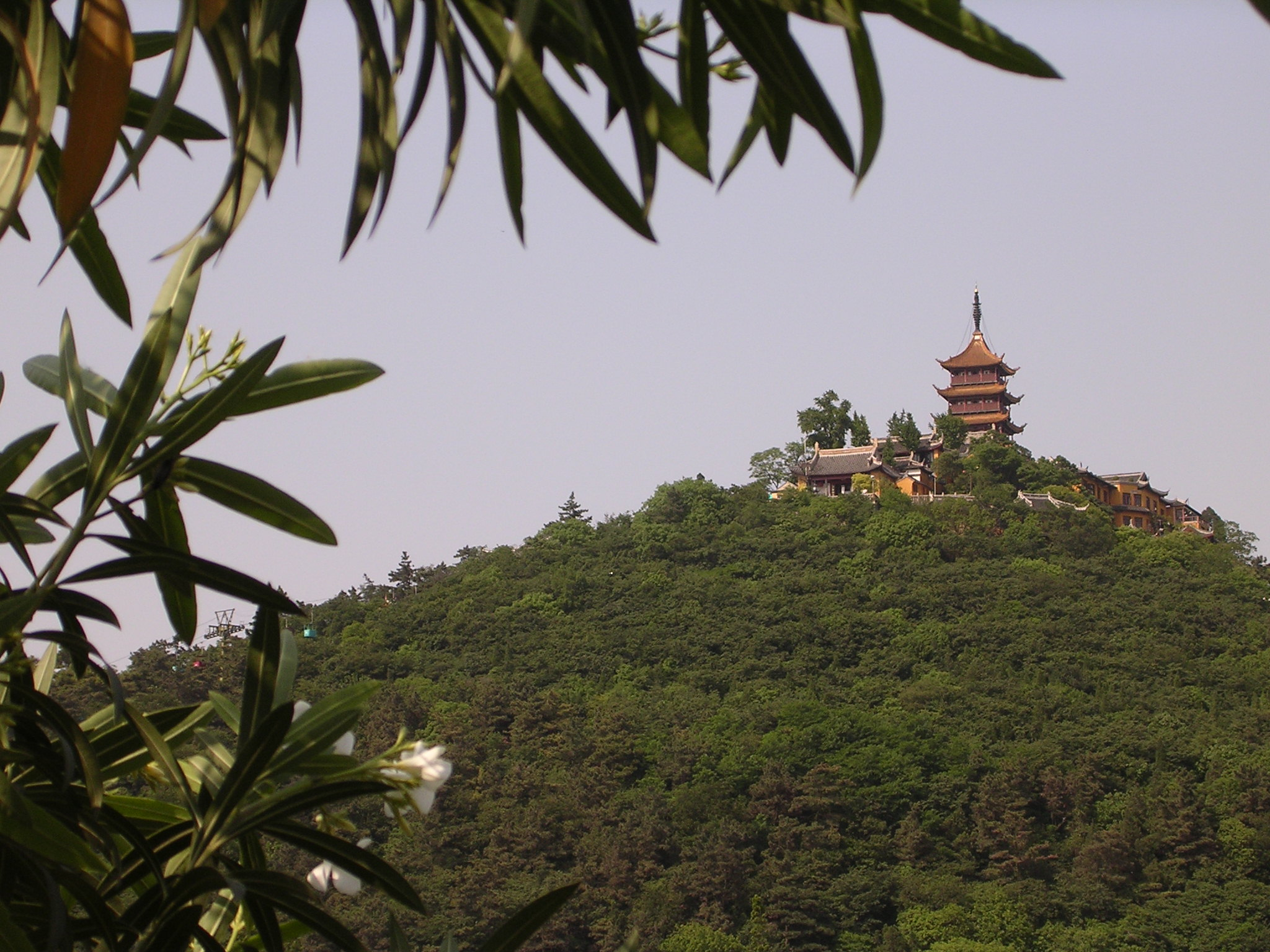
View of Guangxiao Temple and Wolf Hill, Chongchuan District

Nantong has developed rapidly in the last 25 years, as have most of the cities in the Yangtze River Delta. Nantong's rapid economic growth is generally attributed to its advantageous location just north of Shanghai. Nantong's Sutong Bridge is expected to further Nantong's integration with Shanghai, cutting transportation time between the cities down from three hours to one hour.

The shipping corporation Cosco has a large port and ship repair yard on the river. Cosco (Nantong) Shipyard Co., Ltd, the first shipyard of the Cosco group, has placed itself adjacent to the busy port of Nantong. The yard has 1120 m of coastline and is equipped with one cape-size and one panamax size floating dock. Cosco Shipyard handles approximately 150 vessels per year. Nantong Mingde Heavy Industries originally operated a shipyard in Nantong, but declared bankruptcy in 2014. Minde's parent company, Jiangsu Sainty Marine Corporation, would cease operations in 2017.

Some companies in Nantong:

- Empire Clothing Co. Ltd. – Manufacturer of garments for men, women and children. Products gallery.
- Nantong No.2 Yarn-dyed Weaving Mill – Cloth and garment manufacturer.
- Nantong Taierte Clothing Co. Ltd. – Textile production and processing.
- Nantong Freezing Equipment Factory – Refrigeration and quick freezing equipment for the food industry.
- Nantong Printing and Dyeing Co. Ltd. – Textile processor. Product specifications.
- Nantong Suzhong Textile Co. Ltd. – Yarn and thread manufacturer. Product specifications.
- Nantong General Pharmaceutical Factory – Manufacturer of pharmaceutical materials such as tablets, capsules and injections. Product specifications.
- Nantong Xiaoxing Transformer Co., Ltd. -Various range of electric transformers
- Nantong Fujitsu Microelectronics Co Ltd

== Industrial zones ==
=== Nantong Binhai Park ===
Established in January 2012 according to State-level development zone standards, Nantong Binhai Park is under the direct governance and significant investment of the Nantong Municipality. Benefiting from favorable policies, the park spans an expansive land area of 820 km^{2} (320 sq mi).

Situated 50 km (31 mi) east of Nantong's downtown area, it is conveniently located within a 1.5-hour drive from Shanghai Pudong and Hongqiao airports. Binhai Park boasts excellent transportation infrastructure, with access to key expressways linking Tongyang to Nantong downtown, Haiqi to Qidong and Shanghai Pudong, as well as seaports featuring 500 berths ranging from 50,000 tons to 300,000 tons in the Tongzhou Bay port cluster.

The industries in Binhai Park primarily focus on maritime and offshore activities, logistics, equipment manufacturing, new energy, advanced materials, electronics, and more.

=== Nantong Economic & Technological Development Area ===
Established in 1984, Nantong Economic & Technological Development Area (NETDA, 南通经济技术开发区) was one of the first state-level development zones approved by the Chinese Central Government and has been certified as an ISO 14000 National Demonstration Zone. The zone benefits from superior transportation facilities by both rail and road. NETDA has direct links to two railways: the Xinyi-Changxing Railway and the Nanjing-Qidong Railway. Su-Tong Yangtze River Bridge feeds into the center of NETDA and connects the Nanjing-Nantong and Yancheng-Nantong Expressways to the north, and Shanghai-Nanjing and Suzhou-Jiaxing-Hangzhou Expressways and Riverside Expressways to the south.

NETDA includes several subsidiary zones including Nantong Export Processing Zone, New Material Park, Opto-mechatronics Industrial Park and NETDA Business Park. Special incentives are offered for investments in areas of modern equipment manufacturing, such as in new materials, engineering, fine chemicals, new medicines, new energy and modern services. At present, NETDA has attracted a large number of renowned companies to settle in Nantong, such as Vonnex Allied IT Services, OJI Paper, Maxion, Johnson Controls, ITOCHU, TSRC Corporation, and Merck KGaA.

=== China-Singapore Suzhou Science and Technology Park ===
Established in 2009, China-Singapore Suzhou STP is one of the key projects of Jiangsu Province coastal development. It's also a joint-venture park between Suzhou and Nantong, linking them on either side of the Yangtze River. The intended area is 50 km^{2} (19 sq mi) and is to be developed in three phases. It claims the project as "An International Enterprise Park and Eco-friendly City in Yangtze Delta".

=== Nantong Export Processing Zone ===
Nantong Export Processing Zone (NTEPZ) is situated in the Nantong Economic and Technological Development Area with a planned area of 2.98 km^{2} (1.15 sq mi). The Tong-Qi canal marks its western and northern boundaries, with Dongfang Avenue and Fuxin Road its eastern and southern boundaries respectively. NTPEZ is located at a communication hub, adjoining the main coastal artery of communications between north and south, close to the estuary of the Yangtze River, only 8 kilometers to the Su(Suzhou)-Tong(Nangtong) Changjiang Bridge.

== Administration ==
The prefecture-level city of Nantong administers seven county-level divisions, including three districts, three county-level cities, and one county.

These are further divided into 146 township-level divisions.

Administrative divisions of Nantong
Subdivision	Chinese (S)	Pinyin	Postal	Population (2020 census)	Area (km^{2})	Density (/km^{2})
Chongchuan District	崇川区	Chóngchuān Qū	226000	1,516,013	564.1	2,687
Tongzhou District	通州区	Tōngzhōu Qū	226300	1,258,739	1,432	879.0
Haimen District	海门区	Hǎimén Qū	226100	991,782	1,138	871.5
Rural
Rudong County	如东县	Rúdōng Xiàn	226400	880,006	2,252	390.8
Satellite cities (County-level cities)
Qidong City	启东市	Qǐdōng Shì	226200	972,525	1,714.59	567.21
Rugao City	如皋市	Rúgāo Shì	226500	1,238,448	1,579	784.3
Hai'an City	海安市	Hǎi'ān Shì	226600	874,334	1,152	759.0
Total				7,726,635	9,802	788.3

- Defunct – Gangzha District has been promoted to Gangzha Economic Development Zone (Gangzha Jingji Kaifa Qu – 港闸经济开发区) at the provincial level.

== Transportation ==
=== Air ===
Nantong Xingdong International Airport, located in the town of Xingdong in Tongzhou District, 9.8 kilometers northeast of city center and 120 kilometers from Shanghai, serves Nantong and its neighboring areas. The construction of terminal 2 was completed in 2014, marking an important step towards serving international flights, the first of which took place on 26 May 2023, to Hong Kong.

=== Road ===
Nantong has two bridges across the Yangtze to the south. The Chongming–Qidong Yangtze River Bridge, completed in 2011, carries the G40 Shanghai–Xi'an Expressway from Qidong to Chongming Island. The Sutong Yangtze River Bridge, which carries the G15 Shenyang–Haikou Expressway from Nantong to Changshu, was completed in 2008 and is one of the longest cable-stayed bridges in the world.

=== Rail ===
The Nanjing-Qidong (Ningqi) and Xinyi-Changxing (Xinchang) railways intersect at Hai'an in the northwestern part of Nantong Prefecture. The Nantong–Shanghai railway opened in 2020 with the Hutong Yangtze River Bridge and provides a link south to Suzhou and Shanghai.

Currently, Nantong Railway station and Hai'An railway station have the highest train volume in the city. Due to the single-track nature of the Nanjing-Qidong railway east of Nantong railway station, Electrified Multiple Unit service are not available beyond Nantong railway station; Qidong railway station currently receives 4 round trip trains per day operated as "K" trains. A line from Hai'an also connects Rudong county to the national rail network, with daily departures bounding for Nanjing.

The first line of the Nantong Metro opened in 2022.

== Education ==
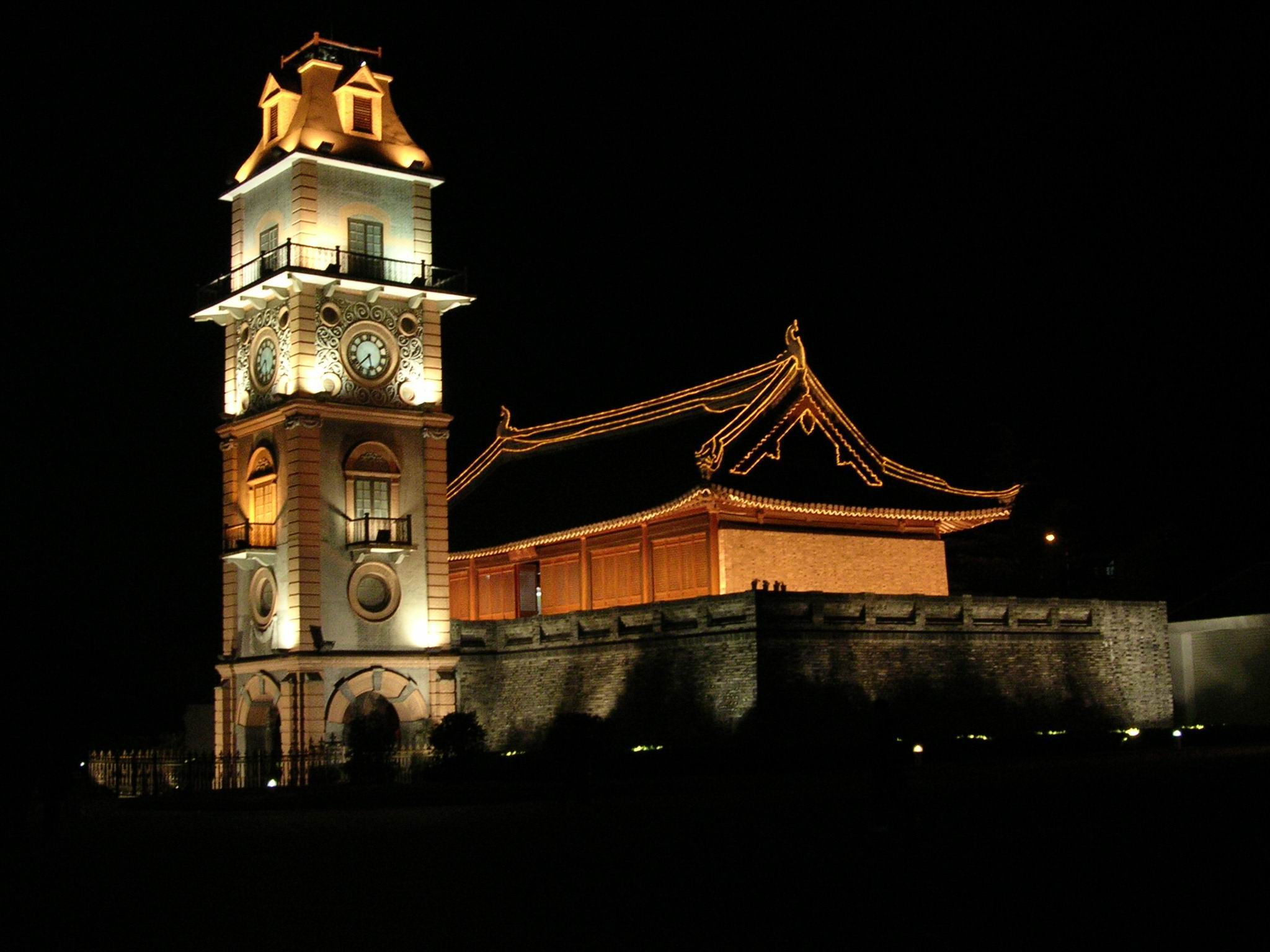
The bell tower in the campus of Nantong Middle School

Nantong hosts a comprehensive university, Nantong University (made by the merger of the former Nantong Medical College, former Nantong Normal College, and former Nantong Engineer College). It includes 21 schools and had around 22,000 registered students in 2007.

Nantong has contributed to China's educational development with several firsts: establishment of the first school for teacher training, the first folk museum (Nantong Museum), the first school for industrial textile manufacturing, the first school for embroidery, the first drama school, and the first school for the deaf and the blind.

Zhang Jian founded the first normal school in modern China, Nantong Normal College. Zhang also founded museums, libraries, and theaters, making Nantong into an important cultural center.

- Secondary schools (incomplete list):
  - Nantong Middle School
  - Nantong No.1 Middle School
- Universities and colleges:
  - Nantong University
- International Schools
  - Nantong Stalford International School http://en.ntsis.com/

== Social Welfare Institute ==
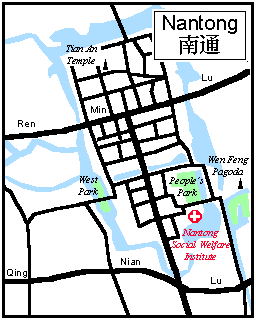
Location of Nantong Social Welfare Institute

Established in 1906, Nantong Social Welfare Institute was originally created by Zhang Jian as a house for orphans, the aged, and the disabled.

Located on the banks of the Haohe, the site of the institute has an area of 13.2 mu (8,800 m^{2}). At present, there are 79 staff members who care for around 170 orphans, widows, and disabled children, plus 70 retirees. Since 1952, Nantong Social Welfare Institute has adopted more than 16,000 elderly, orphaned and disabled children.

== Notable people ==
- Zhang Jian (born 1853), entrepreneur, politician and educator
- Gu Xiulian (born 1936), politician who served as Governor of Jiangsu, Minister of Chemical Industry, and in other senior government roles
- Henry Lee (born 1938), Chinese-American forensic scientist and biochemist
- Fan Zeng (born 1938), painter, calligrapher and poet
- Ding Xuexiang (born 1962), member of Politburo Standing Committee and Vice Premier
- Ge Jun (born 1964), college and university professor
- Chen Ruolin (born 1992), platform diver and coach
- Shi Yuqi (born 1996), World Champion and World Number One badminton player

== See also ==
- List of twin towns and sister cities in China
- Chinese ship Nantong

== Sources ==
- Köll, Elisabeth (2003). From Cotton Mill to Business Empire: The Emergence of Regional Enterprises in Modern China. Harvard East Asian Monographs. Cambridge, Mass: Harvard University Asia Center. ISBN 978-0-674-01394-0.
- Shao, Qin (2004). Culturing Modernity: The Nantong Model, 1890-1930. Stanford, Calif: Stanford University Press. ISBN 978-0-8047-4689-2.
- Shiroyama, Tomoko (2009). China During the Great Depression: Market, State, and the World Economy, 1929-1937. Harvard East Asian Monographs. Cambridge, MA: Harvard University Asia Center. ISBN 978-0-674-03617-8.
- Teng, Ssu-yü; Fairbank, John King (1979). China's Response to the West: A Documentary Survey, 1839-1923. Cambridge, Mass: Harvard University Press. ISBN 978-0-674-12025-9.
- Huang, Philip C. (1990). The peasant family and rural development in the Yangzi Delta, 1350-1988. Stanford, Calif: Stanford University Press. ISBN 978-0-8047-1787-8.
