= Chahe =

Chahe may refer to the following locations in China:

- Chahe Township (岔河乡), in Eshan County, Yunnan
- Chahe Subdistrict (汊河街道), Yangzhou, Jiangsu

== Towns ==
- Chahe, Anhui (汊河), in Lai'an County, Anhui
- Chahe, Qixingguan District (岔河), Bijie, Guizhou
- Chahe, Weining County (岔河), Bijie, Guizhou
- Chahe, Hainan (叉河), in Changjiang County, Hainan
- Chahe, Hebei (岔河), in Tangshan, Hebei
- Chahe, Hubei (汊河), in Honghu, Hubei
- Chahe, Huai'an (岔河), in Huai'an, Jiangsu
- Chahe, Pizhou (岔河), in Pizhou, Jiangsu
- Chahe, Rudong County (岔河), in Rudong County, Jiangsu
- Chahe, Sichuan (茶河), in Xuanhan County, Sichuan

== See also ==
- Chah (disambiguation)
