= Hongze =

Hongze, sometimes spelled Hungtse, may refer to:

- Lake Hongze, lake in Jiangsu Province, China
- Hongze County, in Jiangsu Province, China
