= Sanhe, Jiangsu =

Sanhe 三河镇
- Town
- Location in Jiangsu
- Coordinates: 33°7′30″N 118°48′3″E
- Country: People's Republic of China
- Province: Jiangsu
- Prefecture-level city: Huai'an
- District: Hongze District
- Time zone: UTC+8 (China Standard)

Sanhe (Chinese: 三河; pinyin: Sānhé) is a town under the administration of Hongze District, Huai'an, Jiangsu, China. As of 2018, it has 4 residential communities and 15 villages under its administration.
