= Jiangsu-Hong Kong Personnel Training Cooperation Programme =

Jiangsu-Hong Kong Personnel Training Cooperation Programme (2004–2013), the biggest of its kind in the history of Jiangsu, is an initiative by the government of Jiangsu's Personnel Department to send over 1,000 professionals to Hong Kong each year for training. By 2013, over 10,000 professionals from Jiangsu would have benefited from the most advanced professional and technical expertise that top universities and training institutions in Hong Kong have to offer through the training programme.

By 2008, for the first four years since the implementation of the training programme 4,850 people have received training in Hong Kong in more than 70 professional fields, including major service sectors such as accounting, finance, securities and auditing. The trainees come from different trades and professions in Jiangsu. Also, the scope of training has been extended from modern services to various sectors relating to economic and social development. More than ten new professional fields have been added, including housing planning; airport operation, management and control; hotel management; corporate financing and listing; information services; construction engineering consultancy; and volunteer community work. The programme currently covers over 100 fields, and the trainees range from personnel in the service sectors to specialised personnel of all kinds.

== See also ==
- Government of Hong Kong
- Universities of Hong Kong
