= Chah =

CHAH, or Chah may refer to:

- Council of Heads of Australasian Herbaria or CHAH
- Ajahn Chah, a Thai Buddhist monk (1918-1992)
- CHAH (AM), a multicultural radio station in Edmonton, Alberta
- Chah, Zanskar, a village in the Himalayan region of Ladakh, India

== See also ==
- Chahe (disambiguation)
