= Huangqiao High School =

- 南师大附属扬子中学
- Jiangsu; China

Information
- Type: Public
- Established: 1924
- Principal: Zhang Xiaoli (张晓莉)
- Classes: 62
- Campus size: 70,000 m^{2} (750,000 sq ft)

HuangQiao High School was set up in 1924 and became an important high school in Jiangsu Province, China, in 1996. It became one of the four-star high schools in Jiangsu Province in 2004. The school covers an area of about 70,000 square meters and has 62 classes, with 3,300 students, five Jiangsu Province special-grade teachers, and 86 head teachers.

== Honour ==
In recent years, the school has been named "Model of Taizhou School", "Civilized Unit of Jiangsu Province", and "Advanced collective of mass sports in China". It has been praised by the national and provincial governments more than 40 times. Several students are admitted by Qinghua University or Beijing University each year.
