= Baochang High School =

School in Jiangsu, China

- Chinese: 江苏省包场高级中学/ 江蘇省包場高級中學

Information
- Established: 1956; 70 years ago
- Faculty: 221
- Enrollment: 2596

Baochang High School (simplified Chinese: 江苏省包场高级中学; traditional Chinese: 江蘇省包場高級中學) is a high school in Jiangsu, China.

== History ==
The school was founded in April 1956 and is located in the south-east of Jiangsu, east of the Yellow Sea and south of the Yangtze River. It covers an area of 130,392.5 square meters with a province-class body art museum, science and technology buildings, laboratory, office and classroom buildings, among 22 other main buildings and teaching facilities. There are currently 49 classrooms, 2596 enrolled students, and 221 faculty.

The school has become a Nanjing Art Institute experimental base and provides students for the Nanjing University of Aeronautics and Astronautics. It became the No. 124 school in 2000, No. 90 in 2001, and No. 71 in 2002.

== Notable alumni ==
- Ji Yunshi, governor of Hubei province.
