= Xuyi High School =

- Traditional Chinese: 江蘇省盱眙中學
- Simplified Chinese: 江苏省盱眙中学
Transcriptions
Standard Mandarin
- Hanyu Pinyin: Jiāngsū Shěng Xūyí Zhōngxué
- Wade–Giles: Chiang1-su1 Sheng3 Hsiu1-i2 Chung1-hsueh2
Yue: Cantonese
- Jyutping: Gei1so1saang3 Heoi1ji4 Zung1hok6
- Huaian, Jiangsu; China

Information
- Former name: Anhui Provincial No. 9 High School (Chinese: 安徽省立第九中学)
- Established: 1920
- Website: jsxyzx.cn

Xuyi High School (simplified Chinese: 江苏省盱眙中学; traditional Chinese: 江蘇省盱眙中學) is a public high school in Huaian in China's Jiangsu province. Founded in 1920, it became a key high school in 1993 and a Jiangsu four-star high school in 2004.

== History ==
Xuyi High School was founded in 1920 in Huaian in Jiangsu province. It previously was named Anhui Provincial No. 9 High School (Chinese: 安徽省立第九中学). It is the first county-level high school founded in Huaian. It is among the inaugural group of 95 key high schools (Chinese: 重点中学) in Jiangsu after it fulfilled the criteria for qualification in 1993. It became a Jiangsu four-star high school (Chinese: 江苏省四星级高中) in 2004.

The school newspaper, Campus Culture (Chinese: 校园文化), in 2005 had for 13 years running secured the top honor in a nationwide contest for high school newspapers. Students in 2013 wore uniforms inscribed with numbers on the front and back. The allocation of the numbers was directly to their ranking in the high school entrance exam. Some students told the media that they felt self-conscious in their school uniforms. The school's vice principal said the numbers were used to keep track of students as some would give fake names to the staff when they were tardy. The vice principal said it was a coincident that the numbers matched students' rankings. The school discontinued the practice.

== Notable alumni ==
- Ni Ni, actress
