= Chahe, Huai'an =

Chahe 岔河镇
- Town
- Location in Jiangsu
- Coordinates: 33°16′4″N 119°1′50″E
- Country: People's Republic of China
- Province: Jiangsu
- Prefecture-level city: Huai'an
- District: Hongze District
- Time zone: UTC+8 (China Standard)

Chahe (Chinese: 岔河; pinyin: Chàhé) is a town in Hongze District, Huai'an, Jiangsu. As of 2020, it administers the residential neighborhoods of Huaibao (淮宝), Xicheng (西城), Zhangma (张马), and Jianghuai (江淮), as well as the following 22 villages:

- Chahe Village
- Baimahu Village (白马湖村)
- Tangwei Village (唐圩村)
- Binhe Village (滨河村)
- Nanjie Village (南街村)
- Shitang Village (施汤村)
- Qianjin Village (前进村)
- Jiegou Village (界沟村)
- Xingfu Village (幸福村)
- Dongchen Village (东陈村)
- Qihu Village (其虎村)
- Duitouji Village (堆头集村)
- Chenxiang Village (陈向村)
- Shendu Village (沈渡村)
- Taoyuan Village (桃园村)
- Tongyi Village (同议村)
- Linze Village (临泽村)
- Jinli Village (金李村)
- Qianning Village (乾宁村)
- Chaoqun Village (超群村)
- Weiji Village (韦集村)
- Huaixu Village (淮徐村)
