= Jiangsu =

Province in East China

Jiangsu 江苏; 江蘇 Kiangsu
- Province

Chinese transcription(s)
  - Chinese: 江苏省; 江蘇省 (Jiāngsū Shěng)
  - Abbreviation: JS / 苏; 蘇 (pinyin: Sū)
  - Wu: kaon^{1} su^{1} san^{3}
  - Jiang–Huai: jiang^{1} su^{1} sen^{3}
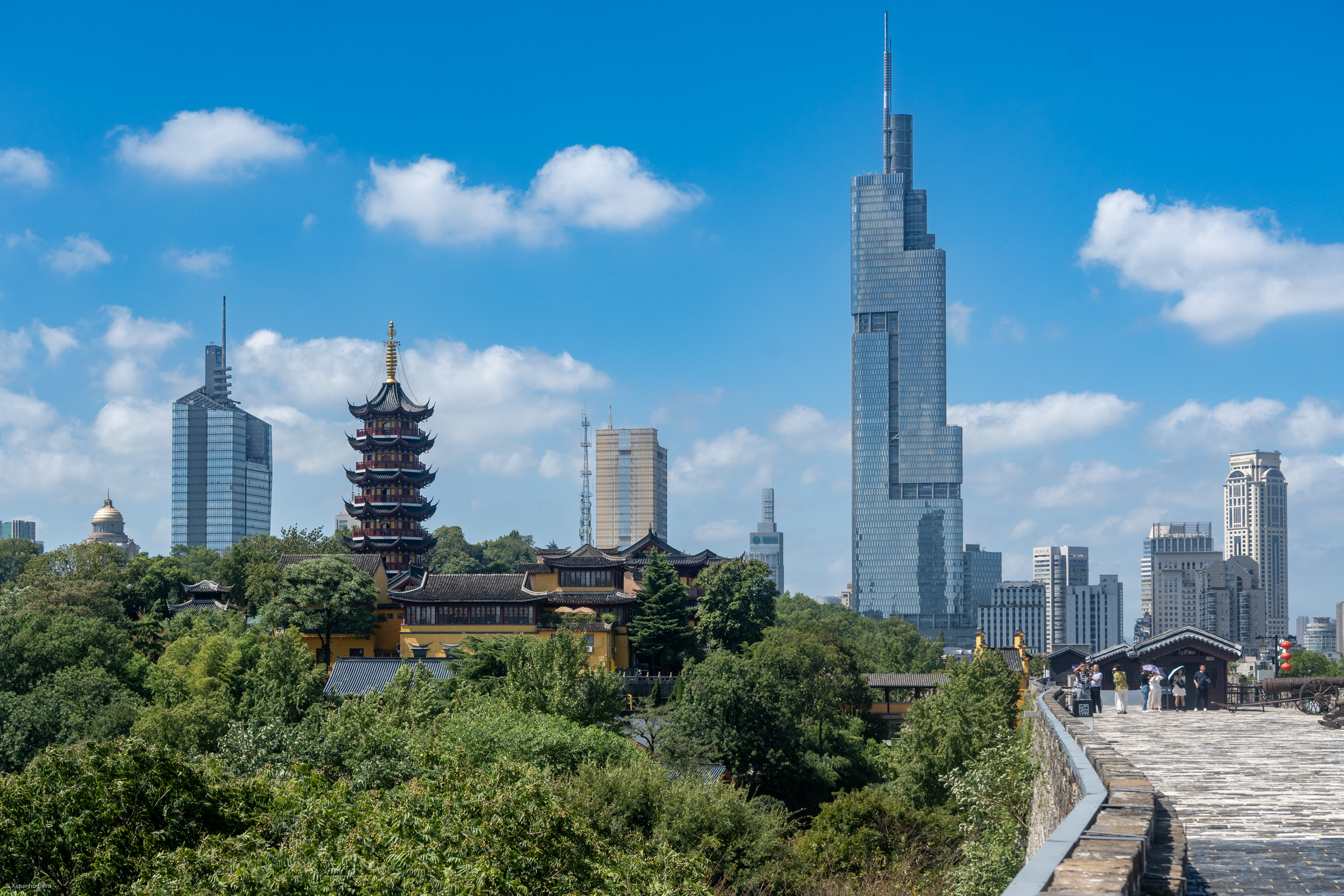
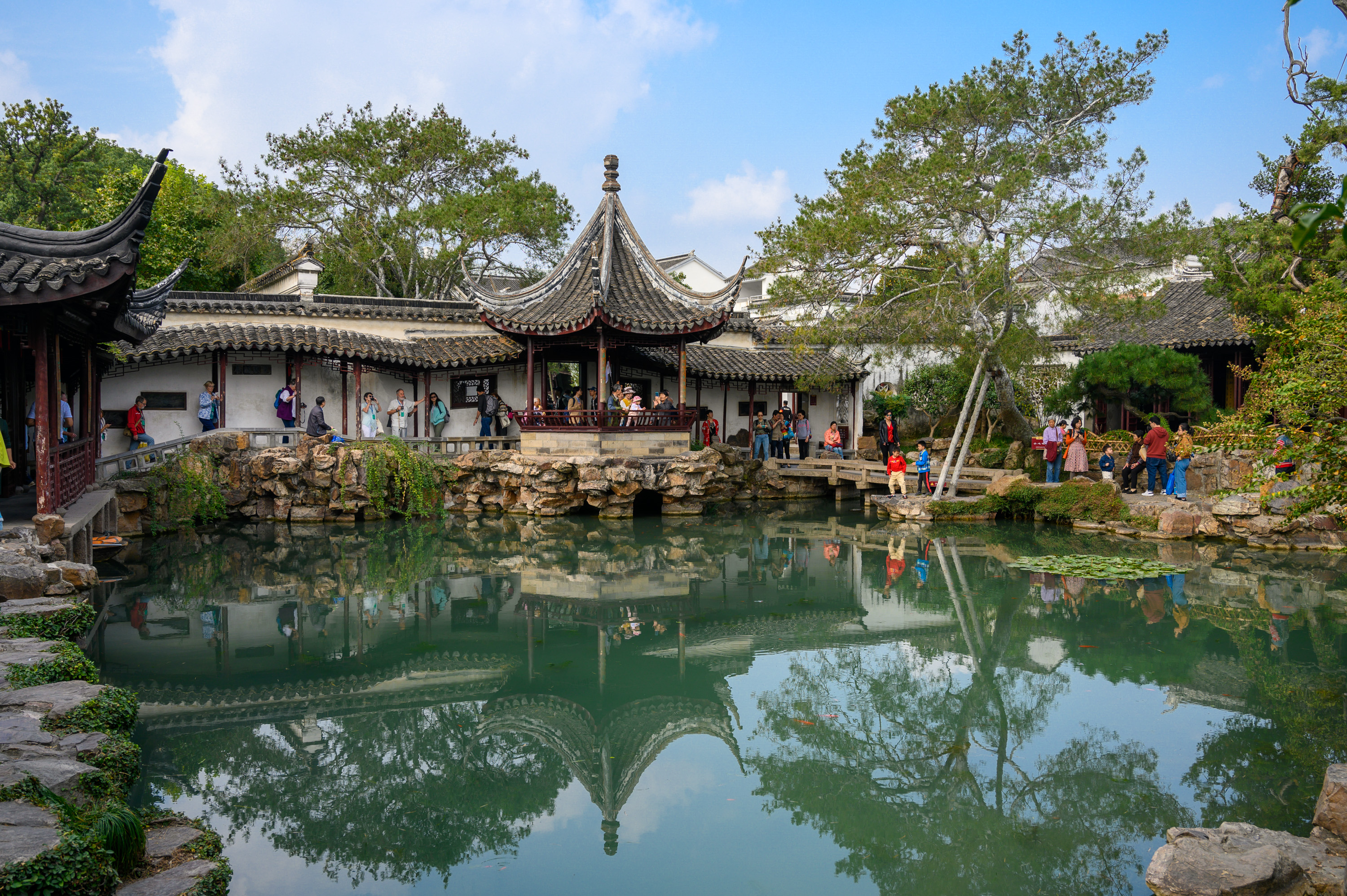
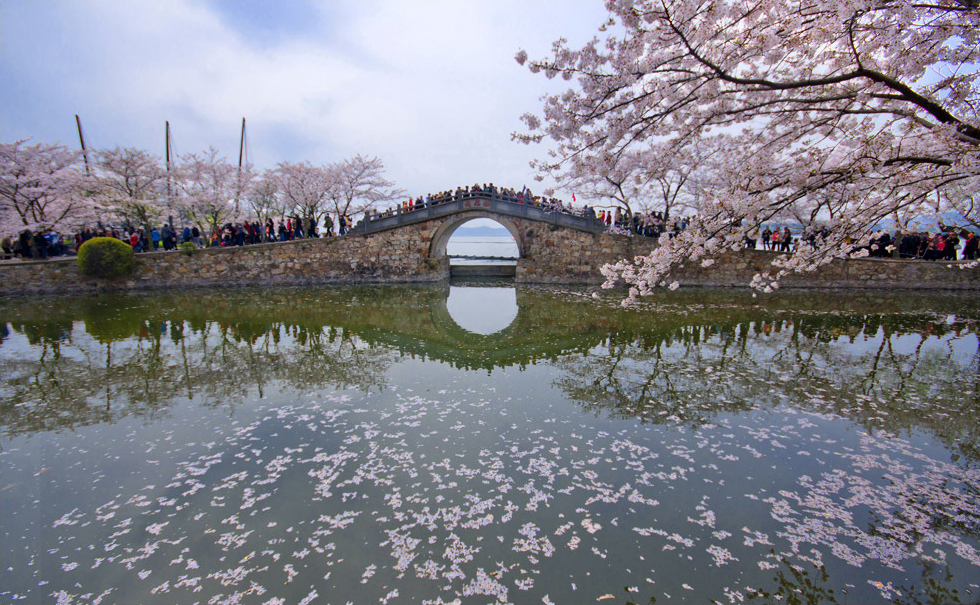
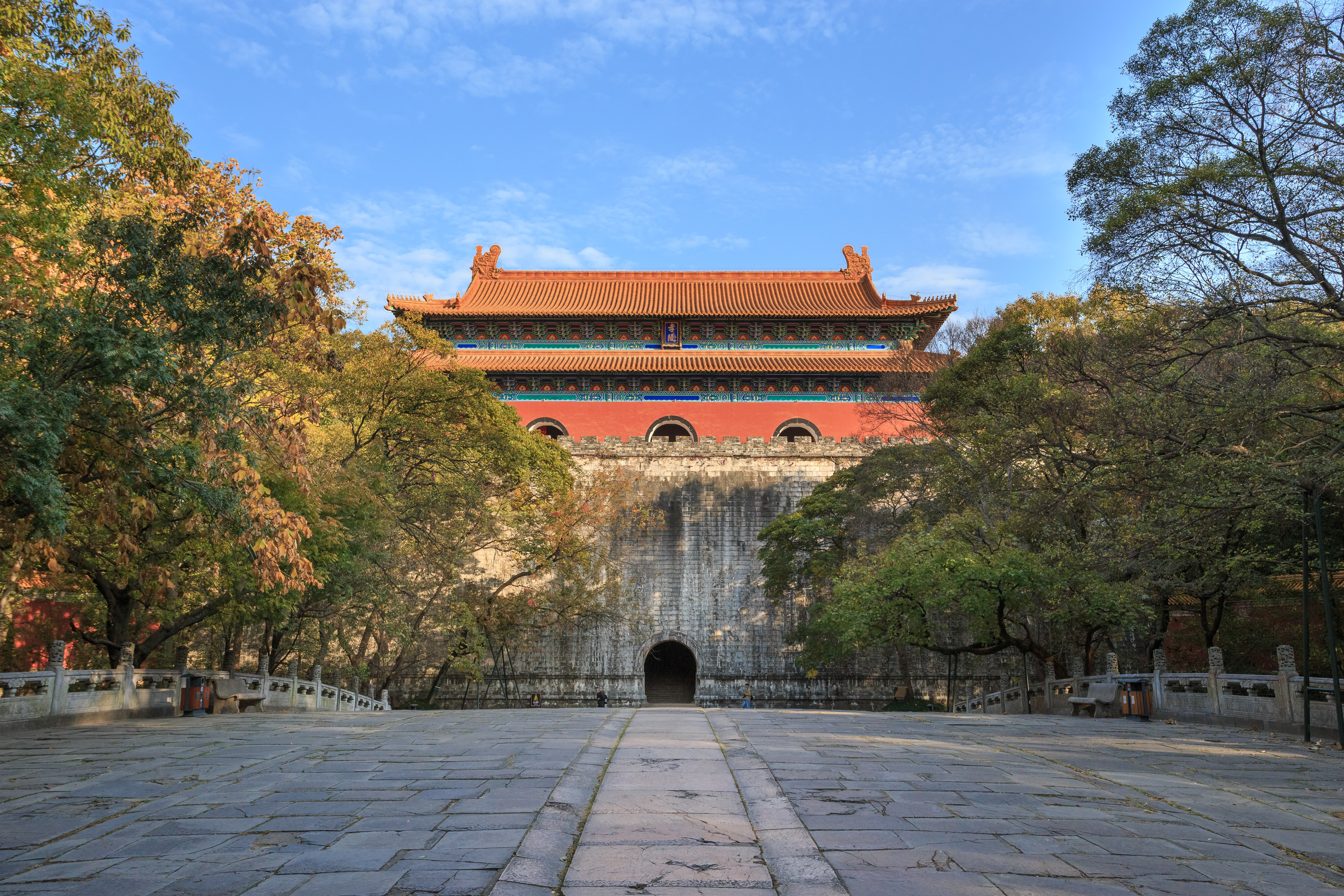
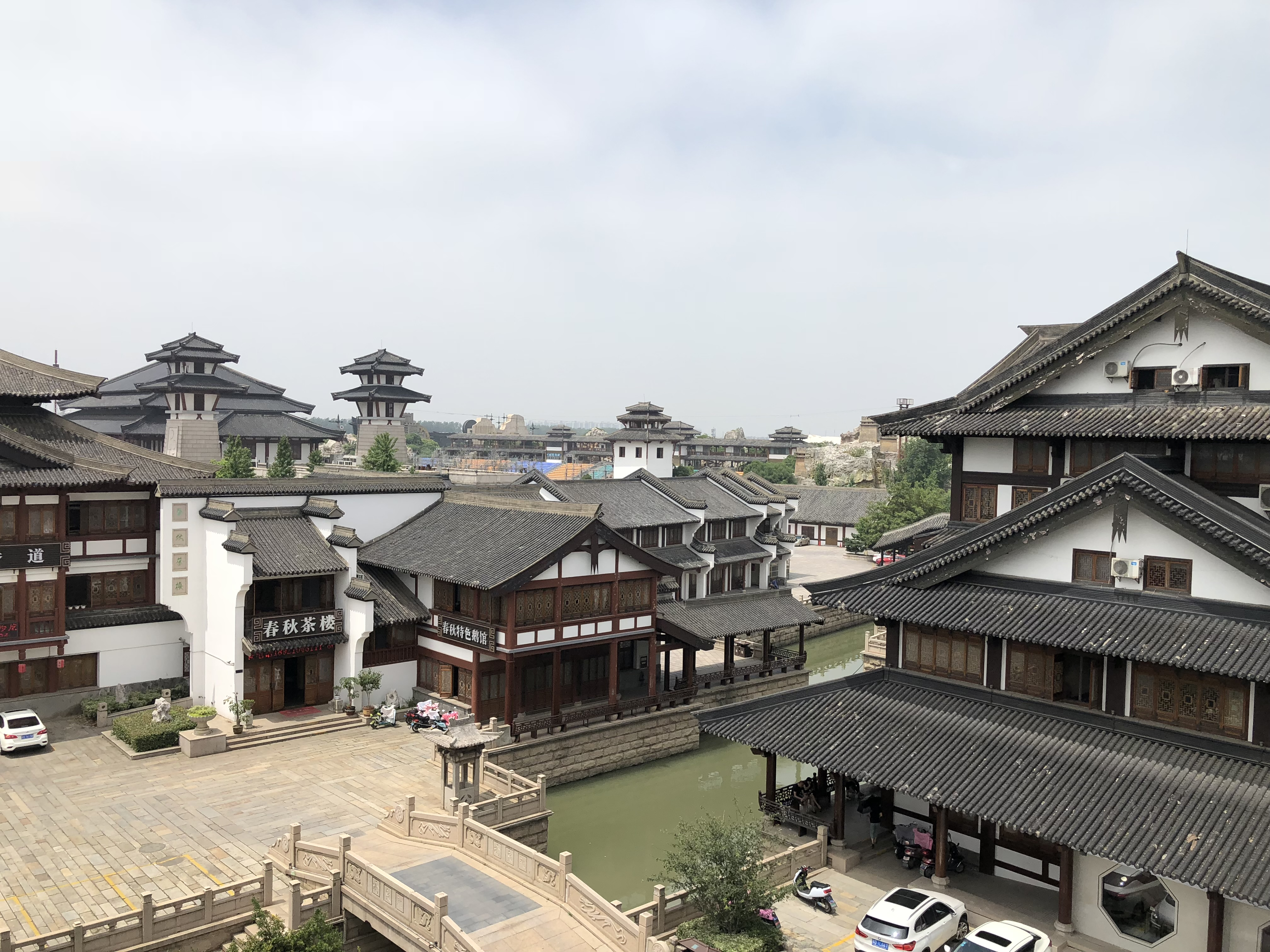
- Nanjing Master of the Nets Garden Yuantouzhu Xiao Mausoleum Chunqiu Yancheng

- Location of Jiangsu in China
- Coordinates: 32°54′N 119°48′E
- Country: China
- Detached from Jiangnan Province: 1661
- As a province of the Republic of China: January 1, 1912
- Provincial government moved to Zhenjiang: 1928
- Japanese occupation: 1937–1945
- Capture of Nanjing: April 23, 1949
- Partition into Subei and Sunan Administrative Regions: October 1, 1949
- Provincial status restored: November 15, 1952
- Named for: 江 Jiāng – Jiangning (now Nanjing) 蘇 Sū – Suzhou
- Capital: Nanjing
- Largest city: Suzhou
- Divisions: Prefecture-level; County-level; Township-; level: 13 prefectures 95 counties 1237 towns and subdistricts

Government
  - Type: Province
  - Body: Jiangsu Provincial People's Congress
  - Party Secretary: Xin Changxing
  - Congress chairman: Xin Changxing
  - Governor: Liu Xiaotao
  - Provincial CPPCC Chairman: Zhang Yizhen
  - National People's Congress Representation: 144 deputies

Area
  - Province: 102,600 km^{2} (39,600 sq mi)
  - Rank: 25th
- Highest elevation (Mount Huaguo): 625 m (2,051 ft)

Population (2020)
  - Province: 84,748,016
  - Rank: 4th
  - Density: 826.0/km^{2} (2,139/sq mi)
  - Rank: 4th
  - Urban: 63,370,000 (74%)
  - Rural: 21,780,000 (26%)
- Demonym: Jiangsunese

Demographics
  - Ethnic composition: Han: 99.6%; Hui: 0.2% (160,800)
  - Languages and dialects: Standard Chinese; Central Plains Mandarin; Lower Yangtze Mandarin; Wu Chinese

GDP (2025)
  - Total: CN¥14.24 trillion (2nd; US$2.04 trillion)
  - Per capita: CN¥167,970 (3rd; US$24,113)
- ISO 3166 code: CN-JS
- HDI (2023): 0.836 (4th) – very high
- Website: www.jiangsu.gov.cn (in Chinese); English version

Jiangsu
- "Jiangsu" in simplified (top) and traditional (bottom) Chinese characters
- Simplified Chinese: 江苏
- Traditional Chinese: 江蘇
- Postal: Kiangsu
- Literal meaning: "Pacified Place" (Jiang(ning) and Su(zhou))
Transcriptions
Standard Mandarin
- Hanyu Pinyin: Jiāngsū
- Bopomofo: ㄐㄧㄤ ㄙㄨ
- Gwoyeu Romatzyh: Jiangsu
- Wade–Giles: Chiang^{1}-su^{1}
- IPA: [tɕjáŋ.sú]
other Mandarin
- Xiao'erjing: جْيَانْقسُو
Wu
- Wugniu: kaon^{1} su^{1}
- Suzhounese: kaon^{1} sou^{1}
- IPA: Shanghainese: [kɑ̃˥ su˧] Suzhounese: [kɑ̃˦ səu]
Yue: Cantonese
- Yale Romanization: Gōng-sōu
- Jyutping: gong^{1} sou^{1}
- IPA: [kɔŋ˥.sɔw˥]
Southern Min
- Tâi-lô: Kang-soo

Jiangsu (Note: UK: /dʒæŋˈsuː/; US: /ˈdʒjɑːŋˈsuː/ Chinese: 江苏; pinyin: Jiāngsū, alternatively romanized as Kiangsu or Chiangsu) is a coastal province in East China. It is one of the leading provinces in finance, education, technology, and tourism, with its capital in Nanjing. Jiangsu is the third smallest, but the fourth most populous, with a population of 84.75 million, and the most densely populated of the 22 provinces of the People's Republic of China. Jiangsu has the highest GDP per capita and second-highest GDP of Chinese provinces, after Guangdong. Jiangsu borders Shandong in the north, Anhui to the west, and Zhejiang and Shanghai to the south. Jiangsu has a coastline of over 1,000 kilometers (620 mi) along the Yellow Sea, and the Yangtze flows through the southern part of the province.

Since the Sui and Tang dynasties, Jiangsu has been a national economic and commercial center, partly due to the construction of the Grand Canal. Cities such as Nanjing, Suzhou, Wuxi, Changzhou, and Shanghai (separated from Jiangsu in 1927) are all major Chinese economic hubs. Since the initiation of economic reforms in 1990, Jiangsu has become a focal point for economic development. It is widely regarded as one of China's most developed provinces, when measured by its Human Development Index (HDI). Its 2025 nominal GDP per capita reached CN¥167,970 (US$24,113), becoming the first province in China to reach the $20,000 mark in 2021.

Jiangsu is home to many of the world's leading exporters of electronic equipment, chemicals and textiles. It has also been China's largest recipient of foreign direct investment since 2006. In 2025, its GDP was more than CN¥14.24 trillion (US$2 trillion nominal), which is the sixth-highest of all administrative divisions. If it were a country, it would be the twelfth-largest economy as of 2022 as well as the 19th most populous.

Jiangsu is also one of the leading provinces in research and education in China. As of 2022, Jiangsu hosts 168 institutions of higher education, ranking first of all Chinese provinces. Jiangsu has many highly ranked educational institutions, with 16 of its universities listed in the Double First-Class Construction, ranking second after Beijing. As of 2025, six major cities in Jiangsu ranked in the world's top 200 (Nanjing 5th, Suzhou 33rd, Zhenjiang 98th, Yangzhou 118th, Wuxi 161st, and Changzhou 173rd) cities by scientific research output, as tracked by the Nature Index.

== Name ==
Jiangsu's name is a compound of the first elements of the names of the two cities of Jiangning (now Nanjing) and Suzhou; meaning "Pacified Place". The first character is derived from Chinese abbreviation of jiāng (江) for Jiangning taken from its Northern Song name of Jiangning (江寧, Jiāngníng, "Pacified area of the Yangtze"), while the abbreviation for this province is "苏" (Sū), which serves the second character of its name is a contraction of the old name Gusu. It refers to "Satisfied place" in the Old Yue language.

Alternatively, the province is also spelled in various forms as Chiangsu, Chiang-su or Kiangsu in postal romanization. Since 1958, the province has adopted its current pinyin name of Jiangsu, a spelling that would be adopted by numerous international organizations and media outlets by the 1980s.

== History ==
=== Imperial dynasties ===
During the earliest Chinese dynasties, the area that is now Jiangsu was far away from the center of Chinese civilization, which was in the northwest Henan; it was home of the Huai barbarians (淮夷), an ancient ethnic group. During the Zhou dynasty more contact was made, and eventually the state of Wu appeared in southern Jiangsu, one of the many hundreds of states that existed across northern and central China at that time. Near the end of the Spring and Autumn period, Wu became a great power under King Helu of Wu, and defeated in 484 BC the state of Qi, a major power in the north in modern-day Shandong province, and contest for the position of overlord over all states of China. The state of Wu was subjugated in 473 BC by the state of Yue, another state that had emerged to the south in modern-day Zhejiang province. Yue was in turn subjugated by the powerful state of Chu from the west in 333 BC. Eventually the state of Qin swept away all the other states, and unified China in 221 BC.

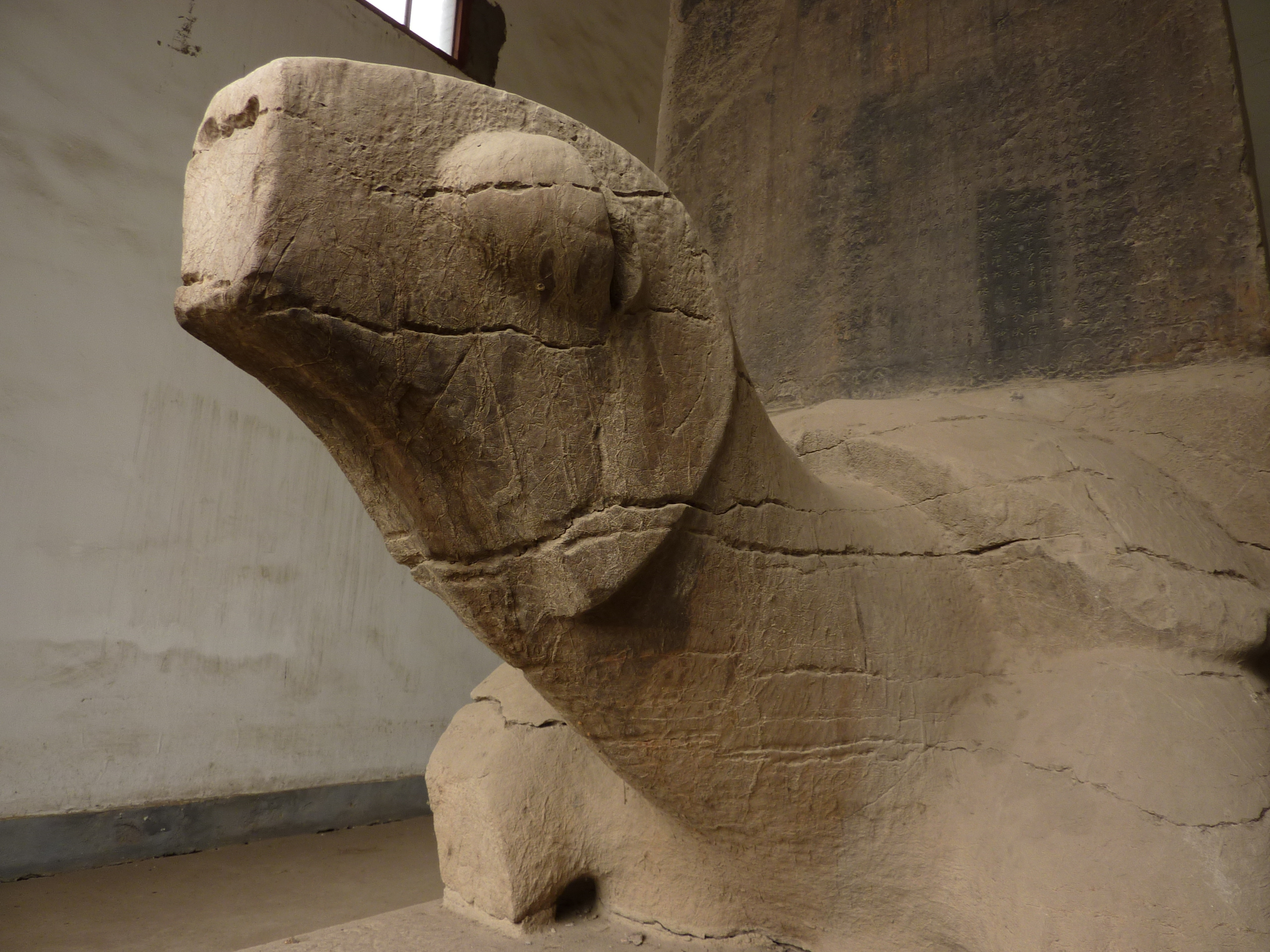
One of the tortoise stelae of Xiao Dan (478–522), a member of the Liang royal family. Ganjiaxiang, Qixia District, near Nanjing

Under the reign of the Han dynasty (206 BC to 220 AD), Jiangsu was removed from the centers of civilization in the North China Plain, and was administered under two zhou (provinces): Xu Province in the north, and Yang Province in the south. During the Three Kingdoms period, southern Jiangsu became the base of the Eastern Wu (222 to 280), whose capital, Jianye (later renamed to Jiankang), is modern Nanjing. When nomadic invasions overran northern China in the 4th century, the imperial court of the Jin dynasty moved to Jiankang. Cities in southern and central Jiangsu swelled with the influx of migrants from the north. Jiankang remained as the capital for four successive Southern dynasties and became the largest commercial and cultural center in China.

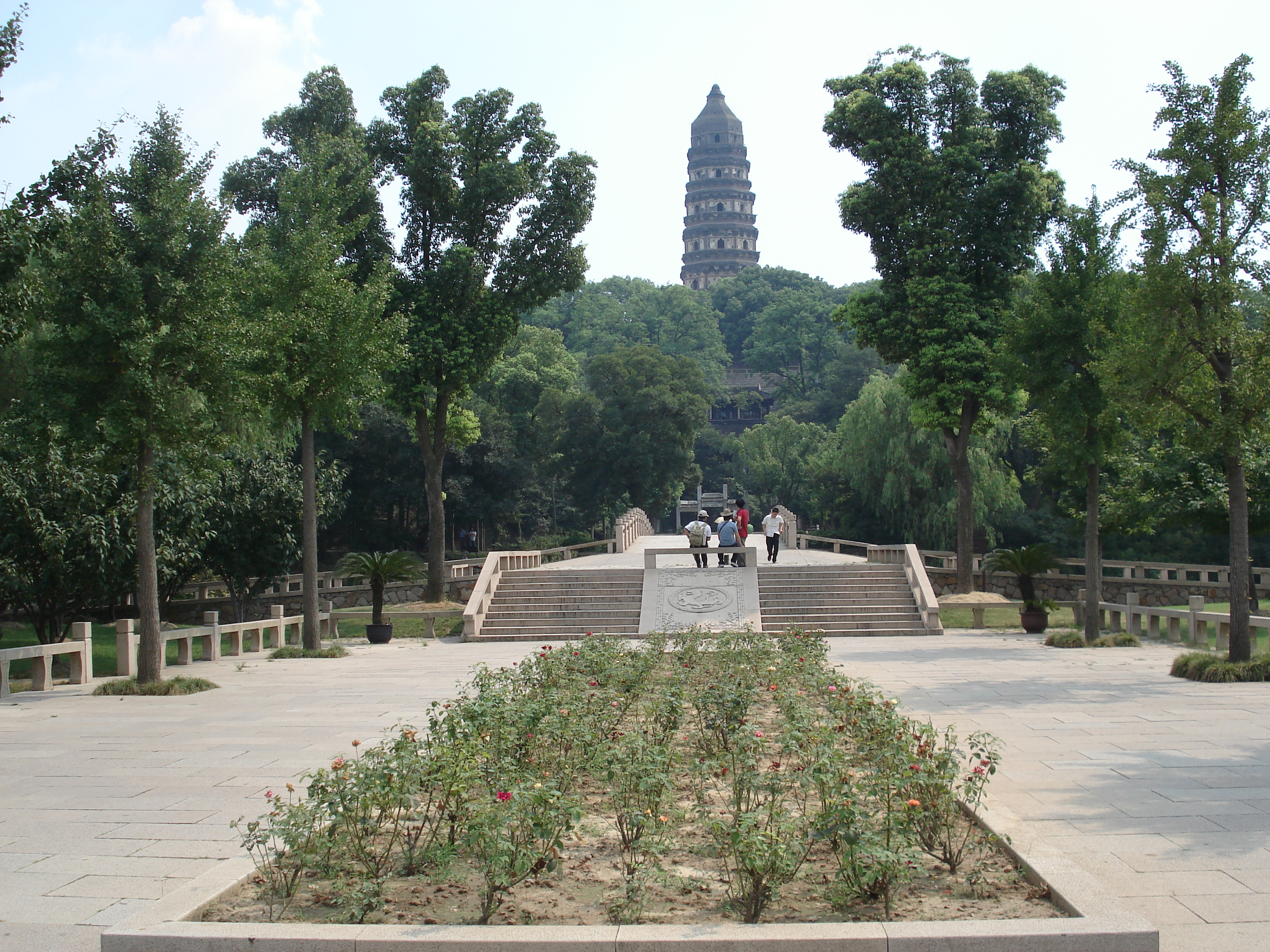
The Huqiu Tower of Tiger Hill, Suzhou, built in 961

After the Sui dynasty united the country in 581, the political center of the country shifted back to the north, but the Grand Canal was built through Jiangsu to link the Central Plains with the prosperous Yangtze Delta. The Tang dynasty (618–907) relied on southern Jiangsu for annual deliveries of grain. It was during the Song dynasty (960–1279), which saw the development of a wealthy mercantile class and emergent market economy in China, that Jiangnan (southern Jiangsu, Shanghai, and adjacent areas) emerged as a center of trade. From then onwards, major cities like Suzhou or Yangzhou, would be synonymous with opulence and luxury in China. Today the region remains one of the richest parts of China.

The Jurchen Jin dynasty gained control of North China in 1127 during the Jin-Song wars, and Huai River, which used to cut through north Jiangsu to reach the Yellow Sea, was the border between the north, under the Jin, and the south, under the Southern Song dynasty. The Mongols took control of China in the thirteenth century. The Ming dynasty, which was established in 1368 after driving out the Mongols who had occupied China, initially put its capital in Nanjing. Regions surrounding Nanjing, corresponding to Jiangsu and Anhui today, were designated as Nanzhili province (literally "southern directly governed"). Following a coup by Zhu Di (later, the Yongle Emperor), however, the capital was moved to Beijing, far to the north, although Nanjing kept its status as the southern capital. In late Ming, Jiangnan continued to be an important center of trade in China; some historians see in the flourishing textiles industry at the time incipient industrialization and capitalism, a trend that was however aborted.

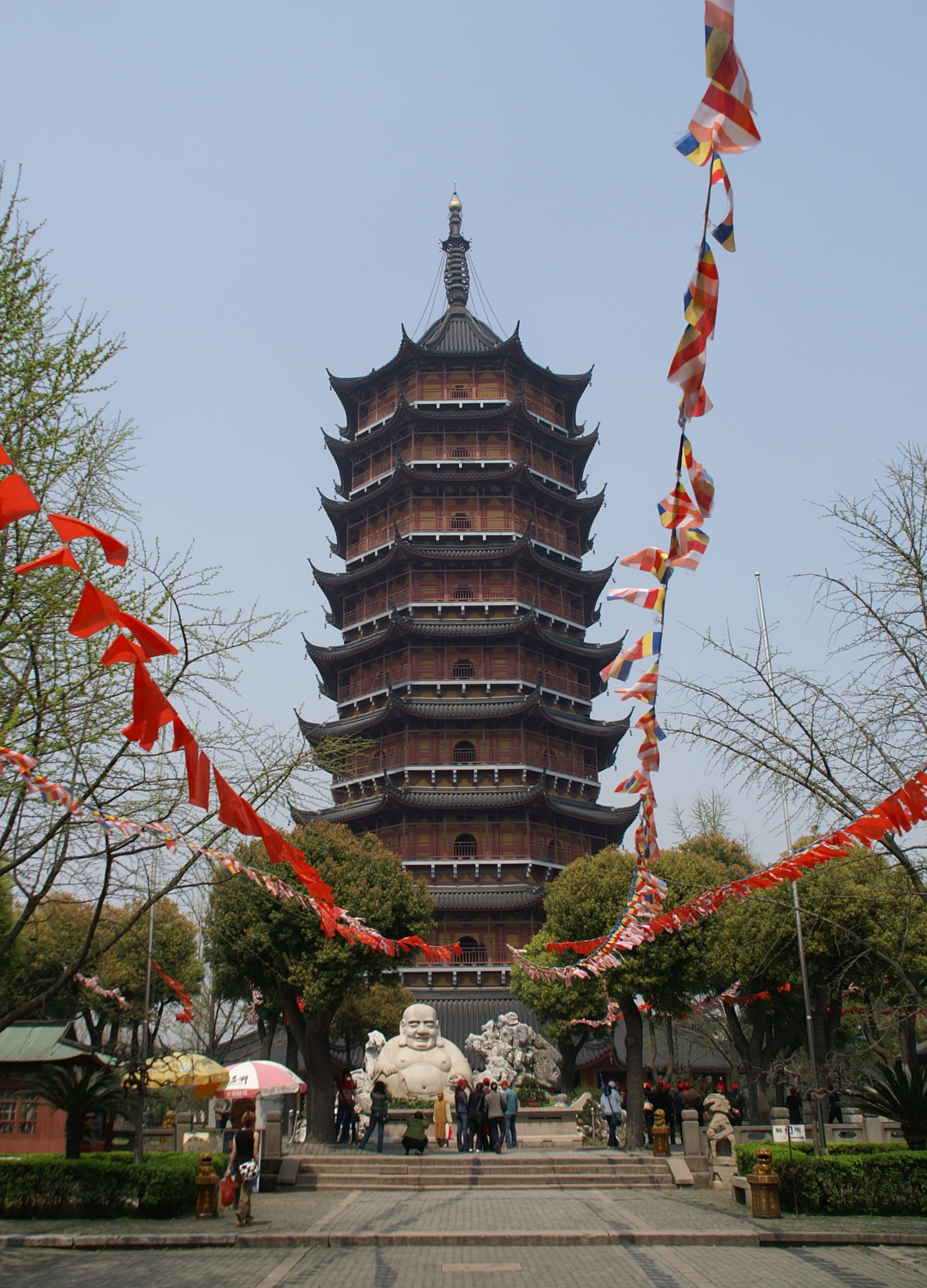
The 76 m (249 ft) tall Beisi Pagoda of Suzhou, built between 1131 and 1162 during the Song dynasty

The Qing dynasty converted Nanzhili to "Jiangnan province"; in 1666 Jiangsu and Anhui were split apart as separate provinces. Jiangsu's borders have been for the most part stable since then.

With the start of Western incursion into China in the 1840s, the rich and mercantile Yangtze River Delta was increasingly exposed to Western influence. Shanghai, originally an unremarkable little town of Jiangsu, quickly developed into a metropolis of trade, banking, and cosmopolitanism, and was split out later as an independent municipality. Jiangnan also figures strongly in the Taiping Rebellion (1851 – 1864), a massive and deadly rebellion that attempted to set up a Christian theocracy in China; it started far to the south, in Guangdong province, swept through much of South China, and by 1853, had established Nanjing as its capital, renamed as Tianjing (天京 "Heavenly Capital").

=== Modern times ===
The Republic of China was established in 1912, and China was soon torn apart by warlords. Jiangsu changed hands several times, but in April 1927, Chiang Kai-shek established a government at Nanjing; he was soon able to bring most of China under his control. The provincial government moved to Zhenjiang in 1928. This was however interrupted by the second Sino-Japanese War, which began full-scale in 1937; on December 13, 1937, Nanjing fell, and the combined atrocities of the occupying Japanese for the next three months would come to be known as the Rape of Nanjing, after which it became the seat of the collaborationist government of East China under Wang Jingwei, and most of Jiangsu remained under Japanese occupation until the end of the war in 1945.

After the war, Nanjing was once again the capital of the Republic of China, though now the Chinese Civil War had broken out between the Kuomintang government and Communist forces, based further north, mostly in Northeast China. The decisive Huaihai Campaign was fought in northern Jiangsu; it resulted in Kuomintang defeat, and the communists were soon able to cross the Yangtze River and take Nanjing. The Kuomintang fled southward and eventually ended up in Taipei, from which the Republic of China government continues to administer Taiwan, Pescadores, and its neighboring islands, though it also continues to claim (technically, at least) Nanjing as its rightful de jure capital. Later on, after the capture of Zhenjiang, the provincial government was then relocated to Shengsi County in Zhejiang.

After the communist takeover, Beijing (formerly Peiping) was made capital of the People's Republic, while Jiangsu was dissolved into Subei and Sunan Administrative Regions. On November 15, 1952, Jiangsu Province was reconstituted and Nanjing was demoted to be the provincial capital. The reform and opening up of Deng Xiaoping initially focused on the south coast of China, in Guangdong province, which soon left Jiangsu behind; starting from the 1990s they were applied more evenly to the rest of China. Suzhou and Wuxi, two southern cities of Jiangsu in close proximity to neighboring Shanghai, have since become particularly prosperous, being among the top 10 cities in China in terms of gross domestic product and outstripping the provincial capital of Nanjing. The income disparity between northern and southern Jiangsu however remains large.

== Geography ==
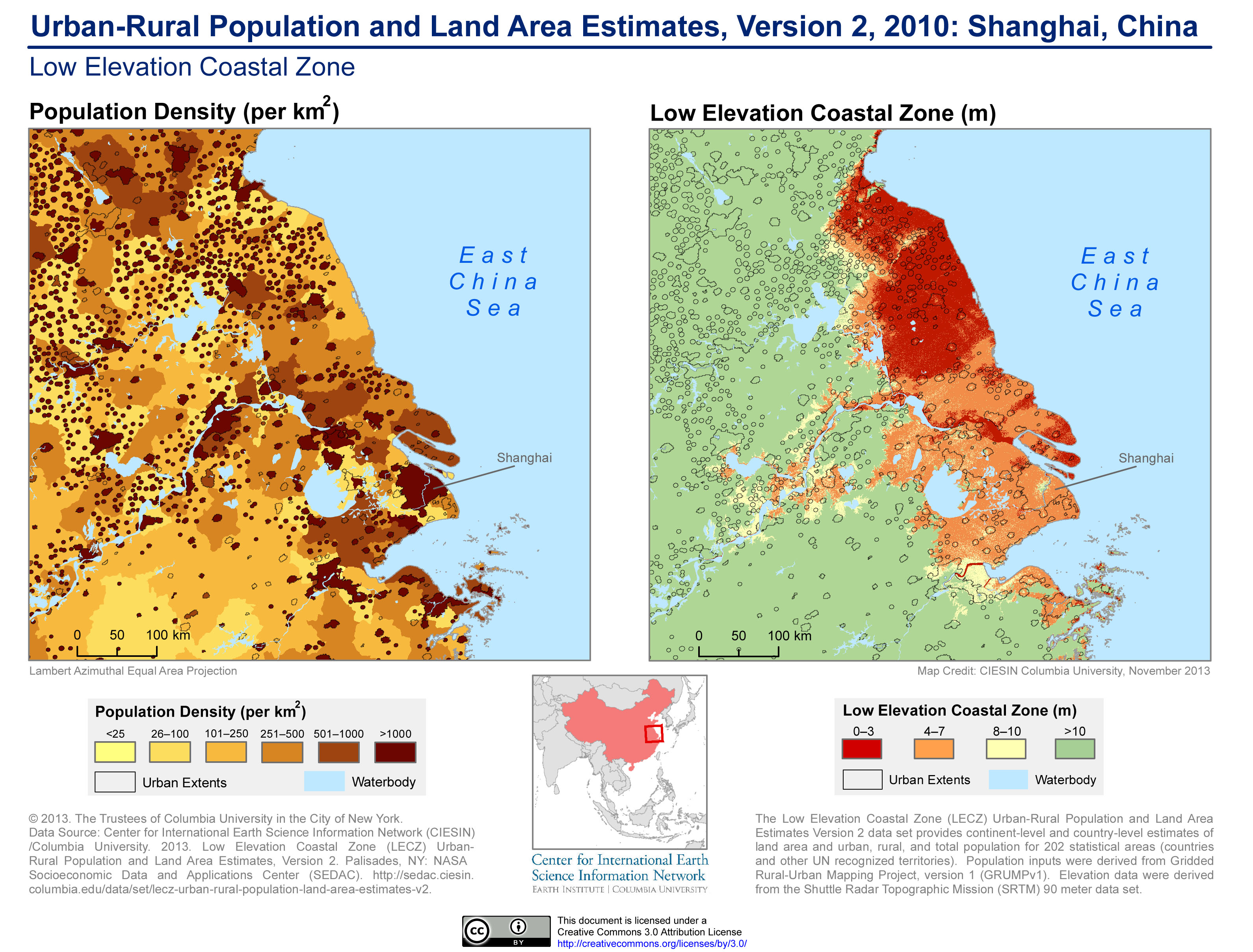
Population density and low elevation coastal zones in Jiangsu. Jiangsu is particularly vulnerable to sea level rise.

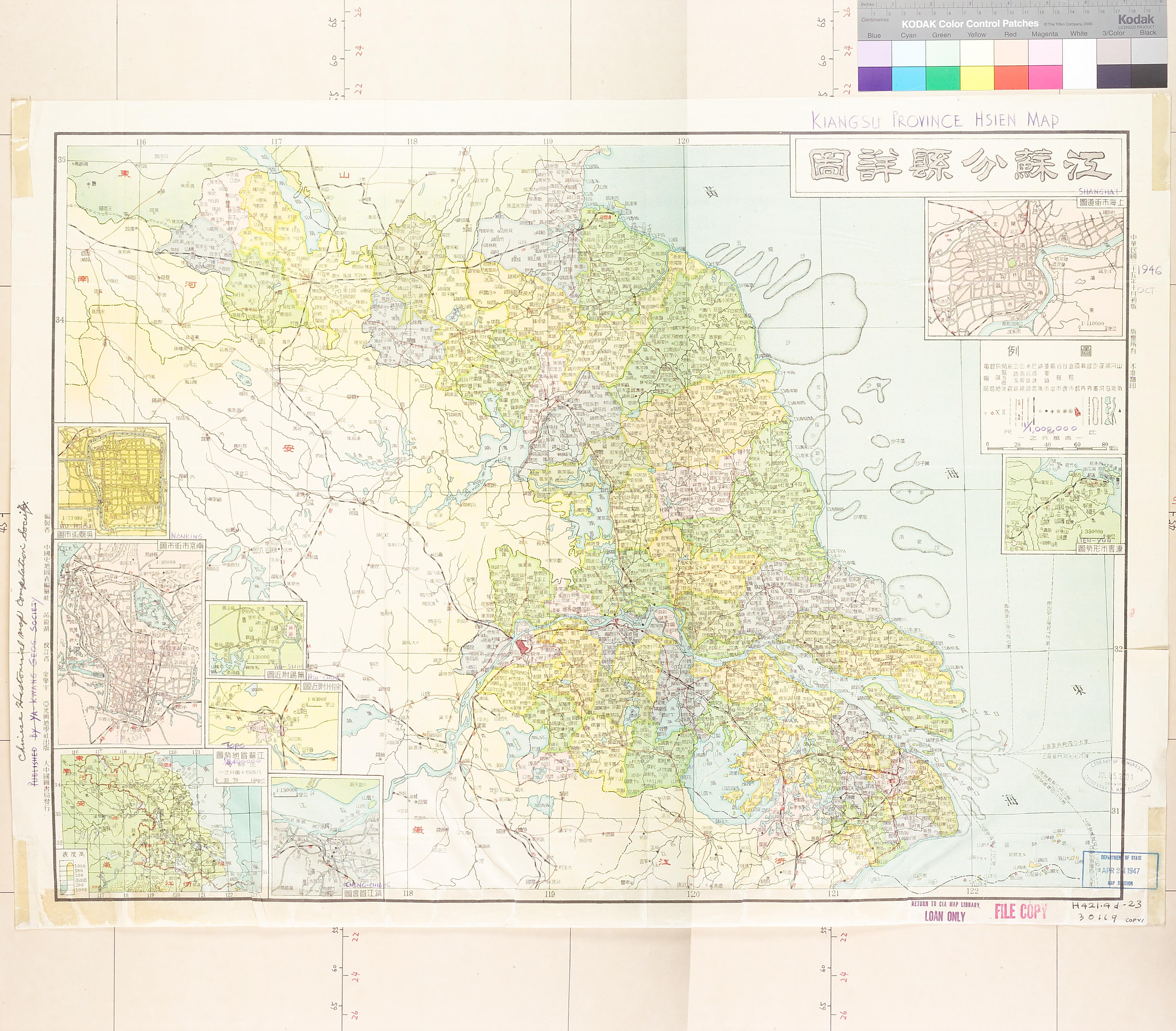
Jiangsu in 1946

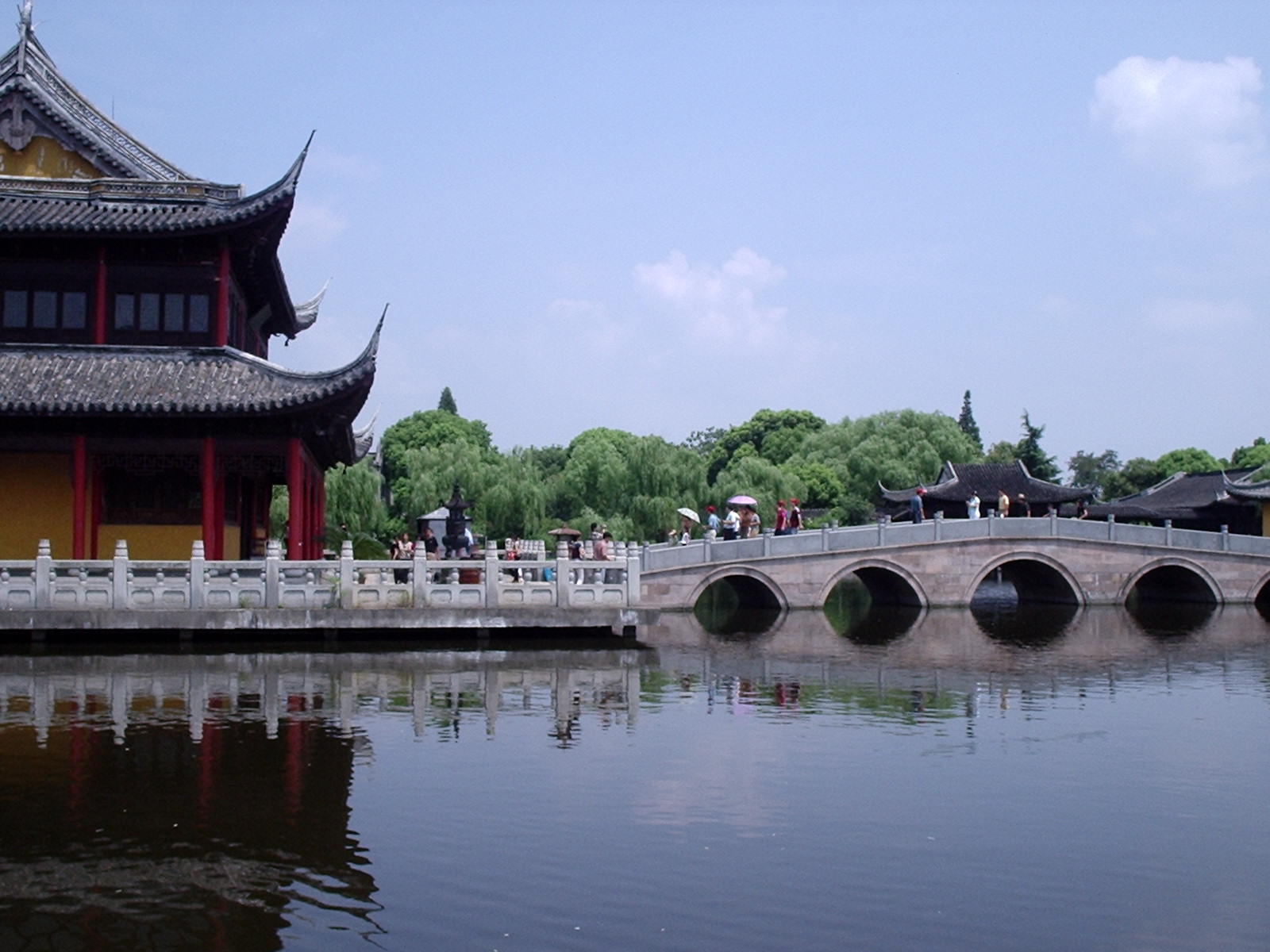
Tourists cross a bridge in Chengxu temple, a Taoist temple which was built in 1086–1093 during the Song dynasty

Jiangsu is flat, with plains covering 68 percent of its total area (water covers another 18 percent). Most of the province stands not more than 50 meters (160 ft) above sea level. Jiangsu also has a well-developed irrigation system, which earned it (especially the southern half) the moniker of traditional Chinese: 水鄕; simplified Chinese: 水乡 (shuǐxiāng "land of water"). The southern city of Suzhou has so many canals that it has been dubbed "Venice of the East" or the "Venice of the Orient". The Grand Canal of China cuts through Jiangsu from north to south, crossing all the east–west river systems. Jiangsu also borders the Yellow Sea. The Yangtze River, the longest river of China, cuts through the province in the south and reaches the East China Sea, which divides the region into two parts: more urban, prosperous south and more poorer, rural north, and these two parts have a tense division. Mount Huaguo, near the city of Lianyungang, is the highest point in Jiangsu, at an altitude of 625 meters (2,051 ft) above sea level. Large lakes in Jiangsu include Lake Tai (the largest), Lake Hongze, Lake Gaoyou, Lake Luoma, and Lake Yangcheng.

Before 1194 A.D., the Huai River cut through north Jiangsu to reach the Yellow Sea. The Huai River is a major river in central China, and it was the traditional border between North China and South China. Since 1194 A.D., the Yellow River further to the north changed its course several times, running into the Huai River in north Jiangsu each time instead of its other usual path northwards into Bohai Bay. The silting caused by the Yellow River was so heavy that after its last episode of "hijacking" the Huai River ended in 1855: the Huai River was no longer able to go through its usual path into the sea. Instead it flooded, pooled up (thereby forming and enlarging Lake Hongze and Lake Gaoyou), and flowed southwards through the Grand Canal into the Yangtze. The old path of the Huai River is now marked by a series of irrigation channels, the most significant of which is the North Jiangsu Main Irrigation Canal (traditional Chinese: 蘇北灌溉總渠; simplified Chinese: 苏北灌溉总渠), which channels a small amount of the water of the Huai River alongside south of its old path into the sea.

Xuanwu Lake in Nanjing

Most of Jiangsu has a humid subtropical climate (Cfa or Cwa in the Köppen climate classification), beginning to transition into a humid continental climate (Köppen Dwa) in the far north. Seasonal changes are clear-cut, with temperatures at an average of −1 to 4 °C (30 to 39 °F) in January and 26 to 29 °C (79 to 84 °F) in July. Rain falls frequently between spring and summer (meiyu), typhoons with rainstorms occur in late summer and early autumn. As with the rest of the coast, tornados are possible. The annual average rainfall is 800 to 1,200 millimeters (31 to 47 in), concentrated mostly in summer during the southeast monsoon.

=== Climate change in Jiangsu ===
Due to its flat terrain, low altitude, and dense population, Jiangsu is one of the most vulnerable regions in China to climate change and its ensuing sea level rise. According to the data collected by the Center of Climate Change in Jiangsu from 1961 to 2007, on average, the province experiences an temperature increase between 0.16 and 0.45 °C per 10 years and total precipitation change between -28.7 and 37.09 mm per 10 years. Extreme weather have become stronger and more common. Jiangsu's agriculture, ecosystem, water resource, transportation, and coastline are all negatively impacted. The speed of sea level rise exceeds the world's average by a large margin.

Specifically, a ranking on climate change risk of global regions released in early 2023 by the Cross Dependency Initiative (XDI) puts Jiangsu as the most vulnerable of the entire world. Jiangsu is at more risk due to its extensive industrial, trade, residential, and commercial development.

In response to climate disturbance across the country, the fourteenth five-year plan, endorsed by the National People's Congress in 2021, indicates the general direction and various steps towards a low-carbon transition. On a provincial level, the Jiangsu government aims to achieve an 18% carbon dioxide decrease per unit GDP and accelerate the development of a green, low-carbon economy, as indicated in the 14th five-year development. The province also plans to recover the damaged coastal regions such as Lianyugang and Yancheng, and improve resilience against rising sea level by implementing seawalls and river floodgates.

Major cities:

- Nanjing
- Suzhou
- Wuxi
- Xuzhou
- Changzhou
- Yangzhou
- Lianyungang
- Yancheng
- Zhenjiang
- Nantong
- Huai'an
- Taizhou
- Suqian

== Administrative divisions ==
Jiangsu is divided into thirteen prefecture-level divisions, all prefecture-level cities (including a sub-provincial city):

Administrative divisions of Jiangsu
Division code	Division	Area in km^{2}	Population 2020	Seat	Divisions		
Division code	Division	Area in km^{2}	Population 2020	Seat	Districts	Counties	CL cities
320000	Jiangsu Province	102,600.00	84,748,016	Nanjing city	55	19	21
320100	Nanjing city	6,582.31	9,314,685	Xuanwu District	11		
320200	Wuxi city	4,787.61	7,462,135	Binhu District	5		2
320300	Xuzhou city	11,764.88	9,083,790	Yunlong District	5	3	2
320400	Changzhou city	4,384.57	5,278,121	Xinbei District	5		1
320500	Suzhou city	8,488.42	12,748,262	Gusu District	5		4
320600	Nantong city	8,001.00	7,726,635	Chongchuan District	3	1	3
320700	Lianyungang city	7,615.29	4,599,360	Haizhou District	3	3	
320800	Huai'an city	9,949.97	4,556,230	Qingjiangpu District	4	3	
320900	Yancheng city	16,972.42	6,709,629	Tinghu District	3	5	1
321000	Yangzhou city	6,591.21	4,559,797	Hanjiang District	3	1	2
321100	Zhenjiang city	3,840.32	3,210,418	Jingkou District	3		3
321200	Taizhou city	5,787.26	4,512,762	Hailing District	3		3
321300	Suqian city	8,555.00	4,986,192	Sucheng District	2	3	
Sub-provincial cities

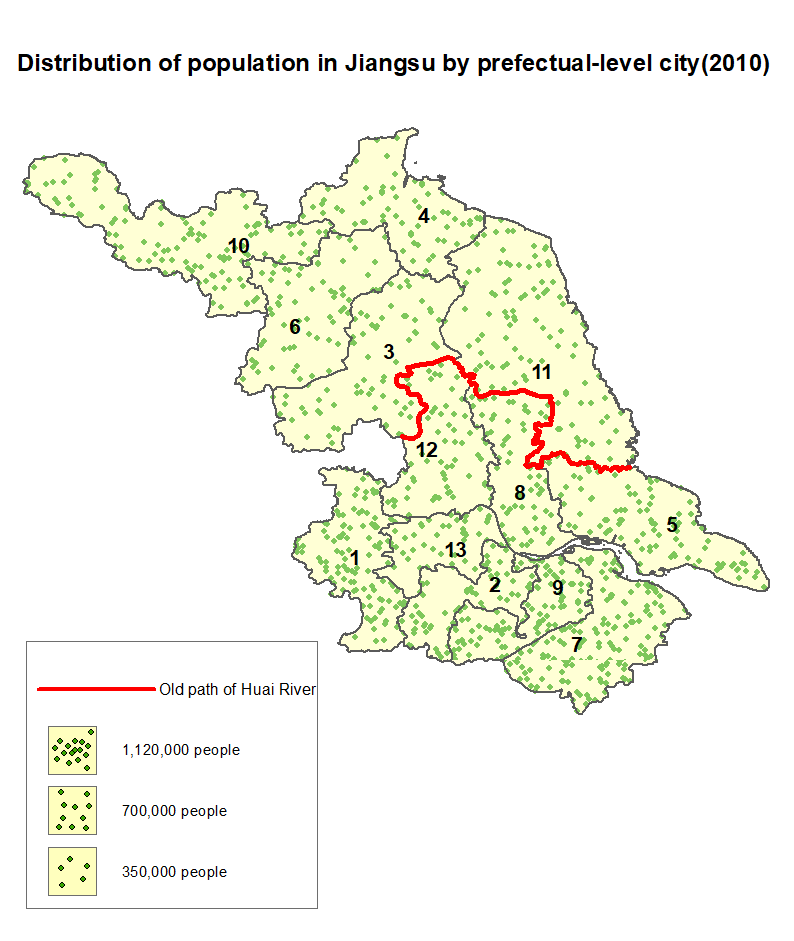
Population distribution of Jiangsu in 2010

Administrative divisions in Chinese and varieties of romanizations
English	Chinese	Pinyin	Wu Romanization	Jiang–Huai (Langjin Pinin)
Jiangsu Province	江苏省	Jiāngsū Shěng	kaon sou san	Jiang1 su1 Sen3
Nanjing city	南京市	Nánjīng Shì	noe cin zy	Lang2 jin1 Shr4
Wuxi city	无锡市	Wúxī Shì	vu sih zy	U2 si5 Shr4
Xuzhou city	徐州市	Xúzhōu Shì	zi tseu zy	Sü2 zhou1 Shr4
Changzhou city	常州市	Chángzhōu Shì	zan tseu zy	Chang2 zhou1 Shr4
Suzhou city	苏州市	Sūzhōu Shì	sou tseu zy	Su1 zhou1 Shr4
Nantong city	南通市	Nántōng Shì	noe thon zy	Lang2 tong1 Shr4
Lianyungang city	连云港市	Liányúngǎng Shì	lie yuin kaon zy	Liän2 üin2 gang3 Shr4
Huai'an city	淮安市	Huái'ān Shì	wa oe zy	Huä2 ang1 Shr4
Yancheng city	盐城市	Yánchéng Shì	yie zen zy	Iän2 chen2 Shr4
Yangzhou city	扬州市	Yángzhōu Shì	yan tseu zy	Iang2 zhou1 Shr4
Zhenjiang city	镇江市	Zhènjiāng Shì	tsen kaon zy	Zhen4 jang1 Shr4
Taizhou city	泰州市	Tàizhōu Shì	tha tseu zy	Tä4 zhou1 Shr4
Suqian city	宿迁市	Sùqiān Shì	soh tshie zy	Su5 ciän1 Shr4

These prefecture-level cities are in turn subdivided into 95 county-level divisions (55 districts, 21 county-level cities, and 19 counties). Those are in turn divided into 1,237 township-level divisions (699 towns, 19 townships, and 519 subdistricts). At the end of the year 2021, the total population was 85.05 million.

Population by urban areas of prefecture & county cities
No.	Cities	2020 Urban area	2010 Urban area	2020 City proper
1	Nanjing	8,085,241	5,827,888 (Note: New districts established after 2010 census: Lishui (Lishui County), Gaochun (Gaochun County). These new districts not included in the urban area count of the pre-expanded city.)	9,314,685
2	Suzhou	5,892,892	3,302,152 (Note: New district established after 2010 census: Wujiang (Wujiang CLC). The new district not included in the urban area count of the pre-expanded city.)	12,748,262
3	Wuxi	3,956,985	2,757,736	7,462,135
4	Changzhou	3,572,349	2,257,376 (Note: New district established after 2010 census: Jintan (Jintan CLC). The new district not included in the urban area count of the pre-expanded city.)	5,278,121
5	Xuzhou	2,517,693	1,735,166 (Note: New district established after 2010 census: Tongshan (Tongshan County). The new district not included in the urban area count of the pre-expanded city.)	9,083,790
6	Nantong	1,993,344 (Note: New district established after 2020 census: Haimen (Haimen CLC). The new district not included in the urban area count of the pre-expanded city.)	1,612,385	7,726,635
7	Yangzhou	1,846,656	1,077,531 (Note: New district established after 2010 census: Jiangdu (Jiangdu CLC). The new district not included in the urban area count of the pre-expanded city.)	4,559,797
8	Yancheng	1,678,542	1,136,826 (Note: New district established after 2010 census: Dafeng (Dafeng CLC). The new district not included in the urban area count of the pre-expanded city.)	6,709,629
9	Kunshan	1,652,159	1,118,617	see Suzhou
10	Huai'an	1,561,105	1,523,655 (Note: New district established after 2010 census: Hongze (Hongze County). The new district not included in the urban area count of the pre-expanded city.)	4,556,230
11	Lianyungang	1,395,701	897,393 (Note: New district established after 2010 census: Ganyu (Ganyu County). The new district not included in the urban area count of the pre-expanded city.)	4,599,360
12	Jiangyin	1,331,352	1,013,670	see Wuxi
13	Changshu	1,230,599	929,124	see Suzhou
14	Taizhou	1,140,206	676,877 (Note: New district established after 2010 census: Jiangyan (Jiangyan CLC). The new district not included in the urban area count of the pre-expanded city.)	4,512,762
15	Zhenjiang	1,123,813	950,516	3,210,418
16	Zhangjiagang	1,055,893	762,625	see Suzhou
17	Suqian	940,921	783,376	4,986,192
18	Yixing	889,871	710,497	see Wuxi
19	Pizhou	850,815	631,572	see Xuzhou
20	Danyang	792,584	500,572	see Zhenjiang
21	Rugao	761,879	614,909	see Nantong
22	Xinghua	649,849	575,288	see Taizhou
23	Taixing	619,033	553,079	see Taizhou
24	Hai'an	601,165	(Note: Hai'an County is currently known as Hai'an CLC after 2010 census.)	see Nantong
25	Taicang	586,830	435,225	see Suzhou
26	Qidong	580,157	479,243	see Nantong
27	Xinyi	549,911	402,169	see Xuzhou
28	Dongtai	524,562	489,815	see Yancheng
29	Liyang	495,507	368,409	see Changzhou
30	Jingjiang	453,970	388,119	see Taizhou
31	Gaoyou	422,816	341,069	see Yangzhou
32	Jurong	412,996	299,033	see Zhenjiang
33	Yizheng	356,995	271,969	see Yangzhou
34	Yangzhong	221,434	179,771	see Zhenjiang
—	Haimen	661,983	453,781	see Nantong
—	Wujiang	see Suzhou	781,771	see Suzhou
—	Jiangdu	see Yangzhou	506,706	see Yangzhou
—	Jiangyan	see Taizhou	376,724	see Taizhou
—	Dafeng	see Yancheng	347,389	see Yancheng
—	Jintan	see Changzhou	275,185	see Changzhou

== Politics ==
The politics of Jiangsu is structured in a one party (Communist) government system like all other governing institutions in mainland China.

The Governor of Jiangsu is the highest-ranking official in the People's Government of Jiangsu. However, in the province's dual party-government governing system, the Governor has less power than the Jiangsu Chinese Communist Party Provincial Committee Secretary, colloquially termed the "Jiangsu CCP Party Chief".

=== Courts ===
In July 2021, the Jiangsu Intermediate Court established a labor tribunal to handle labor disputes arising from the platform economy.

== Economy ==
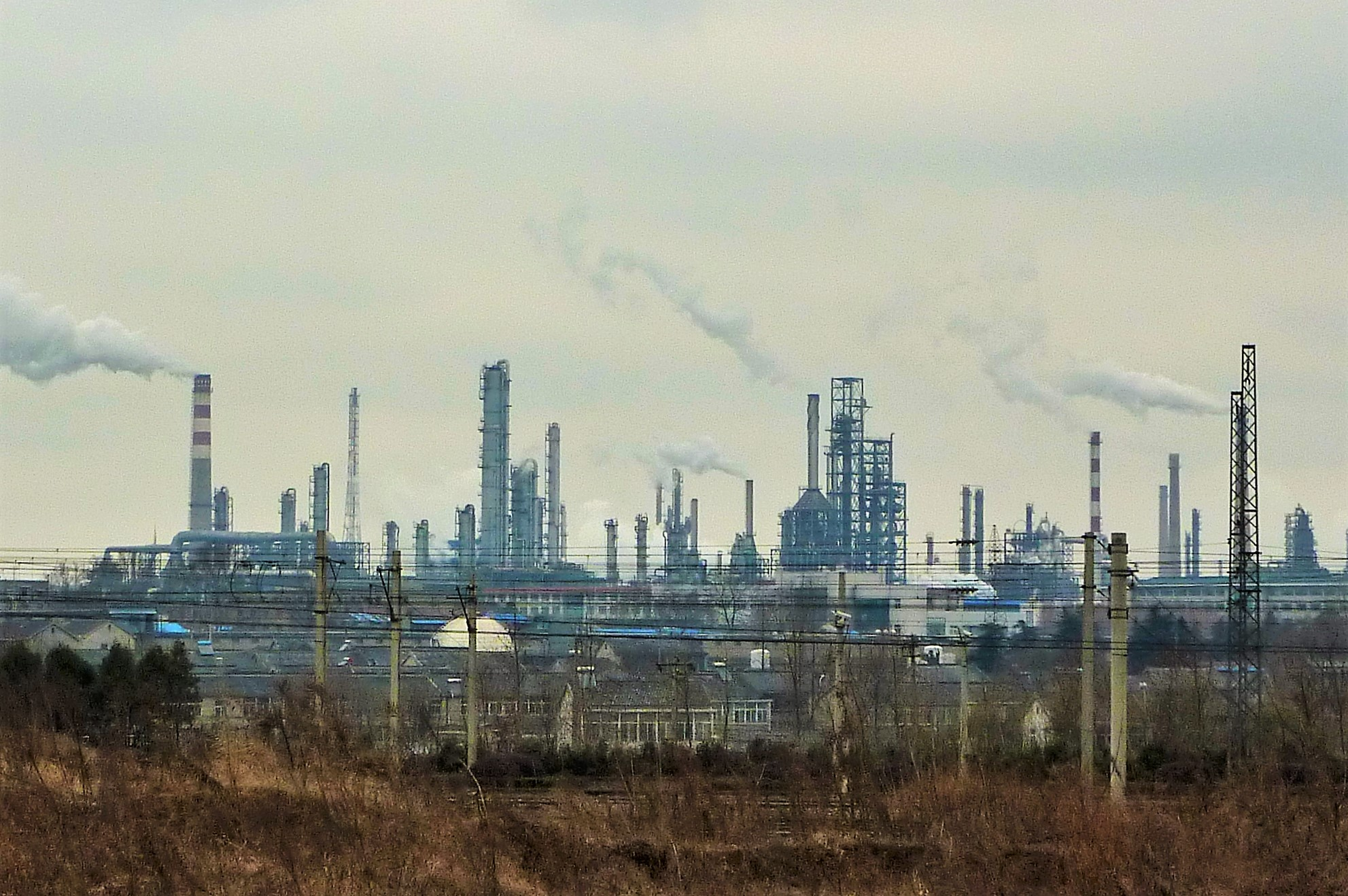
An industrial landscape in Ganjiaxiang, Qixia District, Nanjing

As of 2022, Jiangsu had a gross domestic product (GDP) of CNY¥12.29 trillion (US$1.83 trillion), the second-highest in China after Guangdong. Its GDP is greater than those of Australia and South Korea, which are the world's 12th- and 13th-largest economies respectively. In 2022, Jiangsu's GDP adjusted by purchasing power parity was $3.04 trillion, making it the 3rd-largest of any country subdivision globally, behind California and Guangdong. Jiangsu's economy in PPP also was just behind that of Italy with a GDP PPP of $ $3.05 trillion, the 12th largest in the world.

Jiangsu is very wealthy among the provinces of China. Its 2022 nominal GDP per capita reached ¥144,390 (US$21,467), becoming the first province in China to reach the $20,000 mark. Cities like Nanjing, Suzhou, and Wuxi have GDPs per capita around twice the provincial average, making south Jiangsu one of the most prosperous regions in China.

The province has an extensive irrigation system supporting its agriculture, which is based primarily on rice and wheat, followed by maize and sorghum. Main cash crops include cotton, soybeans, peanuts, rapeseed, sesame, ambary hemp, and tea. Other products include peppermint, spearmint, bamboo, medicinal herbs, apples, pears, peaches, loquats, ginkgo. Silkworms form an important part of Jiangsu's agriculture, with the Lake Tai region to the south a major base of silk production in China. Jiangsu is an important producer of freshwater fish and other aquatic products.

Jiangsu has coal, petroleum, and natural gas deposits, but its most significant mineral products are non-metal minerals such as halite (rock salt), sulfur, phosphorus, and marble. The city of Xuzhou is a coal hub of China. The salt mines of Huaiyin have more than 0.4 trillion tonnes of deposits, one of the greatest collections of deposits in China.

Jiangsu is historically oriented toward light industries such as textiles and food industry. Since 1949, Jiangsu has developed heavy industries such as chemical industry and construction materials. Jiangsu's important industries include machinery, electronic, chemicals, and automobile. The government has worked hard to promote the solar industry and hoped by 2012 the solar industry would be worth 100 billion RMB. Jiangsu's economy growth has directly benefited from the reform Chinese's policies, and its growth trajectory reflects that of many other coastal provinces, such as Zhejiang and Shandong. The reform and opening up of Deng Xiaoping have greatly benefited southern cities, especially Suzhou and Wuxi, which outstrip the provincial capital, Nanjing, in total output. In the eastern outskirts of Suzhou, Singapore has built the Suzhou Industrial Park, a flagship of Sino-Singaporean cooperation and the only industrial park in China that is in its entirety the investment of a single foreign country.

Jiangsu contains over 100 different economic and technological development zones devoted to different types of investments.

== Demographics ==
Historical population
Year	Pop.	±%
1912	32,283,000	—
1928	34,126,000	+5.7%
1936–37	36,469,000	+6.9%
1947	36,080,000	−1.1%
1954	41,252,192	+14.3%
1964	44,504,608	+7.9%
1982	60,521,114	+36.0%
1990	67,056,519	+10.8%
2000	73,043,577	+8.9%
2010	78,659,903	+7.7%
Shanghai was part of Jiangsu Province until 1927. Nanjing part of Jiangsu Province until 1927; dissolved in 1952 and incorporated into Jiangsu Province.

The majority of Jiangsu residents are ethnic Han Chinese. Other minorities include the Hui and the Manchus. In 2021, 73.94 percent of the province lived in urban areas, while 26.06 lived in rural areas.

Demographic indicators in 2021

Population: 85.05 million (urban: 62.89 million; rural: 39.421 million)
Birth rate: 5.65 per 1000
Death rate: 6.77 per 1000
Sex ratio: 103.05 males per 100 females
Literacy rate: 96.94%

=== Religion ===
Religion in Jiangsu (Note: The data was collected by the Chinese General Social Survey (CGSS) of 2009 and by the Chinese Spiritual Life Survey (CSLS) of 2007, reported and assembled by Xiuhua Wang (2015) in order to confront the proportion of people identifying with two similar social structures: ① Christian churches, and ② the traditional Chinese religion of the lineage (i. e. people believing and worshipping ancestral deities often organized into lineage "churches" and ancestral shrines). Data for other religions with a significant presence in China (deity cults, Buddhism, Taoism, folk religious sects, Islam, et al.) was not reported by Wang.)
1. Chinese ancestral religion (16.7%)
2. Christianity (2.64%)
3. Other religions or not religious people (Note: This may include: Buddhists; Confucians; Deity worshippers; Taoists; Members of folk religious sects; Small minorities of Muslims; And people not bounded to, nor practicing any, institutional or diffuse religion.) (80.7%)

The predominant religions in Jiangsu are Chinese folk religions, Taoist traditions and Chinese Buddhism. According to surveys conducted in 2007 and 2009, 16.67% of the population believes and is involved in cults of ancestors, while 2.64% of the population identifies as Christian. The reports didn't give figures for other types of religion; 80.69% of the population may be either irreligious or involved in worship of nature deities, Buddhism, Confucianism, Taoism, folk religious sects, and small minorities of Muslims.

In 2010, there were 130,757 Muslims in Jiangsu.

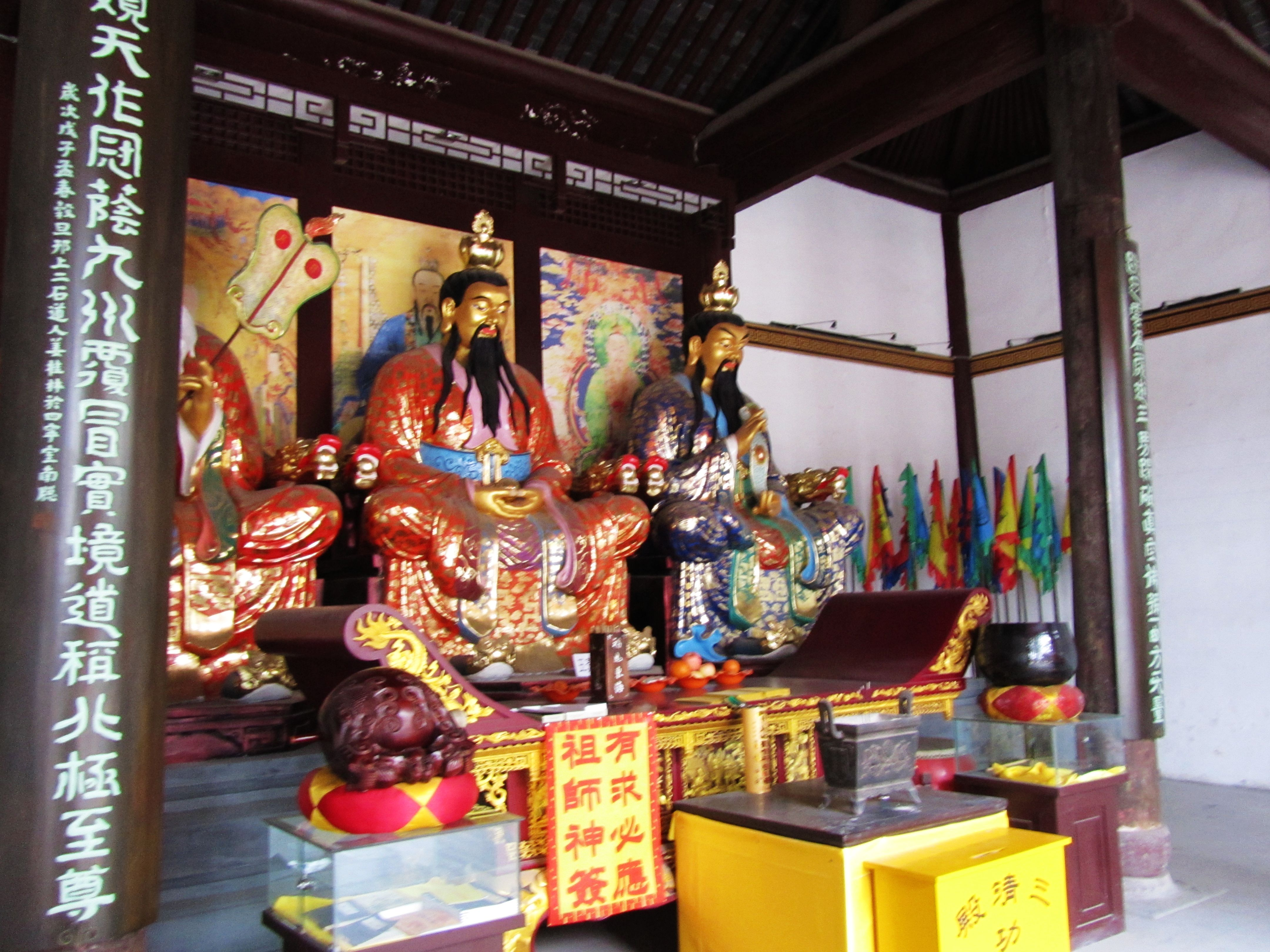
Altar of the Three Pure Ones at the Temple of Zhenwu in Yangzhou

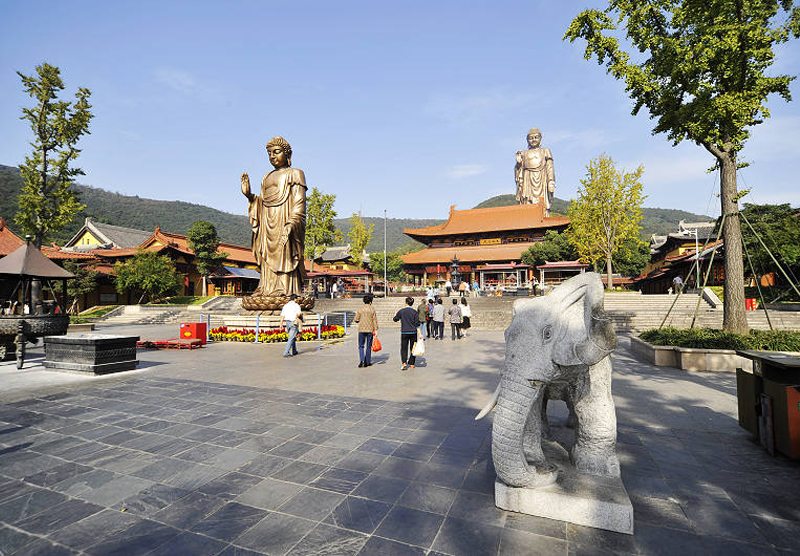
Xiangfu Buddhist Temple in Wuxi

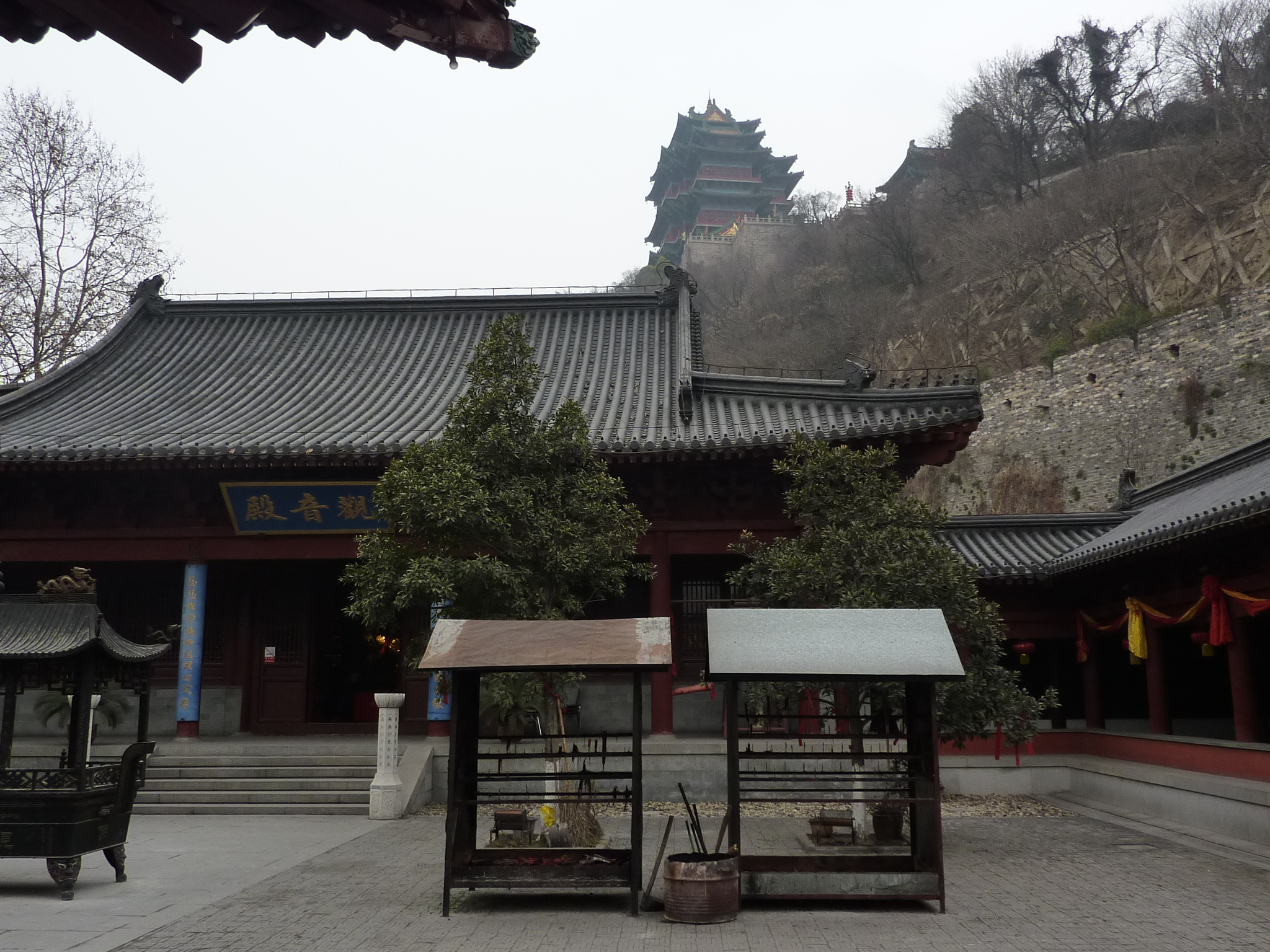
Main courtyard of the Temple of Tianfei in Nanjing

== Transportation ==
=== Air ===
Nanjing Lukou International Airport (IATA: NKG) serves as the major airport in the province, with flights to Tokyo, Osaka, Hong Kong, Seoul-Incheon, Frankfurt, Bangkok, Milan, Vancouver and Los Angeles. Other passenger airports include Sunan Shuofang International Airport, Changzhou Benniu Airport, Yangzhou Taizhou International Airport, and Nantong Xingdong Airport. Air traffic in the populated Suzhou area is often diverted to Shanghai Hongqiao International Airport, to which Suzhou is conveniently connected to via bus services and by expressway.

Xuzhou Guanyin International Airport, Yancheng Nanyang International Airport, and Lianyungang Baitabu Airport serve as hubs in northern Jiangsu.

=== Rail ===
The southern part of the province, namely the Shanghai-Nanjing corridor, has very high-frequency rail services. Jiangsu is on the Jinghu railway from Beijing to Shanghai, as well as the high speed line between the two cities: Shanghai–Nanjing intercity railway and Beijing-Shanghai high-speed railway, completed in 2010 and 2011, respectively. Since the completion of the Beijing-Shanghai high-speed line, travel time between Beijing and Nanjing has been reduced to approximately four hours (from eleven hours previously); travel time between Nanjing and Shanghai on the fastest high-speed trains takes just over an hour.

As of 2022, all major cities in Jiangsu have been connected by high-speed lines, including: Shanghai-Nanjing intercity railway since 2010, Beijing-Shanghai high-speed railway since 2011, Nanjing–Hangzhou high-speed railway since 2013, Nanjing–Anqing intercity railway since 2015, Lianyungang–Zhenjiang high-speed railway since 2020, Xuzhou–Yancheng high-speed railway since 2019, Yancheng–Nantong high-speed railway since 2020, Shanghai–Suzhou–Nantong railway since 2020, and Lianyungang–Xuzhou high-speed railway since 2021.

=== Road ===
Jiangsu's road network is one of the most developed in the country. The Beijing–Shanghai Expressway (G2) enters the province from the north and passes through Huai'an, Yangzhou, Taizhou, and Wuxi on the way to Shanghai; traveling from Shanghai westbound, the G2 forks at Wuxi and continues onto Nanjing separately as G42, the Shanghai–Nanjing Expressway, which serves the widely traveled southern corridor of the province. The Ningchang Expressway links Nanjing with Changzhou. The Suzhou area is extensively networked with expressways, going in all directions. The Yanhai Expressway links the coastal regions of the province, passing through Nantong, Yancheng, and Lianyungang.

Historically, the province was divided by the Yangtze River into northern and southern regions. The first bridge across the river in Jiangsu, the Nanjing Yangtze River Bridge, was completed in 1968 during the Cultural Revolution. The second bridge crossing, Jiangyin Bridge, opened 30 years later at Jiangyin. As of October 2014, there were 11 cross-Yangtze bridges in the province, including the five in Nanjing, which also has two cross-river tunnels. The Jiangyin Bridge (1,385 m (4,544 ft)), Runyang Bridge (opened in 2005, connecting Yangzhou and Zhenjiang, 1,490 m (4,890 ft)), and Fourth Nanjing Bridge (opened in 2012; 1,418 m (4,652 ft)) all rank among the ten longest suspension bridges in the world. The Sutong Bridge, opened in 2008, connecting Nantong and Changshu, has one of the longest cable-stayed bridge spans in the world, at 1,088 m (3,570 ft).

=== Metro (subway) ===
As of December 2022, Jiangsu has six cities that have operational subway systems, together with an extra city (Huai'an) currently under construction. These six cities are Nanjing, Suzhou, Wuxi, Changzhou, Xuzhou and Nantong.

The Nanjing Metro was opened in September 2005. It was the sixth city in mainland China that opened up a metro system. As of December 2019 the city currently has 11 metro lines (Line 1, Line 2, Line 3, Line 4, Line 10, Line S1, Line S3, Line S6, Line S7, Line S8 and Line S9), with several extra ones (i.e. Line 5) under construction.

The Suzhou Metro was opened in April 2012. As of May 2025, it currently has nine operational lines: Line 1, Line 2, Line 3, Line 4, Line 5, Line 6, Line 7, Line 8, and Line 11, one under construction (Line 10), and at least 2 under planning (Line 9 and Line S4). Planned lines are expected to be operational by 2035.

The Wuxi Metro was opened in July 2014. The system is currently composed of four operational lines by 2022: Line 1, Line 2, Line 3 and Line 4. It also has two other lines under construction: Line S1 and an extension of Line 4.

The Changzhou Metro was opened in September 2019. The system currently only has two lines operational, Line 1 and Line 2.

The Xuzhou Metro was opened in September 2019, a few days after the Changzhou Metro started operations. The system currently only has three lines operational, Line 1, Line 2 and Line 3.

The Nantong Metro was opened in November 2022. It has one operating line: Line 1 and another line under construction: Line 2.

The Huai'an Metro, also known as the Huai'an Rail System, began construction in November 2018. There are seven lines planned: Line 1, Line 2, Line 3, Line 4, Line 5, Line S1, and Line S2. It is expected to start operations before 2025.

== Culture ==
The four mass migrations in the 4th, 8th, 12th and 14th centuries had been influential in shaping the regional culture of Jiangsu. According to dialects and the other factors, the province can be roughly segmented four major cultural subdivisions: Wu (吴), Jinling (金陵), Huaiyang (淮扬) and Xuhuai (徐淮), from southeast to northwest. The belts of transition blurred the boundaries.

Group	Wuyue	Lower Yangtze		Central Plains
Designation	Wu	Jinling	Huaiyang	Xuhuai
Major dialect	Wu Chinese	Lower Yangtze Mandarin	Lower Yangtze Mandarin	Central Plains Mandarin
Core	Suzhou	Nanjing	Yangzhou	Xuzhou

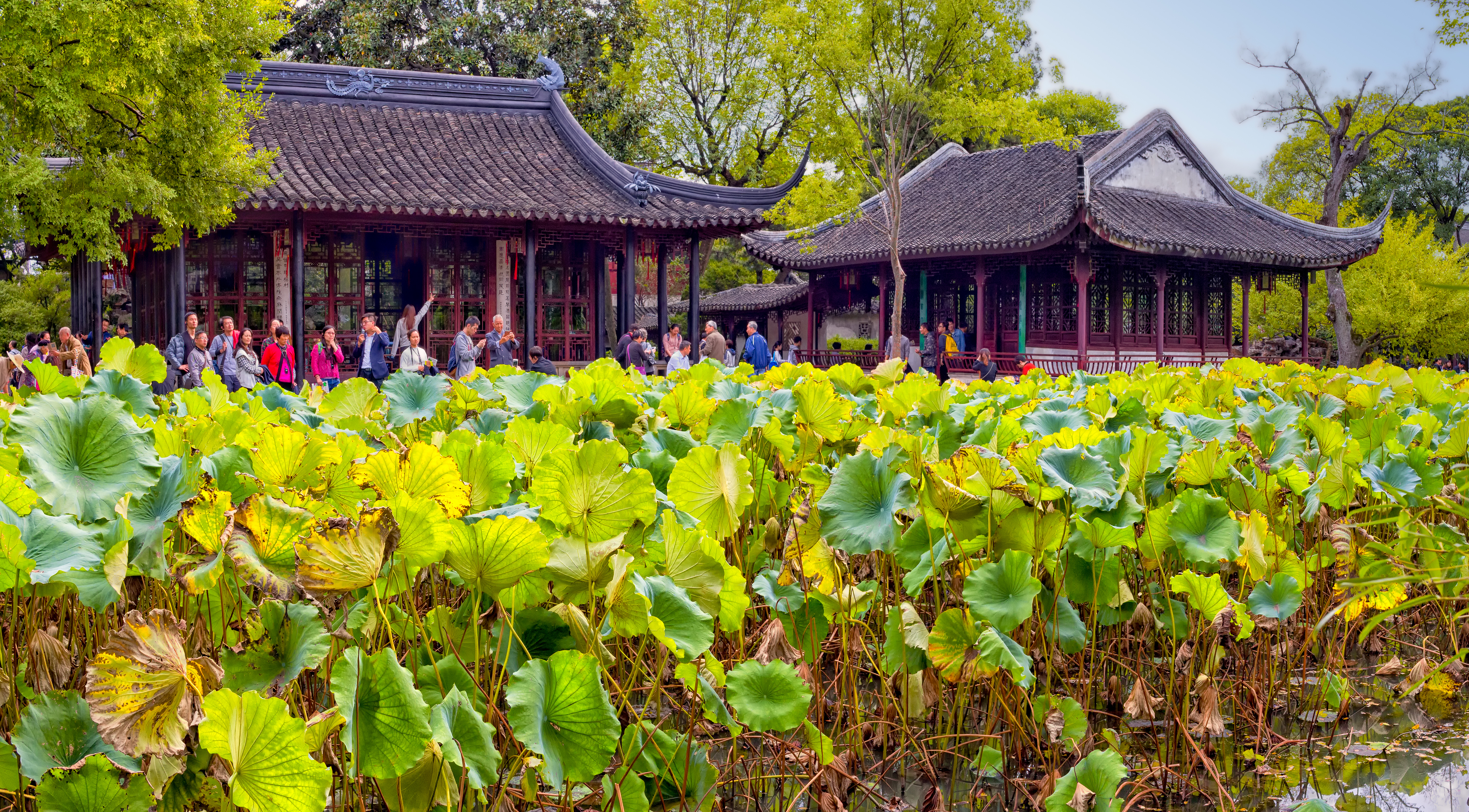
The Humble Administrator's Garden, one of the classical gardens of Suzhou

Jiangsu is rich in cultural traditions. Kunqu, originating in Kunshan, is one of the most renowned and prestigious forms of Chinese opera. Pingtan, a form of storytelling accompanied by music, is also popular: it can be subdivided into types by origin: Suzhou Pingtan (of Suzhou), Yangzhou Pingtan (of Yangzhou), and Nanjing Pingtan (of Nanjing). Wuxi opera, a form of traditional Chinese opera, is popular in Wuxi, while Huaiju is popular further north, around Yancheng. Jiangsu cuisine is one of the eight great traditions of the cuisine of China.

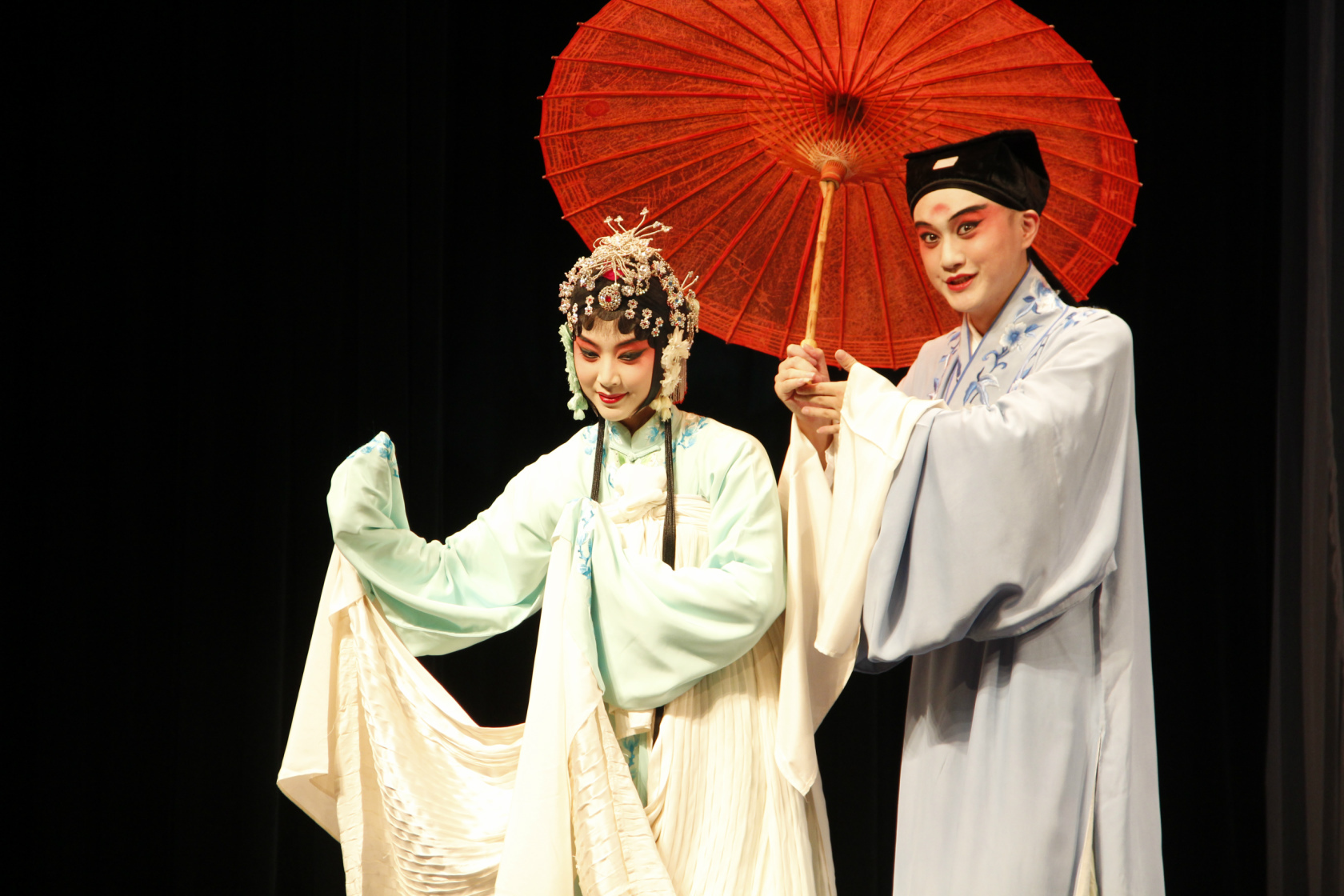
Kunqu

Suzhou is also well known for its silk, Chinese embroidery, jasmine tea, stone bridges, pagodas, and classical gardens. Nearby Yixing is noted for its teaware while Yangzhou is known for its lacquerware and jadeware. Nanjing's yunjin is a noted type of woven silk.

Since ancient times, south Jiangsu has been famed for its prosperity and opulence, and simply inserting south Jiangsu place names (Suzhou, Yangzhou, etc.) into poetry gave an effect of dreaminess, as was indeed done by many famous poets. In particular, the fame of Suzhou (as well as Hangzhou in neighbouring Zhejiang) has led to the popular saying: 上有天堂，下有蘇杭 ("above there is heaven; below there are Suzhou and Hangzhou"), a saying that continues to be a source of pride for the people of these two still prosperous cities. Similarly, the prosperity of Yangzhou has led poets to dream of: 腰纏十萬貫，騎鶴下揚州 ("with a hundred thousand strings of coins wrapped around its waist, a crane landed in Yangzhou").

== Education and research ==
=== Higher education ===
As of 2022, Jiangsu hosts 168 institutions of higher education, ranking first of all Chinese provinces. There are two Project 985, 11 Project 211, and 16 Double First-Class Construction universities in the province. A combination of 93 members of Chinese Academy of Sciences and Chinese Academy of Engineering work in Jiangsu.

As of 2025, six major cities in Jiangsu are ranked among the world's top 200 cities for scientific research output, according to the Nature Index. These cities include Nanjing (5th), Suzhou (33rd), Zhenjiang (98th), Yangzhou (118th), Wuxi (161st), and Changzhou (173rd). Notably, Jiangsu is the only province in China with at least five major cities achieving this distinction.

==== Double First Class Universities in Jiangsu ====
Jiangsu (16)	Nanjing (13)	China Pharmaceutical University; Hohai University; Nanjing Aeronautics and Astronautics University; Nanjing Agricultural University; Nanjing Forestry University; Nanjing Medical University; Nanjing Normal University; Nanjing University; Nanjing University of Chinese Medicine; Nanjing University of Information Science and Technology; Nanjing University of Posts and Telecommunications; Nanjing University of Science and Technology; Southeast University
Jiangsu (16)	Wuxi	Jiangnan University
Jiangsu (16)	Suzhou	Soochow University
Jiangsu (16)	Xuzhou	China University of Mining and Technology

Other Major Research Universities in Jiangsu

- Jiangsu University
- Jiangsu Normal University
- Yangzhou University
- Nanjing Tech University
- Jiangsu University of Science and Technology
- Changzhou University
- Nantong University
- Suzhou University of Science and Technology
- Nanjing Institute of Technology
- Huaiyin Institute of Technology

=== Additional schools ===
- Nanjing Jinling High School
- Huangqiao High School
- Xishan Senior High School
- Qianhuang Senior High School
- School of Foreign Languages and Cultures of NNU
- Xuyi High School
- Baochang High School

== Tourism ==
Nanjing was the capital of several Chinese dynasties and contains a variety of historic sites, such as the Purple Mountain, Purple Mountain Observatory, the Sun Yat-sen Mausoleum, Ming dynasty city wall and gates, Ming Xiaoling Mausoleum (the mausoleum of the first Ming Emperor, Hongwu Emperor), Xuanwu Lake, Jiming Temple, the Nanjing Massacre Memorial, Nanjing Confucius Temple, Nanjing Yangtze River Bridge, and the Nanjing Zoo, along with its circus. Suzhou is renowned for its classical gardens (designated as a UNESCO World Heritage Site), as well as the Hanshan Temple, and Huqiu Tower. Nearby is the water-town of Zhouzhuang, an international tourist destination with Venice-like waterways, bridges and dwellings, which have been preserved over centuries. Yangzhou is known for Slender West Lake. Wuxi is known for being the home of the world's tallest Buddha statue. In the north, Xuzhou is designated as one of China's "eminent historical cities". The official travel and tourism website for Jiangsu was set up in 2008.

- Lion Garden in Suzhou
- Grand Buddha at Ling Shan, Wuxi
- Chaotian Palace
- Qixia Temple
- Tianning Temple Pagoda
- Tombs of Southern Tang Emperor
- Yangzhong Puffer Fish

== Sports ==
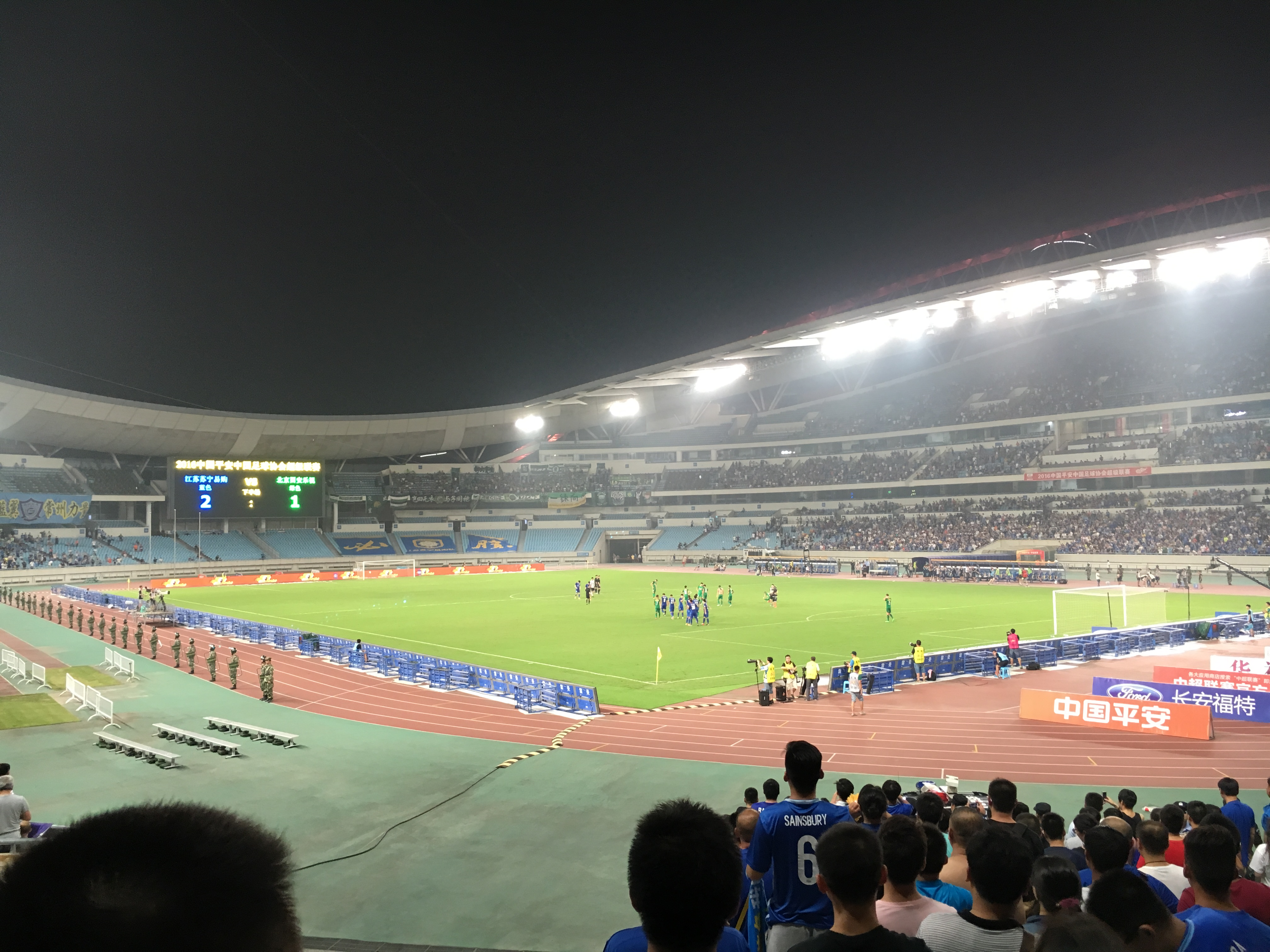
Nanjing Olympic Sports Center

Professional sports teams in Jiangsu include:

- China League One
  - Nanjing City F.C.
  - Nantong Zhiyun F.C.
  - Suzhou Dongwu F.C.
- China League Two
  - Wuxi Wugo F.C.
- Chinese Basketball Association
  - Jiangsu Dragons
  - Nanjing Monkey King
- Chinese Volleyball League
  - Jiangsu Zenith Steel
- China Baseball League
  - Jiangsu Pegasus

== International relations ==
=== Twin Provinces ===
Country	State/Province	Time
Australia	Victoria	1979/11/18
Japan	Aichi	1980/7/28
North Korea	Kangwon	1984/11/8
Canada	Ontario	1985/11/21
United States	New York	1989/4/21
United Kingdom	Essex	1992/7/16
Germany	North Rhine-Westphalia	1992/8/1
Italy	Tuscany	1992/9/18
Japan	Fukuoka	1992/11/4
Pakistan	Punjab	1993/12/28
Germany	Baden-Württemberg	1994/4/23
Netherlands	North Brabant	1994/9/9
South Korea	North Jeolla	1994/10/27
Brazil	Minas Gerais	1996/3/27
Italy	Veneto	1998/6/22
Sweden	Östergötland	1999/3/22
Russia	Moscow Oblast	1999/8/20
Belgium	Namur	2000/5/7
South Africa	Free state	2000/6/7
Poland	Lesser Poland	2000/11/16
Finland	Southern Finland	2001/5/11
Colombia	Atlántico	2001/6/4
Malaysia	Malacca	2002/9/18
France	Alsace	2007/05/24
Mexico	Baja California	2006/8/23
Switzerland	Lucerne	2011/4/26
United States	California	2011/7/18
Turkey	İzmir	2012/4/30
Spain	Basque	2012/4/27
Denmark	Capital Region	2015/1/30
Belarus	Mogilev	2015/5/10
Namibia	Khomas	2015/6/19
Malaysia	Kedah	2023/10/6

=== Twin towns and sister cities ===
- Nanjing with Aichi, Japan

== See also ==
- Aviation Martyrs' Cemetery
- Jiangsu-Hong Kong Personnel Training Cooperation Programme
- Major national historical and cultural sites in Jiangsu
