= School of Foreign Languages and Cultures of NNU =

School of Foreign Languages and Cultures of NNU Chinese: 南京师范大学外国语学院

Information
- Established: 1898; 127 years ago

School of Foreign Languages and Cultures of NNU (南京师范大学外国语学院) in Nanjing, China, was originally established in 1898.

The school teaches eight undergraduate languages: English, Spanish, Japanese, Russian, Italian, Korean, German and French, among which there is only English majored for four years and the rest are five years. Students can get their bachelor's degree, master's degree and Ph.D. from it.
