= Chahe, Sichuan =

Chahe 茶河镇
- Town
- Location in Sichuan
- Coordinates: 31°23′29″N 108°6′57″E
- Country: People's Republic of China
- Province: Sichuan
- Prefecture-level city: Dazhou
- County: Xuanhan County
- Time zone: UTC+8 (China Standard)

Chahe (Chinese: 茶河; pinyin: Cháhé) is a town in Xuanhan County, Dazhou, Sichuan. As of 2020, it administers Chayun Community (茶韵社区) and the following eleven villages:

- Chahe Village
- Wusheng Village (武胜村)
- Linggang Village (岭岗村)
- Shengshui Village (圣水村)
- Changping Village (长坪村)
- Liaoye Village (簝叶村)
- Guoshan Village (国山村)
- Longguan Village (龙观村)
- Banxian Village (板仙村)
- Zhongping Village (钟坪村)
- Jingping Village (净瓶村)
