= Hongze, Huai'an =

Hongze 洪泽区 Hungtze
- County
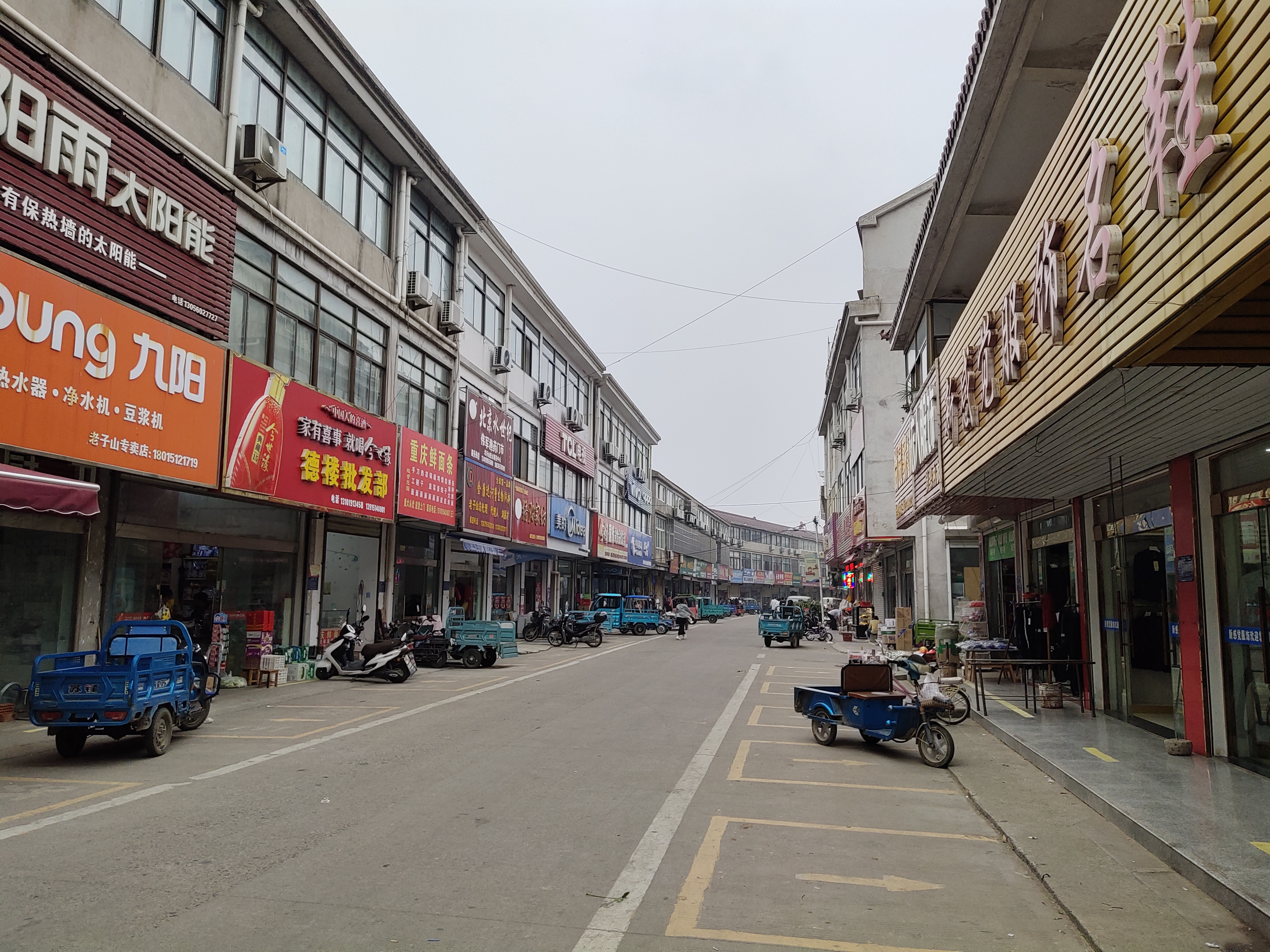
- Commercial area in Hongze District

- Location in Jiangsu
- Coordinates: 33°13′26″N 118°49′34″E
- Country: People's Republic of China
- Province: Jiangsu
- Prefecture-level city: Huai'an

Area
  - Total: 1,394 km^{2} (538 sq mi)

Population (2020 census)
  - Total: 285,097
  - Density: 204.5/km^{2} (529.7/sq mi)
- Time zone: UTC+8 (China Standard)
- Postal code: 223100

Hongze (simplified Chinese: 洪泽; traditional Chinese: 洪澤; pinyin: Hóngzé) is one of four districts (a former county) of the prefecture-level city of Huai'an, Jiangsu Province, China. Occupying the southeastern shores of Lake Hongze, it borders the prefecture-level cities of Suqian to the northwest and Yangzhou (briefly) to the east.

During the Second Sino-Japanese War, the New Fourth Army established Huaibao and Hongze counties around Lake Hongze, in 1940 and 1941 respectively. Both counties were dissolved in 1950. The new Hongze county, within a wider area around the lake, was founded to implement the guiding principle of "reshuffling administrative divisions by the lake" in 1956.

== Administrative divisions ==
At present, Hongze District has 11 towns.

11 towns

- Gaoliangjian (高良涧镇)
- Jiangba (蒋坝镇)
- Renhe (仁和镇)
- Chahe (岔河镇)
- Xishunhe (西顺河镇)
- Laozishan (老子山镇)
- Sanhe (三河镇)
- Dongshuanggou (东双沟镇)
- Wanji (万集镇)
- Huangji (黄集镇)
- Gonghe (共和镇)

== Climate ==
Climate data for Hongze, elevation 11 m (36 ft), (1991–2020 normals, extremes 1981–present)
Month	Jan	Feb	Mar	Apr	May	Jun	Jul	Aug	Sep	Oct	Nov	Dec	Year
Record high °C (°F)	21.0 (69.8)	26.8 (80.2)	32.9 (91.2)	32.5 (90.5)	35.1 (95.2)	36.3 (97.3)	38.0 (100.4)	37.6 (99.7)	36.7 (98.1)	31.2 (88.2)	27.2 (81.0)	21.0 (69.8)	38.0 (100.4)
Mean daily maximum °C (°F)	5.8 (42.4)	8.6 (47.5)	13.9 (57.0)	20.4 (68.7)	25.5 (77.9)	28.9 (84.0)	31.2 (88.2)	30.7 (87.3)	26.9 (80.4)	21.7 (71.1)	15.0 (59.0)	8.3 (46.9)	19.7 (67.5)
Daily mean °C (°F)	1.8 (35.2)	4.2 (39.6)	9.0 (48.2)	15.2 (59.4)	20.6 (69.1)	24.5 (76.1)	27.4 (81.3)	26.9 (80.4)	22.6 (72.7)	16.9 (62.4)	10.3 (50.5)	4.0 (39.2)	15.3 (59.5)
Mean daily minimum °C (°F)	−1.3 (29.7)	0.7 (33.3)	4.9 (40.8)	10.6 (51.1)	16.1 (61.0)	20.7 (69.3)	24.5 (76.1)	24.0 (75.2)	19.4 (66.9)	13.1 (55.6)	6.6 (43.9)	0.7 (33.3)	11.7 (53.0)
Record low °C (°F)	−10.3 (13.5)	−8.4 (16.9)	−4.2 (24.4)	−1.4 (29.5)	7.8 (46.0)	12.5 (54.5)	18.7 (65.7)	15.3 (59.5)	12.0 (53.6)	2.4 (36.3)	−5.2 (22.6)	−10.2 (13.6)	−10.3 (13.5)
Average precipitation mm (inches)	30.4 (1.20)	34.4 (1.35)	52.7 (2.07)	52.0 (2.05)	75.4 (2.97)	134.8 (5.31)	231.4 (9.11)	172.4 (6.79)	75.6 (2.98)	45.0 (1.77)	44.8 (1.76)	25.9 (1.02)	974.8 (38.38)
Average precipitation days (≥ 0.1 mm)	6.6	7.4	8.1	7.8	8.8	9.5	13.0	12.8	8.0	6.7	7.0	5.8	101.5
Average snowy days	3.5	2.7	1	0	0	0	0	0	0	0	0.6	1.2	9
Average relative humidity (%)	73	72	69	70	72	77	84	85	81	77	75	72	76
Mean monthly sunshine hours	148.5	142.1	174.2	194.6	204.6	171.5	186.2	198.8	184.1	184.8	156.5	155.8	2,101.7
Percentage possible sunshine	47	45	47	50	47	40	43	48	50	53	50	51	48
Source: China Meteorological Administration

== See also ==
- Lü Peijian
