= Line S4 (Suzhou Metro) =

Proposed railway line in Suzhou, Jiangsu, China

- S4

Overview
- Status: Planned
- Owner: Suzhou Rail Transit Co., Ltd
- Stations: Unknown

Service
- Type: Rapid transit
- System: Suzhou Metro
- Operator(s): Suzhou Rail Transit Co., Ltd

Technical
- Line length: Unknown
- Track gauge: 1,435 mm (4 ft 8 1/2 in)

Line S4 of Suzhou Metro (Chinese: 苏州轨道交通S4线) will be a north–south rapid transit express line. The line will run through Zhangjiagang, Changshu, Xiangcheng, Gusu, Wuzhong, and Wujiang. The line will serve as a rapid connection between the main city of Suzhou and the county-level city of Changshu, and to a lesser extent, Zhangjiagang.

There is no planned construction date, but construction is expected to start before 2035.
